= List of Egyptair destinations =

This is a list of destinations served by Egyptair as of March 2026. The list includes terminated destinations, some of which were operated as Misr Airwork, Misr Airlines, Misr Air and United Arab Airlines (UAA). For freighter destinations, see Egyptair Cargo.

== List ==
Country	City	Airport	Notes	Refs
Algeria	Algiers	Houari Boumediene Airport		
Argentina	Buenos Aires	Ministro Pistarini International Airport	Terminated	
Armenia	Yerevan	Zvartnots International Airport	Terminated	
Australia	Sydney	Sydney Airport	Resumes in 2027 via Singapore	
Austria	Vienna	Vienna International Airport		
Bahrain	Manama	Bahrain International Airport		
Bangladesh	Dhaka	Hazrat Shahjalal International Airport		
Belgium	Brussels	Brussels Airport		
Brazil	São Paulo	São Paulo/Guarulhos International Airport	Terminated	
Cameroon	Douala	Douala International Airport		
Canada	Montreal	Montréal–Trudeau International Airport	Terminated	
Canada	Toronto	Toronto Pearson International Airport		
Canada	Vancouver	Vancouver International Airport	Terminated	
Chad	N'Djamena	N'Djamena International Airport		
China	Beijing	Beijing Capital International Airport		
China	Guangzhou	Guangzhou Baiyun International Airport		
China	Hangzhou	Hangzhou Xiaoshan International Airport		
China	Hong Kong	Hong Kong International Airport	Terminated	
China	Shanghai	Shanghai Pudong International Airport		
Comoros	Moroni	Prince Said Ibrahim International Airport	Terminated	
Côte d'Ivoire	Abidjan	Félix-Houphouët-Boigny International Airport		
Cyprus	Larnaca	Larnaca International Airport		
Cyprus	Nicosia	Nicosia International Airport	Terminated	
Czech Republic	Prague	Václav Havel Airport Prague		
Democratic Republic of the Congo	Kinshasa	N'djili Airport		
Denmark	Copenhagen	Copenhagen Airport		
Djibouti	Djibouti City	Djibouti–Ambouli International Airport		
Egypt	Abu Simbel	Abu Simbel Airport		
Egypt	Alexandria	Alexandria International Airport	Focus city	
Egypt	Assiut	Assiut Airport		
Egypt	Aswan	Aswan International Airport		
Egypt	Cairo	Cairo International Airport	Hub	
Egypt	El Alamein	El Alamein International Airport	Terminated	
Egypt	El Kharga	El Kharga Airport		
Egypt	Hurghada	Hurghada International Airport		
Egypt	Luxor	Luxor International Airport		
Egypt	Marsa Alam	Marsa Alam International Airport		
Egypt	Marsa Matruh	Marsa Matruh International Airport	Terminated	
Egypt	Minya	El Minya Airport	Terminated	
Egypt	Port Said	Port Said Airport	Terminated	
Egypt	Sharm El Sheikh	Sharm El Sheikh International Airport	Focus city	
Egypt	Sharq El Owainat	Sharq El Owainat Airport	Terminated	
Egypt	Sohag	Sohag International Airport		
Eritrea	Asmara	Asmara International Airport		
Ethiopia	Addis Ababa	Addis Ababa Bole International Airport		
Finland	Helsinki	Helsinki Airport	Terminated	
France	Nice	Nice Côte d'Azur Airport	Terminated	
France	Paris	Charles de Gaulle Airport		
Germany	Berlin	Berlin Brandenburg Airport		
Germany	Berlin	Berlin Schönefeld Airport	Airport closed	
Germany	Düsseldorf	Düsseldorf Airport		
Germany	Frankfurt	Frankfurt Airport		
Germany	Hamburg	Hamburg Airport	Terminated	
Germany	Munich	Munich Airport		
Ghana	Accra	Accra International Airport		
Greece	Athens	Athens International Airport		
Greece	Mykonos	Mykonos Airport	Terminated	
Greece	Thessaloniki	Thessaloniki Airport	Terminated	
Hungary	Budapest	Budapest Ferenc Liszt International Airport		
India	Delhi	Indira Gandhi International Airport		
India	Mumbai	Chhatrapati Shivaji Maharaj International Airport		
Indonesia	Jakarta	Soekarno–Hatta International Airport		
Iraq	Baghdad	Baghdad International Airport		
Iraq	Erbil	Erbil International Airport		
Ireland	Dublin	Dublin Airport		
Israel	Haifa	Haifa Airport	Terminated	
Israel	Tel Aviv	Ben Gurion Airport	Suspended	
Italy	Milan	Milan Malpensa Airport		
Italy	Rome	Leonardo da Vinci–Fiumicino Airport		
Italy	Venice	Venice Marco Polo Airport		
Japan	Osaka	Kansai International Airport	Seasonal charter	
Japan	Tokyo	Haneda Airport	Terminated	
Japan	Tokyo	Narita International Airport		
Jordan	Amman	Queen Alia International Airport		
Kazakhstan	Almaty	Almaty International Airport	Terminated	
Kenya	Nairobi	Jomo Kenyatta International Airport		
Kuwait	Kuwait City	Kuwait International Airport		
Lebanon	Beirut	Beirut–Rafic Hariri International Airport		
Libya	Benghazi	Benina International Airport		
Libya	Misrata	Misrata International Airport		
Libya	Tripoli	Mitiga International Airport		
Libya	Tripoli	Tripoli International Airport	Airport closed	
Malaysia	Kuala Lumpur	Kuala Lumpur International Airport	Terminated	
Mali	Bamako	Bamako–Sénou International Airport	Terminated	
Morocco	Casablanca	Mohammed V International Airport		
Netherlands	Amsterdam	Amsterdam Airport Schiphol		
New Zealand	Auckland	Auckland Airport	Terminated	
Nigeria	Abuja	Nnamdi Azikiwe International Airport		
Nigeria	Kano	Mallam Aminu Kano International Airport		
Nigeria	Lagos	Murtala Muhammed International Airport		
Oman	Muscat	Muscat International Airport		
Pakistan	Karachi	Jinnah International Airport	Terminated	
Palestine	East Jerusalem	Atarot Airport	Terminated	
Palestine	Gaza City	Yasser Arafat International Airport	Terminated	
Philippines	Manila	Ninoy Aquino International Airport	Terminated	
Portugal	Lisbon	Lisbon Airport		
Qatar	Doha	Hamad International Airport		
Russia	Moscow	Moscow Domodedovo Airport		
Rwanda	Kigali	Kigali International Airport		
Saudi Arabia	Abha	Abha Regional Airport		
Saudi Arabia	Dammam	King Fahd International Airport		
Saudi Arabia	Dhahran	Dhahran International Airport	Airport closed	
Saudi Arabia	Gassim	Prince Nayef bin Abdulaziz International Airport		
Saudi Arabia	Jeddah	King Abdulaziz International Airport		
Saudi Arabia	Medina	Prince Mohammad bin Abdulaziz International Airport		
Saudi Arabia	Riyadh	King Khalid International Airport		
Serbia	Belgrade	Belgrade Nikola Tesla Airport	Terminated	
Sierra Leone	Freetown	Lungi International Airport	Terminated	
Singapore	Singapore	Changi Airport	Resumes in 2027	
Somalia	Mogadishu	Aden Adde International Airport		
South Africa	Cape Town	Cape Town International Airport	Terminated	
South Africa	Durban	King Shaka International Airport	Terminated	
South Africa	Johannesburg	O. R. Tambo International Airport		
South Sudan	Juba	Juba International Airport		
Spain	Barcelona	Josep Tarradellas Barcelona–El Prat Airport		
Spain	Madrid	Madrid–Barajas Airport		
Sudan	Khartoum	Khartoum International Airport		
Sudan	Port Sudan	Port Sudan New International Airport		
Sweden	Stockholm	Stockholm Arlanda Airport	Resumes 18 December 2026	
Switzerland	Geneva	Geneva Airport		
Switzerland	Zurich	Zurich Airport		
Syria	Aleppo	Aleppo International Airport	Resumes 6 December 2026	
Syria	Damascus	Damascus International Airport	Resumes 4 December 2026	
Syria	Kamishly	Kamishly Airport	Terminated	
Syria	Latakia	Latakia International Airport	Terminated	
Tanzania	Dar es Salaam	Julius Nyerere International Airport		
Tanzania	Zanzibar	Abeid Amani Karume International Airport		
Thailand	Bangkok	Don Mueang International Airport	Terminated	
Thailand	Bangkok	Suvarnabhumi Airport	Terminated	
Tunisia	Tunis	Tunis–Carthage International Airport		
Turkey	Istanbul	Atatürk Airport	Airport closed	
Turkey	Istanbul	Istanbul Airport		
Uganda	Entebbe	Entebbe International Airport		
Ukraine	Kyiv	Boryspil International Airport	Terminated	
United Arab Emirates	Abu Dhabi	Zayed International Airport		
United Arab Emirates	Dubai	Dubai International Airport		
United Arab Emirates	Fujairah	Fujairah International Airport	Terminated	
United Arab Emirates	Sharjah	Sharjah International Airport		
United Kingdom	Birmingham	Birmingham Airport		
United Kingdom	London	Gatwick Airport	Terminated	
United Kingdom	London	Heathrow Airport		
United Kingdom	Manchester	Manchester Airport		
United States	Chicago	O'Hare International Airport		
United States	Detroit	Detroit Metropolitan Airport	Terminated	
United States	Houston	George Bush Intercontinental Airport	Terminated	
United States	Los Angeles	Los Angeles International Airport		
United States	Newark	Newark Liberty International Airport		
United States	New York City	John F. Kennedy International Airport		
United States	Washington, D.C.	Washington Dulles International Airport		
Vietnam	Hanoi	Noi Bai International Airport	Terminated	
Yemen	Aden	Aden International Airport	Terminated	
Yemen	Sanaa	Sanaa International Airport	Terminated	
Zambia	Lusaka	Kenneth Kaunda International Airport	Terminated	
Zimbabwe	Harare	Harare International Airport	Terminated	

== See also ==
- Air Sinai
- Egyptair Cargo
