= List of airports in Egypt =

This is a list of airports in Egypt, grouped by type and sorted by location. It is a list of public active aerodromes (airports and airfields) in Egypt. The ICAO codes for airports in Egypt begin with the two letters "HE". Egyptian airports are managed by the Ministry of Civil Aviation.

== Airports ==
Airport name	IATA	City served/location	ICAO
		Civil airports	
Sphinx International Airport	SPX	Giza	HESX
6th October City Airport		6th of October	HEOC
Abu Rudeis Airport	AUE	Abou Redis	
Abu Simbel Airport	ABS	Abu Simbel	HEBL
Alexandria International Airport	ALY	Alexandria	HEAX
Assiut Airport	ATZ	Assiut	HEAT
Aswan International Airport	ASW	Aswan	HESN
Bardawil International Airport	RDL	El Hassana	
Cairo International Airport	CAI	Cairo	HECA
Capital International Airport	CCE	New Administrative Capital	HECP
Dakhla Oasis Airport	DAK	Dakhla Oasis	HEDK
El Arish International Airport	AAC	El Arish	HEAR
El Alamein International Airport	DBB	El Dabaa	HEAL
El Gouna Airport		El Gouna	HEGO
El Gora Airport	EGH	El Gora	HEGR
El Kharga Airport	UVL	El Kharga	HEKG
El Tor Airport	ELT	El Tor	HETR
Hurghada International Airport	HRG	Hurghada	HEGN
Luxor International Airport	LXR	Luxor	HELX
Marsa Alam International Airport	RMF	Marsa Alam	HEMA
Marsa Matruh International Airport	MUH	Marsa Matrouh	HEMM
Port Said Airport	PSD	Port Said	HEPS
Ras Shokeir New Airport		Ras Shokeir	
Sharq El Owainat Airport	GSQ	Sharq El Owainat	HEOW
Sharm El Sheikh International Airport	SSH	Sharm El Sheikh	HESH
Sohag International Airport	HMB	Sohag	HEMK
St. Catherine International Airport	SKV	St. Catherine	HESC
Taba International Airport	TCP	Taba	HETB
		Military airports	
Cairo West Air Base	CWE	Cairo	HECW
Almaza Air Force Base		Cairo	HEAZ
Wadi al Jandali Air Base		Cairo	HE13
Helwan Airfield		Helwan	HE15
Minya Air Force Base	EMY	Minya	

== See also ==
- Transport in Egypt
- List of the busiest airports in the Middle East
- List of airports by ICAO code: H#HE - Egypt
- Wikipedia: WikiProject Aviation/Airline destination lists: Africa#Egypt
- List of North African airfields during World War II

== Sources ==
- "ICAO Location Indicators by State" (PDF). International Civil Aviation Organization. 2006-01-12. Archived from the original (PDF) on 2007-09-26.
- "UN Location Codes: Egypt] includes IATA codes". UN/LOCODE 2006-2. UNECE. 2007-04-30.
