= Red Sea Airlines (charter airline) =

Egyptian private airline

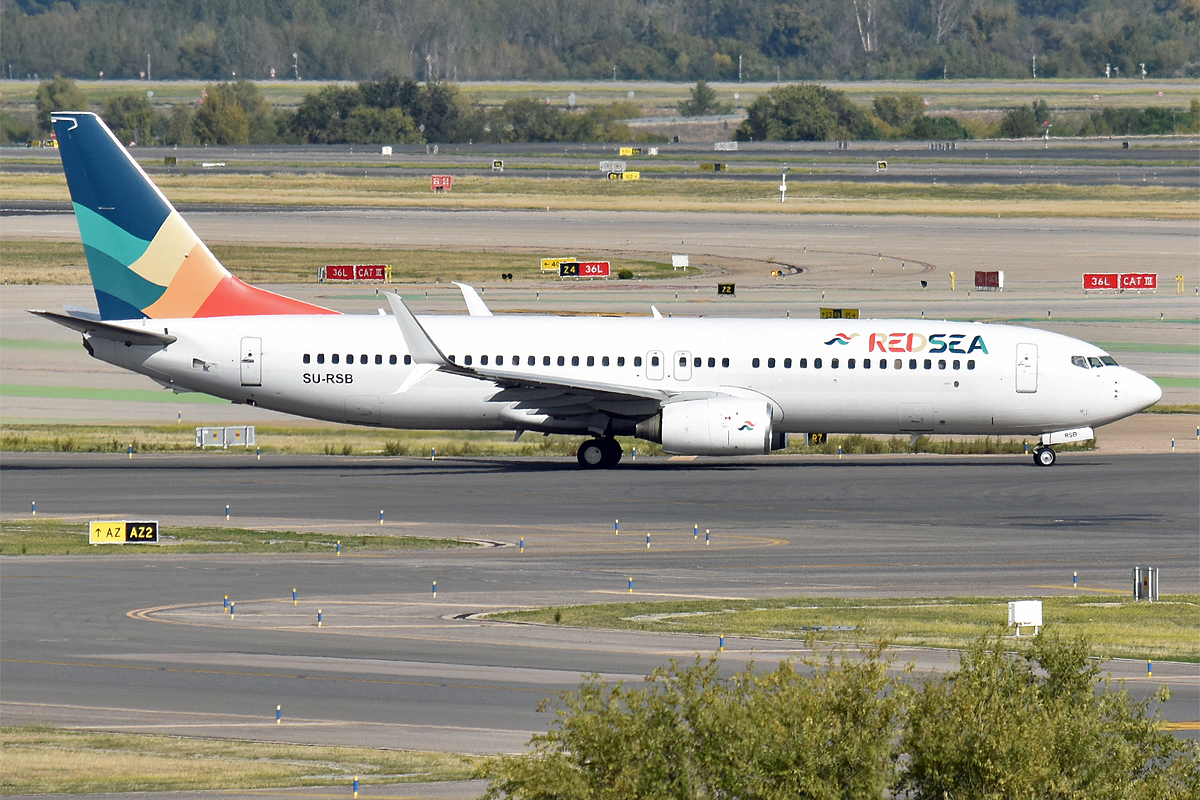
- Red Sea Airlines Boeing 737-800
IATA	ICAO	Call sign
4S	RSX	Red Sea
- Founded: 2021
- Fleet size: 4
- Headquarters: Cairo, Egypt
- Key people: Capt. Ahmed Shanan (CEO)
- Website: redseaairlines.com

Red Sea Airlines is an Egyptian private airline headquartered in Cairo, Egypt. Red Sea Airlines was established in Egypt in 2021. The airline operates scheduled and charter flights from Egypt. As of 17 June 2026, the airline's chief executive officer is Captain Ahmed Shanan, former chairman and CEO of Air Cairo.

== Destinations ==
The Red Sea Airlines route network consists of the following destinations:

Country	City	Airport	Notes	Refs
Armenia	Yerevan	Zvartnots International Airport	Terminated	
Denmark	Copenhagen	Copenhagen Airport	Terminated	
Egypt	Cairo	Cairo International Airport	Terminated	
Egypt	El Alamein	El Alamein International Airport	Begins 7 September 2026	
Egypt	Hurghada	Hurghada International Airport	Seasonal charter	
Egypt	Sharm El Sheikh	Sharm El Sheikh International Airport	Seasonal charter	
France	Paris	Charles de Gaulle Airport	Terminated	
Germany	Erfurt/Weimar	Erfurt–Weimar Airport	Seasonal charter	
Italy	Verona	Verona Villafranca Airport	Terminated	
Italy	Naples	Naples International Airport	Terminated	
Kazakhstan	Astana	Nursultan Nazarbayev International Airport	Seasonal charter	
Kazakhstan	Almaty	Almaty International Airport	Seasonal charter	
Kyrgyzstan	Bishkek	Manas International Airport	Seasonal charter	
Lebanon	Beirut	Beirut–Rafic Hariri International Airport	Seasonal charter	
Moldova	Chișinău	Chișinău International Airport	Terminated	
Poland	Katowice	Katowice Airport	Terminated	
Russia	Moscow	Sheremetyevo International Airport	Seasonal charter	
Russia	Moscow	Vnukovo International Airport	Seasonal charter	
Russia	Yekaterinburg	Koltsovo Airport	Seasonal charter	
Slovenia	Ljubljana	Ljubljana Jože Pučnik Airport	Terminated	
Spain	Madrid	Madrid–Barajas Airport	Terminated	
Turkey	Istanbul	Istanbul Airport	Terminated	
United Arab Emirates	Dubai	Dubai International Airport	Terminated	
Uzbekistan	Tashkent	Islam Karimov Tashkent International Airport	Seasonal charter	

== Fleet ==
=== Current fleet ===
As of July 2026, Red Sea Airlines operates the following aircraft:

Red Sea Airlines fleet
Aircraft	In service	Orders	Passengers			Notes
Aircraft	In service	Orders	C	Y	Total	Notes
Boeing 737-800	4	1	—	189	189	
Boeing 737 MAX 8	—	2	TBA			
Total	4	3				

=== Former fleet ===
As of August 2025, Red Sea Airlines operated 4 Boeing 737-800
