= Ras Shokeir New Airport =

Airport in Egypt

Ras Shokeir New Airport Ras Shukhayr New
- IATA: none; ICAO: none

Summary
- Airport type: Public
- Serves: Ras Shokeir
- Elevation AMSL: 15 ft / 5 m
- Coordinates: 28°11′50″N 33°12′30″E

Map
- Location of the airport in Egypt

Runways
Direction	Length		Surface
Direction	m	ft	Surface
15/33	2,140	7,021	Asphalt
- Source: Google Maps

Ras Shokeir Airport is an airport serving the Suez Gulf town of Ras Shokeir, Egypt. The runway is along the coast 9 kilometres (5.6 mi) northwest of the town.

== See also ==
- Transport in Egypt
- List of airports in Egypt
