= El Gouna Airport =

El Gouna Airport Abu Shar Airport
- IATA: none; ICAO: HEGO

Summary
- Airport type: Public
- Serves: El Gouna
- Elevation AMSL: 56 ft / 17 m
- Coordinates: 27°22′00″N 33°40′05″E

Map
- Location of the airport in Egypt

Runways
| Direction | Length | | Surface |
| Direction | ft | m | Surface |
|---|---|---|---|
| 16/34 | 5,265 | 1,605 | Asphalt |
- Source: Google Maps GCM

El Gouna Airport (ICAO: HEGO) is an airport serving the Red Sea resort town of El Gouna, Egypt.

The Hurghada VOR-DME (Ident: HGD) is located 12.6 nautical miles off the threshold of runway 34.

== See also ==
- Transport in Egypt
- List of airports in Egypt
