= El Tor Airport =

- IATA: ELT; ICAO: HETR

Summary
- Airport type: Public
- Serves: El Tor, Egypt
- Elevation AMSL: 115 ft / 35 m
- Coordinates: 28°12′30″N 33°38′45″E

Map
- Location of the airport in Egypt

Runways
Direction	Length		Surface
Direction	ft	m	Surface
10/28	9,840	3,000	Asphalt
- Source: Google Maps

El Tor Airport (IATA: ELT, ICAO: HETR) is an airport serving the Suez Gulf port city of El Tor, Sinai Peninsula, Egypt.

== Airlines and destinations ==
There are currently no scheduled services to and from the airport.

== See also ==
- Transport in Egypt
- List of airports in Egypt
