= Sharq El Owainat Airport =

Airport in Egypt

- IATA: GSQ; ICAO: HEOW

Summary
- Airport type: Public
- Operator: Government
- Location: Sharq El Owainat, Egypt
- Elevation AMSL: 859 ft / 262 m
- Coordinates: 22°35′00″N 28°43′00″E

Map
- Location of airport in Egypt

Runways
| Direction | Length | | Surface |
| Direction | m | ft | Surface |
|---|---|---|---|
| 01/19 | 3,500 | 11,483 | Asphalt |
- Source: DAFIF GCM Google Maps

Sharq El Owainat Airport (IATA: GSQ, ICAO: HEOW) is a small airport serving Sharq El Owainat which is located in Western Desert of Egypt. The airport caters to the New Valley Governorate. In 2011, it served 6,559 passengers (-0.8% compared to 2010). Between 2018 and 2024 military facilities were constructed at the airport.

== Operations and facilities ==
The US$3 million airport was constructed in 3 months in 2003 to meet the needs of investors to bring equipment and to export crops. It occupies 36 square kilometres, with a main runway of 3500m and an apron that can serve 8 aircraft. A simple terminal building can serve passengers at a rate of 100 per hour. No automatic luggage conveyor is provided inside the terminal.

The Shark El Oweinat non-directional beacon (Ident: OWT) is located just east of the field. The Oweinat non-directional beacon (Ident: ENT) is located 9 nautical miles (17 km) west of the runway.

In August 2009, EgyptAir signed an agreement with a UAE-based agricultural investment firm Janan Investment Company to operate a weekly Sunday flight from the capital's Cairo International Airport to Sharq El Owainat Airport in order to serve the movement of workers and investors to encourage agricultural investment in the region.

The airport is managed under a Build-Operate-Transfer operation. The runway is not equipped with lights for night operation. The airport is in a free trade zone and has facilities for storing and packaging goods for export.

In February 2026 The New York Times reported that military facilities had been constructed at Sharq El Owainat Airport between 2018 and 2024, including a second runway and 17 aircraft hangars. Satellite images showed that Egyptian and Turkish military aircraft were using the airport, and it appeared to be a base for Turkish-built UAVs that were being operated by either the Sudanese or Egyptian governments to make attacks against the Rapid Support Forces as part of the Sudanese civil war.

== Airlines and destinations ==
No airlines currently operate from the airport.

== See also ==
- Transport in Egypt
- List of airports in Egypt
