= Dakhla Oasis Airport =

Closed airport in Dakhla Oasis, Egypt

- IATA: DAK; ICAO: HEDK

Summary
- Airport type: Public
- Serves: Dakhla Oasis
- Elevation AMSL: 613 ft (187 m)
- Coordinates: 25°24′40″N 29°00′10″E

Map
- Location of the airport in Egypt

Runways
Direction	Length		Surface
Direction	m	ft	Surface
15/33	2,475	8,125	Concrete
- Source: Google Maps

Dakhla Oasis Airport (IATA: DAK, ICAO: HEDK) is an airport serving the archaeological region of Dakhla Oasis, Egypt.

== See also ==
- Transport in Egypt
- List of airports in Egypt
