= Air Cairo =

Egyptian airline

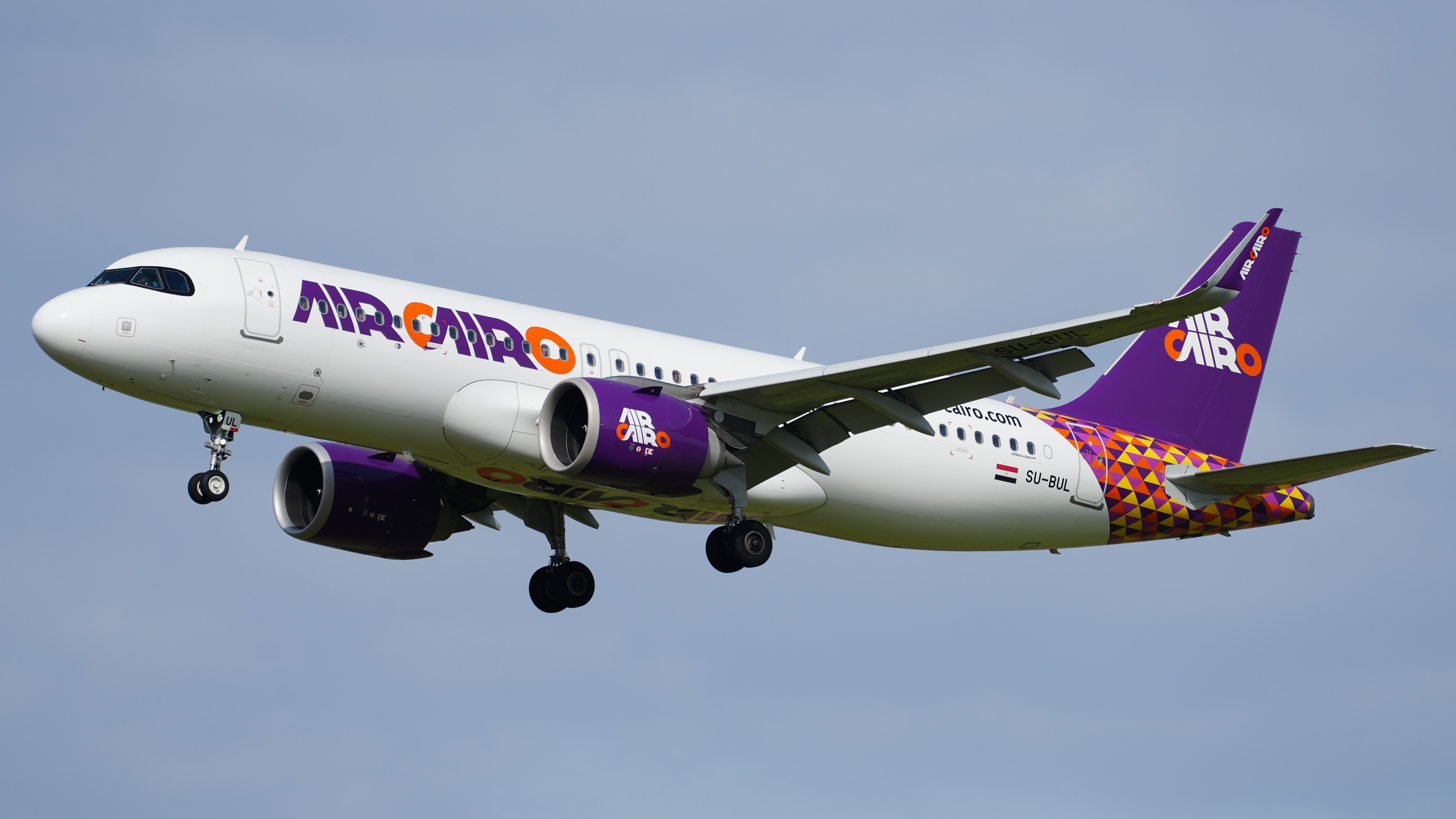
- Air Cairo Airbus A320neo
IATA	ICAO	Call sign
SM	MSC	AIR CAIRO
- Founded: 2003; 23 years ago
- Operating bases: Cairo; Hurghada; Sharm El Sheikh
- Fleet size: 39
- Destinations: 61
- Parent company: Egyptair (60%); 360 INVESTMENTS (40%)
- Headquarters: Cairo, Egypt
- Key people: Hussein Sherif (Chairman & CEO)
- Employees: 500
- Website: www.aircairo.com

Air Cairo is an airline based in Cairo, Egypt. The airline is part owned by Egyptair. Air Cairo operates scheduled flights to the Middle East and Europe and also operates charter flights to Egypt from Europe on behalf of tour operators. Its bases are Cairo International Airport, Sharm El Sheikh International Airport and Hurghada International Airport with the company head office located in the Sheraton Heliopolis Zone.

== History ==
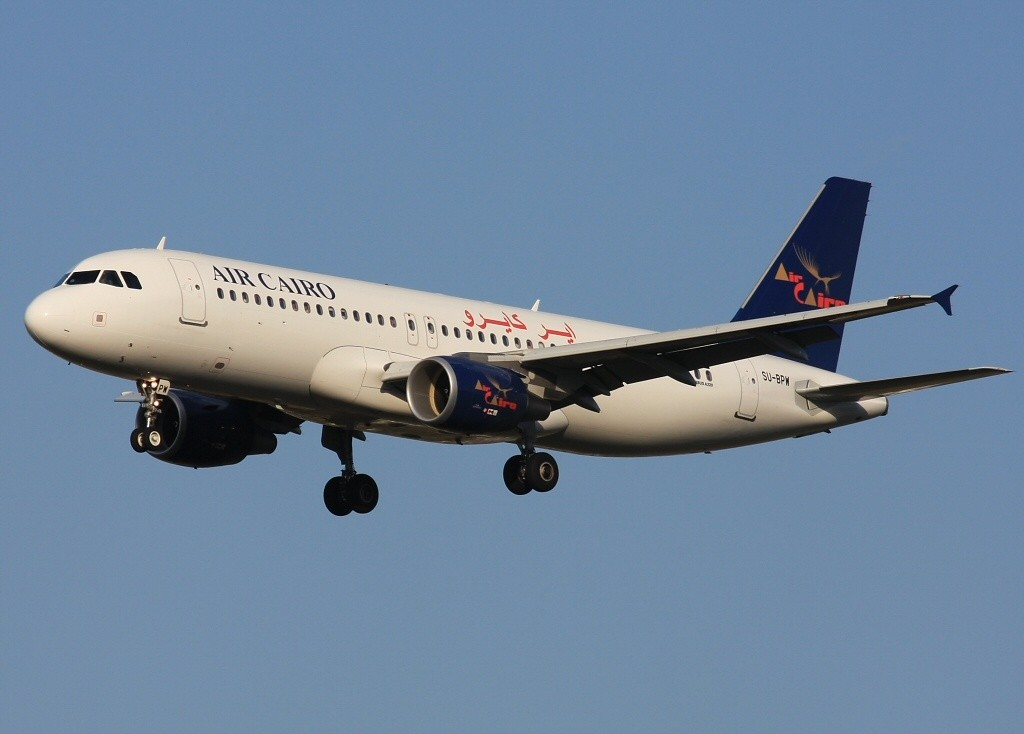
An Air Cairo Airbus A320-200 in the previous livery

The airline was established in 2003. It is owned by Egyptair (60%) and 360 Investments (40%).

Recently, the company is re-modeling towards the low fare model which is planned to be the strongest low fare airline in Egypt. On 1 June 2012 Air Cairo launched its first ever scheduled flight from Borg El Arab Airport Alexandria to Kuwait International Airport, Queen Alia International Airport, King Abdulaziz International Airport, Tripoli International Airport, Sabha Airport, Misrata Airport and King Khaled International Airport. Air Cairo also launched its scheduled flights from Hurghada International Airport to Belgrade Nikola Tesla Airport, but those flights were suspended in the end of December 2015.

On 5 November 2018, it was reported that the German aviation authority had banned Air Cairo - along with FlyEgypt - from flying to Germany, where it operated on behalf of German tour operators, due to regulatory violations. Shortly afterward major European tour operators such as Thomas Cook Group and TUI Group announced they would end their contracts with Air Cairo and FlyEgypt. Germany lifted its ban on 21 December.

In March 2019, it was reported that the airline would be leasing Embraer 170 aircraft for operations on the airline's domestic routes within Egypt.

In March 2021, Air Cairo announced it was to make a major push into the German-speaking market, having signed a sales cooperation agreement with SunExpress to market and manage up to 30 flights per week to the Red Sea resort of Hurghada from 14 airports in Germany, Austria, and Switzerland. Under the agreement, SunExpress would take care of all flight planning, revenue management, and sales, with Air Cairo operating the flights. In the course of the partnership, SunExpress and Air Cairo planned to expand the venture to other airports outside of German-speaking countries, SunExpress said in a statement. Air Cairo chairman and chief executive officer Hussein Sherif said the Benelux countries would be targeted next. The aim of the sales push was to boost tourism to Egypt to pre-Covid-19 levels.

In October 2024, Air Cairo and Egyptair signed a codeshare agreement, integrating the two carriers' networks more closely. Earlier that year, in March 2024, the airline had appointed Captain Ahmed Shanan as chairman and managing director, and by August 2024 it had taken delivery of its 25th Airbus, raising the total fleet to 34 aircraft.

During 2025, Air Cairo pursued an aggressive fleet-expansion programme. It agreed to lease four additional Airbus A320s from Macquarie AirFinance for delivery during the year and secured three Airbus A320neos for 2026, aiming to reach about 45 aircraft by the end of 2026. The carrier described its longer-term goal as roughly doubling the fleet to as many as 72 aircraft by 2029–2030, built around the A320neo, while evaluating the larger A321neo for longer-range leisure routes. In June 2025 it partnered with Acron Aviation to roll out a flight-data-monitoring system across its A320, ATR 72 and E190 fleet.

In November 2025, Air Cairo named Hussein Sherif as chairman of the board and chief executive officer, succeeding Captain Ahmed Shanan; Sherif had previously led the airline during an earlier period of fleet growth.

For the winter 2026–2027 season, Air Cairo expanded into the Nordic market, announcing new services from Oslo to both Cairo and Hurghada from late October 2026, operated with Airbus A320-family aircraft. Ahead of the 2026 Hajj season the airline also broadened its pilgrimage charter network, launching flights to Saudi Arabia from Italy, Germany and Niger, with operational support from Egyptair.

== Destinations ==
As of June 2026, Air Cairo operates scheduled services - without leisure charters - to the following airports:

Country	City	Airport	Notes	Refs
Albania	Tirana	Tirana International Airport Nënë Tereza		
Armenia	Yerevan	Zvartnots International Airport		
Austria	Vienna	Vienna International Airport		
Azerbaijan	Baku	Heydar Aliyev International Airport		
Bosnia and Herzegovina	Banja Luka	Banja Luka International Airport	Seasonal	
Bosnia and Herzegovina	Sarajevo	Sarajevo International Airport		
Burkina Faso	Ouagadougou	Thomas Sankara International Airport Ouagadougou		
Czech Republic	Prague	Václav Havel Airport Prague		
Denmark	Billund	Billund Airport	Terminated	
Denmark	Copenhagen	Copenhagen Airport	Terminated	
Egypt	Abu Simbel	Abu Simbel Airport		
Egypt	Alexandria	Borg El Arab International Airport	Base	
Egypt	Assiut	Assiut Airport		
Egypt	Aswan	Aswan International Airport		
Egypt	Cairo	Cairo International Airport	Base	
Egypt	El Dabaa	El Alamein International Airport	Seasonal	
Egypt	Giza	Sphinx International Airport		
Egypt	Hurghada	Hurghada International Airport	Base	
Egypt	Luxor	Luxor International Airport		
Egypt	Marsa Alam	Marsa Alam International Airport		
Egypt	Marsa Matruh	Marsa Matruh International Airport		
Egypt	Sharm El Sheikh	Sharm El Sheikh International Airport	Base	
Egypt	Sohag	Sohag International Airport		
Egypt	The New Capital	Capital International Airport		
France	Lyon	Lyon–Saint-Exupéry Airport	Seasonal	
France	Marseille	Marseille Provence Airport	Seasonal	
France	Nantes	Nantes Atlantique Airport	Seasonal	
France	Paris	Charles de Gaulle Airport	Seasonal	
Georgia	Tbilisi	Shota Rustaveli Tbilisi International Airport	Terminated	
Germany	Berlin	Berlin Brandenburg Airport		
Germany	Bremen	Bremen Airport	Terminated	
Germany	Cologne/Bonn	Cologne Bonn Airport		
Germany	Dresden	Dresden Airport	Seasonal	
Germany	Düsseldorf	Düsseldorf Airport		
Germany	Erfurt/Weimar	Erfurt–Weimar Airport	Seasonal	
Germany	Frankfurt	Frankfurt Airport		
Germany	Hamburg	Hamburg Airport		
Germany	Hannover	Hannover Airport		
Germany	Leipzig/Halle	Leipzig/Halle Airport		
Germany	Munich	Munich Airport		
Germany	Münster/Osnabrück	Münster Osnabrück Airport		
Germany	Nuremberg	Nuremberg Airport		
Germany	Stuttgart	Stuttgart Airport		
Hungary	Budapest	Budapest Ferenc Liszt International Airport		
Italy	Bari	Bari Karol Wojtyła Airport		
Italy	Bergamo	Milan Bergamo Airport	Terminated	
Italy	Bologna	Bologna Guglielmo Marconi Airport		
Italy	Catania	Catania–Fontanarossa Airport	Seasonal	
Italy	Milan	Milan Malpensa Airport		
Italy	Naples	Naples International Airport		
Italy	Rome	Rome Fiumicino Airport		
Italy	Venice	Venice Marco Polo Airport	Terminated	
Italy	Verona	Verona Villafranca Airport	Seasonal	
Jordan	Amman	Queen Alia International Airport		
Jordan	Aqaba	King Hussein International Airport	Terminated	
Kazakhstan	Almaty	Almaty International Airport		
Kazakhstan	Aqtöbe	Aliya Moldagulova International Airport		
Kazakhstan	Astana	Nursultan Nazarbayev International Airport		
Kazakhstan	Qostanai	Qostanai Airport	Seasonal	
Kuwait	Kuwait City	Kuwait International Airport		
Lebanon	Beirut	Beirut–Rafic Hariri International Airport		
Libya	Tripoli	Mitiga International Airport		
Morocco	Tangier	Tangier Ibn Battouta Airport		
North Macedonia	Skopje	Skopje International Airport		
Norway	Oslo	Oslo Airport	Seasonal; Begins October 2026	
Poland	Katowice	Katowice Airport		
Poland	Warsaw	Warsaw Chopin Airport		
Portugal	Lisbon	Lisbon Airport		
Qatar	Doha	Hamad International Airport		
Russia	Kaliningrad	Khrabrovo Airport	Seasonal charter	
Russia	Kazan	Ğabdulla Tuqay Kazan International Airport		
Russia	Moscow	Sheremetyevo International Airport	Seasonal	
Russia	Orenburg	Yury Gagarin Orenburg International Airport	Seasonal charter	
Russia	Perm	Bolshoye Savino Airport	Seasonal charter	
Russia	Saint Petersburg	Pulkovo Airport	Seasonal	
Russia	Tyumen	Roshchino Airport	Terminated	
Russia	Ufa	Mostay Kərim Ufa International Airport		
Russia	Volgograd	Volgograd International Airport	Seasonal charter	
Russia	Yekaterinburg	Koltsovo Airport	Seasonal	
Saudi Arabia	Abha	Abha International Airport		
Saudi Arabia	Al Jawf	Al Jouf Airport		
Saudi Arabia	Dammam	King Fahd International Airport		
Saudi Arabia	Gassim	Prince Nayef bin Abdulaziz International Airport		
Saudi Arabia	Jeddah	King Abdulaziz International Airport		
Saudi Arabia	Jizan	King Abdullah bin Abdulaziz Airport		
Saudi Arabia	Medina	Prince Mohammad Bin Abdulaziz Airport		
Saudi Arabia	Riyadh	King Khalid International Airport		
Saudi Arabia	Sakakah	Al Jawf International Airport		
Saudi Arabia	Tabuk	Prince Sultan bin Abdulaziz Airport		
Saudi Arabia	Yanbu	Prince Abdul Mohsin Bin Abdulaziz International Airport		
Senegal	Dakar	Blaise Diagne International Airport	Terminated	
Serbia	Belgrade	Belgrade Nikola Tesla Airport		
Slovakia	Bratislava	Bratislava Airport		
Spain	Bilbao	Bilbao Airport		
Spain	Málaga	Málaga Airport		
Spain	Valencia	Valencia Airport		
Switzerland	Zurich	Zurich Airport		
Switzerland; France; Germany	Basel; Mulhouse; Freiburg	EuroAirport Basel Mulhouse Freiburg		
Turkey	Istanbul	Istanbul Airport		
Turkey	Istanbul	Sabiha Gökçen International Airport		
United Arab Emirates	Sharjah	Sharjah International Airport		
Uzbekistan	Tashkent	Tashkent International Airport		

=== Codeshare agreements ===
Air Cairo has a codeshare agreement with Egyptair, signed in October 2024.

In addition, Air Cairo has a sales cooperation agreement with SunExpress to market and manage up to 30 flights per week to the Red Sea resort of Hurghada from 14 airports in Germany, Austria, and Switzerland.

== Fleet ==
Air Cairo ATR 72-600

As of July 2026, Air Cairo operates the following aircraft:

Air Cairo fleet
Aircraft	In service	Orders	Passengers	Notes
Airbus A320-200	12	—	174	Four delivered in 2025
Airbus A320neo	18	15	186	Further deliveries due in 2026
ATR 72-600	6	—	70	
Embraer 190	3	—	110	
Total	39	—		
