= El Alamein International Airport =

Airport serving El Alamein, Egypt

El Alamain International Airport مطار العلمين الدولي
- IATA: DBB; ICAO: HEAL

Summary
- Airport type: Public
- Owner/Operator: International Airports Company
- Serves: El Alamein
- Location: Matrouh Governorate, Egypt
- Elevation AMSL: 143 ft (44 m)
- Coordinates: 30°55′28″N 28°27′41″E

Map
- Location of airport in Egypt

Runways
Direction	Length		Surface
Direction	m	ft	Surface
13/31	3,499	11,479	Asphalt
- Sources: DAFIF

El Alamein International Airport (IATA: DBB, ICAO: HEAL) (Arabic: مطار العلمين الدولي Maṭār El ʿAlamein El Dawli) is an international airport located in El Alamein, Matrouh Governorate, Egypt. The airport is located at the Northern coast, 160 km (99 mi) west of Alexandria.

== Operations ==
=== Overview ===
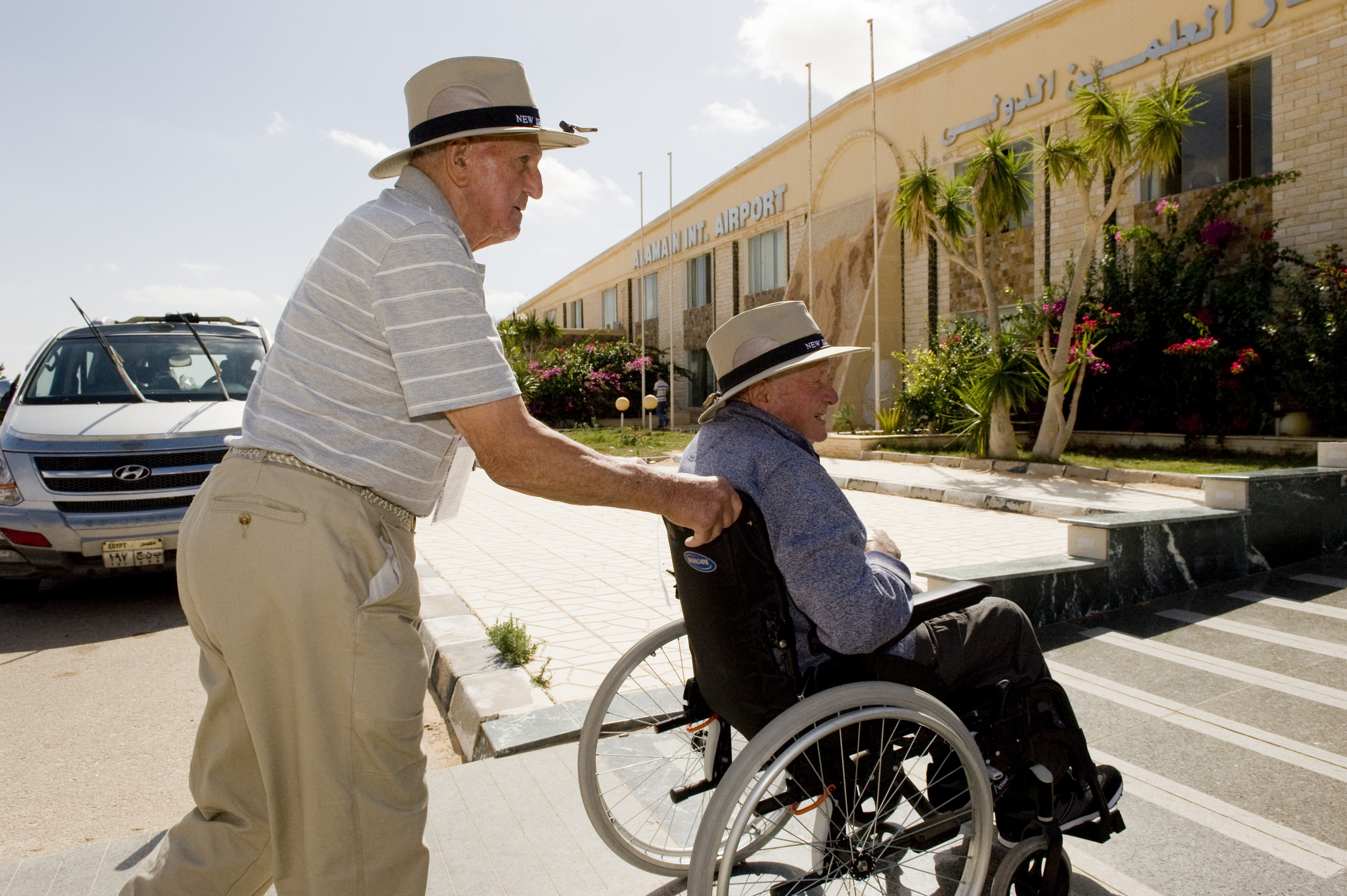
New Zealander war veterans, served in World War II, departing Al Alamain International Airport.

El Alamein International Airport is owned and operated by International Airports Company which is KATO investment subsidiary. On 1999, a bid for build–operate–transfer (BOT) was won by International Airport Company of 50-year extendable concession.

The airport occupies an area of 64 square kilometres (25 sq mi) with a single terminal which can handle 600 passengers per hour.

=== Runways ===
El Alamein International Airport has a single runway 3,499 m (11,480 ft), suitable for A380-800 operations.

== Airlines and destinations ==
Airlines	Destinations
Air Cairo	Seasonal: Almaty, Catania, Milan–Malpensa, Moscow–Sheremetyevo; Seasonal charter: Bratislava, Kazan, Yerevan
Air Serbia	Seasonal charter: Belgrade
Belavia	Seasonal charter: Brest, Minsk
Etihad Airways	Seasonal: Abu Dhabi
Flydubai	Seasonal: Dubai–International
Flynas	Seasonal: Jeddah, Riyadh
Gulf Air	Seasonal: Bahrain
Red Sea Airlines	Seasonal charter: Moscow–Vnukovo
Saudia	Seasonal: Jeddah, Riyadh
Smartwings	Seasonal charter: Bratislava, Prague
Southwind Airlines	Seasonal charter: Antalya

== See also ==
- List of airports in Egypt
- Transport in Egypt
