= International Coastal Road =

Road in Egypt

Location
- Country: Egypt

Highway system
- Transport in Egypt

The International Coastal Road in Egypt connects the country with the Maghreb region through the border crossing in Sallum and ends in Port Said in the opposite direction. It runs along the coast of Mediterranean Sea and through the beach city New Damietta. It has made road traffic and transportation easier and faster between the ports of New Damietta and Alexandria.

The road was officially opened in 2002 by President Husni Mubarak.
