= El Kharga Airport =

El Kharga Airport New Valley Airport
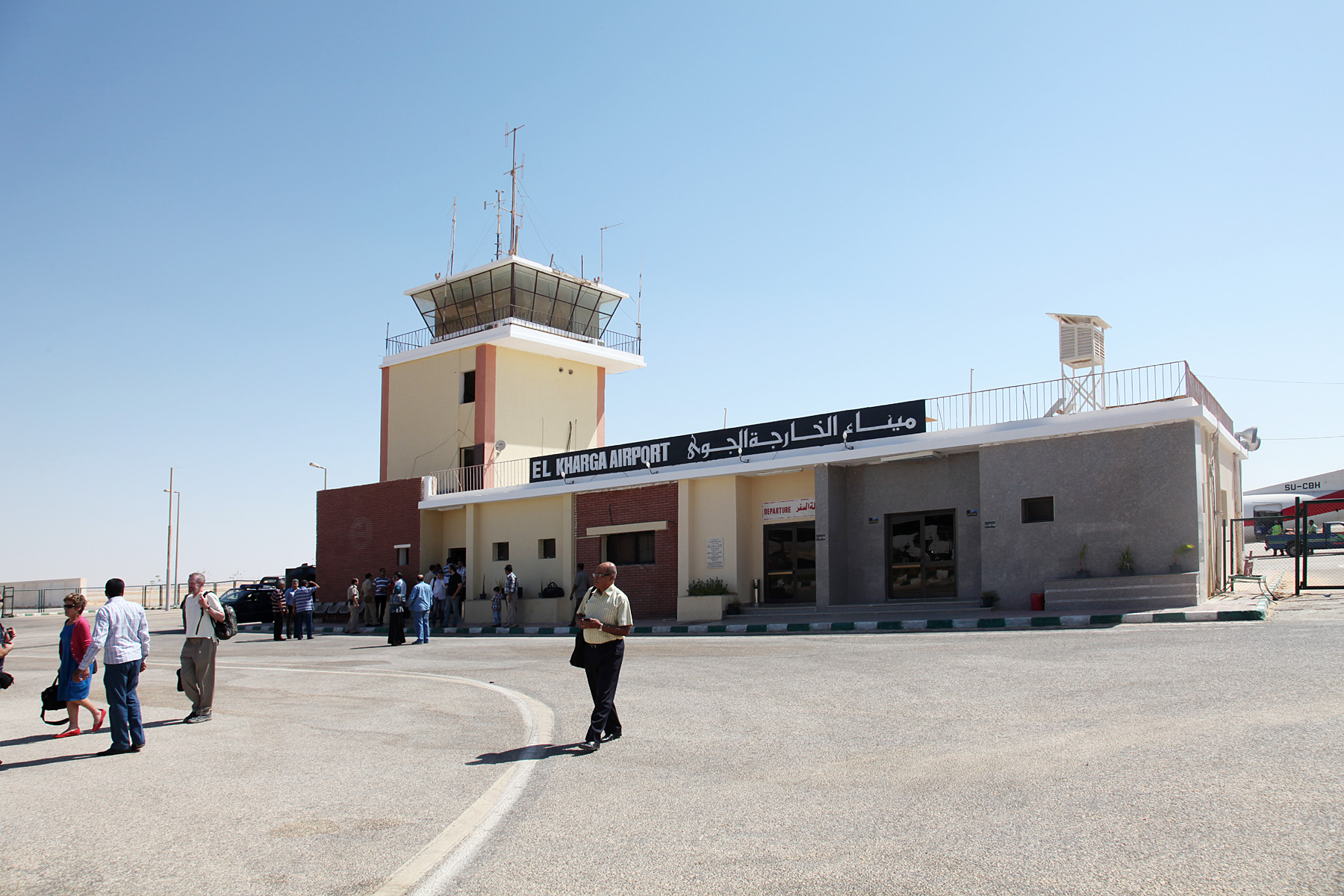
- IATA: UVL; ICAO: HEKG

Summary
- Airport type: Public
- Serves: El Kharga
- Elevation AMSL: 192 ft / 59 m
- Coordinates: 25°28′25″N 30°35′25″E

Map
- Location of the airport in Egypt

Runways
Direction	Length		Surface
Direction	ft	m	Surface
18/36	11,482	3,500	Asphalt
- Source: Google Maps

El Kharga Airport (IATA: UVL, ICAO: HEKG) is an airport serving the city of El Kharga, Egypt.

== Airlines and destinations ==
Airlines	Destinations
Egyptair	Cairo
Petroleum Air Services	Seasonal Charter: Cairo

== See also ==
- Transport in Egypt
- List of airports in Egypt
