= Sharq El Owainat =

Desert land reclamation project started in 1991

Coordinates: 22.5829°N 28.7073°E

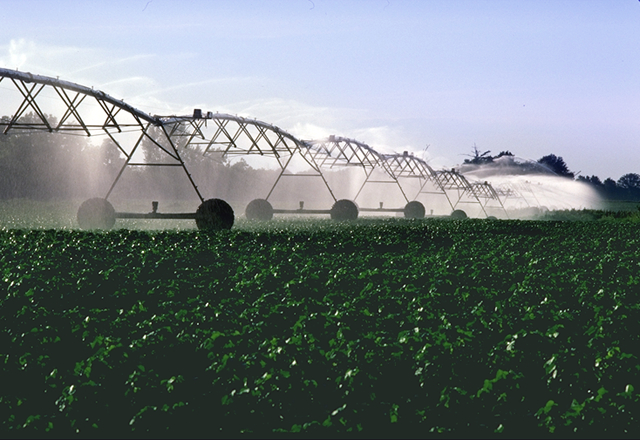
Irrigation system in East Owainat.

Sharq El Owainat, or East Oweinat is a 110,000 acre desert land reclamation project that started in 1991, in the New Valley Governorate, Egypt. It is in a remote location in the Western Desert in the extreme south-west of the country, east of Oweinat Mountain, delimiting Egypt's south western border with Libya and Sudan. The project is operated by the Egyptian Military's National Company for Reclamation and Agriculture in East Oweinat, and in 2021 a further 1.4 million acres were added to its concession.

== Water management ==
The Sharq El Owainat project depends on “fossil water” from the Nubian Sandstone Aquifer, which recharges slowly and is considered a non-renewable resource. The water is pumped from underground and delivered to sprinklers that rotate around a central pivot point, creating green crop circles.

== Operators ==
The initial phase of the project resulted in 27,000 feddans of barren desert land was converted to fertile land. There are about 400 water wells in the area with a further 250 under construction. There is also a nursery that includes 26 greenhouses.

The National Company for Reclamation and Agriculture in East Oweinat has undertaken a large part of the land cultivation, in addition to selling vast plots to other government agencies. The Awkaf Agency owns 48,000 acres of which it has cultivated 20,000.

In addition to Egyptian government companies, a number of private and foreign companies operate in Oweinat. For example, the United Arab Emirates' Jenaan owns 50,000 acres and Al Dahra 23,500 acres. Jenaan's agreement also included signing an agreement with the national airline of Egypt, EgyptAir Express (subsidiary of EgyptAir), to operate a weekly flight from Cairo International Airport to Sharq El Owainat Airport in order to serve the movement of workers and investors to encourage agricultural investment in the region. The flights began 1 November 2009 for an initial 1-year period.

Their cultivation works are seen by some researchers as part of a UAE policy towards consolidating a pivotal role as a food re-export hub, intensifying the industrialisation and commodification of agriculture in the region.

== See also ==
- Sharq El Owainat Airport
- New Valley Governorate
- Toshka
- New Valley Project
