= Marsa Alam International Airport =

Airport in Egypt

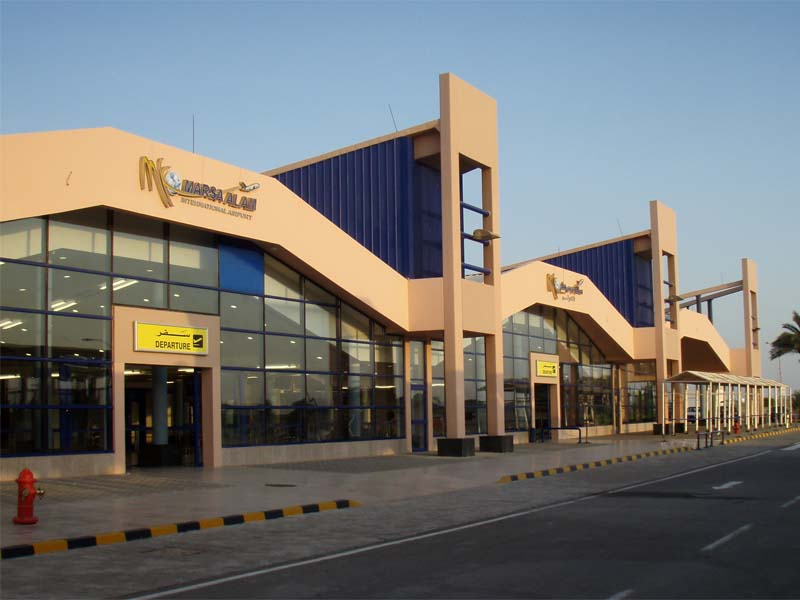
- IATA: RMF; ICAO: HEMA

Summary
- Airport type: Public
- Owner: EMAK Marsa Alam for Managing and Operating Airports SAE
- Operator: M.A. Al-Kharafi Group of Kuwait
- Serves: Marsa Alam, Egypt
- Elevation AMSL: 251 ft (77 m)
- Coordinates: 25°33′25″N 34°35′01″E
- Website: https://marsaalam-airport.com

Map
- Location of airport in Egypt

Runways
Direction	Length		Surface
Direction	m	ft	Surface
15/33	3,000	9,843	Asphalt

Statistics (2012)
- Passengers: 1,089,000
- Sources: DAFIF Page 6

Marsa Alam International Airport (IATA: RMF, ICAO: HEMA) is an international airport located 60 km north of Marsa Alam in Egypt. It is an important destination for leisure flights from Europe.

== Airlines and destinations ==
The following airlines operate regular scheduled and charter flights at Marsa Alam Airport:

Airlines	Destinations
Air Cairo	Cologne/Bonn, Düsseldorf, Frankfurt, Hannover, Munich, Stuttgart, Vienna, Zürich
Corendon Airlines	Cologne/Bonn
EasyJet	Milan–Malpensa; Seasonal: Berlin, Geneva
Edelweiss Air	Zürich
Egyptair	Cairo
Enter Air	Charter: Gdańsk
Eurowings	Seasonal: Düsseldorf, Salzburg
Lufthansa	Seasonal: Munich
Neos	Bergamo, Bologna, Milan–Malpensa, Rome–Fiumicino, Verona
Smartwings	Prague; Seasonal: Brno, Ostrava, Wroclaw; Seasonal charter: Bratislava, Budapest
TUI Airways	Seasonal: London–Gatwick
TUI fly Deutschland	Seasonal: Düsseldorf, Frankfurt, Munich
TUI fly Netherlands	Amsterdam
Wizz Air	Gdańsk, Katowice; Seasonal: Rome–Fiumicino, Warsaw–Modlin

== See also ==
- List of airports in Egypt
- List of the busiest airports in the Middle East
