= Marsa Matruh International Airport =

Marsa Matruh International Airport مطار مرسى مطروح الدولي
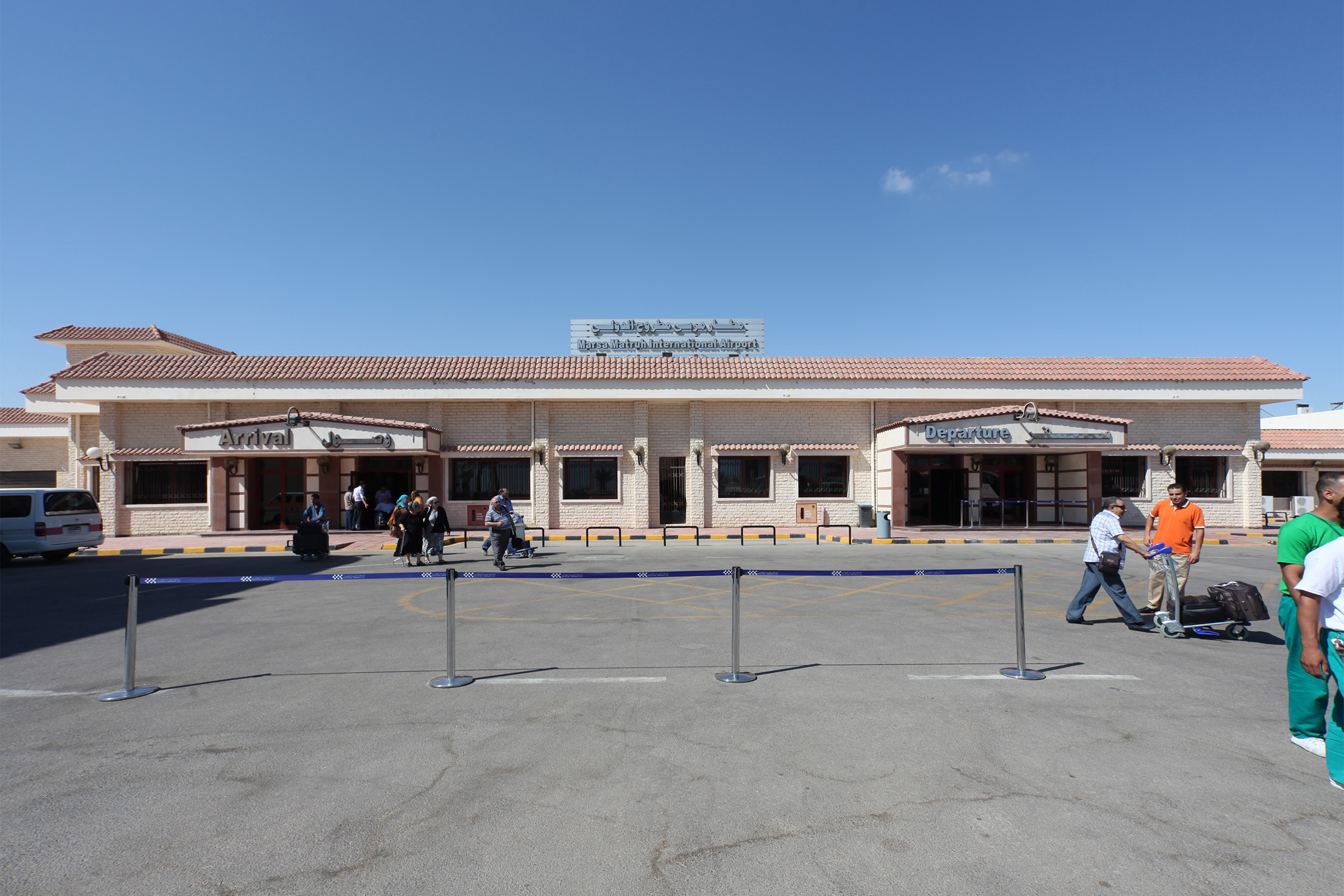
- IATA: MUH; ICAO: HEMM

Summary
- Airport type: Public
- Operator: Government
- Serves: Mersa Matruh, Egypt
- Elevation AMSL: 94 ft (29 m)
- Coordinates: 31°19′30″N 27°13′20″E

Map
- Location of airport in Egypt

Runways
Direction	Length		Surface
Direction	m	ft	Surface
06/24	3,000	9,843	Asphalt
15/33	3,000	9,843	Asphalt
- Source: DAFIF GCM

Marsa Matruh International Airport, formerly Mersa Matruh Airport (Arabic: مطار مرسى مطروح الدولي) (IATA: MUH, ICAO: HEMM), is an international airport in Marsa Matrouh, Egypt. In 2011, the airport served 99,515 passengers (−13.7% compared to 2010).

== Airlines and destinations ==
The following airlines operate regular scheduled and charter flights at Marsa Matruh Airport:

Airlines	Destinations
Air Serbia	Seasonal charter: Belgrade
Neos	Seasonal: Milan–Malpensa, Rome–Fiumicino, Verona
Smartwings	Seasonal charter: Bratislava, Brno, Katowice, Ostrava, Prague

== Military operations ==
Mersa Matruh Air Base (possibly collocated with the civilian field) hosts the 102nd Tactical Fighter Brigade, with 26 Squadron flying the F-7 and FT-7 and an 82 Squadron detachment flying the Mirage 2000BM and 2000EM.

== See also ==
- Transport in Egypt
- List of airports in Egypt
