= Ras Shokeir =

Ras Shukheir رأس شقير
- Location in Egypt
- Coordinates: 28.131414°N 33.248477°E
- Country: Egypt
- Governorate: Red Sea Governorate
- Time zone: UTC+2 (EET)
  - Summer (DST): UTC+3 (EEST)

Ras Shukheir (Arabic: رأس شقير) is an area to the north of Hurghada in the Red Sea Governorate, Egypt. There is an Oil and Gas Facility in the area with the same name. There is also an airport there.

== See also ==
- List of cities in Egypt
