= Marsa Alam =

Town in the Red Sea Governorate, Egypt

Marsa Alam مرسى علم
- town
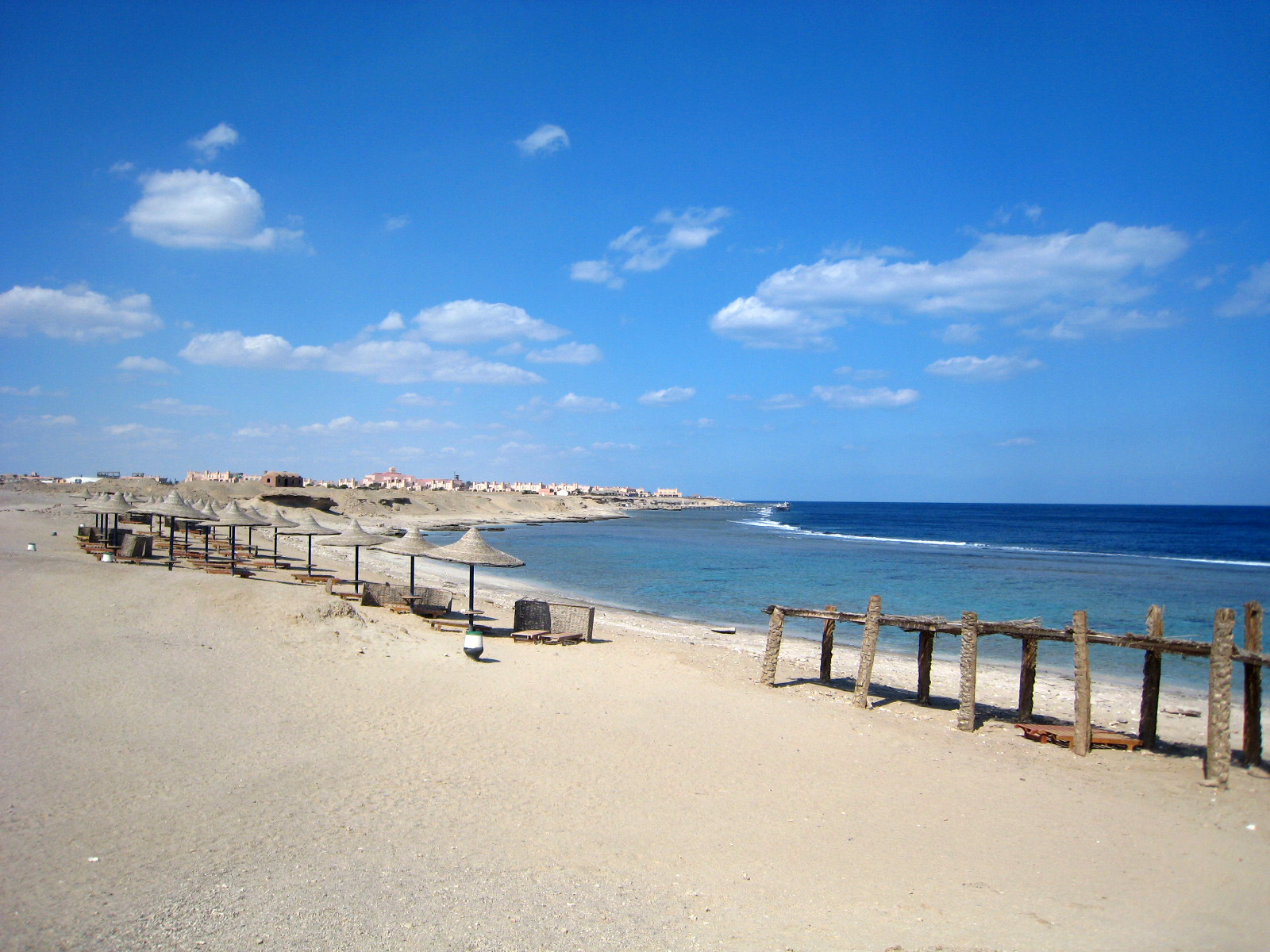
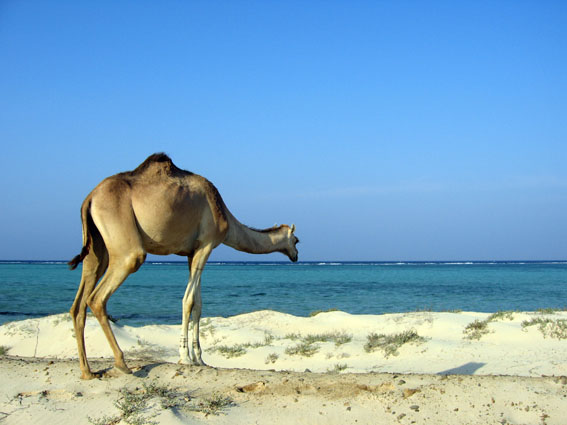
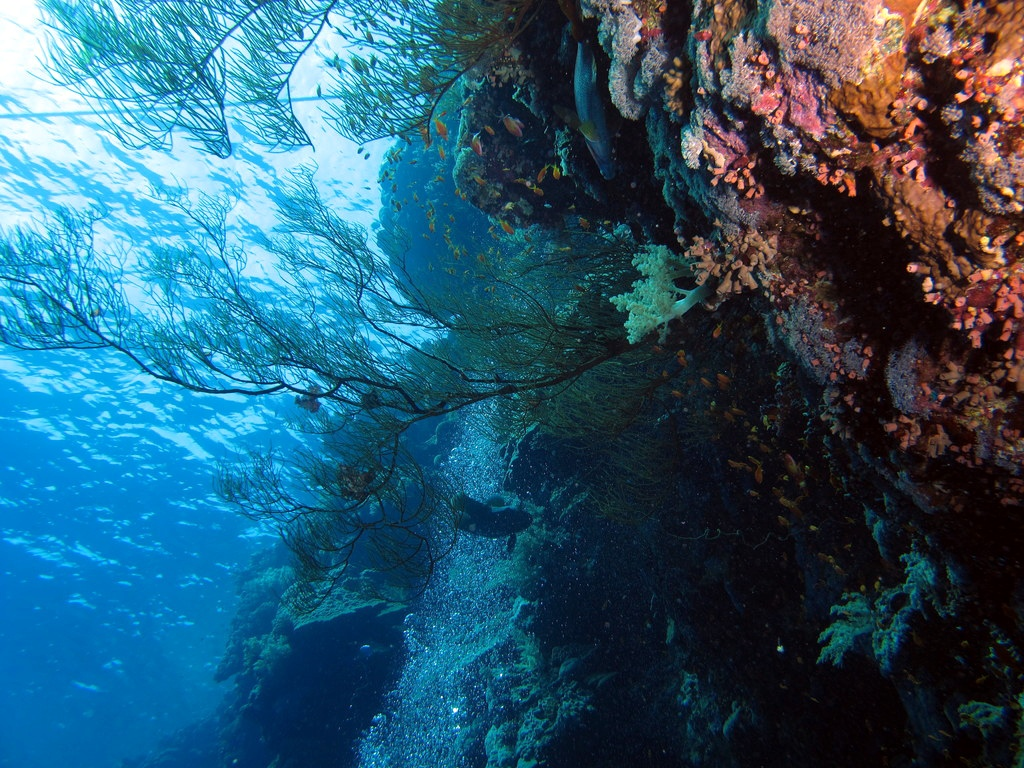
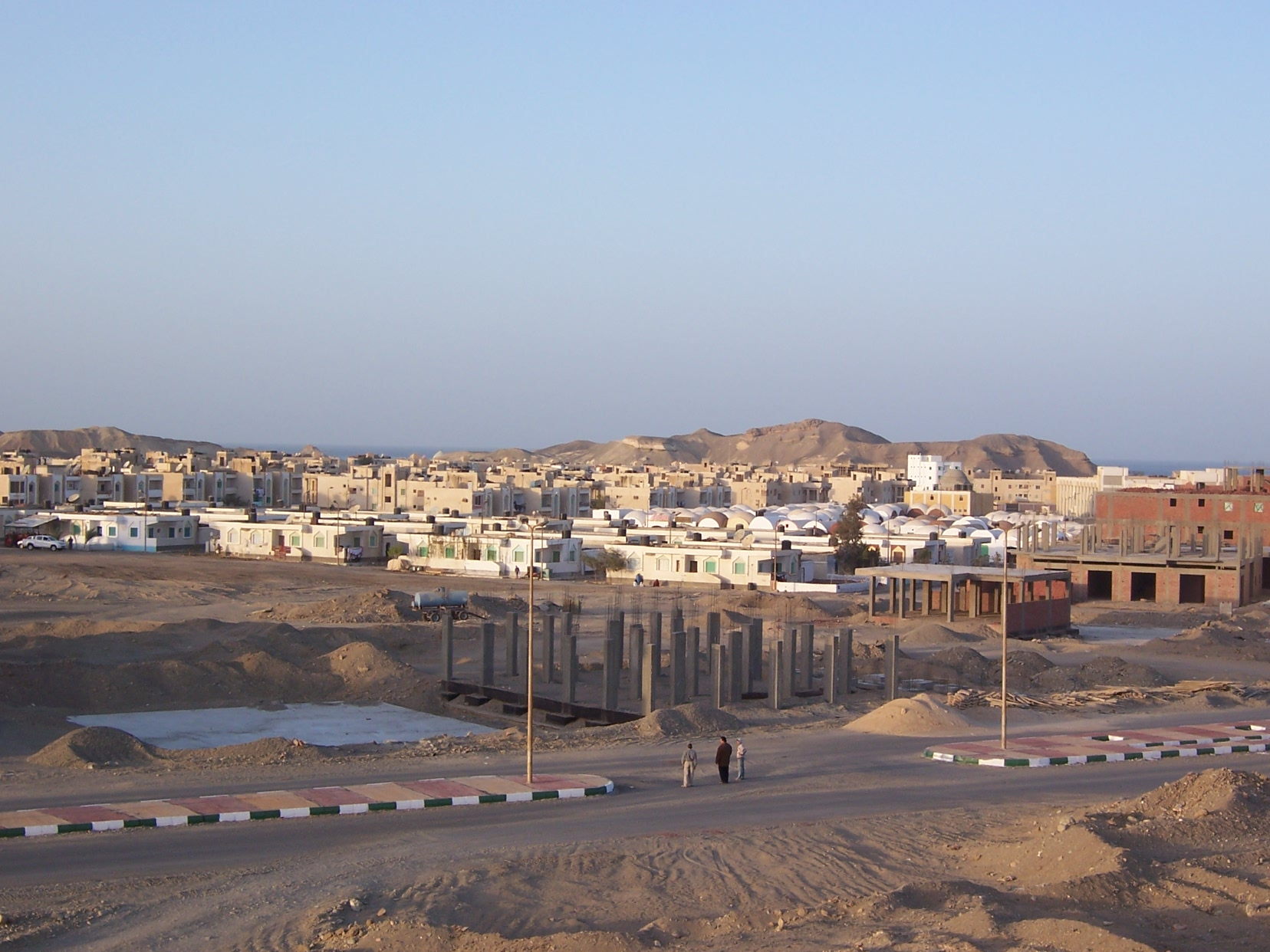
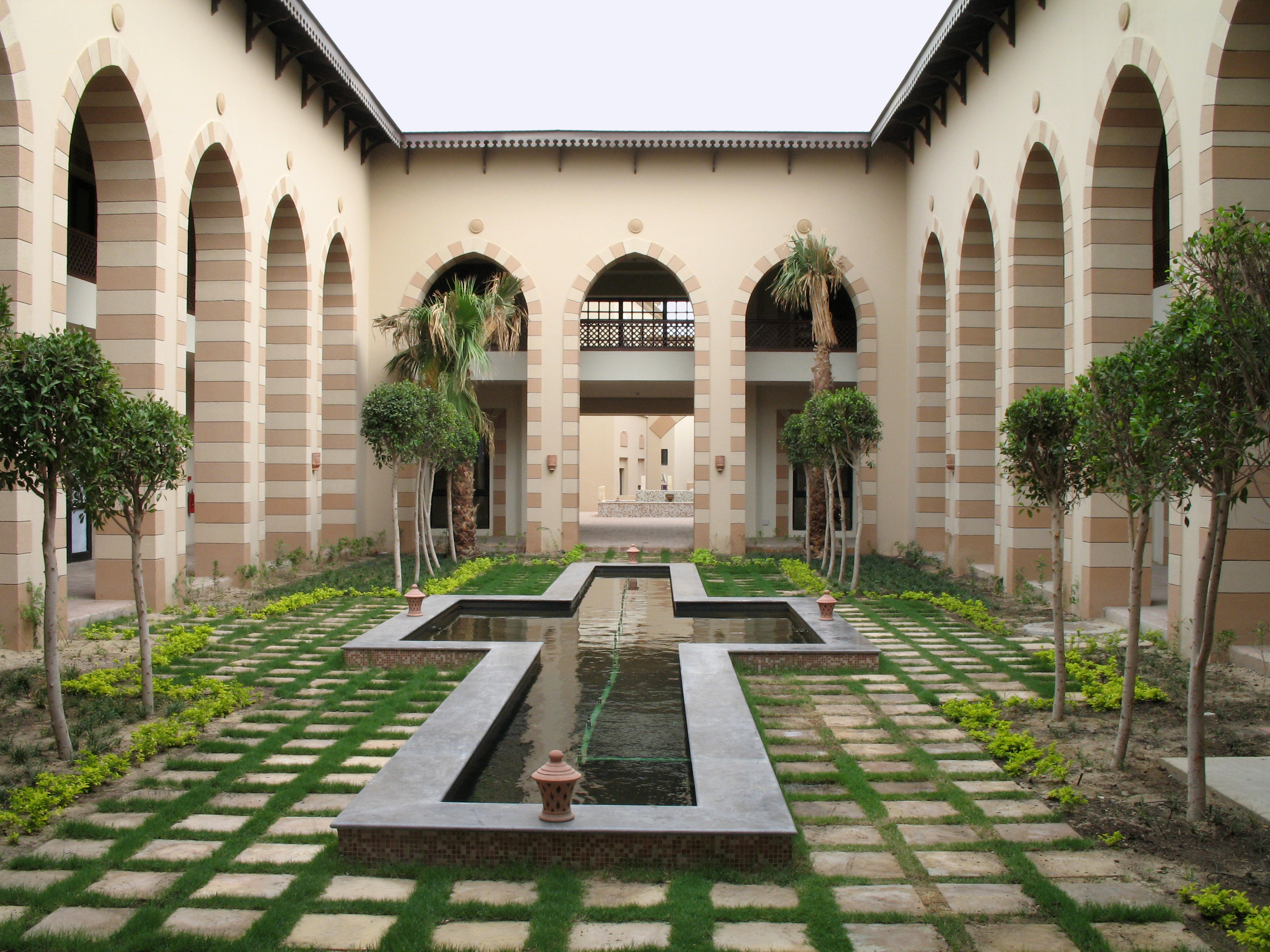
- Overview of Marsa Alam

- Location in Egypt
- Coordinates: 25°04′N 34°54′E
- Country: Egypt
- Governorate: Red Sea Governorate

Area
  - Total: 5,476 sq mi (14,184 km^{2})
- Elevation: 59 ft (18 m)

Population (2021)
  - Total: 9,001
  - Density: 1.644/sq mi (0.6346/km^{2})
- Time zone: UTC+2 (EET)
  - Summer (DST): UTC+3 (EEST)

Marsa Alam (Arabic: مَرْسَىٰ عَلَم Marsā ʿAlam [ˈmæɾsæ ˈʕælæm], Classical Arabic lit. 'Anchorage Mountain') is a tourist town in south-eastern Egypt, located on the western shore of the Red Sea. It is described as a "popular" tourist destination. Marsa Alam is a relatively recently built town; its development began in 1995 through the investments of the Kuwaiti Al-Kharafi Group, which established the town and its initial facilities, resorts and infrastructure. Its growth was accelerated by the opening of Marsa Alam International Airport in 2003. Due to its crystal clear water and its white sandy beaches, it is also known as the "Egyptian Maldives."

== Geography ==
The region covers an area of 38,433 km^{2} and sits at an elevation of approximately 60 meters above sea level. It is located 274 km south of Hurghada and 134 km south of Qusayr. It is inhabited by about 11,497 residents.

== Climate ==
Despite being over 135 miles (217 km) north of the tropical zone, the city experiences a tropical hot desert climate (Köppen: BWh), with steadier temperatures than places to the north such as Hurghada and Sharm el Sheikh. Among major Egyptian cities and resorts, Marsa Alam, Kosseir and Sharm el-Sheikh have the warmest nighttime temperatures. Average maximum temperatures during January typically range from 22 to 25 °C (72 to 77 °F) and in August 33 to 40 °C (91 to 104 °F).

The temperature of the Red Sea at this location during the year ranges from 22 to 29 °C (72 to 84 °F).

The highest record temperature was 45 °C (113 °F), recorded on May 10, 2010, while the lowest record temperature was 5 °C (41 °F), recorded on January 3, 2008.

Climate data for Marsa Alam
Month	Jan	Feb	Mar	Apr	May	Jun	Jul	Aug	Sep	Oct	Nov	Dec	Year
Record high °C (°F)	29 (84)	32 (90)	35 (95)	39 (102)	45 (113)	43 (109)	43 (109)	42 (108)	39 (102)	38 (100)	34 (93)	31 (88)	45 (113)
Mean daily maximum °C (°F)	24.1 (75.4)	25.1 (77.2)	26.9 (80.4)	29.8 (85.6)	33.1 (91.6)	34.7 (94.5)	35.5 (95.9)	35.6 (96.1)	34.2 (93.6)	32.6 (90.7)	29.3 (84.7)	25.5 (77.9)	30.5 (87.0)
Daily mean °C (°F)	18.6 (65.5)	19.4 (66.9)	21.4 (70.5)	24.2 (75.6)	27.9 (82.2)	29.5 (85.1)	30.5 (86.9)	30.8 (87.4)	29.3 (84.7)	27.4 (81.3)	24.0 (75.2)	20.1 (68.2)	25.3 (77.5)
Mean daily minimum °C (°F)	13.2 (55.8)	13.8 (56.8)	15.9 (60.6)	18.7 (65.7)	22.7 (72.9)	24.3 (75.7)	25.5 (77.9)	26.0 (78.8)	24.4 (75.9)	22.3 (72.1)	18.7 (65.7)	14.8 (58.6)	20.0 (68.0)
Record low °C (°F)	5 (41)	8 (46)	11 (52)	15 (59)	16 (61)	19 (66)	22 (72)	20 (68)	19 (66)	15 (59)	12 (54)	10 (50)	5 (41)
Average precipitation mm (inches)	0 (0)	0 (0)	0 (0)	0 (0)	0 (0)	0 (0)	0 (0)	0 (0)	0 (0)	1 (0.0)	3 (0.1)	1 (0.0)	5 (0.1)
Average rainy days	0	0	0	0	0	0	0	0	0	0	0	0	0
Mean monthly sunshine hours	279	283	310	330	372	390	403	372	330	310	300	279	3,958
Source 1: Climate-Data.org, Weather2Travel for sunshine and rainy days
Source 2: Voodoo Skies and MarsaAlam.com for record temperatures, HolidayCheck.com

Marsa Alam mean sea temperature
Jan	Feb	Mar	Apr	May	Jun	Jul	Aug	Sep	Oct	Nov	Dec
73 °F 23 °C	72 °F 22 °C	72 °F 22 °C	73 °F 23 °C	77 °F 25 °C	81 °F 27 °C	82 °F 28 °C	84 °F 29 °C	82 °F 28 °C	81 °F 27 °C	79 °F 26 °C	75 °F 24 °C

== Tourist activities ==
Beaches near Marsa Alam include Abu Dabba. There, tourists report seeing turtles, dolphins, sharks and marine wildlife like crocodilefish and octopuses.

Marsa Alam is also known a kitesurfing destination and starting point for safaris. The town is located near some historic emerald mines and the Temple of Seti I at Khanais.

=== Wadi El Gemal National Park ===
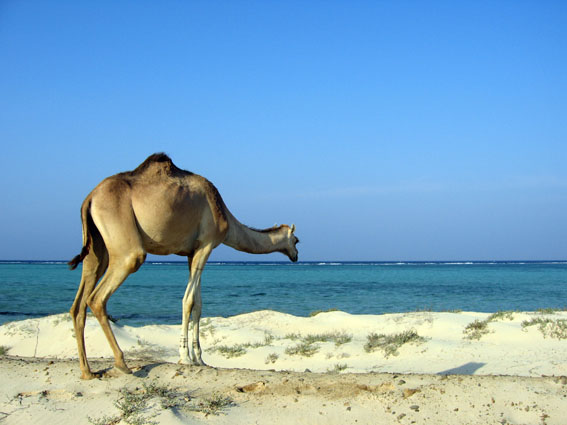
Camels in the reserve

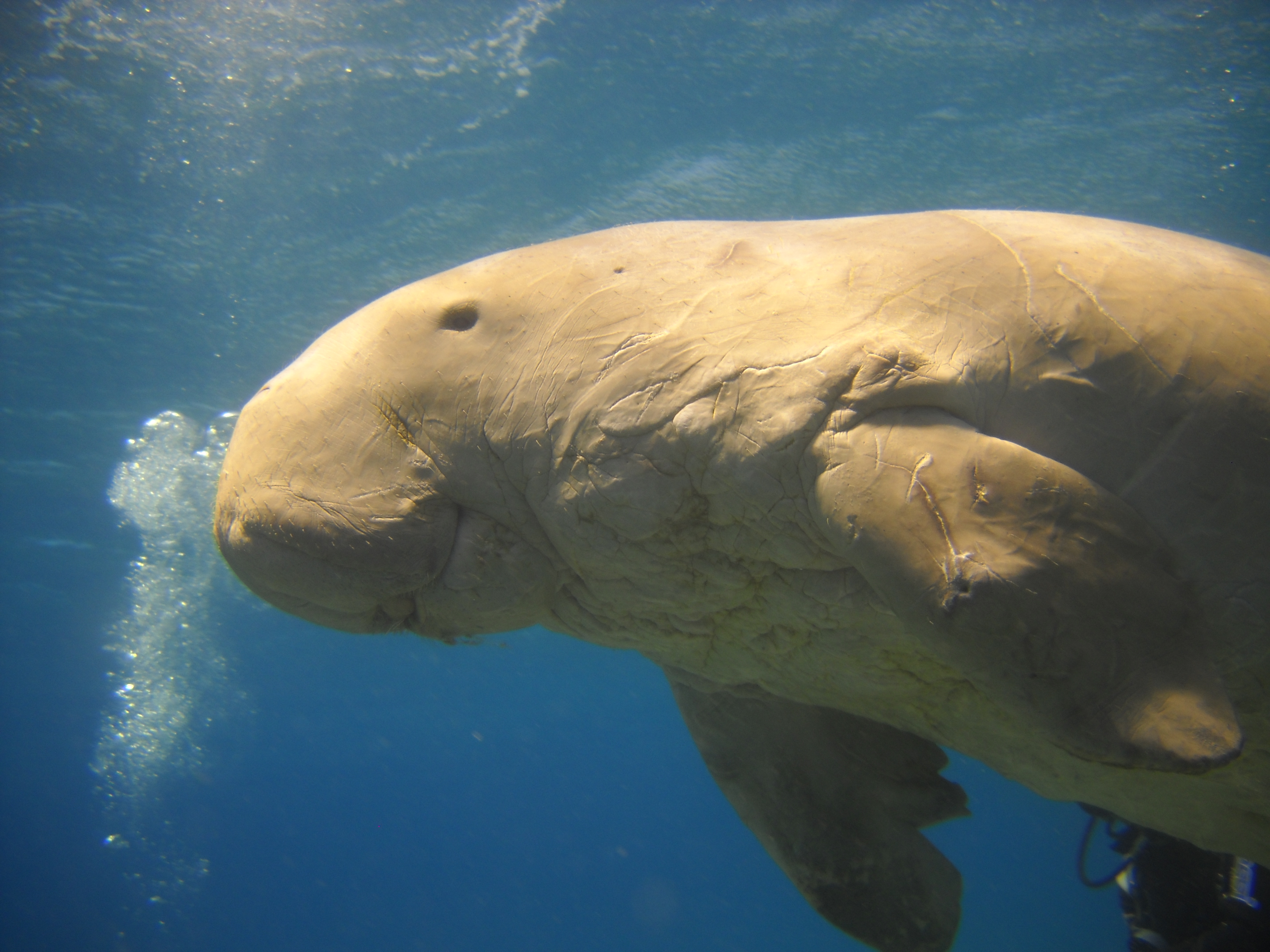
Dugong in Marsa Alam, 2011

The Wadi El Gemal National Park covers an area of approximately 7,450 km^{2}, including a land area of 4,770 km^{2}, and a marine area of 2,100 km^{2}. It covers 60 km of the Red Sea coast and includes the Wadi El Gemal islands, coral reefs and seaweed clusters, in addition to Mount Hamata, which is located at the beginning of the reserve. A flowing freshwater source mixes with seawater and forms a low-salinity marsh.

The reserve is divided into several areas: the Wadi El Gemal Island area, which has the second largest population of the sooty falcon; the Hankawareb area, which is 18 km south of Wadi El Gemal, is characterized by beaches and coral reefs; and the Qalaan area, 9 km north of the village. The Hamata area is characterized by the presence of vast areas of mangrove and many types of endemic and migratory birds. The Hamata Islands area, located two miles from the beach opposite the village of Hamata, is characterized by places for swimming and diving activities.

The valley was given its name due to the presence of a plant in that area that is palatable to camels.

Wildlife and marine life are active in the reserve, including mountain goat “ibex”, dorcas gazelle, which is also known as the afri, the aril gazelle, which is one of the smallest and most common species of deer, ibex, antelope, and more than 13 species of birds, including the sunset falcon. Marine life includes four species of sea crab, dugong, green turtles, whale shark, mermaid fish, dolphin, and more than 13 species of small fish. The local fauna includes 141 species of plants, including mangrove trees, swamp herbs, and doum palms.

The area also includes the antique Temple of Sket, located 60 km inside Wadi El Gemal. The reserve has four entrances, and three administrative offices have been established, in addition to a museum for the Ababda tribes in which the tools they use are displayed. Tribal women are also taught how to market and sell handicrafts. The Ministry of Environment provides patrols to enforce environmental law and provide environmental monitoring.

== Transportation ==
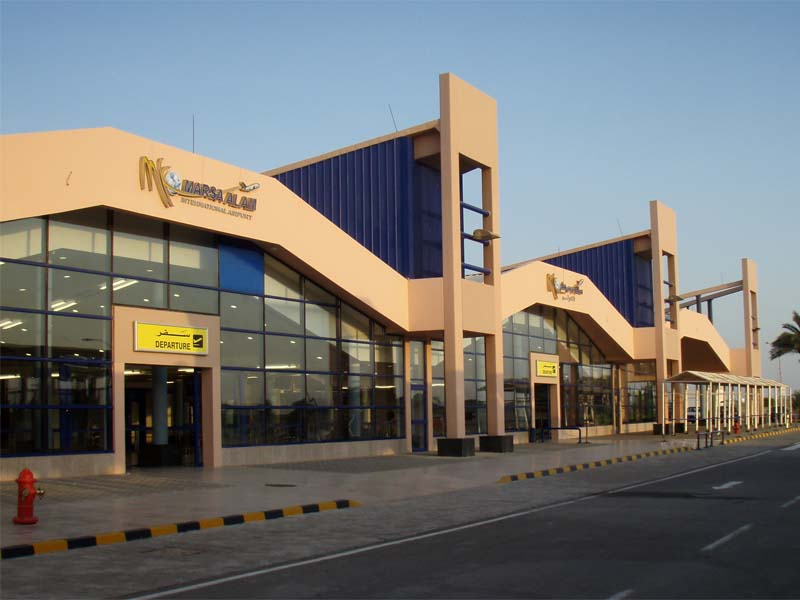
Marsa Alam International Airport

=== Marsa Alam International Airport ===
Work began on Marsa Alam International Airport in March 1999. It was opened for commercial aviation in October 2001, and it was officially opened in October 2003 with a capacity of up to 600 passengers/hour. It was established with the aim of serving the coastal region in the south of Red Sea from the city of Al-Qusayr to the city of Marsa Alam, with a length of 120 km. The airport is 34 nautical miles northwest of Marsa Alam, and 210 km south of Hurghada. Flights include origins in Italy, Germany, France and England for the purpose of tourism. The airport includes a passenger building located on an area of 5,000 square meters.

The airport is managed and operated by IMAC Airport Management and Operations Company, one of the Kuwait Al-Kharafi Group, using the build–operate–transfer system.

=== Yacht Marina ===
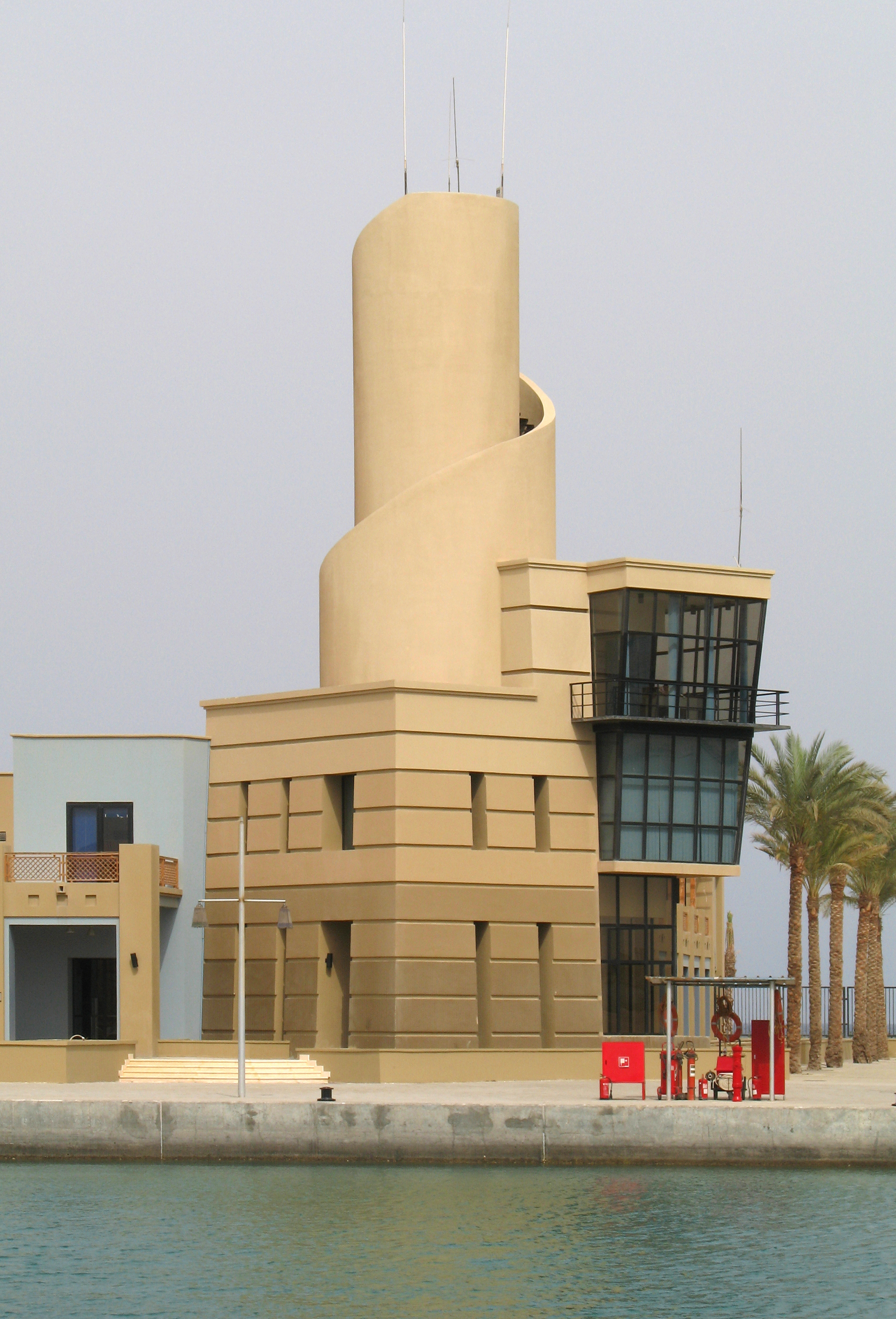
Marina HQ

Marsa Alam Bahri Marina or Port Ghalib Marina is located 65 km north of Marsa Alam City, 75 km south of El Quseir City, and 4 km south of Marsa Alam International Airport. Its total area is 315,872 m^{2}, with a marine area of 277,872 m^{2}. The combined length of its piers is 5,200 meters, and the ground area around the piers is 35,000 m^{2}. The main activity of the marina is to receive foreign and local tourist yachts. It operates 24 hours a day. It is frequented annually by an average of about 2,000 yachts, its capacity is up to 1,050 yachts. The marina was established and managed by the Marsa Alam Tourism Development Company. The marina is equipped with yacht repair facilities, electronic navigation aids, ship waste reception facilities, yacht feeding units with fresh water, electricity and communications, refueling services, security and safety tools, environmental preservation, and fire and pollution control. It has a main navigational approach shaft, illuminated electronically at night, deep in the sea, 60 meters from the beginning of the navigational channel, to guide yachts in their approach to the navigational channel.

== See also ==
- Red Sea Riviera
- El Gouna
- Sahl Hasheesh
- List of cities and towns in Egypt
