= Cairo International Airport =

International airport in Egypt

Cairo International Airport مطار القاهرة الدولي

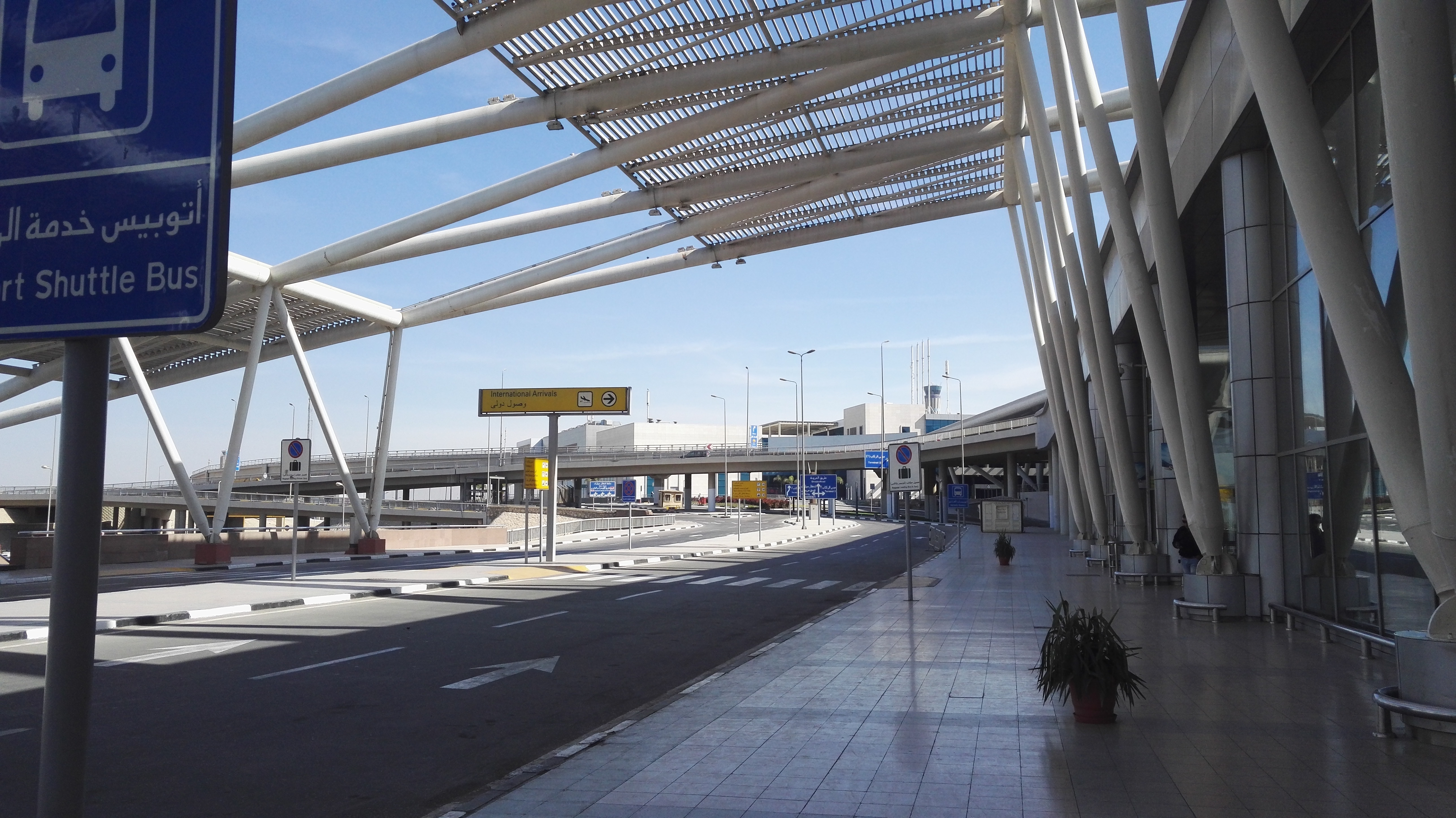
- Cairo International Airport in 2016
- IATA: CAI; ICAO: HECA

Summary
- Airport type: Public
- Owner: Egyptian Holding Company for Airports and Air Navigation
- Operator: Cairo Airport Company
- Serves: Greater Cairo
- Location: Heliopolis, Cairo
- Opened: 1963
- Hub for: EgyptAir; Nile Air; Air Cairo; Air Arabia Egypt
- Elevation AMSL: 382 ft (116 m)
- Coordinates: 30°07′19″N 31°24′20″E
- Website: cairo-airport.com

Maps
- Location within Egypt
- Interactive map of Cairo International Airport

Runways
Direction	Length		Surface
Direction	m	ft	Surface
05L/23R	3,300	10,827	Asphalt
05C/23C	4,000	13,123	Asphalt
05R/23L	4,000	13,123	Asphalt

Statistics (2025)
- Passengers: 30,944,269
- Economic impact (2024): $2.0 billion
- Social impact (2024): 211.5 thousand
- Sources: Airport website and DAFIF; Passenger statistics

Cairo International Airport (IATA: CAI, ICAO: HECA) (Arabic: مطار القاهرة الدولي; Maṭār El Qāhira El Dawli) is the main international airport serving Cairo and its metropolitan area. It is the largest and busiest airport in Egypt. The airport serves as the primary hub for EgyptAir and Nile Air as well as several other airlines. The airport is located in Heliopolis, to the northeast of Cairo around fifteen kilometres (eight nautical miles) from the business area of the city and has an area of approximately 37 km^{2} (14 sq mi). It is the busiest airport in Africa and the 9th busiest airport in the Middle East in terms of total passengers.

== History ==
During World War II, the United States Army Air Forces (USAAF) built John Payne Field Air Force Base to serve the Allied Forces, rather than take over the existing Almaza Airport located 5 kilometres (3.1 mi) away. Payne Field was a major Air Transport Command air cargo and passenger hub, connecting westwards through Benghazi Airport (during the war known as Soluch Airfield) to Algiers airport on the North African route to Dakar Airport, in French West Africa.

Other locations that transport routes were flown were RAF Habbaniya, Iraq on the Cairo – Karachi, India route; Lydda Airport, British Palestine; Jeddah, Arabia, on the Central African route to Roberts Field, Liberia (1941–1943), and later, after the war ended, Athens, Greece and on to destinations in Europe.

When American forces left the base at the end of the war, the Civil Aviation Authority took over the facility and began using it for international civil aviation. In 1963, Cairo International Airport replaced the old Heliopolis Airport, which had been located at the Hike-Step area in the east of Cairo.

The airport is administered by the Egyptian Holding Company for Airports and Air Navigation, which controls the Cairo Airport Company, the Egyptian Airports Company, National Air Navigation Services and Aviation Information Technology, and the Cairo Airport Authority. In 2004, Fraport AG won the management contract to run the airport for eight years, with options to extend the contract twice in one-year increments.

== Terminals ==
=== Terminal 1 ===
Terminal 1 is the oldest terminal currently in operation, having been inaugurated on 18 March 1963 by President Gamal Abdel Nasser. Over the years, the terminal witnessed several expansion projects; a second hall was constructed between 1977–79 and a third one was completed in 1980. In the early 2000s, work commenced on the renovation of the ground floor, along with the addition of an expanded departure hall containing a mezzanine floor, thereby allowing more natural light into the terminal. All phases of the project were completed by the end of 2003.

=== Terminal 2 ===
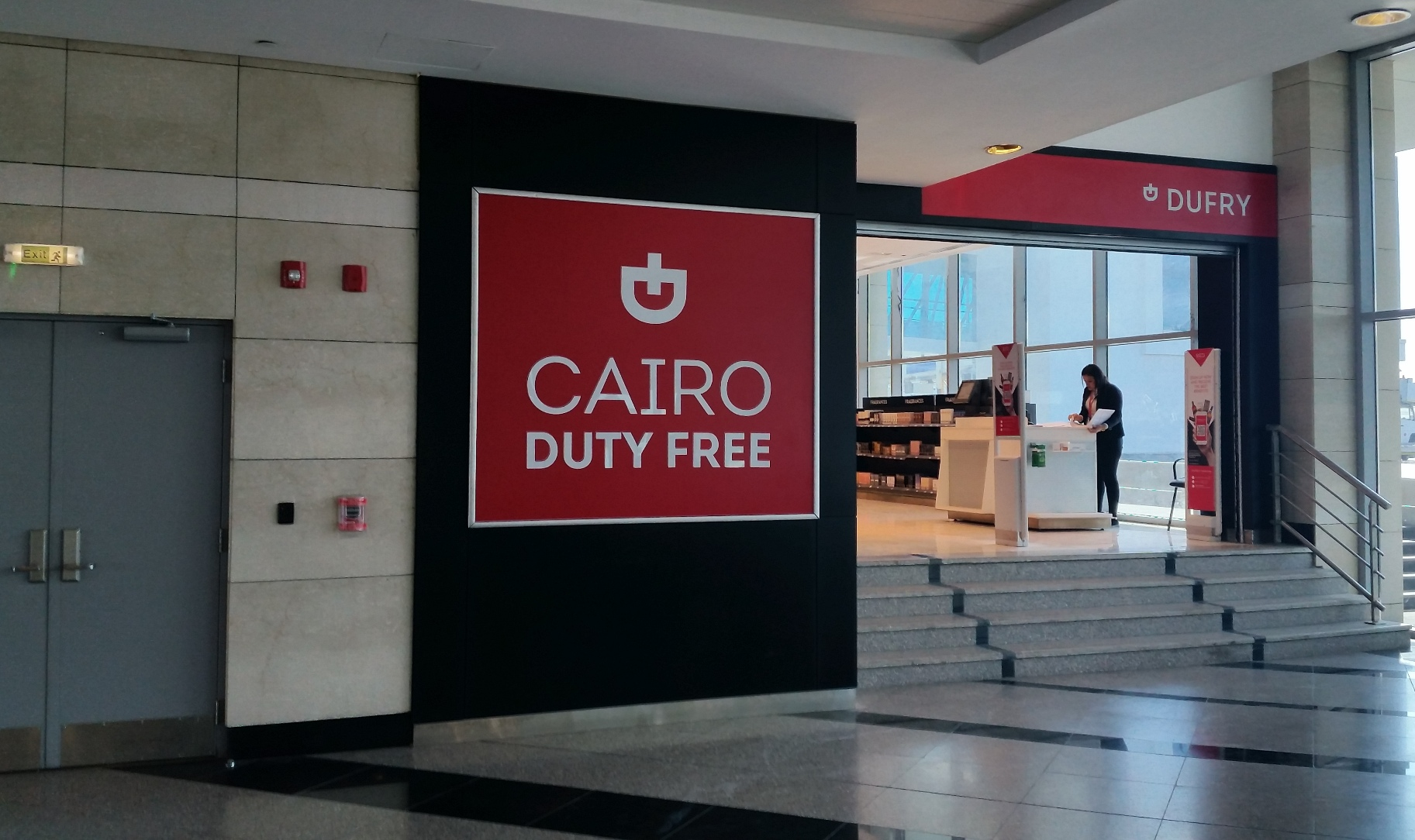
Cairo Duty-Free at Cairo Airport Terminal 2

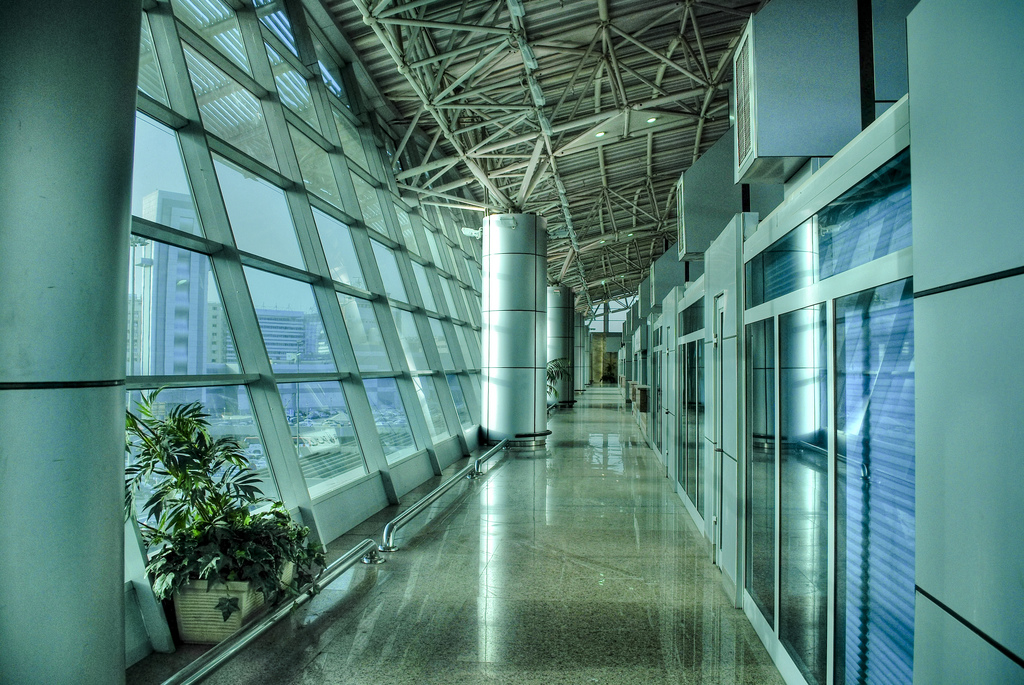
Terminal 1 interior

Terminal 2 was originally inaugurated in 1986 with a relatively compact design that included seven boarding gates and limited expansion capability. As passenger traffic increased, the terminal's layout became a constraint on capacity and operational efficiency, contributing to the need for a comprehensive redevelopment programme.

In response to rising demand, the World Bank approved a US$280 million loan in 2010 to support the Cairo Airport Development Project, which included the rehabilitation and expansion of Terminal 2. The project involved demolishing and reconstructing significant portions of the existing terminal to modernise infrastructure and increase passenger handling capacity.

Major construction works began in 2012, focusing on the development of new terminal buildings, departure and arrival halls, and an expanded airside pier, alongside upgrades to baggage handling systems and landside and airside infrastructure.

The project reached provisional completion in July 2016, and the terminal was reopened in phases beginning in late September of that year.

Following redevelopment, Terminal 2's capacity increased significantly, with the number of gates rising from seven to fourteen and infrastructure upgraded to accommodate wide-body aircraft, including the Airbus A380.

The upgraded terminal includes modern check-in areas, baggage handling systems, expanded retail and passenger facilities, and improved landside and airside connectivity, and operates in conjunction with Terminal 3 as part of an integrated terminal complex.

=== Terminal 3 ===
Given projected passenger growth and limited expansion capacity at Terminal 2, the Egyptian Ministry of Civil Aviation initiated construction of Terminal 3 in 2004. The terminal was inaugurated on 18 December 2008 and opened for commercial operations on 27 April 2009.

Terminal 3 was constructed adjacent to Terminal 2 and connected via a linking bridge, forming part of a wider expansion programme to increase the airport's overall capacity. Upon completion of its first phase, the terminal was designed to handle approximately 11 million passengers annually.

Following its opening, EgyptAir transferred its domestic and international operations to Terminal 3 as part of a restructuring of its Cairo hub. In line with the Star Alliance "Move Under One Roof" strategy, member airlines serving Cairo were subsequently consolidated into the terminal.

Terminal 3 serves as the primary hub for EgyptAir and its alliance partners and is the largest terminal at Cairo International Airport. The facility includes multiple concourses and piers serving both domestic and international traffic, with contact and remote stands, and infrastructure capable of handling large aircraft such as the Airbus A380.

Additional facilities include check-in areas, baggage handling systems, retail space, food and beverage outlets, and upgraded landside infrastructure, including access roads and parking facilities.

=== Seasonal flight terminal ===
The terminal has an annual capacity of 3.2 million passengers with 27 check-in counters and 7 gates with a common gate and single security concept, the first in Cairo. It is designed to handle 1,200 passengers per hour. Passengers will be bussed to remote aircraft stands around Terminal 3. Its purpose is to ease operational strains on the existing terminals during pilgrim seasons.

== Future developments ==
=== Proposed Terminal 4 ===
Plans for a fourth passenger terminal at Cairo International Airport have emerged as part of a broader strategy by the Egyptian Ministry of Civil Aviation to expand capacity and strengthen the airport's role as a regional aviation hub. The project has been described by government officials as a major national infrastructure initiative aimed at accommodating rising passenger demand and enhancing operational efficiency.

Initial planning and feasibility work for the terminal dates back to at least 2023, when the Cairo Airport Company signed memoranda of understanding with international partners to explore the design and development of a new "smart" terminal incorporating advanced technologies and modern operational systems.

By 2025, the project had entered initial implementation phases, with officials describing Terminal 4 as a key component of Egypt's long-term aviation development programme and a step toward transforming Cairo into a global transit hub. Government statements emphasised the integration of digital systems, including automated passenger processing and smart airport technologies, as part of wider efforts to modernise airport infrastructure.

The proposed terminal is expected to substantially increase the airport's passenger capacity. Official estimates indicate that Terminal 4 could accommodate at least 30 million passengers annually, potentially raising the airport's total capacity to more than 60 million passengers per year once completed. The project has been reported to carry an estimated cost of between US$3.5 billion and US$4.5 billion.

Construction of Terminal 4 is expected to take approximately four years once fully underway, with early reports suggesting a potential opening as early as 2030. As of 2026, the project remains in the planning and early development stages, with ongoing discussions regarding financing, design, and potential private-sector participation in management and operations.

== Facilities ==
=== Overview ===
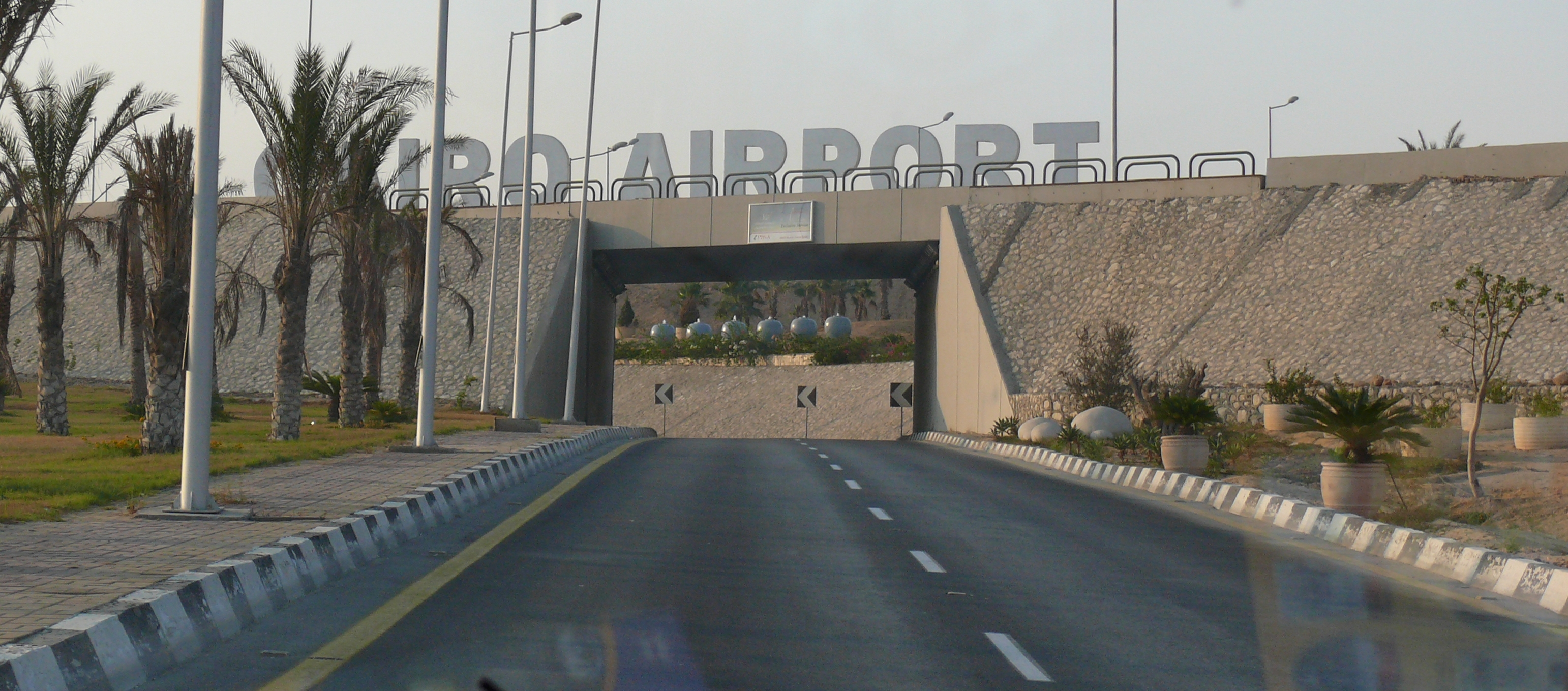
Airport entrance

The airport has four terminals, the third (and largest) opened on 27 April 2009 and the Seasonal Flights Terminal opened on 20 September 2011. Terminal 2 was closed in April 2010 for major renovation works and was reopened on 28 September 2016. A third parallel runway replaced the crossing runway in 2010. Runway 05L/23R is 3,301 metres (10,830 ft) long, 05C/23C has a length of 4,000 metres (13,000 ft), and the new runway is designated as 05R/23L and is 3,999 metres (13,120 ft) long.

==== Terminal transfer ====
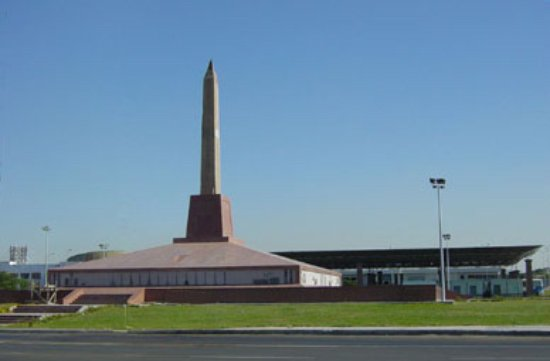
Obelisk of Ramses II at Cairo International Airport

==== Airport hotel ====
A luxury 350-room five-star Le Méridien hotel opened in front of Terminal 3 in December 2013. The hotel is linked to the terminal by a 230-metre-long (750 ft) skyway that is also equipped with a moving walkway.

== Statistics ==
The sharp decline in 2020 was caused by the COVID-19 pandemic worldwide and in Egypt.

The latest statistics show 30.94 million passengers in 2025.

== Airlines and destinations ==
=== Passenger ===
Airlines	Destinations
Aegean Airlines	Athens, Thessaloniki
Aeroflot	Moscow–Sheremetyevo
Air Algérie	Algiers
Air Arabia	Abha, Abu Dhabi, Dammam, Gassim, Ha'il, Istanbul–Sabiha Gökçen, Jeddah, Jizan, Kuwait City, Milan-Bergamo, Muscat, Ras Al Khaimah, Riyadh, Sharjah, Tabuk, Ta'if
Air Cairo	Abha, Abu Simbel, Al Jawf, Amman–Queen Alia, Aswan, Athens, Bologna, Brussels (begins 18 December 2026), Catania, Cologne/Bonn, Gassim, Hurghada, Istanbul, Jeddah, Kuwait City, Luxor, Málaga, Marsa Alam, Milan–Malpensa, Riyadh, Rome–Fiumicino, Sharm El Sheikh, Sohag, Tabuk, Ta'if, Tangier, Tripoli-Mitiga, Yerevan; Seasonal: Antalya, Verona
Air China	Beijing–Capital
Air France	Paris Charles de Gaulle
Air Montenegro	Seasonal charter: Podgorica
AJet	Ankara, Istanbul–Sabiha Gökçen
Alexandria Airlines	Jeddah
AlMasria Universal Airlines	Kuwait City
Austrian Airlines	Vienna
Azerbaijan Airlines	Seasonal charter: Baku
Berniq Airways	Benghazi, Misrata, Tripoli-Mitiga
British Airways	London-Heathrow
Brussels Airlines	Brussels (begins 29 March 2027)
Condor	Frankfurt
China Eastern Airlines	Shanghai–Pudong
Egyptair	Abidjan, Abu Dhabi, Abuja, Accra, Addis Ababa, Aleppo (resumes 6 December 2026), Algiers, Amman–Queen Alia, Amsterdam, Asmara, Aswan, Athens, Baghdad, Bahrain, Barcelona, Beijing–Capital, Beirut, Berlin, Benghazi, Birmingham, Brussels, Budapest, Casablanca, Chicago–O'Hare, Copenhagen, Damascus (resumes 4 December 2026), Dammam, Dar es Salaam, Delhi, Dhaka, Djibouti, Doha, Douala, Dubai–International, Dublin, Düsseldorf, El Kharga, Entebbe, Erbil, Frankfurt, Gassim, Geneva, Hangzhou, Hurghada, Istanbul, Jakarta–Soekarno-Hatta, Jeddah, Johannesburg–O.R. Tambo, Juba, Kano, Kigali, Kinshasa–N'djili, Kuwait City, Lagos, Larnaca, London–Heathrow, Los Angeles, Luxor, Madrid, Manchester, Marsa Alam, Medina, Milan–Malpensa, Misrata, Mogadishu, Moscow–Domodedovo, Mumbai, Munich, Muscat, Nairobi–Jomo Kenyatta, N'Djamena, New York-JFK, Newark, Paris–Charles de Gaulle, Port Sudan, Prague, Riyadh, Rome–Fiumicino, Shanghai–Pudong, Sharjah, Sharm El Sheikh, Stockholm–Arlanda (resumes 18 December 2026), Tabuk, Taif, Tokyo–Narita, Toronto–Pearson, Tripoli–Mitiga, Tunis, Venice, Vienna, Washington–Dulles, Zanzibar, Zürich
Emirates	Dubai–International
Ethiopian Airlines	Addis Ababa
Etihad Airways	Abu Dhabi
Eurowings	Düsseldorf
Flyadeal	Dammam, Jeddah, Riyadh; Seasonal: Abha
FlyAden	Aden
Fly Baghdad	Najaf
Flynas	Dammam, Jeddah, Medina, Riyadh
Gulf Air	Bahrain
Hainan Airlines	Shenzhen
Iberia Express	Madrid
ITA Airways	Rome–Fiumicino
Iraqi Airways	Baghdad, Basra, Erbil
Jazeera Airways	Kuwait City
Jordan Aviation	Amman–Queen Alia
Kuwait Airways	Kuwait City
Libyan Airlines	Tripoli–Mitiga
LOT Polish Airlines	Warsaw–Chopin
Lufthansa	Frankfurt
Middle East Airlines	Beirut
Neos	Milan–Malpensa
Nesma Airlines	Al Jawf, Dammam, Kuwait City, Milan–Malpensa
Nile Air	Abha, Al Ain, Al Jawf, Aswan, Bergamo, Cologne/Bonn, Dammam, Gassim, Ha'il, Hurghada, Istanbul–Sabiha Gökçen, Jeddah, Kuwait City, Luxor, Najran, Neom Bay, Sharjah, Sharm El Sheikh, Stockholm–Arlanda, Tabuk, Ta'if
Qatar Airways	Doha
Riyadh Air	Riyadh
Rossiya Airlines	Sochi
Royal Air Maroc	Casablanca
Royal Jordanian	Amman–Queen Alia, Aqaba
Saudia	Jeddah, Medina, Riyadh
SCAT Airlines	Şymkent
Sichuan Airlines	Beijing–Capital, Chengdu–Tianfu
Sky Express	Athens (begins 2 December 2026)
Sudan Airways	Khartoum, Port Sudan
Smartwings	Seasonal charter: Prague
SunExpress	Seasonal: Antalya
Swiss International Air Lines	Zürich
Tarco Aviation	Port Sudan
TAROM	Bucharest–Otopeni
Transavia	Amsterdam, Lyon, Marseille, Paris–Orly
Tunisair	Tunis
Turkish Airlines	Istanbul
Vueling	Barcelona, Paris–Orly
Yemenia	Mukhalla

=== Cargo ===
Airlines	Destinations
Cargolux	Beirut, Luxembourg
DHL Aviation	Bahrain
Egyptair Cargo	Accra, Amman–Queen Alia, Brussels, Cardiff, Cologne/Bonn, Dammam, Dubai–Al Maktoum, Istanbul, Johannesburg–O. R. Tambo, Kano, Kuwait, Lagos, Lahore, Mauritius, Milan–Malpensa, Mumbai, N'Djamena, Ostend/Bruges, Riyadh, Sharjah
Emirates SkyCargo	Dubai–Al Maktoum
Ethiopian Airlines Cargo	Addis Ababa, Beirut, Liège
Lufthansa Cargo	Frankfurt
KLM Cargo	Amsterdam
Royal Jordanian Cargo	Amman–Queen Alia
Turkish Cargo	Istanbul

== Ground transport ==
=== Limousines and shuttle buses ===
There are several ways to leave Cairo airport upon arrival. The most convenient way is by one of the numerous "limousine services". Pick-up points are in front of the terminals (curb side). The prices are fixed depending on the destination and the car category, but different providers may charge wildly different prices. Category A are luxury limousines (e.g. Mercedes-Benz E-Class), Category B are micro buses for up to seven passengers, Category C are midsized cars (e.g. Mitsubishi Lancer) and new Category D are London Taxis.

=== Public transport ===
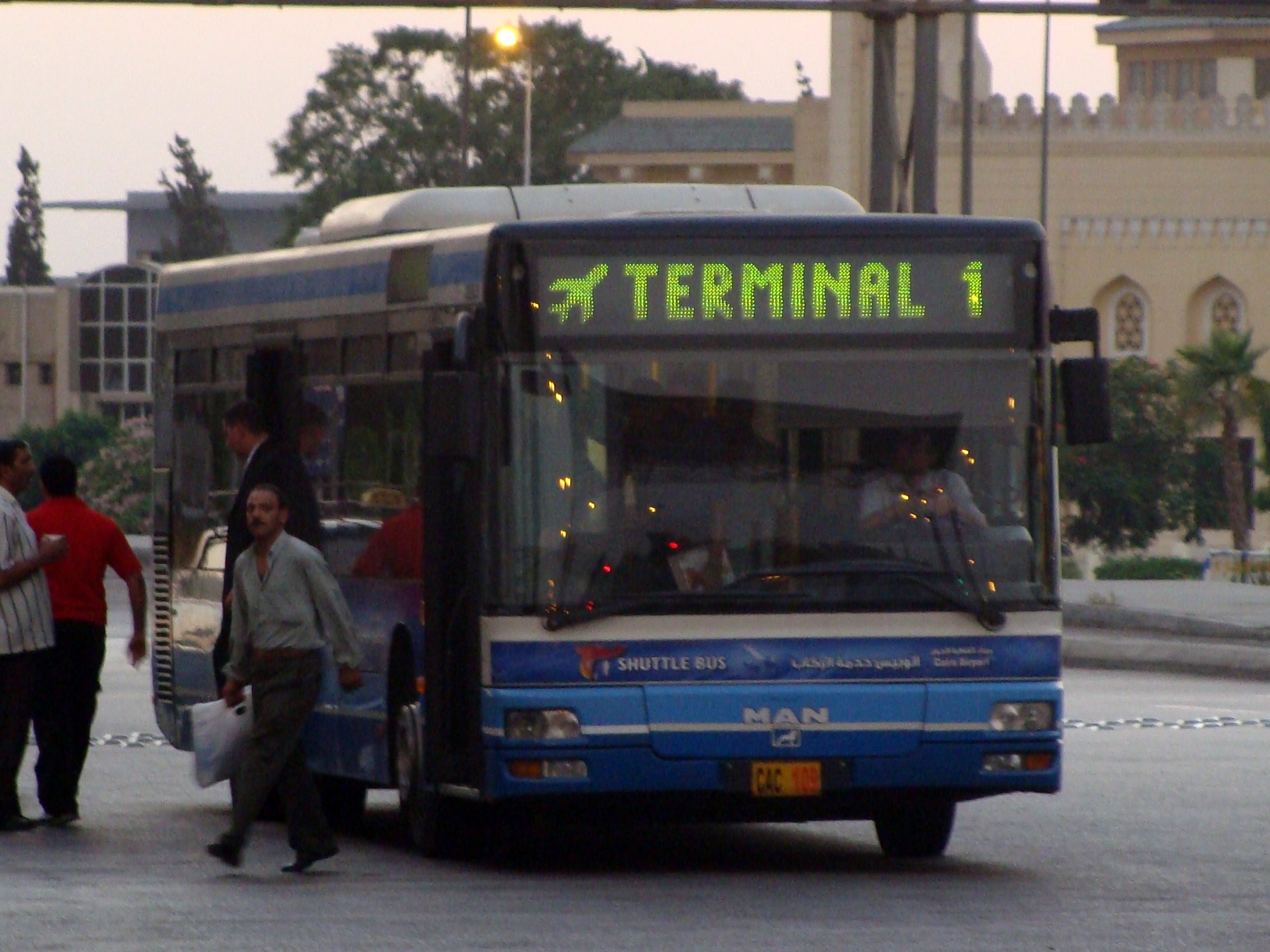
Internal Cairo Airport Shuttle – shuffling passengers between Terminals 1, 2, 3 and the Cairo Airport Bus Terminal

A shuttle bus connects with all the passenger terminals and finally stops at the Cairo Airport Bus Terminal where public buses heading to other destinations in Cairo and connect frequently to major transportation hubs like Abbasia and Tahrir Square/Abdel-Moniem Riad bus terminus.

However, there were efforts by Transport for Cairo (TFC) to map the major bus routes and metro lines in Cairo. Having this map in hand is useful.

Also, scheduling and route information of both the public Cairo Transportation Authority (CTA) and Mwasalat Mirs (MM) buses are now readily available on Google Transit and can be accessed using the Google Maps app and website.

=== Taxi ===
With the exception of the so-called (and increasingly scarce) "Black and White" cabs, all regular Cairo taxis (colloquially known as the White taxi) are equipped with digital taxi meters. Taxi drivers in Cairo are legally required to switch on their taxi meters the moment they pick up a new client (See video on Mada Masr). However, some taxi drivers will try to manipulate how the meter counts the distance driven (by electronically tampering with their meters).

=== Ride sharing ===
Ride-sharing services, such as Uber, are available in Cairo and provide an option for private transportation.

=== Car ===
The airport can be reached via Oroba Road from Heliopolis or via the new road, connecting Terminal 3 with the Cairo Ring Road and Suez Road interchange. The toll for driving into the airport grounds is approximately 30 EGP, depending on the type of the vehicle.

Note: Cairo-Suez road is part of the Arab Mashreq International Road Network, designated as the Motorway 50/M50. It connects Cairo to Suez, South Sinai through the Ahmed Hamdi Tunnel under the Suez Canal, then to Israel via the Taba Border Crossing, Jordan via the Wadi Araba Crossing, to Saudi Arabia via Durra Border Crossing, and then finally into Iraq via the Arar border crossing where the road ends in the capital, Baghdad.

== Accidents and incidents ==
- On 20 February 1956, a Transports Aériens Intercontinentaux Douglas DC-6B on a scheduled Saigon-Karachi-Cairo-Paris flight crashed on approach to Cairo airport, killing 52 of the 63 people on board.
- On 12 June 1961, KLM Flight 823, a Lockheed L-188 Electra crashed 4 km (2.5 mi) SE of Cairo Airport because of the pilot-in-command's inattention to his instruments. Three crew and 17 passengers were killed out of the 36 passengers and crew on board.
- On 15 May 1962, a United Arab Airlines Douglas DC-3 crashed shortly after takeoff for a cargo flight to Beirut. All three occupants died.
- On 19 March 1965, Vickers Viscount YI-ACU of Iraqi Airways was damaged beyond economic repair when it ran into a number of lamp standards after a hydraulic system failure.
- On 15 January 1968, Douglas DC-3 SU-AJG of United Arab Airlines departed on an international scheduled cargo flight to Beirut when the crew decided to return due to icing. The aircraft subsequently broke up in mid-air and crashed at Zefta, killing all four people on board. The cargo shifting in flight and the aircraft being 500 kilograms (1,100 lb) overloaded may have contributed to the accident.
- On 10 June 1986, an Air Sinai Fokker F-27 Friendship upon returning to Cairo crashed short of the runway while approaching in a sandstorm, colliding with the side of a building and catching fire. All five crew and 18 passengers of the 26 on board were killed.
- On 31 March 1988, an Arax Airlines Douglas DC-8 crashed on its second takeoff attempt at the runway end because of an engine fire. All four occupants died.
- On 29 July 2011, EgyptAir Flight 667 caught fire while parked at the terminal just before its scheduled flight to Saudi Arabia. Everyone on board was able to quickly evacuate the aircraft.

== See also ==
- Sphinx International Airport
- List of airports in Egypt
- List of the busiest airports in the Middle East
- List of airports with triple takeoff/landing capability
