= Transport in Egypt =

Ministry of Transportation in Arab Republic of Egypt

Transport in Egypt is centered in Cairo and largely follows the pattern of settlement along the Nile. The Ministry of Transportation and other government bodies are responsible for transportation in Egypt, whether by sea, river, land or air.

With regard to rail, air and waterway travel, the main line of the nation's rail system follows along the Nile river and is operated by Egyptian National Railways. In addition to overseas routes, Egypt Air provides domestic air service to major tourist destinations from its Cairo hub. The Nile River system (about 1,600 km (990 mi)) and the principal canals (1,600 km (990 mi)) are important locally for transportation. People still travel via the Nile, mainly between Cairo and Aswan. The Suez Canal is a major waterway for international commerce and navigation, linking the Mediterranean and Red Sea. Major ports are Alexandria, Port Said, Damietta on the Mediterranean and Suez and Safaga on the Red Sea.

== Road system ==
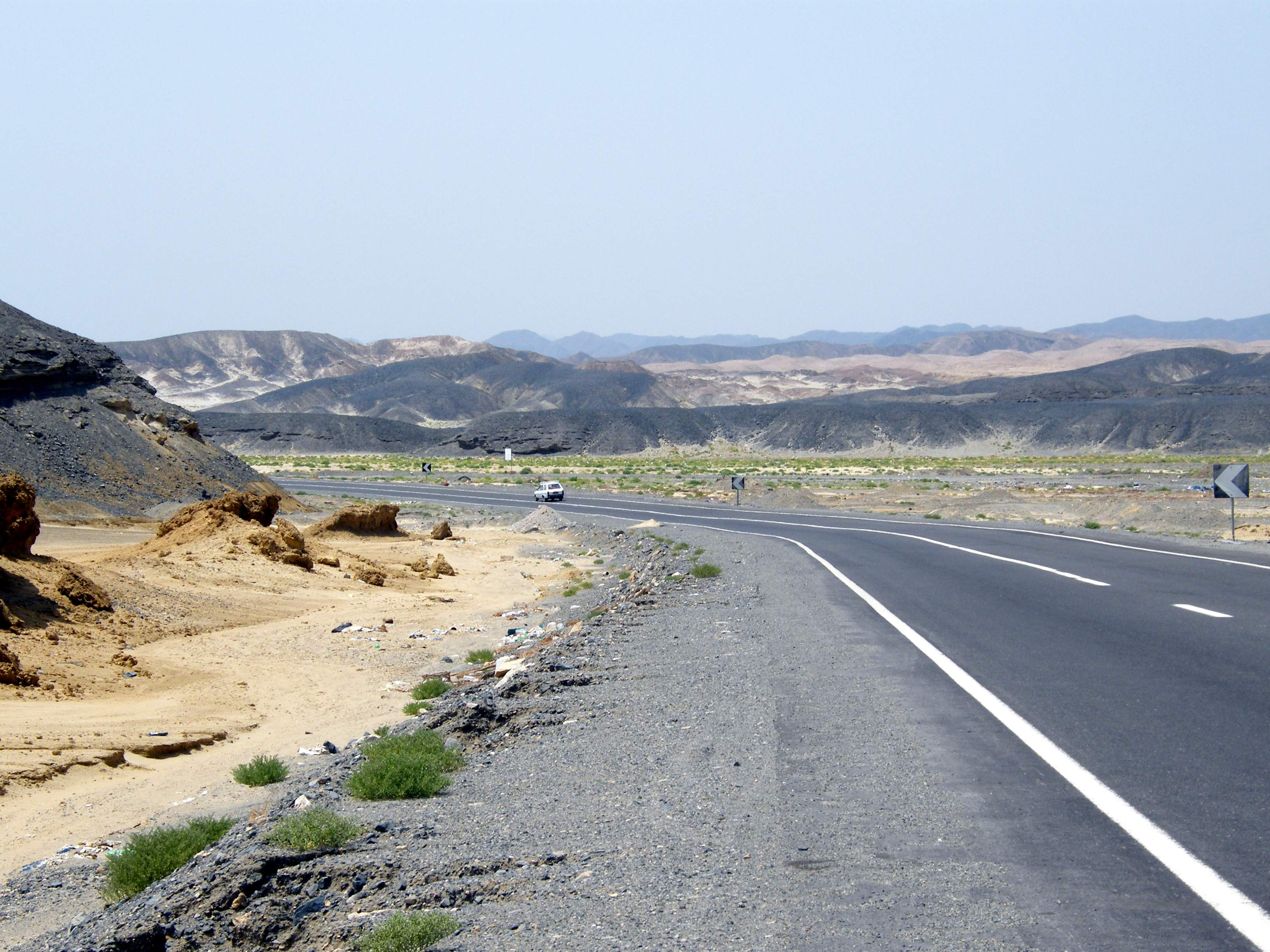
Road in Marsa Alam.

Egypt has significantly expanded and modernized its road network, primarily through the National Roads Project, which aims to construct 7,000 km of new roads. By 2024, 6,300 km had been completed at a cost of 155 billion Egyptian pounds, increasing the total length of main roads by 29.8% to 30,500 km, compared to 23,500 km in 2014. Additionally, 8,400 km of roads have been upgraded at a cost of 110 billion Egyptian pounds, out of a 10,000 km target. These improvements have enhanced Egypt’s Road Quality Index, which rose from 2.9 points (118th place) in 2015 to 5.53 points (18th place) in 2024.

Egypt is integrated into regional road networks, with two routes in the Trans-African Highway network originating in Cairo and multiple highway links connecting to Asia through the Arab Mashreq International Road Network. While national highways remain the primary mode of transport, the country has developed an extensive system of 4-lane highways that function as freeways, though they accommodate mixed traffic, making them slower than dedicated motorways.

Despite infrastructure improvements, traffic regulations are poorly enforced and frequently disregarded, resulting in one of the highest rates of road fatalities worldwide per miles driven.

Some of the country's major motorways include:

- Cairo - Alexandria Desert Road: It runs between Cairo and Alexandria, with an extension of 215 km (134 mi), it is the main motorway in Egypt.
- International Coastal Road: It runs from Alexandria to Port Said, along the Northern Nile Delta. It has a length of 280 km (170 mi). Also, amongst other cities, it connects Damietta and Baltim.
- Geish Road: It runs between Helwan and Asyut, along the Nile River, also connecting Beni Suef and Minya. Its length is 306 km (190 mi).
- Ring Road: It serves as an inner ring-road for Cairo. It has a length of 103 km (64 mi).
- Regional Ring Road: It serves as an outer ring road for Cairo, also connecting its suburbs like Helwan and 10th of Ramadan City. Its length is 130 km (81 mi).

== Railways ==
Egypt railway network 1,435 mm (4 ft 8 1/2 in) standard gauge

Egypt's railway system is the oldest in Africa and the Middle East, with its first line between Alexandria and Kafr Eissa opening in 1854. As of 2018, the network spans approximately 5,085 km (3,160 mi) and is operated by Egyptian National Railways, carrying around 800 million passengers and 12 million tonnes of freight annually. A modernization program was initiated in 2007 to enhance safety and infrastructure.

In 2021, Egypt signed a $4.5 billion contract with Siemens Mobility, Orascom Construction, and Arab Contractors to construct and maintain a 660 km (410 mi) high-speed electrified railway connecting Ain Sokhna, Mersa Matruh, and Alexandria. Known as the "Green Line" or "Suez Canal on Rails," it is designed for both passenger and freight transport. Siemens will supply Velaro high-speed trains, Desiro regional sets, and Vectron freight locomotives. In 2022, the project expanded to include two additional lines linking Greater Cairo to Aswan, and Luxor to Hurghada and Safaga.

The Cairo Metro currently operates three lines, with a fourth under construction and further expansions planned. Additionally, an Alexandria Metro system is under development to improve urban transportation.

== Waterways ==
Egypt has 3,500 km (2,200 mi) of navigable waterways, including the Nile, Lake Nasser, the Mahmudiyya Canal connecting Alexandria with the Nile, as well as numerous smaller canals in the Nile Delta. The Suez Canal, spanning 193.5 km (120.2 mi), serves as a major maritime route, accommodating oceangoing vessels with a maximum draft of 17.68 meters (as of 2011).

=== Nile River ===
The Nile River system (about 1,600 km (990 mi)) and the principal canals (1,600 km) are used for local transportation. Motorboats, ferries and feluccas are common means of transport along the Nile.

=== Suez Canal ===
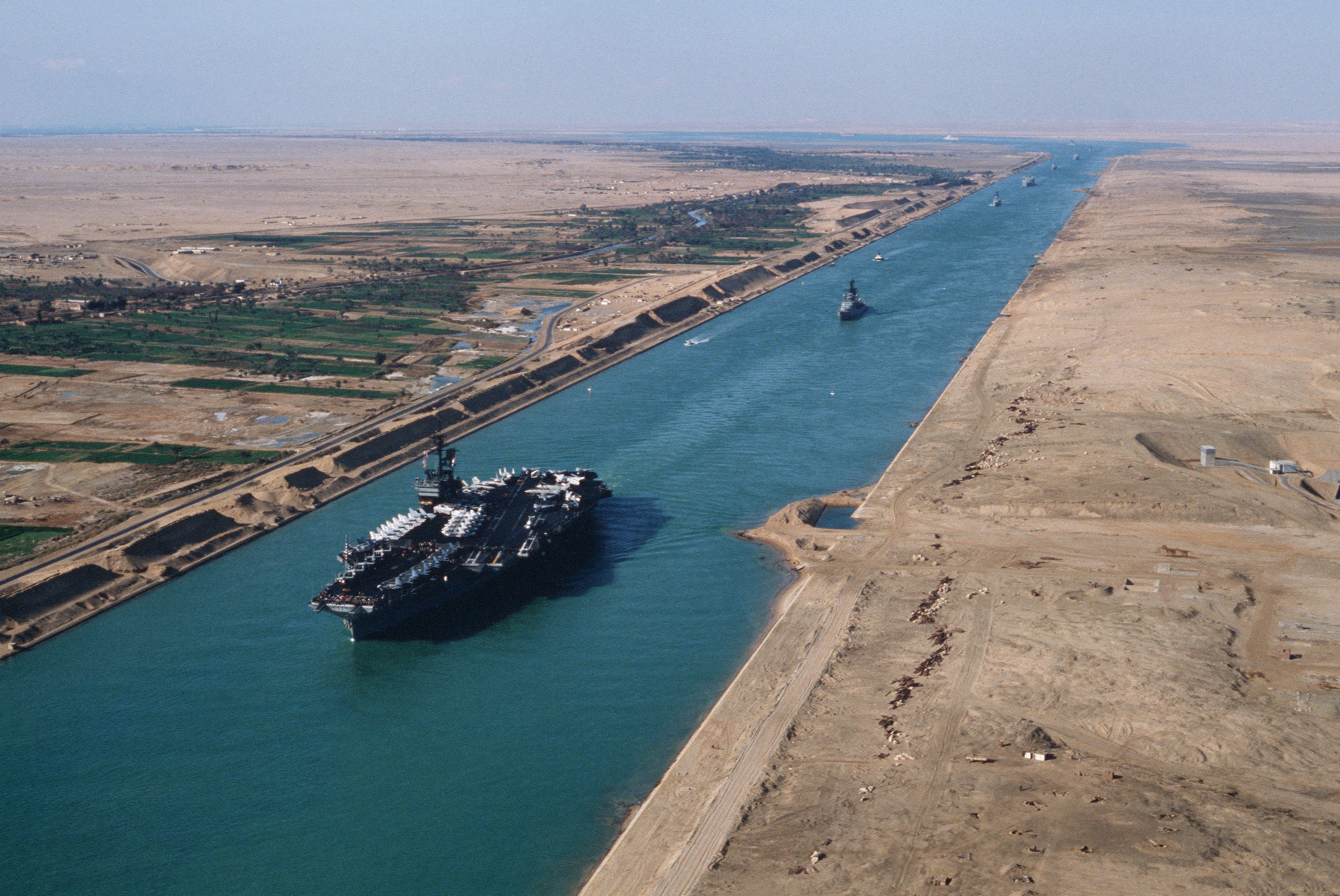
The Suez Canal

The Suez Canal is a critical maritime corridor connecting the Mediterranean Sea to the Red Sea, facilitating global trade since its completion in 1869. Built under the direction of Ferdinand de Lesseps, it established a direct shipping route between Europe and Asia, significantly reducing travel distances by eliminating the need for passage around the Cape of Good Hope. The canal has undergone multiple expansions to meet the growing demands of international shipping. In 2021, over 20,600 vessels transited the canal, averaging 56 ships per day.

To enhance capacity, the Egyptian government initiated an expansion project in 2014, widening key sections and increasing the daily transit capacity from 49 to 97 ships. The New Suez Canal, inaugurated in 2015, introduced a parallel lane and deepened sections of the original canal, reducing transit times from 18 to 11 hours and minimizing delays for vessels.

== Pipelines ==
As of 2018, Egypt's pipeline infrastructure includes 486 km (302 mi) of condensate pipelines, 74 km (46 mi) of condensate/gas pipelines, and an extensive 7,986 km (4,962 mi) network for natural gas. The country also operates 957 km (595 mi) of liquid petroleum gas pipelines, 5,225 km (3,247 mi) for crude oil, and 37 km (23 mi) designated for oil, gas, and water transport. Additionally, Egypt has 895 km (556 mi) of refined product pipelines and 65 km (40 mi) for water distribution.

== Ports ==
Egypt has 15 commercial ports and 29 specialized ports. The specialized ports include 5 tourist seaports, 12 petroleum seaports, 6 mining seaports, and 6 fishing seaports.

=== Commercial Ports ===
- Ain Sokhna Port
- Alexandria Port
- Dekhela Port
- Damietta Port
- Port Said Port
- East Port Said Port
- Arish Port
- Suez Port
- Petroleum Dock Port
- Adabiya Port
- Sokhna Port
- Nuweiba Port
- El Tor Port
- Sharm El Sheikh Port
- Hurghada Port
- Safaga Port

== Merchant marine ==
In 2018, the number of Egypt's sea vessels, according to the CIA World Factbook is 399 as follows:

- Bulk carrier: 14
- Container ship: 8
- General cargo: 33
- Petroleum tanker: 36
- Other: 308

== Airports ==
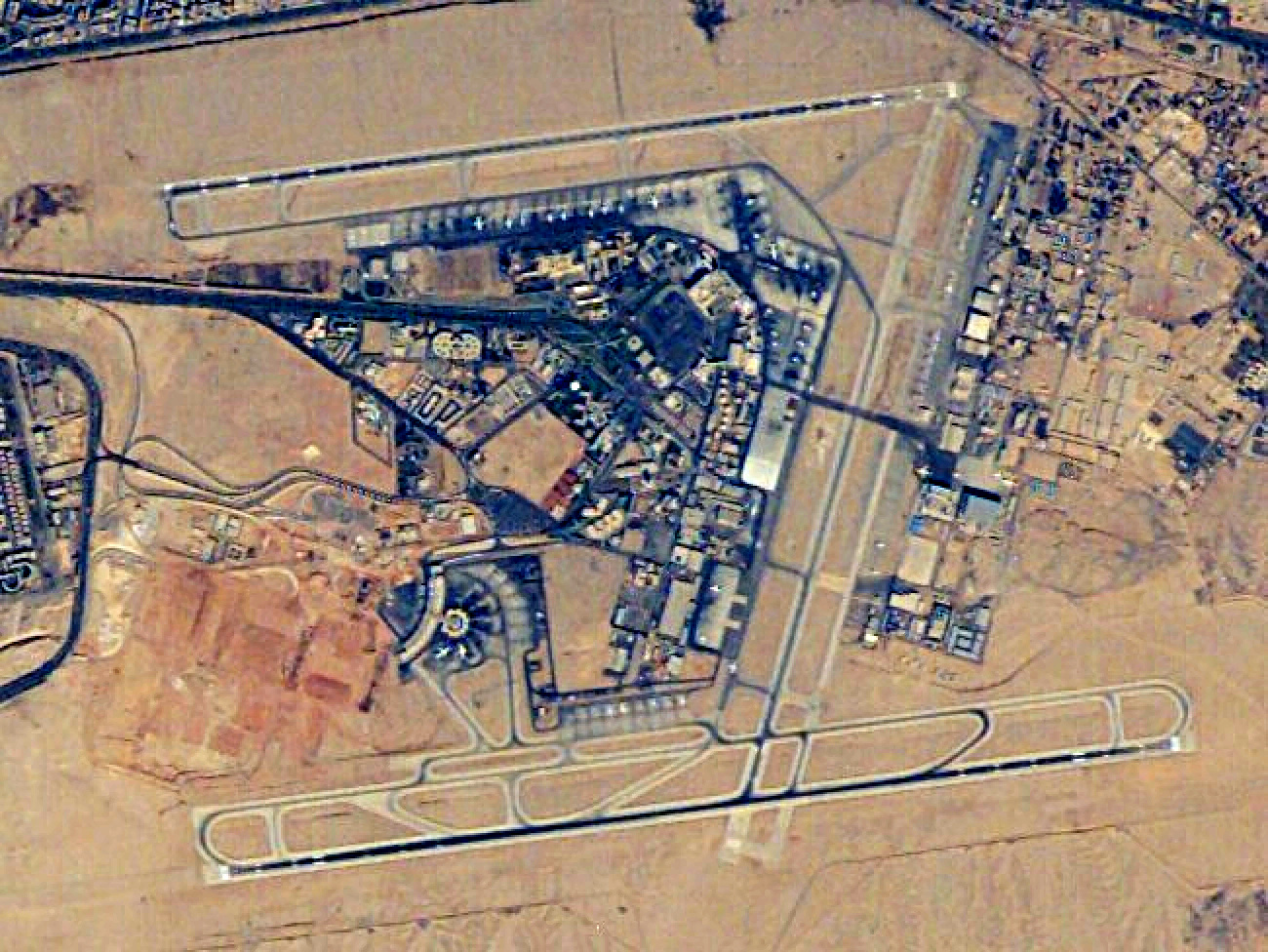
Satellite image of Cairo International Airport

Cairo International Airport is used by numerous international airlines, including the country's own Egypt Air and Nile Air.

=== Airports with paved runways ===
Total: 72

Over 3,047 m: 15

2,438 to 3,047 m: 36

1,524 to 2,437 m: 15

914 to 1,523 m: 0

Under 914 m: 6

=== Airports with unpaved runways ===
Total: 11

2,438 to 3,047 m: 1

1,524 to 2,437 m: 3

914 to 1,523 m: 4

Under 914 m: 3 (2013)

== Heliports ==
- 7 (2013)

== Monorail ==
Egypt is currently constructing a two-line monorail rapid transit system in the Greater Cairo region. Upon completion, it is projected to be the longest driverless monorail system in the world. The system will provide the first public transport link between the New Administrative Capital and 6th of October City with the greater Cairo metropolitan area. The 53 km line connecting the New Administrative Capital to eastern Cairo is expected to have a travel time of approximately 60 minutes, while the 42 km line linking 6th of October City to Giza is expected to take around 42 minutes.

== See also ==
- Transport in Cairo
- Arab Union for Land Transport Company
- List of bus companies in Egypt
- List of lighthouses in Egypt
