= List of airlines of Syria =

This is a list of airlines which have an Air Operator Certificate issued by the General Authority of Civil Aviation of Syria.

== Scheduled airlines ==
Airline	Image	IATA	ICAO	Callsign	Commenced operations	Hub airport(s)	Notes
Syrian Air		RB	SYR	SYRIANAIR	1947	Damascus International Airport	Flag carrier
Fly Cham		XH	FYC	FLYCHAM	2025	Damascus International Airport	

== Charter airlines ==
Airline	Image	IATA	ICAO	Callsign	Commenced operations	Hub airport(s)	Notes

== See also ==
- List of airlines
- List of airports in Syria
- List of defunct airlines of Asia
