= Qamishli International Airport =

Airport in Qamishli, Syria

Qamishli International Airport مطار القامشلي الدولي Balafirgeha Qamişlo ya Navneteweyî
- IATA: KAC; ICAO: OSKL

Summary
- Airport type: Public
- Owner: Government of Syria
- Operator: General Authority of Civil Aviation
- Serves: Qamishli, Syria
- Time zone: AST (UTC+03:00)
- Elevation AMSL: 1,480 ft (450 m)
- Coordinates: 37°01′14″N 041°11′29″E
- Website: qamishliairport.gov.sy

Map
- Location of airport in Syria

Runways
Direction	Length		Surface
Direction	m	ft	Surface
03/21	3,615	11,860	Asphalt
- Source: DAFIF

Qamishli International Airport (IATA: KAC, ICAO: OSKL) (Arabic: مطار القامشلي الدولي, romanized: Maṭār al-Qāmishlī al-Duwalī; Kurmanji Kurdish: Balafirgeha Qamişlo ya Navneteweyî) is an international airport serving Qamishli, a city in northeastern Syria.

== History ==
Although the airport was closed to civilians around October 2015, it had reopened, with Syrian flight companies including Cham Wings Airlines and Syrian Air providing regular flights into Qamishli from Damascus, Latakia and Beirut until November 2024. The airport used to receive seasonal foreign flights from Germany and Sweden.

On 21 January 2016, there were reports that Russia was setting up a new military base in the government-controlled and mainly abandoned airport.

On 7 December 2024, a day prior the fall of the Assad regime, the Syrian Democratic Forces (SDF) took control of the airport following the withdrawal of pro-regime militants. A few days later, Turkey's MIT intelligence service claimed responsibility for an attack on the airport, as they detected that the "YPG seized the military supplies and was taking them to its own warehouses," contradicting a rumour that alleged that Israeli airstrikes had targeted weapons depots left in the facility. Later that month, on 16 December, two Russian Ilyushin military transport planes withdrew from the airport. As of June 2025 the airport serves as a military outpost for the Russian military. In January 2026, Russian troops withdrew from Qamishli during the ceasefire between the Syrian transitional government and the SDF. On 8 February 2026, Syrian officials accompanied by Asayish, stationed at the airport in preparation for reopening civilian flights. The Syrian Civil Aviation Authority announced that it has officially taken over the management of Qamishli Airport on 21 February 2026.

== Facilities ==
The airport resides at an elevation of 1,480 feet (451 m) above mean sea level. It has one runway designated 03/21 with an asphalt surface measuring 3,615 by 46 metres (11,860 ft × 151 ft).
