= Syrian Arab =

Syrian Arab can refer to:

- Syrian Arab Airlines
- Syrian Arabian horse
- Syrian ethnic Arabs, see Demographics_of_Syria#Ethnic_groups
