= Aleppo International Airport =

International airport serving Aleppo, Syria

Aleppo International Airport مطار حلب الدولي
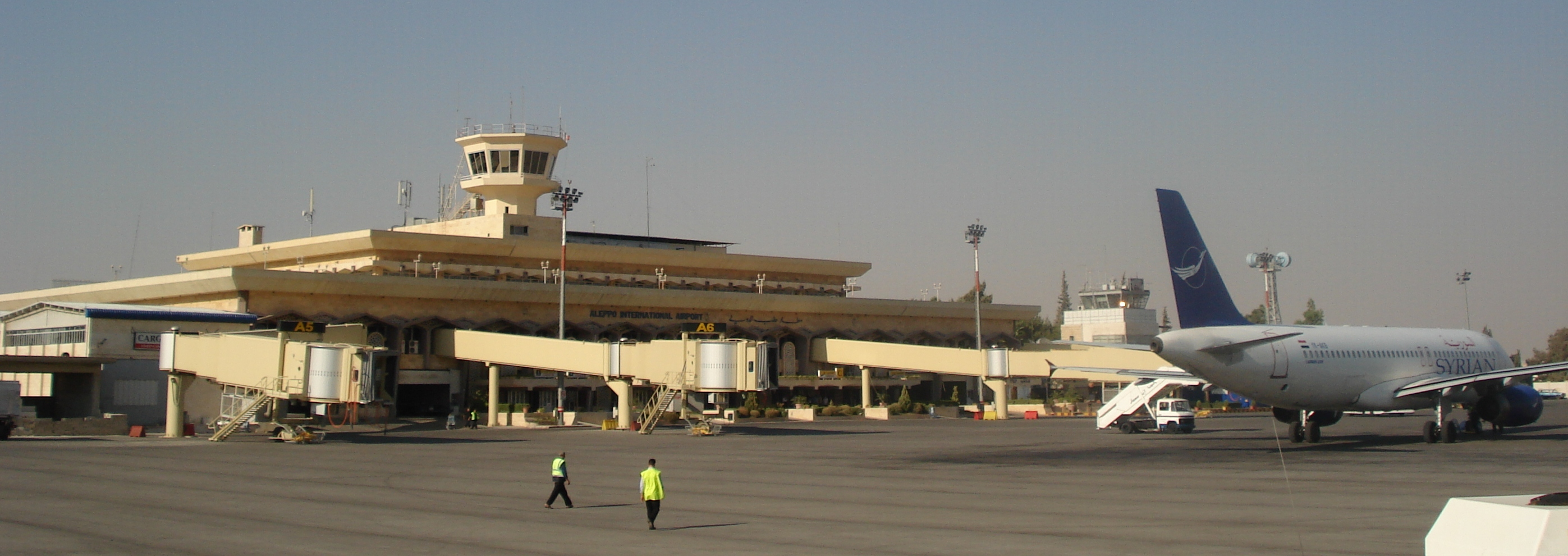
- IATA: ALP; ICAO: OSAP

Summary
- Airport type: Public
- Owner: Government of Syria
- Operator: General Authority of Civil Aviation
- Serves: Aleppo, Syria
- Hub for: Syrian Airlines; Fly Cham
- Time zone: AST (UTC+03:00)
- Elevation AMSL: 1,276 ft (389 m)
- Coordinates: 36°10′50″N 37°13′27″E
- Website: www.alpairport.gov.sy

Map
- Location in Syria ALP/OSAP (Asia)

Runways
Direction	Length		Surface
Direction	m	ft	Surface
09/27	3,110	9,547	Asphalt
- Source: DAFIF

Aleppo International Airport (Arabic: مطار حلب الدولي) (IATA: ALP, ICAO: OSAP) is an international airport serving Aleppo, Syria. The airport serves as a secondary hub for Syrian Airlines.

== History ==
=== Early history ===
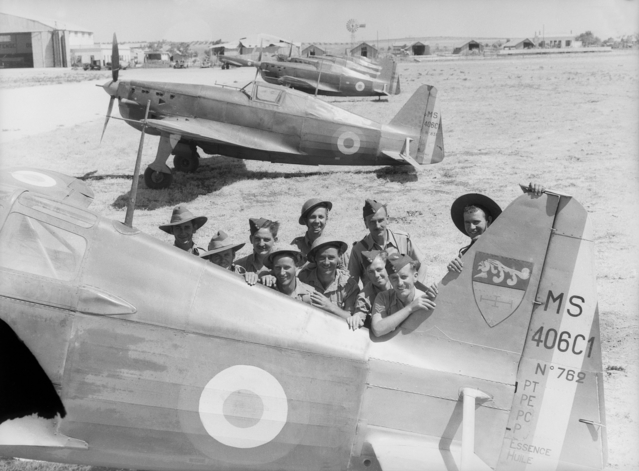
Australian troops posed with captured Vichy French fighters at Aleppo-Nayrab airfield during the Syrian campaign, July 1941

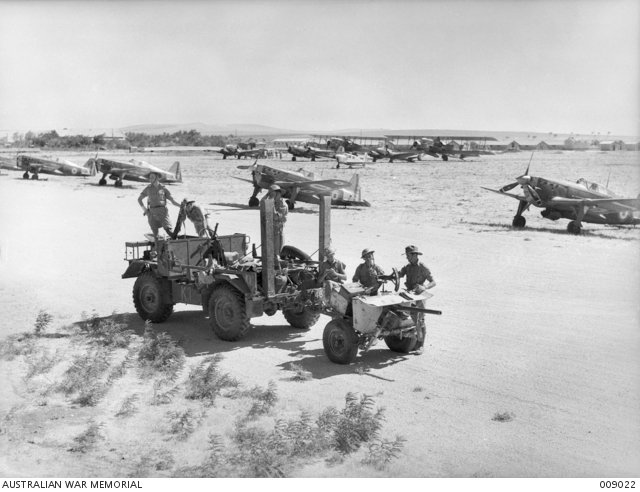
Australian soldiers in front of Morane-Saulnier MS.406s at Aleppo airfield in June 1941

The history of the airport dates back to the beginning of the 20th century during the French Mandate. In 1924, KLM Royal Dutch Airlines made their first flight from Amsterdam to Batavia, Dutch East Indies, through the airport in Aleppo. (Note: The flight later became a regular route in 1929 until the emergence of World War II.) The airport was upgraded and developed over the years until 1999 when the new current terminal was inaugurated.

=== Syrian civil war ===
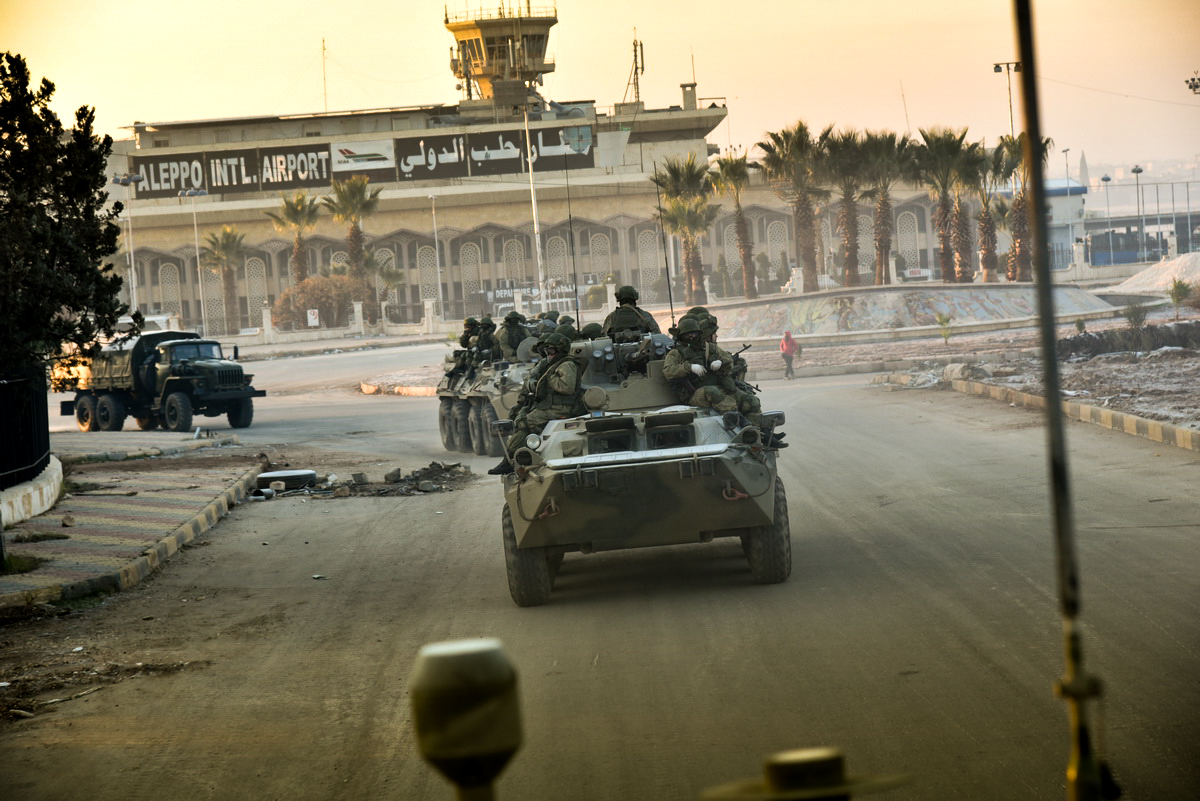
Russian soldiers near the airport during the Battle of Aleppo, 2016

In January 2013, the facility closed due to the Syrian civil war, but after Syrian Arab Army advances were made in the area, the airport briefly re-opened on 22 January 2014, welcoming its first civilian flight in more than a year (flights were suspended in December 2012), carrying foreign journalists to the city.

Following the Syrian government's recapture of eastern Aleppo during the Battle of Aleppo, an airplane conducted its first flight from the airport in four years. The flight, conducted on 5 January 2017, was a trial attempt by the government before the airport fully opened to the public.

On 17 February 2020, Syrian Transport Minister Ali Hammoud announced that the airport would resume civilian operations, with the first flight from Damascus to Aleppo scheduled for 19 February, and an additional route to Cairo soon thereafter.

On 1 March 2020, the airport was targeted by Turkish drone and artillery strikes during the Operation Spring Shield.

After an eight-year hiatus due to the Syrian Civil War, flights resumed on 19 February 2020, with the inaugural flight originating from Damascus International Airport.

On 15 January 2021, scheduled flights to Beirut and Erbil were resumed after a hiatus due to the COVID-19 pandemic.

=== Israeli air raids ===
==== 2022 ====
In June 2022, after the Israeli bombing of Damascus International Airport, all Cham Wings Airlines flights from Damascus were rerouted to Aleppo.

On 6 September, Israeli Air Force warplanes struck the airport from the direction of the Mediterranean Sea, west of Latakia, with air-to-surface missiles damaging the runway and putting it out of service.

==== 2023 ====
On 7 March 2023, the Israeli airstrikes hit the airport, targeting alleged Iranian weapons transfers. The Syrian transport ministry said that the delivery of humanitarian aid to Idlib Governorate following the February earthquake would be rerouted to Damascus and Latakia Airports after the "Israeli aggression". Later that month, on 22 March, Israel launched missiles at the airport for the third time in six months. On 1 May, Israeli airstrikes which targeted an ammunition depot at the military airport killed a Syrian soldier and injured seven people including two civilians. On 28 August, another Israeli airstrike hit the airport, causing runway damage and shutting the airport down until the following day.

On 12 October, Israel launched a large missile attack against both Aleppo and Damascus airports, which damaged their runways and made them temporarily closed, during the skirmishes which occurred across the border, contemporaneously with the Gaza war. Two days later, Israel retargeted the airport from the direction of the sea, west of Latakia, which put it out of service again. On 22 October, both Aleppo and Damascus airports were hit simultaneously, the third attack in two weeks.

==== 2024 ====
On 28 March, an airstrike by Israel after midnight aimed at an arms depot in Jibrin, near Aleppo International Airport, led to the deaths of 36 Syrian soldiers and 6 Hezbollah fighters, according to SOHR.

=== Post-Ba'athist Syria ===
On 30 November 2024, the Syrian Democratic Forces took control of the airport amidst the attack on Aleppo and the subsequent withdrawal of the pro-government forces. Afterwards, militants with Hayat Tahrir al-Sham took over the airport, and captured 10 military aircraft.

On 18 March 2025, the first commercial flight since the fall of the Assad regime landed at Aleppo International Airport after it reopened for air traffic.

== Statistics ==
Historical statistics for Aleppo International Airport are shown in the table below:

Operations and statistics
Year	Passengers	Airfreight (tonnes)	Aircraft
2025	226,260	–	–

== Facilities ==
Aleppo International Airport has a modern terminal which combines modern and Islamic architecture. The total area is 38,000 square meters over four floors. The airport capacity is 1.7 million passengers a year. Post-war it has been refurbished using assistance from Qatar.

== Airlines and destinations ==
Airlines	Destinations
Air Arabia	Abu Dhabi, Sharjah
AJet	Istanbul–Sabiha Gökçen
Dan Air	Bucharest–Otopeni
EgyptAir	Cairo (resumes 6 December 2026)
Fly Cham	Adana–Mersin, Sharjah, Yerevan
Flydubai	Dubai–International
Flynas	Jeddah, Riyadh
Jazeera Airways	Kuwait City
LEAV Aviation	Cologne/Bonn, Düsseldorf
Pegasus Airlines	Istanbul–Sabiha Gökçen
Qatar Airways	Doha
Royal Jordanian	Amman–Queen Alia
SunExpress	Antalya, İzmir
Syrian Airlines	Cairo (begins 7 December 2026), Damascus, Doha, Jeddah, Kuwait City, Moscow–Sheremetyevo
Turkish Airlines	Istanbul

Aleppo International Airport passenger destinations map (20 November 2026)
