= Cham Wings Airlines =

Syrian private airline

IATA	ICAO	Call sign
6Q	SAW	SHAMWING
- Founded: 2007
- Ceased operations: 5 June 2025
- Hubs: Damascus International Airport
- Secondary hubs: Aleppo International Airport
- Focus cities: Kuwait City, Sharjah
- Frequent-flyer program: Cham Miles
- Fleet size: 5
- Destinations: 17
- Headquarters: Damascus, Syria
- Key people: Issam Shammout, Chairman
- Website: www.chamwings.com

Cham Wings Airlines (Arabic: أجنحة الشام للطيران, previously known as Sham Wing Airlines) was a private Syrian airline, with its head office located in Damascus, Syria. The company slogan was Fly Beyond The Limits.

Cham Wings Airline and its owner Issam Shammout were under US and European Union sanctions for alleged involvement in flying mercenaries to Libya, illegal migrants to Belarus, and transporting weapons and trafficking Captagon. After the fall of Assad regime, Shammout entered into a settlement with the new Syrian state by giving up his share of the company, paying $50 million, and transferring two A320 aircraft to state-owned Syrian Air in exchange for immunity from state prosecution. The airline's remaining assets, including three remaining A320s, were purchased by a Syrian-Emirati joint venture on June 5 2025, which subsequently rebranded and launched a new airline, Fly Cham, following regulatory approval.

== History ==
Cham Wings Airlines was established on 9 July 2006 as the first private airline in Syria by Syrian businessman Issam Shammout. The main hub for the airline is Damascus International Airport. The company officially obtained an Aircraft Operators Certificate (AOC) issued by the Syrian Civil Aviation Authority (SCAA) on 23 September 2007.

Although the AOC comes second after the main national carrier of Syria, Syrian Air, the AOC authorised the company to operate non-scheduled charter flights only. The company leased one MD aircraft and commenced its first flight from Damascus to Baghdad International Airport on 3 March 2008. In 2008, a newcomer entered the market under the name Syrian Pearl Airlines which was owned by Cham Holding at 69% (Rami Makhlouf major shareholder), Syrianair at 25%, and Aqeeq Aviation/Aquila Holding 6%, (Aqeeq and Al Deshtei Kuwaiti).

The partnership with Syrian Air gave Syrian Pearl the opportunity to operate scheduled flights, unlike Cham Wings which struggled in operating charter flights to destinations that Syrian Air hardly approves. Even though Syrian Pearl never started its operations, Cham Wings could not turn profitable operating only charter flights. The company ceased operations in 2012 following the unrest in Syria.

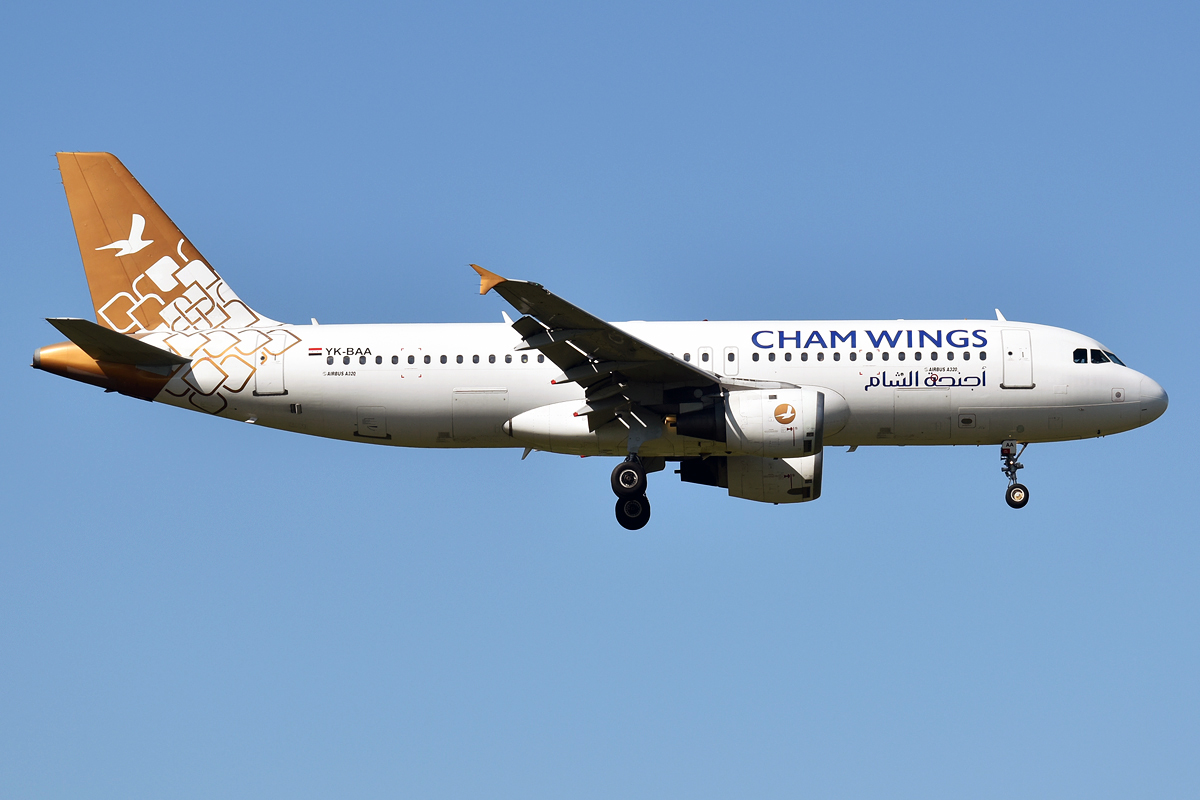
Airbus A320-212 of Cham Wings Airlines

In 2014, Cham Wings Airlines obtained the approval to operate scheduled flights becoming the second national carrier in Syria. It then recommenced its operations to serve destinations like Beirut, Kuwait, Baghdad, and Qamishli. In 2016, it was targeted by United States sanctions for providing support to the Syrian government. In 2018, the airline advertised transporting Syrian refugees in Germany from Munich to Damascus and back, which can lead to the loss of their asylum status. In June 2021, Ukraine blacklisted the airline due to the flights to Crimea.

Due to the ongoing Belarus–European Union border crisis, Cham Wings Airlines terminated their flights from Damascus to Minsk on short notice in November 2021, stating they cannot distinguish between regular travellers and illegal migrants. In December 2021, the European Union sanctioned Cham Wings Airlines, accusing it of flying migrants to the Belarusian-Polish border and exacerbating the crisis. Switzerland joined the EU sanctions on 20 December. EU sanctions imposed as a result of this accusation were lifted on 19 July 2022.

Cham Wings Airlines resumed service on 7 Jan 2025, following the ousting of Bashar al-Assad.

=== Dissolution, acquisition and rebranding ===
After the fall of the Assad regime, Cham Wings owner Issam Shammout, who was under US and European Union sanctions for alleged involvement in flying mercenaries to Libya, illegal migrants to Belarus, and transporting weapons and trafficking Captagon, entered into a settlement with the new Syrian state apparatus. In exchange for immunity from state prosecution, Shammout gave up his share of the company. He also paid $50 million and handed over two aircraft to state-owned Syrian Air.

The airline's remaining assets were purchased by Emirati company Rawdat Al Reef Project Services LLC and the Syrian company Rawdat Al Reef Project Management Services LLC as partners on 5 June 2025. The new owners acquired the rest of the assets of Cham Wings Airlines, including the remaining three A320s, and launched a rebranded carrier, Fly Cham, following regulatory approval.

Most of Cham Wings Airlines' employees, cabin crew, and pilots maintained their similar position in the new company Fly Cham.

== Ownership ==
Cham Wings Airlines was 100% privately owned by Syrian businessman Issam Shammout. The airline was part of his family business Shammout Groups, which operate in the automotive, steel and freight sectors.

== Criticism ==
Despite the Russian invasion in Ukraine, Cham Wings Airlines continues to operate flights to Russia, maintaining regular services between Damascus and Moscow's Sheremetyevo International Airport. Despite international sanctions imposed by the United States in 2016 and the European Union in 2021 and 2024, the airline has sustained its operations, including its Russian routes. Cham Wings has been implicated in transporting Syrian mercenaries and engaging in activities that support the Syrian regime, leading to its inclusion in various sanctions lists. The airline remained active in the Russian market, continuing its flight services between Syria and Russia, until its dissolution in 2025.

== Destinations ==
At the time of closure, Cham Wings Airline operates 2 domestic and 12 international destinations to Middle East, North Africa, Central Asia and Eastern Europe from its hub in Damascus.

=== Middle East and North Africa ===
- Abu Dhabi, United Arab Emirates
- Baghdad, Iraq
- Basra, Iraq
- Beirut, Lebanon
- Benghazi, Libya
- Erbil, Iraq
- Kuwait City
- Muscat, Oman
- Najaf, Iraq
- Sharjah, United Arab Emirates
- Tehran, Iran

=== Central Asia ===
- Yerevan, Armenia

=== Eastern Europe ===
- Moscow, Russia

=== Domestic destinations ===
Cham Wings Airlines also operates only two domestic destinations from its hub in Damascus to Aleppo and Qamishli.

== Fleet ==
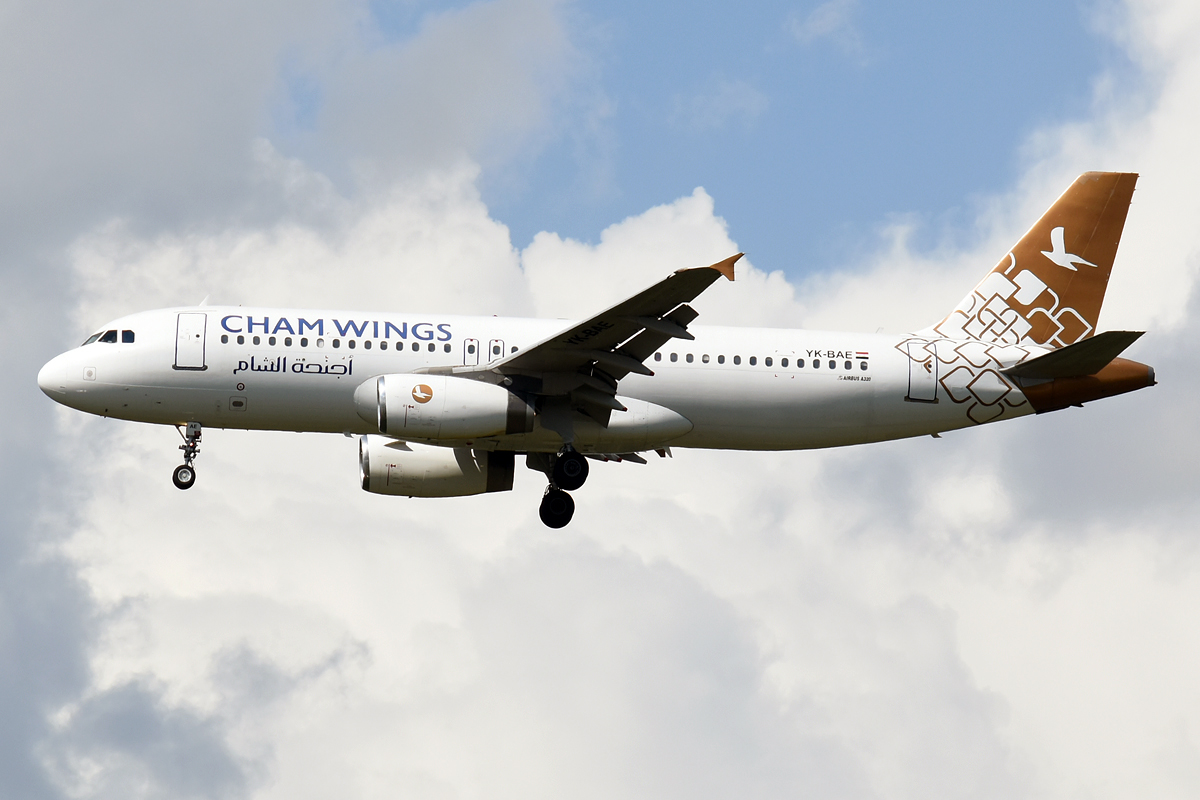
Cham Wings Airbus A320-231.

As of August 2025, Cham Wings Airlines operates the following aircraft:

Cham Wings Airlines fleet
Aircraft	In service	Orders	Passengers			Notes/sources
Aircraft	In service	Orders	C	Y	Total	Notes/sources
Airbus A320-200	4	—	8	156	164	
Airbus A320-200	1	—	0	174	174	
Total	5	—				

== See also ==
- Fly Cham
