= Sharjah International Airport =

Airport in Sharjah, United Arab Emirates

Sharjah International Airport مطار الشارقة

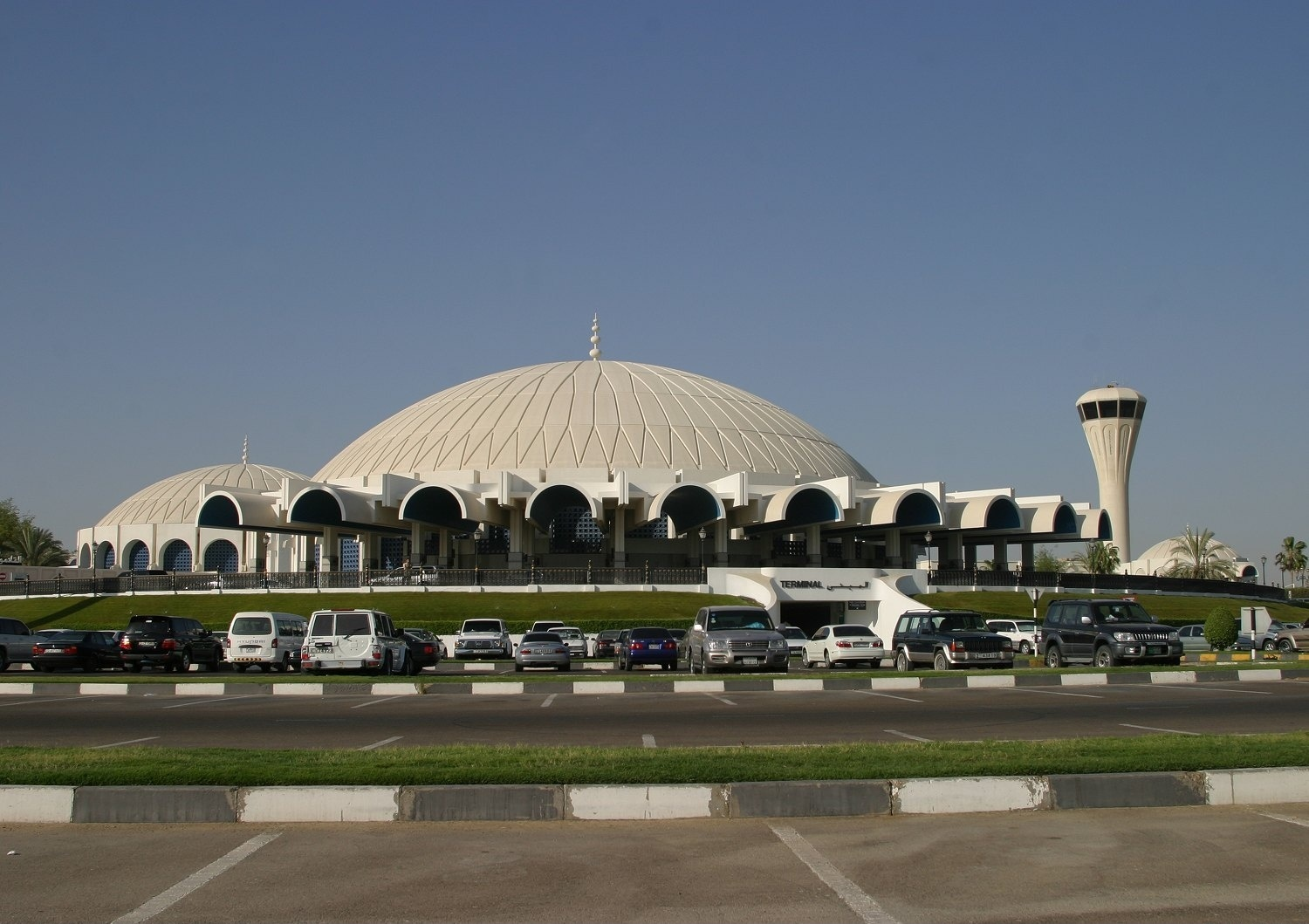
- IATA: SHJ; ICAO: OMSJ

Summary
- Airport type: Public / military
- Operator: Sharjah Airport
- Serves: Sharjah, Ajman (city), Dubai
- Location: Sharjah
- Operating base for: Air Arabia
- Time zone: UAE Standard Time (UTC+04:00)
- Elevation AMSL: 116 ft (35 m)
- Coordinates: 25°19′45″N 055°30′58″E
- Website: www.sharjahairport.ae

Map
- Location in the UAE SHJ/OMSJ (Middle East) SHJ/OMSJ (Asia)

Runways
Direction	Length		Surface
Direction	m	ft	Surface
12/30	4,060	13,320	Asphalt

Statistics (2024)
- Passengers: 17,101,725 (▲11.4%)
- Movements: 132,786 (▲8.8%)
- Cargo tonnage: 318,522 (▲10.8%)
- Sources: UAE AIP; Statistics from Sharjah International Airport

Sharjah International Airport (Arabic: مطار الشارقة, romanized: Maṭār aš-Šāriqa) (IATA: SHJ, ICAO: OMSJ) is an international airport located 7 nautical miles (13 km; 8.1 mi) east-southeast of Sharjah, United Arab Emirates. It is spread over an area of 15,200,000 m^{2} (3,800 acres). It is the 3rd busiest airport in the country as well as the 10th busiest airport in the Middle East. It has one runway, and is the only airport in Sharjah capable of international flights as of 2025. By 2027, it is expected to increase its capacity to 25 million passengers annually.

== Overview ==
Sharjah International Airport is the third largest Middle East air freight hub in cargo tonnage, according to official 2015 statistics from Airports Council International. Ground services company, Sharjah Aviation Services, handled 586,195 tonnes in 2015 – a 16.1% increase year on year. It has one passenger terminal with an area of 125,000 m^{2} (1,350,000 sq ft).

Sharjah International Airport is home base of the low-cost carrier Air Arabia. The headquarters of Air Arabia is in the Sharjah Freight Center, on the property of the airport in Sharjah, UAE. The center is an old cargo terminal.

On 1 January 1977, the airport opened and it replaced RAF Sharjah, which was closer to the city and was opened in 1932. It was the first airport in UAE and the Cooperation Council for the Arab States of the Gulf, for use by Imperial Airways, and was subsequently used by the RAF until 14 December 1971. The reason for the move was development pressure from the city of Sharjah. The old terminal and tower building is now Al Mahatta Museum. The old airport's runway is now part of King Abdul Aziz Street in the city centre.

The airport was used by the United States Air Force 926th Tactical Fighter Group during Operation Desert Shield/Storm. Approximately 450 members of the unit were stationed at the airport, which flew A-10 Thunderbolt II ground attack aircraft during the conflict in late 1990 and early 1991.

== Facilities ==
The airport is at an elevation of 116 feet (35 m) above mean sea level. It has one runway designated 12/30 with an asphalt surface measuring 4,060 m × 60 m (13,320 ft × 197 ft).

Founded in 1985, Sharjah Airport Travel Agency is owned by the Sharjah Airport Authority, Government of Sharjah and has 14 branches in the UAE, including one on the first floor of the main terminal at Sharjah Airport.

== Airlines and destinations ==
=== Passenger ===
The following airlines operate regular scheduled and charter flights to and from Sharjah:

Airlines	Destinations
Air Arabia	Abha, Addis Ababa, Ahmedabad, Aleppo, Alexandria, Almaty, Al Najaf, Amman–City, Amman–Queen Alia, Athens, Baghdad, Bahrain, Baku, Bangkok–Suvarnabhumi, Basra, Beirut, Bengaluru, Bishkek, Bosaso, Cairo, Chennai, Chittagong, Cochin, Coimbatore, Colombo–Bandaranaike, Damascus, Dammam, Delhi, Dhaka, Doha, Entebbe, Erbil, Faisalabad, Frankfurt (begins 15 December 2026), Gassim, Giza, Gdańsk (begins 14 December 2026), Goa–Mopa, Ha'il, Hyderabad, Istanbul, Istanbul–Sabiha Gökçen, Jaipur, Jeddah, Jizan, Karachi, Kathmandu, Katowice (begins 17 December 2026), Kazan, Kozhikode, Krabi, Kraków, Kuala Lumpur, Kuwait City, London–Gatwick, Malé, Milan-Bergamo, Moscow-Domodedovo, Multan, Mumbai, Munich, Muscat, Nagpur, Nairobi–Jomo Kenyatta, Prague, Riyadh, Rome–Fiumicino, Salalah, Samara, Sohag, Sohar, Tabuk, Ta'if, Tashkent, Tbilisi, Thiruvananthapuram, Trabzon, Ufa, Vienna, Warsaw–Chopin, Warsaw–Modlin, Yerevan; Seasonal: Namangan, Phuket, Sarajevo, Sochi
airblue	Islamabad, Lahore, Multan
Air Cairo	Cairo; Seasonal: Assiut
Air India Express	Amritsar, Bhopal, Chandigarh, Delhi, Indore, Jaipur, Kannur, Kochi, Kozhikode, Mumbai, Surat, Thiruvananthapuram, Tiruchirapalli, Varanasi, Vijayawada
AJet	Istanbul–Sabiha Gökçen
Belavia	Seasonal charter: Minsk
Biman Bangladesh Airlines	Chittagong, Sylhet
Caspian Airlines	Ahvaz, Bandar Abbas, Lar, Qeshm, Tehran–Imam Khomeini
Egyptair	Cairo
Ethiopian Airlines	Addis Ababa
Fly Cham	Damascus
Fly Jinnah	Islamabad, Lahore
IndiGo	Amritsar, Bengaluru, Delhi, Hyderabad, Kochi, Lucknow, Mumbai, Thiruvananthapuram
Iraqi Airways	Baghdad
Jordan Aviation	Amman–Queen Alia
Kenya Airways	Nairobi
Nile Air	Cairo
Pegasus Airlines	Istanbul–Sabiha Gokçen
Pakistan International Airlines	Peshawar, Sialkot
Qatar Airways	Doha
Royal Jordanian	Amman–Queen Alia
SalamAir	Muscat
SpiceJet	Ahmedabad
Syrian Air	Damascus
Ural Airlines	Seasonal: Moscow–Domodedovo, Yekaterinburg
US-Bangla Airlines	Dhaka
Varesh Airlines	Chabahar/Konarak

=== Cargo ===
Airlines	Destinations
Astral Aviation	Eldoret
EgyptAir Cargo	Cairo
Ethiopian Cargo	Addis Ababa
Singapore Airlines Cargo	Amsterdam, Brussels, London–Heathrow, Singapore
UPS Airlines	Cologne, Hong Kong, Seoul–Incheon, Shenzhen

== Statistics ==
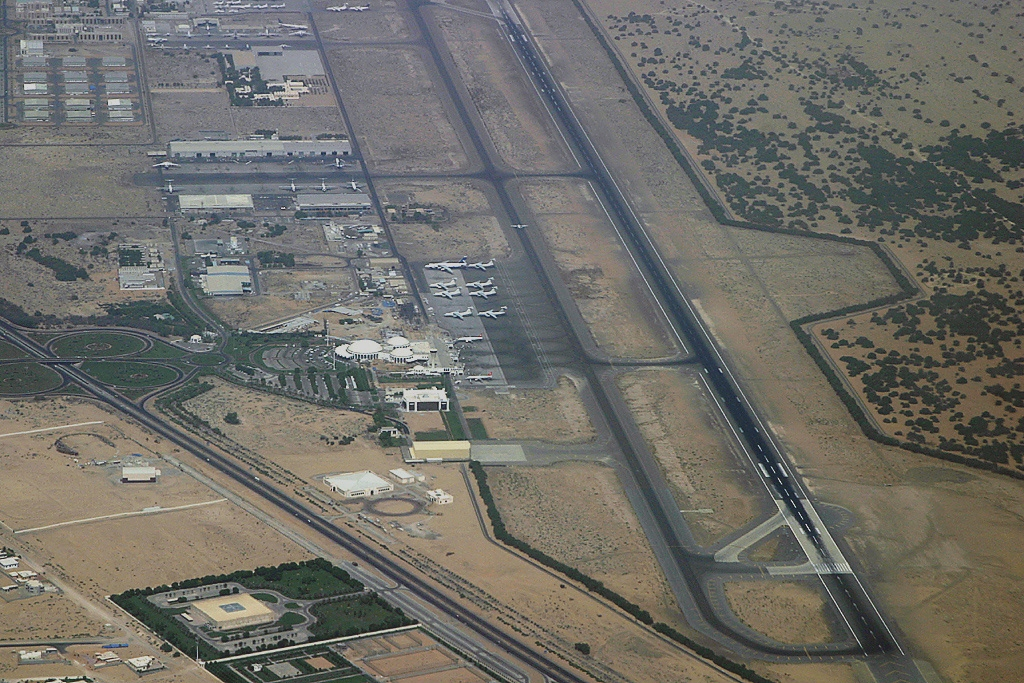
Aerial view

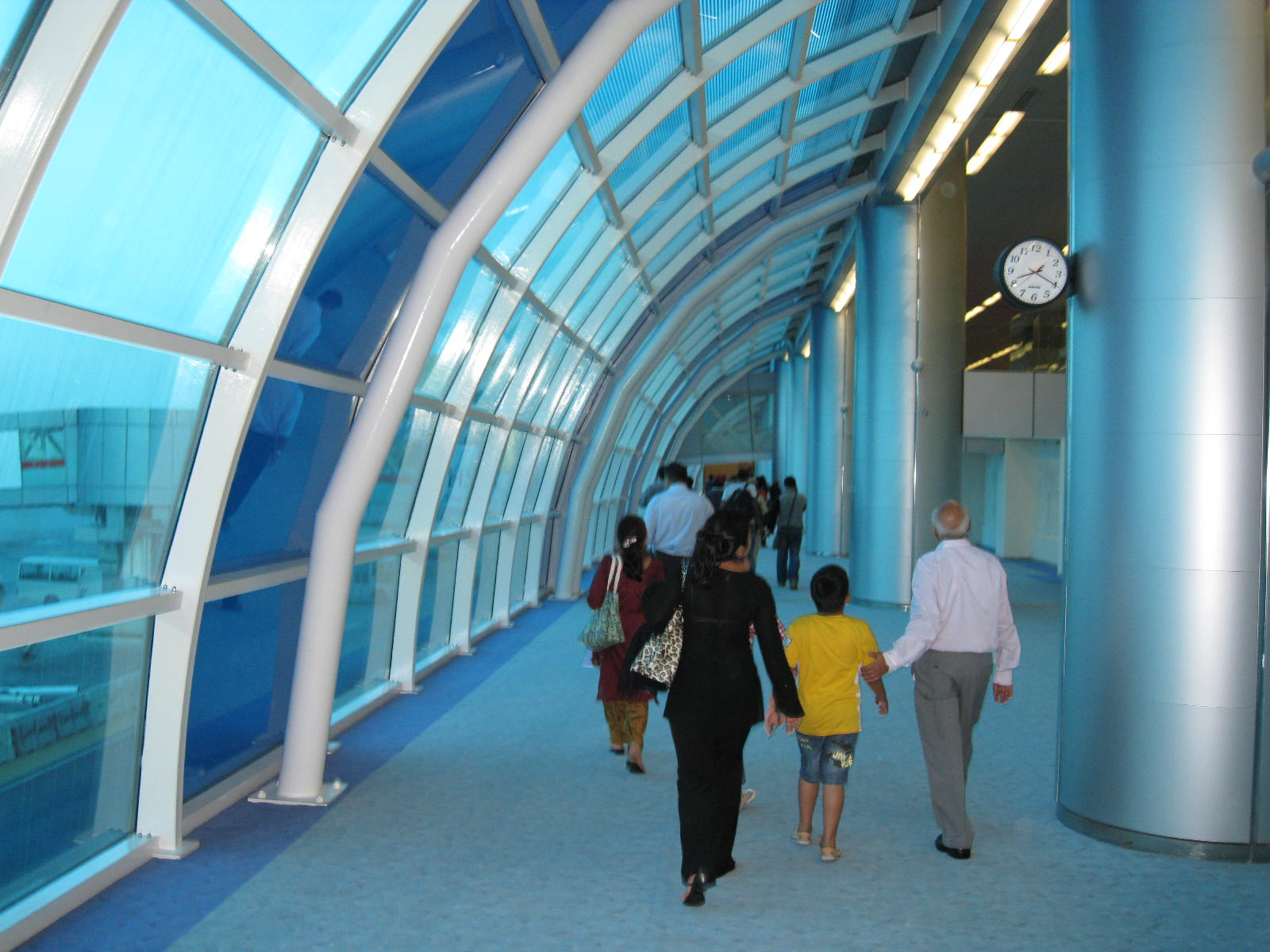
Terminal interior

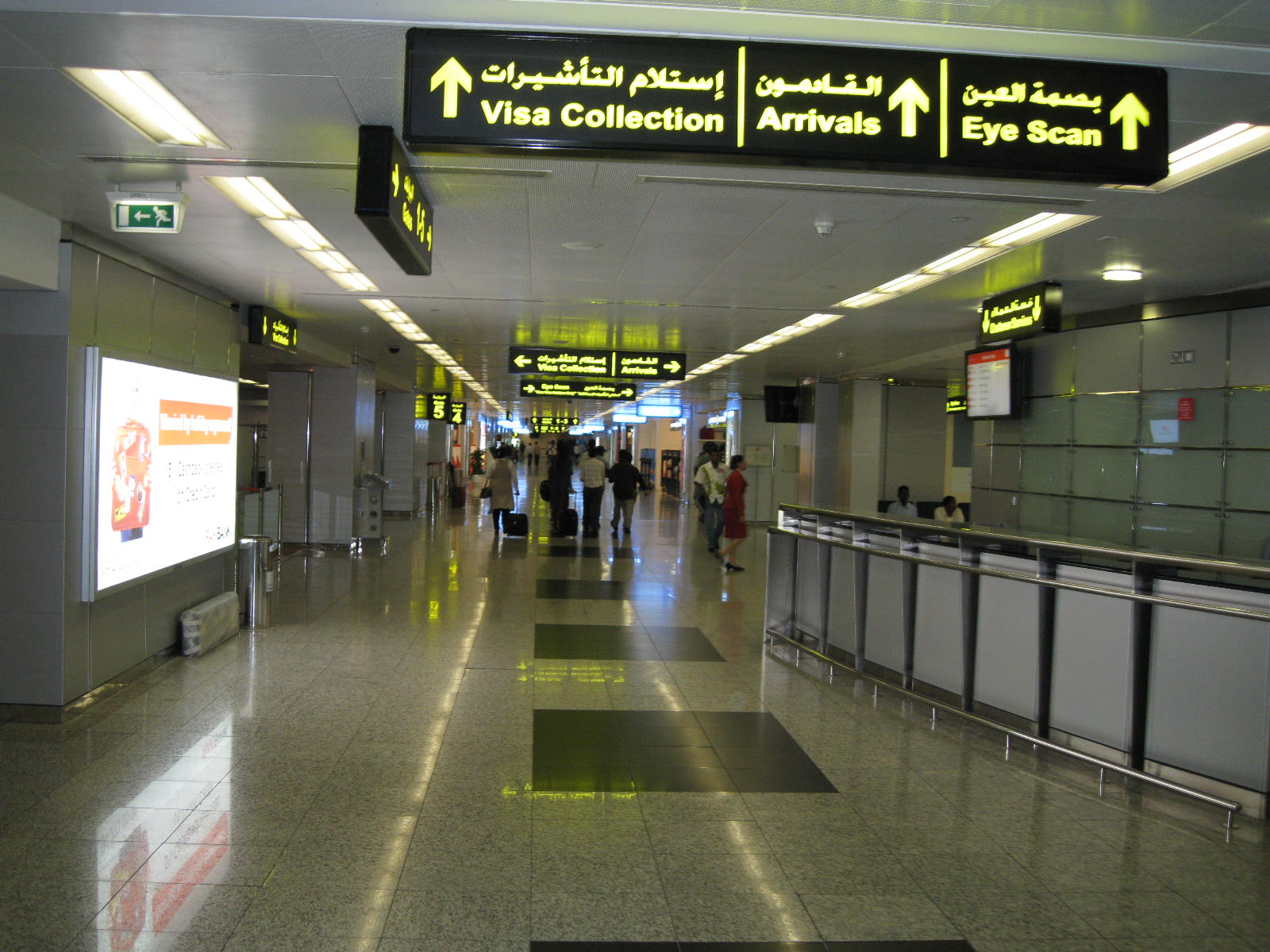
Terminal interior

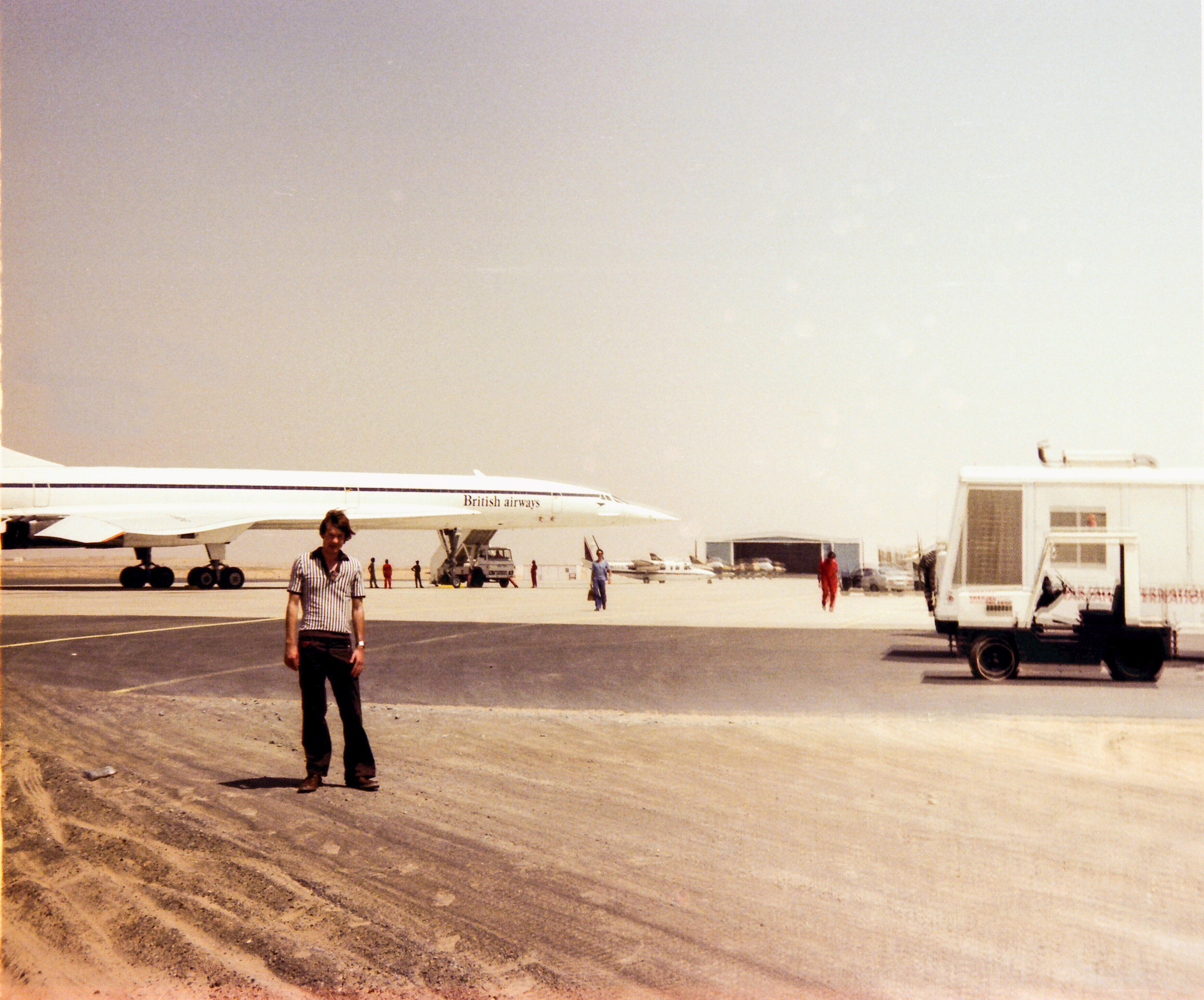
A British Airways Concorde in Sharjah on 20 August 1977

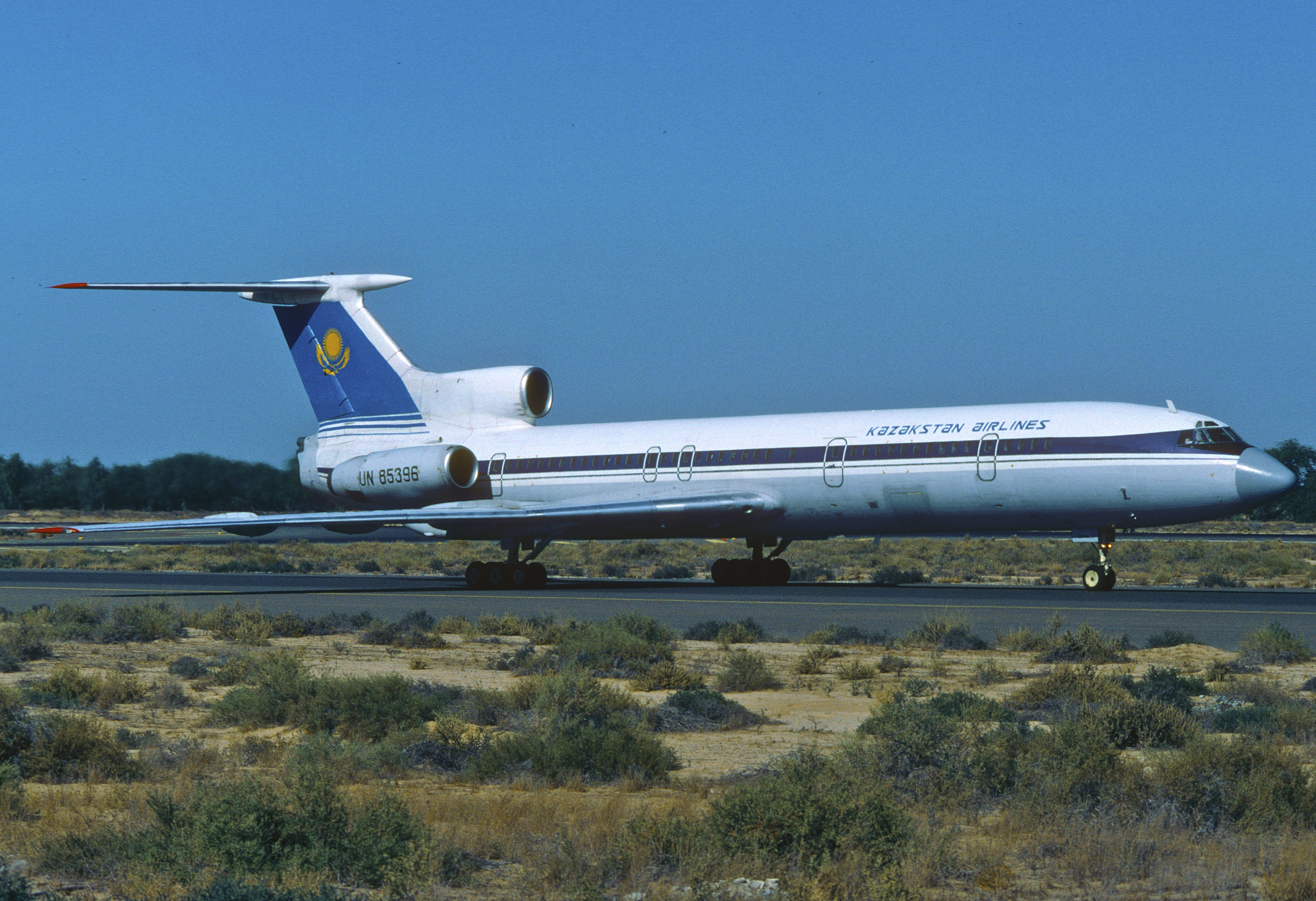
A Kazakhstan Airlines Tu-154 in Sharjah on 1 October 1994

Year	Total passengers	Total Airfreight	Total aircraft movements
1999	1,001,852	580,550	27,577
2000	948,207	475,122	25,997
2001	861,478	415,587	24,431
2002	1,028,624	497,010	24,803
2003	1,247,458	507,644	28,017
2004	1,661,941	500,927	32,334
2005	2,237,646	505,392	38,699
2006	3,064,396	569,511	44,182
2007	4,324,313	570,363	51,314
2008	5,280,445	586,677	60,813
2009	5,764,098	501,824	61,451
2011	6,600,000	417,116	63,737
2012	7,516,538	475,116	65,975
2013	8,505,268	493,402	66,247
2014	9,516,600	528,250	70,559
2015	10,039,000	240,000	71,426
2016	11,048,000	180,900	75,900
2017	11,360,000	148,312	77,627
2018	12,040,000	132,660	81,260
2019	13,600,000	148,700	86,506
2020	4,200,000	99,600	33,200
2021	7,000,000	140,717	57,679
2022	13,100,000	141,000	87,495
2023	15,356,212	141,358	98,000
2024	17,101,725	195,909	107,670
2025	19,480,000	204,323	116,657

== Accidents and incidents ==
- On 15 December 1997, a Tupolev Tu-154 from Tajikistan Airlines Flight 3183 crashed on approach to SHJ. Some 13 km from Sharjah the plane ran into terrain and 85 of the 86 occupants died. One of the seven crew members survived the disaster.
- On 10 February 2004, Kish Air Flight 7170, operated by a Fokker 50 crashed on approach, killing 43 of its 46 occupants, which consisted of 3 crew and 40 passengers.
- On 7 November 2004, an Air Atlanta Boeing 747 freighter was damaged beyond repair due to an aborted take-off with insufficient runway remaining. None of the four crew was injured. The take-off was aborted after a report of smoke from the control tower and hearing a loud bang in the cockpit.
- On 21 October 2009, Azza Transport Flight 2241, operated by a Boeing 707–320, crashed on take-off. The flight was carrying cargo only and all six crew members were killed.

== See also ==
- Mahatta Fort, the previous site of the airport
- List of the busiest airports in the Middle East
