= Damascus International Airport =

International airport serving Damascus, Syria

Damascus International Airport مطار دمشق الدولي
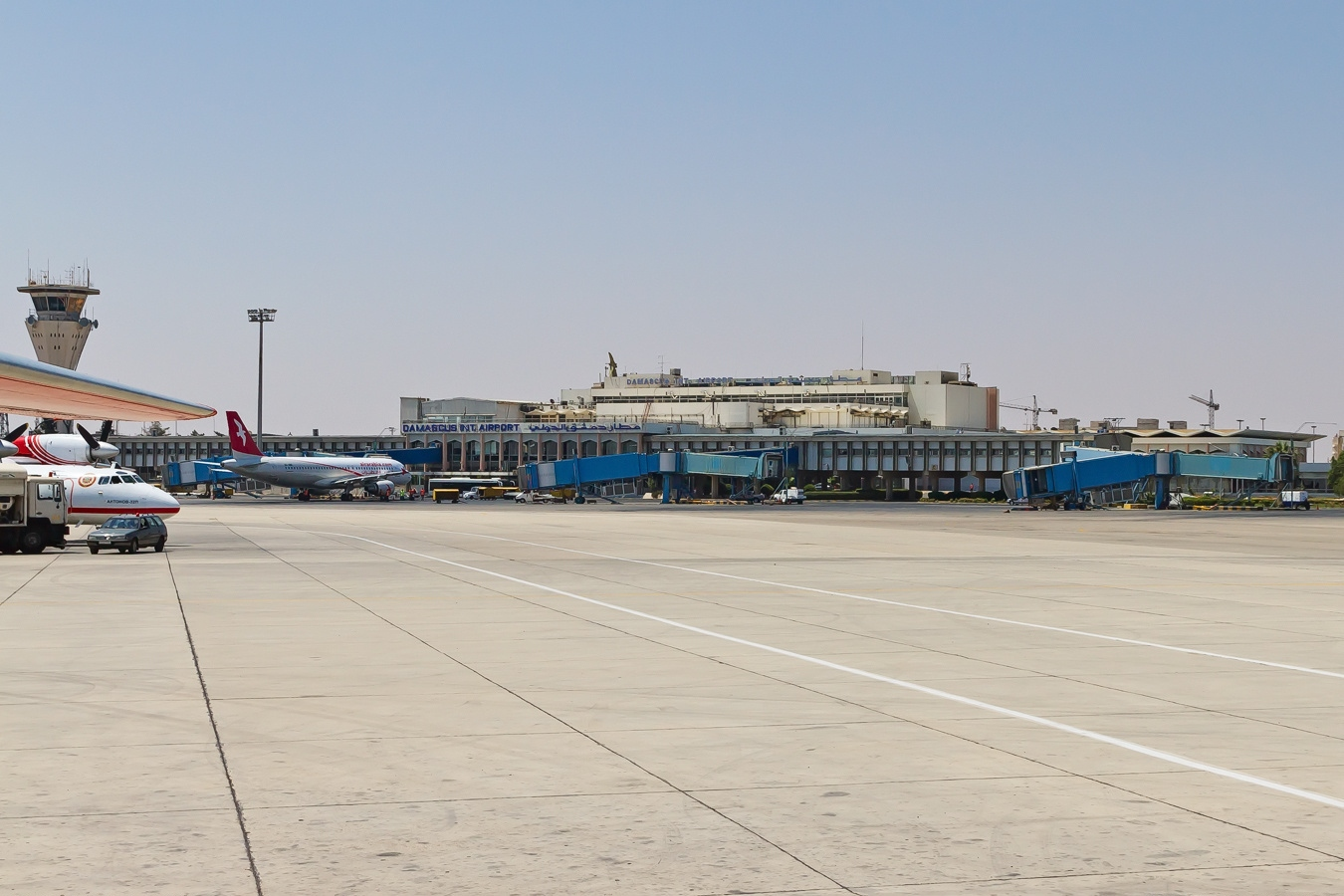
- IATA: DAM; ICAO: OSDI

Summary
- Airport type: Public
- Owner: Government of Syria
- Operator: General Authority of Civil Aviation
- Serves: Damascus, Syria
- Opened: 1973; 53 years ago
- Hub for: Syrian Airlines; Fly Cham
- Built: 1965
- Time zone: AST (UTC+03:00)
- Elevation AMSL: 616 m (2,021 ft)
- Coordinates: 33°24′41″N 36°30′56″E
- Website: damairport.gov.sy

Maps
- Location of airport in Syria DAM (Middle East) DAM (West and Central Asia) DAM (Asia)
- Interactive map of Damascus International Airport

Runways
Direction	Length		Surface
Direction	m	ft	Surface
05R/23L	3,600	11,811	Asphalt
05L/23R	3,598	11,804	Asphalt

Statistics (2025)
- Passengers: 1,392,699 (▲)

Damascus International Airport (Arabic: مَطَار دِمَشْق الدَّوْلِيّ, romanized: Maṭār Dimašq al-Duwalī; IATA: DAM, ICAO: OSDI) is the international airport of Damascus, the capital of Syria and the home base of the national flag carrier airline, Syrian Airlines. Damascus International Airport serves as a primary gateway to Syria and is one of the largest airports in the country along with Aleppo International Airport and Latakia International Airport. Inaugurated in the mid-1970s, it also is the country's busiest airport.

== History ==
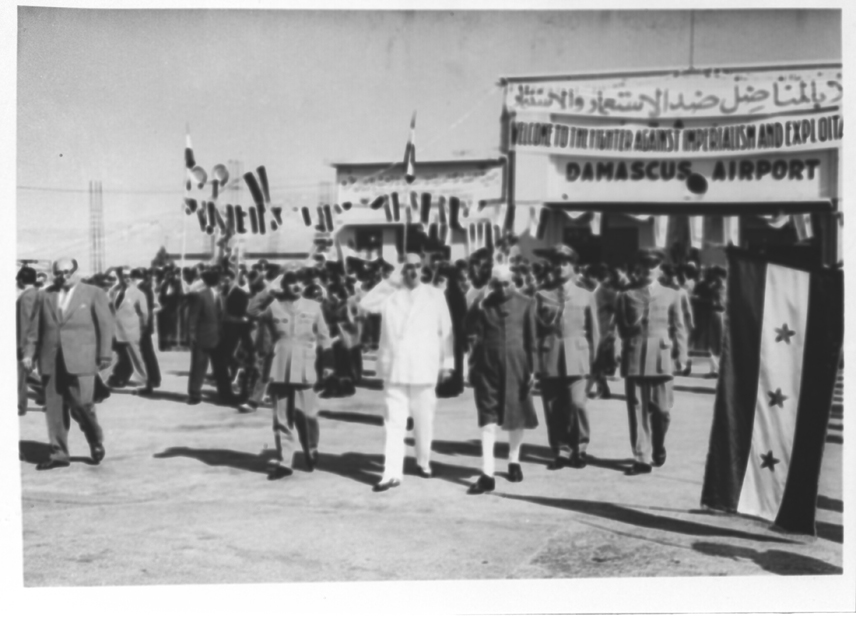
Jawaharlal Nehru at Damascus Airport

=== Establishment and early years ===
In 1965, the construction of the airport was entrusted to a group of French companies (SCB, CSF, Spie and Cegelec), with SCB leading the project. Damascus International Airport was opened in the late 1960s, replacing the old Mazzeh military airport that previously served as the city's main aviation hub. The airport was built to accommodate the growing air traffic and to enhance Syria's connectivity with the rest of the world. In the 1980s, the airport was served by over 30 airlines and had nonstop flights to destinations in Europe, North Africa, the Middle East, and South Asia. It was also a stop-over on a Pakistan International Airlines route from Karachi and Islamabad to New York and Toronto.

In the following years, Damascus Airport underwent several expansion and modernisation projects in order to meet the increasing demands of international and domestic travellers. New terminals, runways, and facilities were constructed to enhance passenger services and improve operational efficiency. In March 2007, Iran Air inaugurated a flight from Tehran to Caracas via Damascus. Its codeshare partner Conviasa took over the route seven months later.

=== Syrian civil war ===
With the onset of the Syrian civil war, the airport and approach roads were closed intermittently and most international airlines ceased flights. Conviasa ended its direct service to Caracas in August 2012.

In June 2022, Damascus International Airport suffered major damage, including to runways, following an Israeli missile attack targeting alleged Iranian weapons transfers. Flights were halted to and from the airport for two weeks due to the extensive damage to infrastructure. On 2 January 2023, Damascus International Airport temporarily went out of service after another Israeli missile strike, which killed at least 2 soldiers, before returning to operation 7 hours later after the damage was repaired. It is announced that Syrian Airlines plans to establish a joint venture with a private company to invest, manage, and operate its activities and those of the airport.

On 12 October 2023, Damascus International Airport was temporarily closed due to a damaged runway following Israeli missile attacks on both it and Aleppo International Airport, during the skirmishes which occurred across the border in connection with the Gaza war. The airport was put back into service on 18 October. On 22 October, both Aleppo and Damascus airports were hit simultaneously, putting them out of service for the second time within two weeks. Two workers were killed during the attack. On 26 November 2023, hours after the airport was put back into service from the previous attack, Israel targeted the airport with missiles, causing material losses and putting the airport out of service again.

=== Post-Ba'athist Syria ===
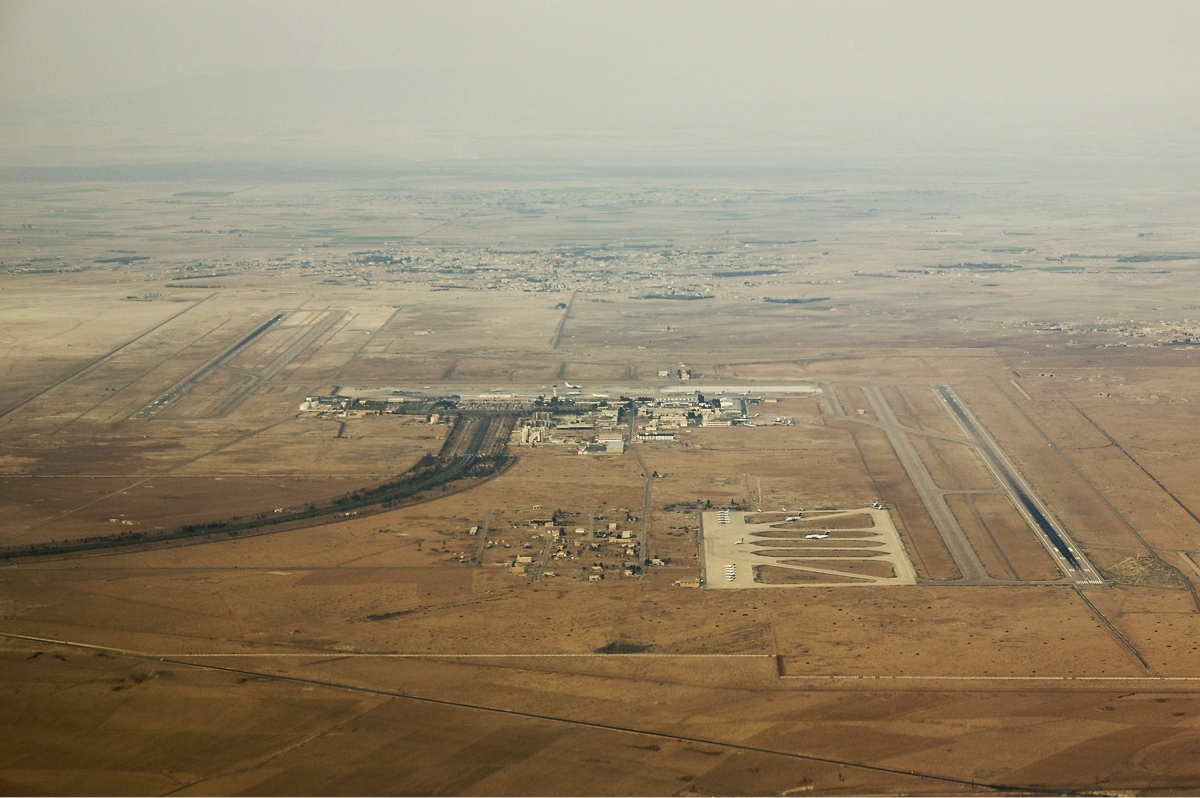
Aerial view

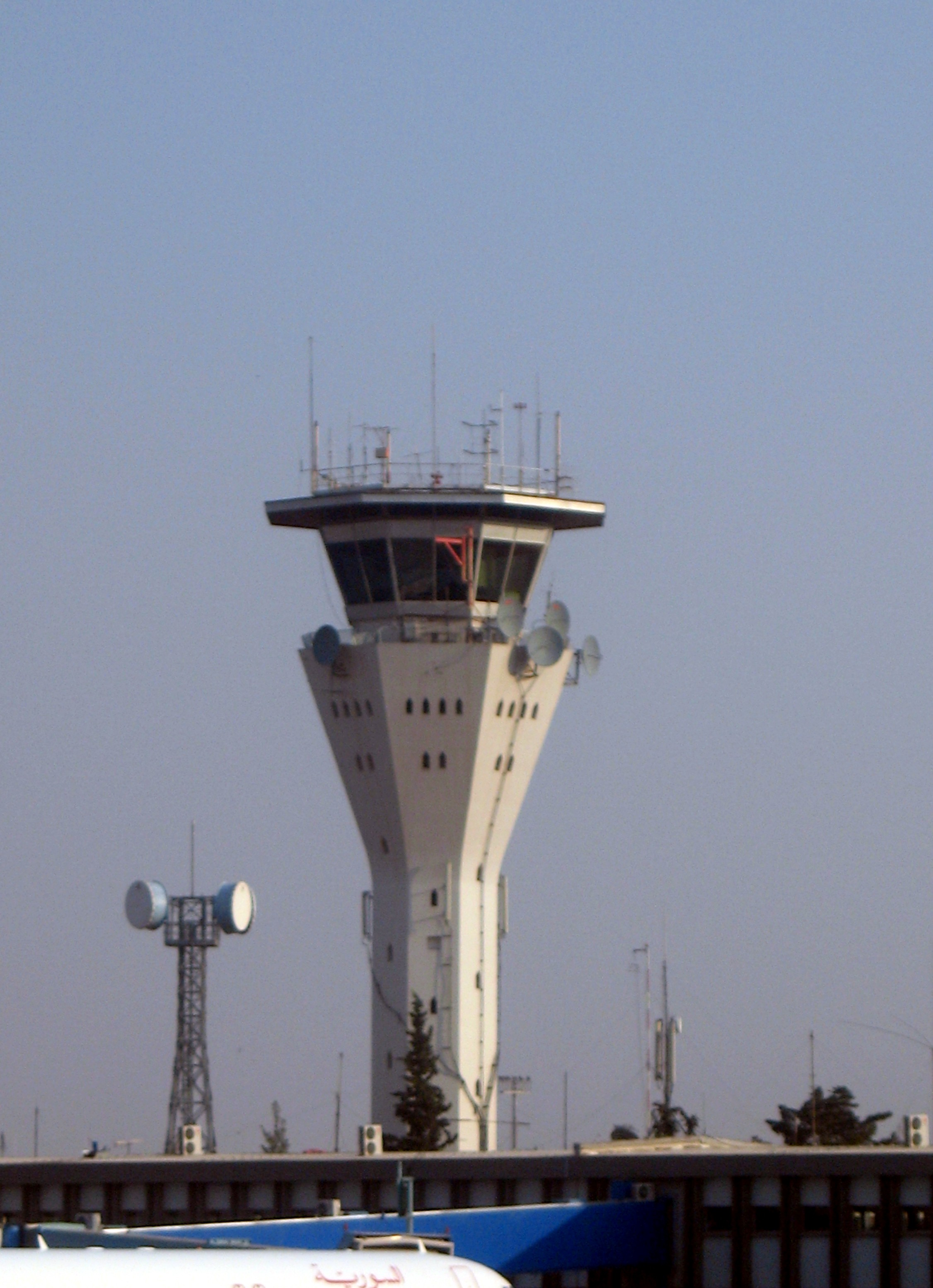
Air traffic control tower

The airport was closed during the opposition offensive on Damascus on 8 December 2024. On 18 December 2024, commercial operations resumed with the first flight taking off with 32 passengers heading to Aleppo. On 4 January 2025, the Syrian transitional government announced that international flights would resume from 7 January, for the first time since the fall of the Assad regime. Services would later resume on 7 January, with the arrival of a Qatar Airways flight from Doha.

In February 2025, with the help of the Turkish government, the airport began its renovation. The General Authority of Civil Aviation signed a $4 billion investment to refurbish the airport, including the construction of a new 5-star hotel.

In January 2026, Turkey installed a new radar system to modernize civil aviation infrastructure, improve safety standards, and enhance the efficiency of airspace management around the airport.

== Infrastructure ==
=== Airfield ===
The current runways allow the landing of virtually all types of aircraft currently in use (including Airbus A380, Boeing 787 Dreamliner and Boeing 747-8). The airport has two parallel runways (05R/23L and 05L/23R), both 3,600 metres (11,800 ft) in length, which were completely renovated in the 2010s.

Runways
NE	Length	Width	SW
05R →	3,600 m 11,800 ft	—	← 23L
05L →	3,600 m 11,800 ft	—	← 23R

=== Terminals ===
The airport is of Islamic architecture, and has two terminals, one for international flights and the other for domestic flights. The airport features two duty-free outlets. The departures hall also includes an in-house coffee shop, several souvenir shops, three restaurants, and a lounge for first and business class passengers. The southern part of the airport has hardened aircraft shelters and artillery revetments. The second terminal has a capacity to handle 25 million passengers.

On 4 August 2025, Syria and Qatar signed a US$4 billion agreement for the construction of a third passenger terminal. The project is funded by Qatar's UCC Holding and aims to expand the airport's capacity and modernize its infrastructure. Its geometrical shape takes inspiration from the Damascus sword. Terminal 3 will be built adjacent to the current Terminal 1, utilizing the existing runway and apron infrastructure.

The third terminal is intended to increase the capacity of the airport to 31 million passengers per year.

== Airlines and destinations ==
The following airlines operate regular scheduled and charter flights to and from Damascus:

Airlines	Destinations
Aegean Airlines	Athens (begins 2 December 2026)
Air Arabia	Abu Dhabi, Sharjah
Air Cairo	Cairo (to be launched), Hurghada (to be launched)
AJet	Ankara, Istanbul–Sabiha Gökçen
Dan Air	Bucharest–Otopeni
EgyptAir	Cairo (begins 4 December 2026)
Etihad Airways	Abu Dhabi
Eurowings	Berlin (begins 16 December), Düsseldorf (begins 16 December), Hamburg (begins 16 December), Stuttgart (begins 16 December)
Flyadeal	Jeddah, Riyadh
Fly Cham	Abu Dhabi, Baghdad, Dammam, Dubai–International, Erbil, Istanbul–Sabiha Gökçen, Jeddah, Kuwait City, Medina, Muscat, Sharjah, Tripoli–Mitiga
FlyErbil	Erbil (resumes 2 December 2026)
Flydubai	Dubai–International
Flynas	Dammam, Jeddah, Medina, Riyadh
Jazeera Airways	Kuwait City
Kuwait Airways	Kuwait City
LEAV Aviation	Cologne/Bonn (begins 5 December 2026), Düsseldorf, Munich (begins 1 December 2026)
Qatar Airways	Doha
Royal Jordanian	Amman–Queen Alia
SalamAir	Muscat
Sundair	Berlin
SunExpress	Antalya, İzmir
Syrian Airlines	Abu Dhabi, Aleppo,Amsterdam, Berlin, Cairo (begins 5 December 2026),Copenhagen, Dammam, Deir ez-Zor, Doha, Dubai–International, Istanbul, Jeddah, Kuwait City, Medina, Moscow–Sheremetyevo, Munich, Riyadh,Sharjah, Tripoli–Mitiga, Vienna
Turkish Airlines	Istanbul

Damascus International Airport passenger destinations map (16 November 2026)

== Traffic and statistics ==
Historical statistics for Damascus International Airport are shown in the table below:

Traffic by calendar year
	Passenger volume
2004	3,200,000
2010	5,500,000
2011	1,430,000
2017	17,564
2025	1,392,699

== Ground transportation ==
=== Motorway ===
Located 30 kilometers (20 miles) southeast of Damascus, the airport is in the governorate of Rif Dimashq. The facility is connected to the city by the M5 motorway.

=== Bus ===
A shuttle bus runs between the city center and the airport. The bus ride takes approximately 30 minutes.

Royal Jordanian operates ground bus services from Damascus International Airport to Amman's Queen Alia International Airport.

=== Railway ===
The building of a railway line and a terminal bus station with a shopping center at the airport is planned to connect it to the Hejaz station.

== Accidents and incidents ==
- On 20 August 1975, ČSA Flight 540 crashed while on approach to Damascus International Airport. Out of the 128 passengers and crew on board, there were only two survivors.
- On 20 September 2012, Syrian Arab Airlines Flight 501, operated by an Airbus A320-232, was struck by a Syrian Air Force Mil Mi-17 helicopter, with the helicopter's rotor removing half of the airliner's vertical tail. The airliner successfully landed back at the airport, while the helicopter crashed, killing four crew members.

== See also ==
- Transport in Syria
- List of airports in Syria
