= Fly Cham =

Syrian airline

IATA	ICAO	Call sign
XH	FYC	CHAM SKY
- Founded: May 2025
- Commenced operations: 11 June 2025
- Hubs: Damascus International Airport
- Secondary hubs: Aleppo International Airport
- Focus cities: Abu Dhabi, Dubai
- Fleet size: 5
- Destinations: 10
- Headquarters: Damascus
- Key people: Moussa Boutros (CEO)
- Website: flycham.com

Fly Cham (Arabic: فلاي شام, romanized: Falāy Shām) is a private Syrian airline based in Damascus. The airline was founded by a Syrian-Emirati joint venture in May 2025 and operates from Damascus International Airport and Aleppo International Airport.

== History ==
=== Founding ===
In May 2025, a group of Syrian and Emirati investors announced the founding of Fly Cham. The airline was established as part of a joint investment initiative between Syria and the UAE. The airline was formed from acquisition of Cham Wings Airlines, which ceased operations on 5 June 2025. Cham Wings Airlines was acquired by Emirati company Rawdat Al Reef Project Services LLC and the Syrian company Rawdat Al Reef Project Management Services LLC as a partner. The new owners launched a rebranded carrier, Fly Cham, following Syrian regulatory approval.

Most of Cham Wings Airlines employees, cabin crew, and pilots maintained their similar position in the new company Fly Cham.

On 11 June 2025, Fly Cham launched its inaugural flight from Damascus International Airport to Abu Dhabi, United Arab Emirates.

=== Expansion ===
On 28 August 2025, the airline launched five weekly flights between Damascus International Airport and Sharjah International Airport and two weekly flights between Aleppo International Airport and Sharjah International Airport.

On 6 September 2025, flights to and from its first Turkish airport of Cukurova International Airport was launched. Initially planned for Tuesdays and Saturdays, flights from Damascus are available every Wednesday and Saturday and flights from Mersin to Damascus are available every Wednesday and Sunday.

== Destinations ==
As of December 2025, Fly Cham operates flights to the following destinations:

Country	City	Airport	Notes	Refs
Armenia	Yerevan	Zvartnots International Airport		
Germany	Düsseldorf	Düsseldorf Airport	Begins 17 November 2026	
Iraq	Baghdad	Baghdad International Airport		
Iraq	Erbil	Erbil International Airport		
Kuwait	Kuwait City	Kuwait International Airport		
Libya	Tripoli	Mitiga International Airport		
Oman	Muscat	Muscat International Airport		
Saudi Arabia	Dammam	King Fahd International Airport		
Saudi Arabia	Jeddah	King Abdulaziz International Airport	Begins 1 November 2026	
Saudi Arabia	Medina	Prince Mohammad bin Abdulaziz International Airport	Begins 4 November 2026	
Syria	Aleppo	Aleppo International Airport	Hub	
Syria	Damascus	Damascus International Airport	Hub	
Turkey	Istanbul	Sabiha Gökçen International Airport		
Turkey	Mersin	Çukurova International Airport		
United Arab Emirates	Abu Dhabi	Abu Dhabi International Airport		
United Arab Emirates	Dubai	Dubai International Airport		
United Arab Emirates	Sharjah	Sharjah International Airport		

== Fleet ==
The Fly Cham fleet comprises the following aircraft as of June 2025:

Fly Cham fleet
Aircraft	In service	Orders	Passengers			Notes/sources
Aircraft	In service	Orders	B	E	Total	Notes/sources
Airbus A320-200	4	—				
Total	4	—				
