= Syrian Airlines =

Flag carrier airline of Syria

Syrian Airlines السورية للطيران

- A Syrian Airlines Airbus A320
IATA	ICAO	Call sign
RB	SYR	SYRIANAIR
- Founded: 1946; 80 years ago (as Syrian Airways)
- Commenced operations: June 1947; 79 years ago
- Hubs: Damascus; Aleppo
- Frequent-flyer program: SyrianAir Frequent Flyer
- Alliance: Arab Air Carriers' Organization
- Fleet size: 14
- Destinations: 20
- Parent company: Government of Syria (100%)
- Headquarters: Yusuf al-Azma Square, Damascus, Syria
- Employees: 5325 (2010)
- Website: syrian-airlines.net

Syrian Airlines (Arabic: السورية للطيران) is the flag carrier of Syria. It primarily operates in the Middle East, though the airline had operated scheduled international services to several destinations in Asia, Europe and Africa prior to the Arab Spring and the subsequent Syrian civil war, previously serving over 50 destinations worldwide. Its main base is Damascus International Airport, and formerly had a base at Aleppo International Airport. The company has its head office in the Social Insurance Building in Damascus.

== History ==
=== Early years: Syrian Airways (1946–1958) ===
Syrian Airways was established in 1946, with two propeller aircraft and started to fly between a domestic networks such as Damascus, Aleppo, Deir ez-Zor, Palmyra and Qamishli. The airline started its operations in June 1947 using two Beechcraft Model 18s and three Douglas DC-3 (C-47 Dakota). The Dakotas had been acquired from Pan American World Airways, which provided technical assistance to Syrian Airways during the first years of operation.

Syrian Airways also operated a regional network, with flights to Beirut, Baghdad, Jerusalem, Amman; followed by Cairo, Kuwait, Doha and Jeddah. The airline expanded during the next years to include Beirut, Baghdad, and Jerusalem, then Cairo, Kuwait and Doha, in addition to flights during the hajj.

Financial difficulties and the 1948 Arab–Israeli War led to the withdrawal of PAA and caused the suspension of service until mid-1951. The operation was resumed after receiving government support in 1952. In 1952, the airline was provided with three Douglas DC-3s and with four Douglas DC-4s in 1954, and in 1957 it received four Douglas DC-6s in the name of United Arab Airline.

On December 21, 1953, one of the airline's Douglas planes crashed near Damascus killing all nine aboard. The airline's operating permit was cancelled following the crash. The airline was allowed to fly again in 1954. The Model 18s had been returned to the Syrian Air Force in 1949, while four additional Dakotas were acquired between 1952 and 1956.

One of the older Dakotas (YK-AAE) crashed during its climb out of Aleppo's Nayrab Airport on February 24, 1956, during a heavy storm. The 19 people on board died in the airline's worst accident to date. Newer and stronger planes were consequently added to the fleet in the mid-fifties: two Douglas DC-4/C-54 Skymaster, followed by a Douglas DC-4-1009 acquired from Swissair in December 1958, complementing an active fleet of four Douglas C47 Dakotas. The network was expanded to Dhahran in the Persian Gulf while frequencies were reinforced elsewhere.

=== Merger with Misrair: United Arab Airlines (1958–1961) ===
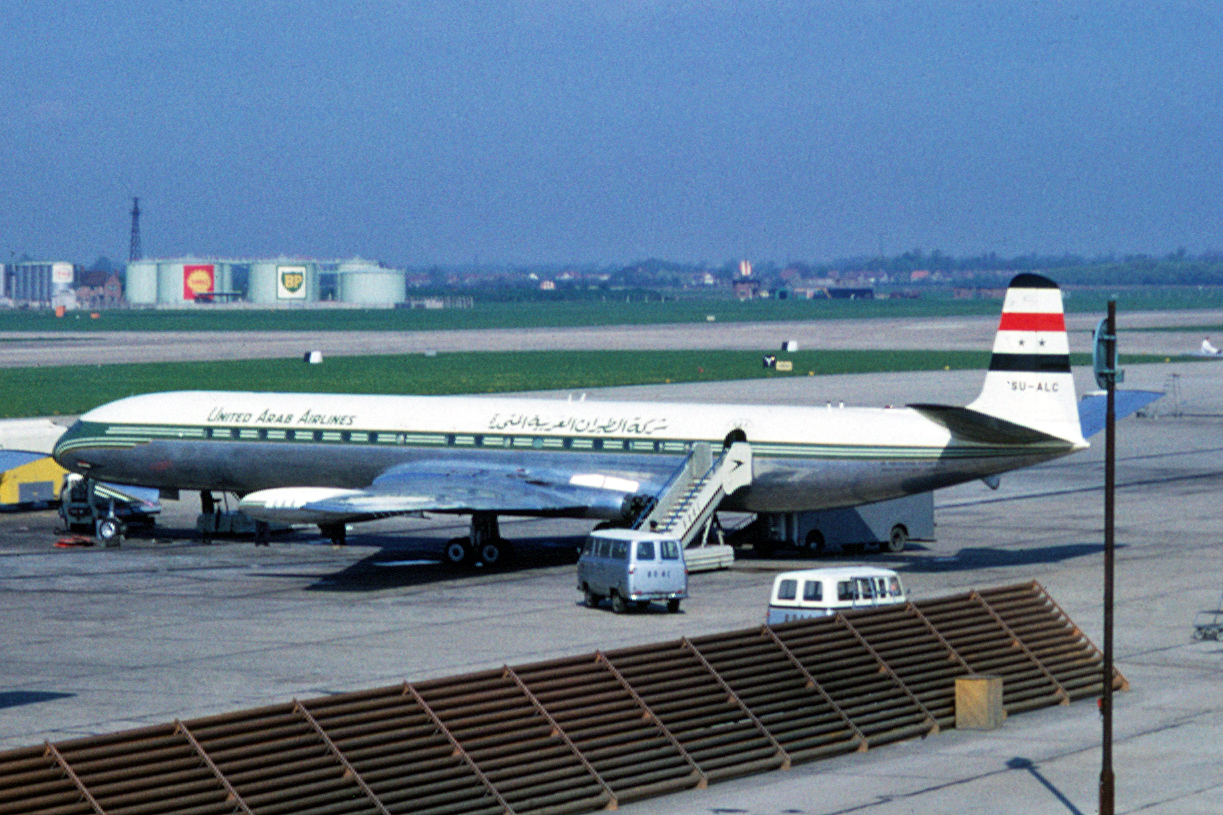
A de Havilland DH.106 Comet of United Arab Airlines in 1960, before Syria withdrew from the UAR.

In February 1958, Syria and Egypt decided to unite under the leadership of president Gamal Abdel Nasser, and the two countries became provinces of the United Arab Republic (UAR). The merger between Syrian Airways and Misrair, the state-owned airlines of Syria and Egypt came as a consequence of this political union. The airlines merged on December 25, 1958, to form United Arab Airlines (UAA). At the time of the merger, Syrian Airways was still only a small regional airline while its Egyptian counterpart, Misrair, was the largest and oldest airline in the Arab world, operating an extensive network out of Cairo, the region's metropolis.

During the UAA interlude, only regional and domestic routes were operated in Syria, flights further afield connected at the Cairo hub. Two planes inherited from Syrian Airways were written off between 1959 and 1961: the Douglas DC-4-1009 which was ditched in the Congo River as it was carrying cargo from Accra to Leopoldville on September 1, 1960, and a Dakota which crashed on its final approach of Qamishli on a domestic flight from Aleppo on May 6, 1961. Fortunately, there were no fatalities in either accident.

The union between Egypt and Syria ended on September 26, 1961, amidst tensions between the leaderships of the two provinces of the UAR. The Syrian Arab Republic was declared in Syria, while Egypt chose to continue to carry the title of UAR until 1971. In parallel to that divorce, Syria withdrew from UAA. All the airliners previously owned by Syrian Airways, two Douglas DC-6Bs and one Douglas DC6B freighter were given up by UAA to the Syrian authorities.

=== Syrian Arab Airlines (1961–1969) ===
Syrian Arab Airlines (SAAL) was founded in October 1961 to take over UAA's operations in Syria and to become the new national airline. The fleet initially consisted of three Douglas C-47 Dakotas, two Douglas C-54 Skymasters, two Douglas DC-6Bs and one Douglas DC-6B freighter (later sold to LAC Colombia). Domestic and regional flights were promptly resumed and the fleet originally was painted in a green livery reminiscent of that of the Syrian Airways colors.

SAAL purchased a third DC-6B from SAS in November 1962. Flights to European destinations (Rome and Munich) were started in 1963, followed by flights to London and Paris (Le Bourget), Karachi and Delhi in 1964. A new livery was introduced then, with alternating dark blue and red stripes for the cheatline.

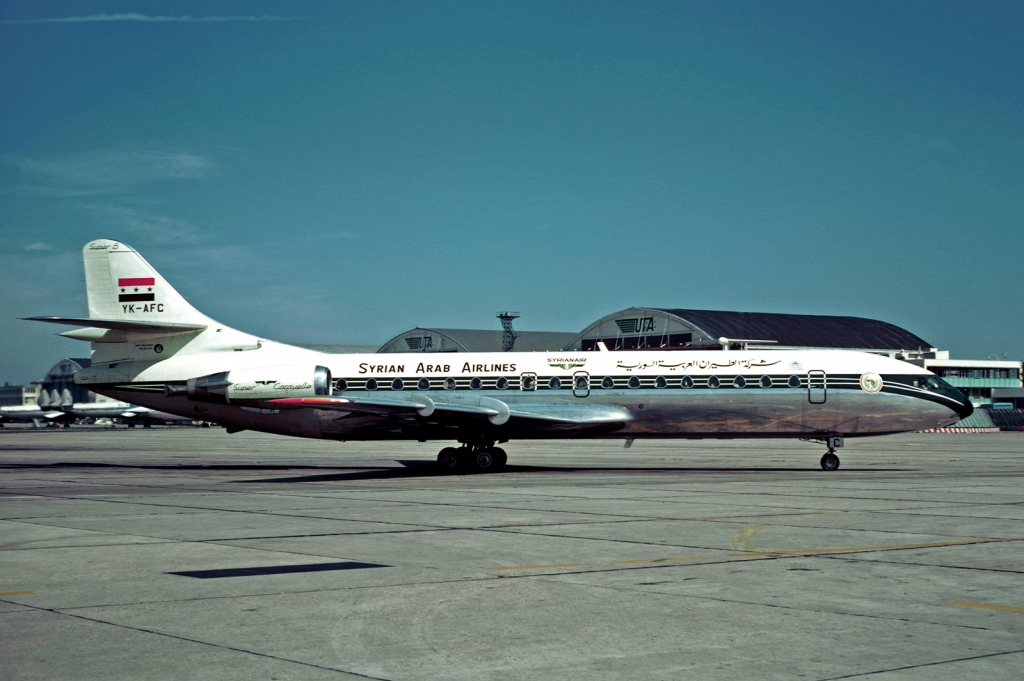
A Sud Aviation SE-210 Caravelle in the very first livery.

Syrian Arab Airlines became a founding member of the Arab Air Carriers' Organization (AACO) and entered the jet age in 1965, with the purchase of two Sud Aviation 210 Super-Caravelle 10B3s. These jets enabled the airline to expand and reinforce its network with the addition of flights to Luxembourg, Prague, Athens, Istanbul, Teheran and Bahrain. A slightly altered livery was introduced for the occasion, removing the parallel stripes from the fin and removing the red stripes from the cheatline. In 1966, a pool partnership with Middle East Airlines – Air Liban was signed and a twice-daily rotation between Beirut and Damascus was launched. The summer 1966 timetable below clearly reflects the airline's growth and modernization.

In 1966, Syrian Arab Airlines used the Caravelles on flights to Europe (London, Paris, Munich, Rome, Athens and Nicosia) as well as high-density Middle Eastern routes (Baghdad, Teheran, Jeddah, Kuwait, Doha, Sharjah) and on flights to South Asia (Karachi and Delhi). Luxembourg was a rare destination for carriers in the Middle East in the 1960s; in addition to cargo, SAAL flights could be linked to Loftleidir's budget flights to North America. In 1967, SAAL joined IATA by which it was granted the serial number 70. The Dakotas and Skymasters were gradually withdrawn from the fleet, while the DC6-Bs were used for domestic and a few short-haul regional flights.

The Six-Day War disrupted S.A.A.L's operations for several weeks in 1967 and the airline had to suspend its flights to Jerusalem. Beyond these immediate consequences on the airline, Syria's military defeat in 1967 left the whole country in a state of shock and had a decisive impact on the evolution of its political system for years to come. Nevertheless, S.A.A.L's operations were gradually restored and a normal level of operation was recovered by 1968 as shown in the timetable below. The fleet consisted then of two Super Caravelles and three DC-6Bs.

=== Syrian Airlines (1970–1980) ===
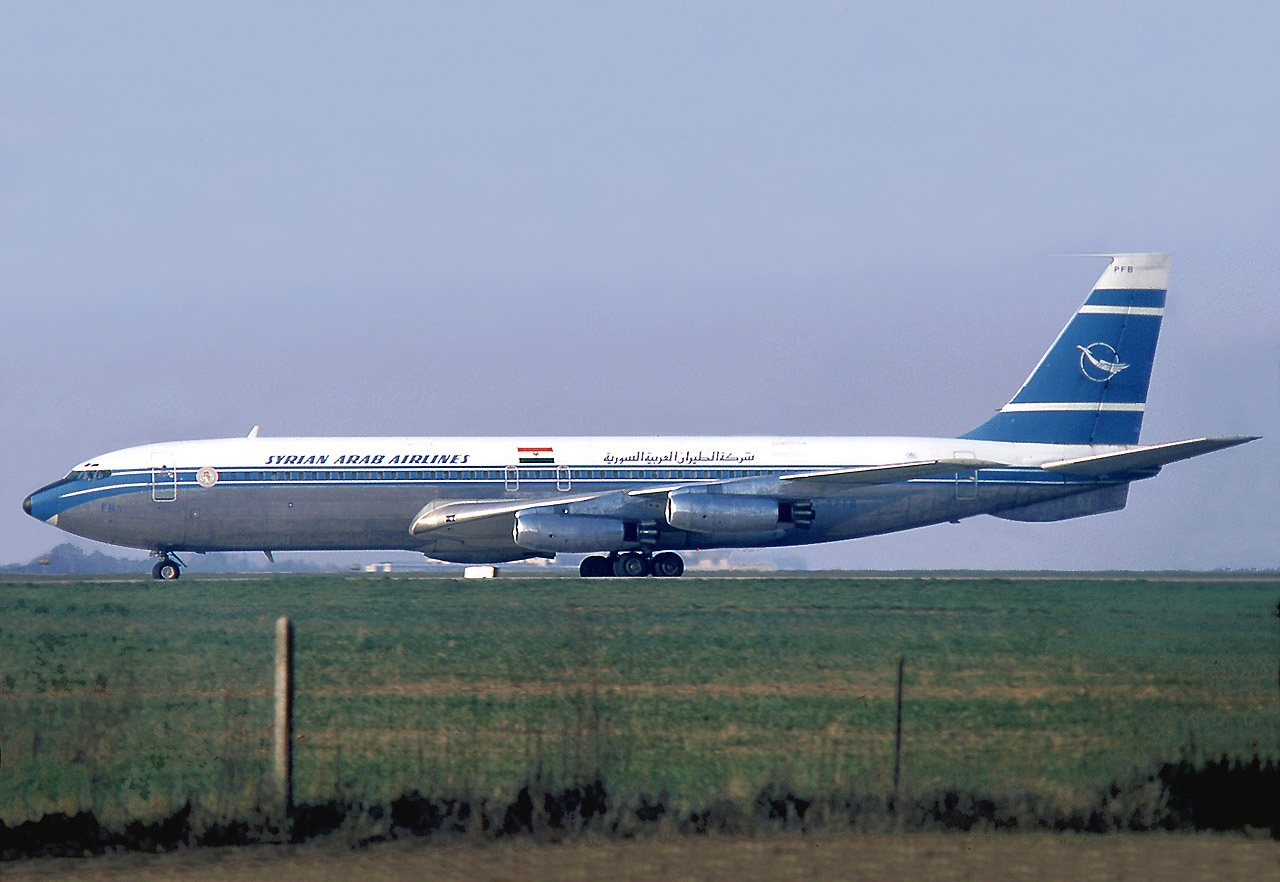
A leased Boeing 707-400 at Paris-Le Bourget Airport in 1975.

With the beginning of the seventies, S.A.A.L continued its steady development by introducing flights to Moscow in 1970 and purchasing another two Super Caravelles from Sterling Airways in June 1971. Frequencies were increased, and flights to Jeddah were resumed the same year while new flights were launched to Abu Dhabi, Benghazi and Budapest. Flights were disrupted for several weeks during the 1973 Yom Kippur War.

A new airport, the Damascus International Airport, was built 25 km south-east of the capital and was opened to traffic in 1973 to become S.A.A.L's modern hub, replacing the old Mezze structure inherited from the French mandate.

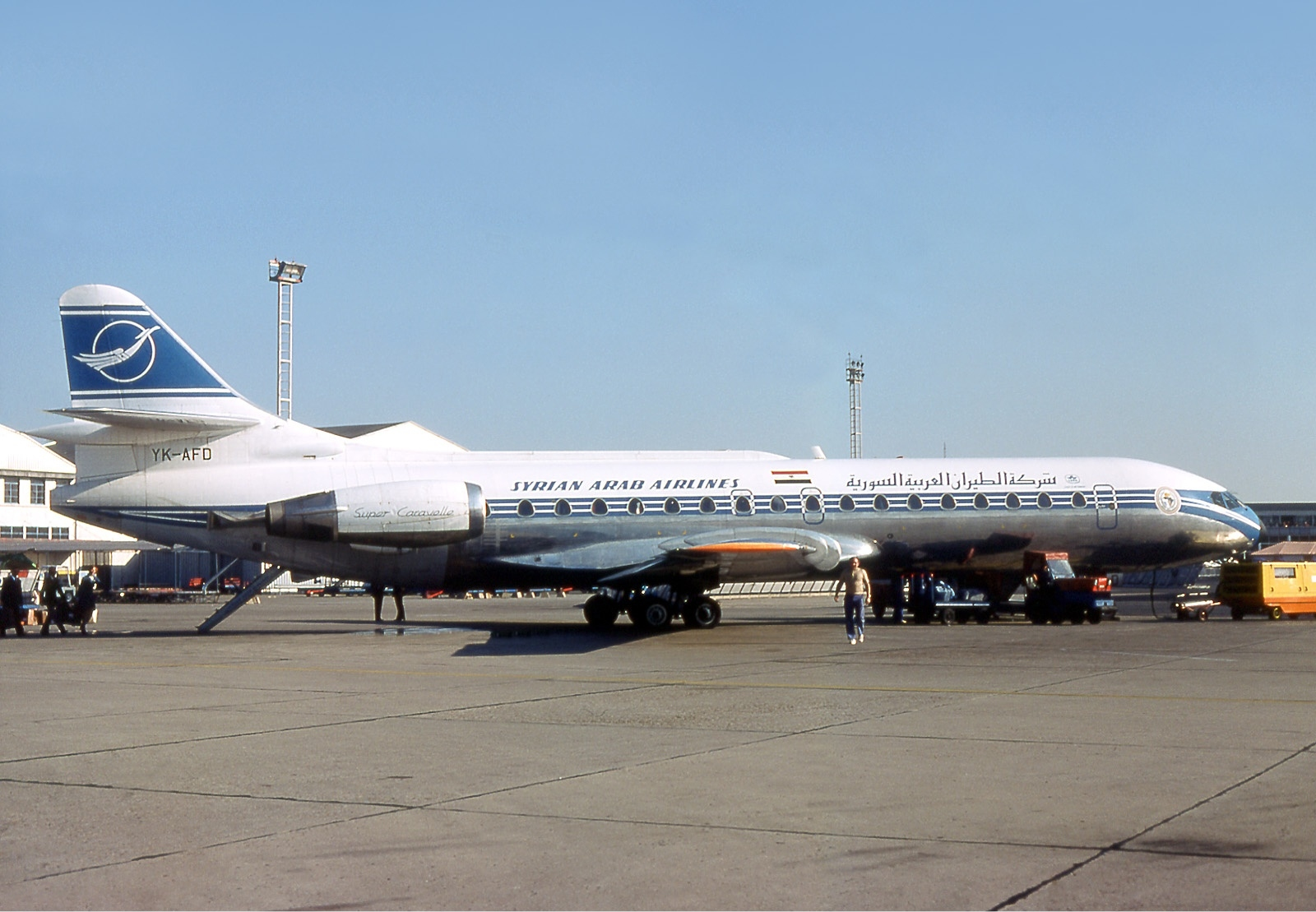
A Sud Aviation SE-210 Caravelle in post-1973 livery.

A climate of confidence, pragmatism and political stability was nevertheless in sight in Syria after decades of volatile politics and coups d'état. Ambitious development programs were launched throughout the country.

Syrian Arab Airlines was among the government's priorities as a new modernization and expansion program was launched. A new SAAL livery was introduced in 1973, featuring the airline's new logo, a mythical bird rising over a Mediterranean-blue disk.

Closer economic and political ties with the Warsaw Pact countries led to the progressive buildup of a comprehensive network in Eastern Europe, with the addition of Bucharest–Otopeni, Prague–Ruzyně and Berlin–Schoenefeld. More flights to North Africa were added in 1974 with the introduction of Tripoli, Tunis, Algiers and Casablanca. Sanaa was also added to the network in 1974.

In parallel to that, SAAL was managing an increasing number of Soviet-built aircraft for the Syrian government and the Syrian Air Force. That fleet was gradually expanded to include two Antonov An-24s, six Antonov An-26s, six Yakovlev Yak-40s and four Ilyushin Il-76 freighters (2Il-76Ts, 2 Il76Ms), in addition to two French-built Dassault Mystere Falcon 20Fs and one Dassault Falcon 900.

These aircraft were not used by the airline for scheduled services except for some of the Yak-40s which replaced the Douglas DC-6B and the Caravelles on domestic routes by the early eighties. In 1974, two Boeing 707s were leased in from British Airtours to complement the Caravelle fleet. That year, the airline carried 279,866 passengers.

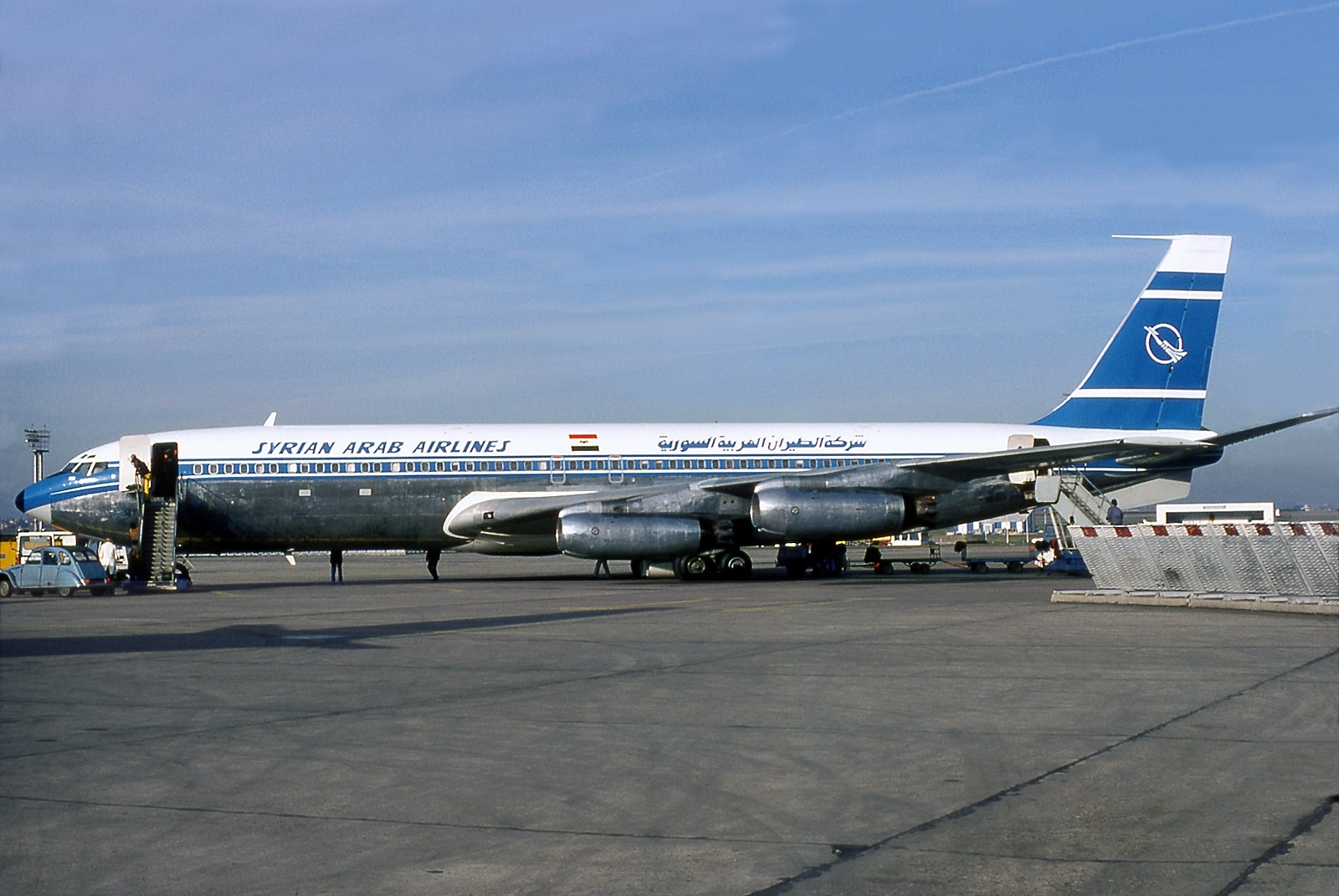
A leased Boeing 707-300 at Paris-Le Bourget Airport.

A fleet renewal program was launched in 1975 as SAAL ordered three brand-new Boeing 727-294s and two Boeing 747SPs. Awaiting the delivery of its new planes, the airline leased Boeing 707s to improve its service offer. In all, two Boeing 707-420s and six Boeing 707-320s were leased in (respectively from British Airtours and British Midland Airways) at various times between 1974 and 1976 and were used to reinforce frequencies and add new destinations to the network.

The SyrianAir styling was officially adopted on November 11, 1975, in anticipation of the delivery of the new Boeing fleet and to generate a more modern and international image. However, SyrianAir's official and legal title continued to be Syrian Arab Airlines.

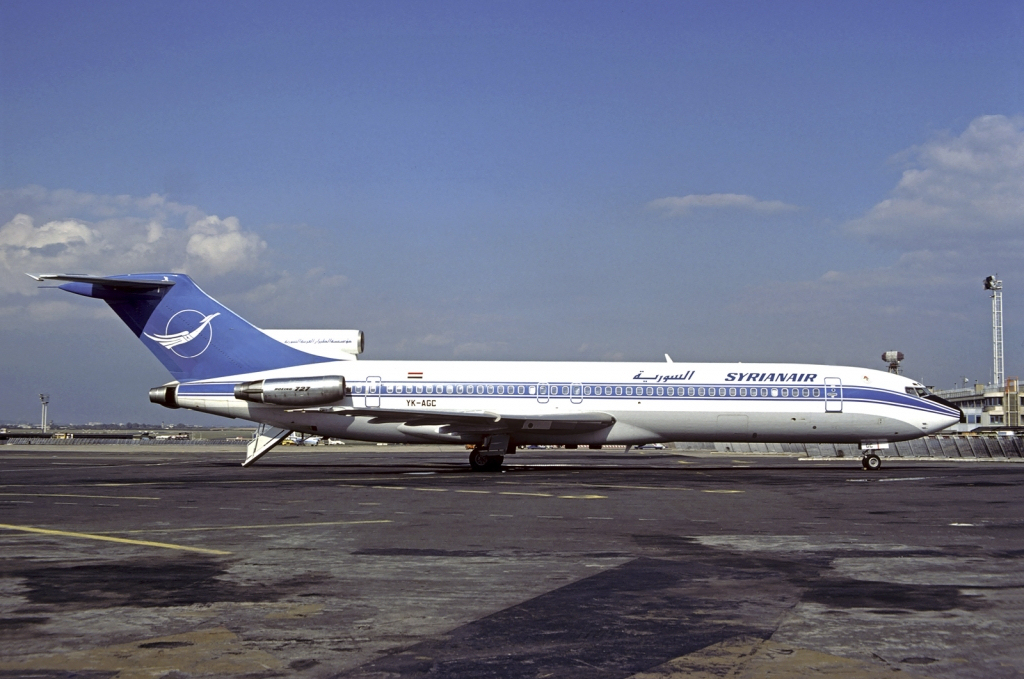
A Boeing 727-200 at Paris-Le Bourget Airport in 1976.

The Boeing 727s supplemented the Caravelles throughout the network, while the Boeing 747SPs were used on high-load international routes (Munich, Paris, London, the Persian Gulf region, Karachi and Delhi). Demand was particularly high on these routes in 1976, especially following the repeated closures of the Beirut International Airport, and the increasing number of passengers using Damascus International Airport for travel to and from neighboring and war-stricken Lebanon. A record 480,000 passengers were carried by the airline in 1976.

The two jumbo jets were ordered in 1976 to operate transatlantic services to New York City. SyrianAir and the Royal Jordanian Airlines were to join forces in launching the first transatlantic route ever operated by an Arab Middle Eastern airline. The joint flight agreement never really materialized, and Alia launched independently its own Amman-New York flights in 1977. SyrianAir started its Boeing 747SP operations on June 1, 1976, using the jumbo jet on the Damascus-Munich-London sector.

During the seventies, Syrianair managed to acquire a modern fleet, revamp its image and operate a profitable passenger network on three continents largely satisfying the needs of the Syrian market. Its fares were accessible and attracted budget travellers flying between Europe and South Asia. The climate of stability and economic prosperity in Syria had a determining influence on the positive results of the airline. The eighties brought about new challenges to both, Syria and its airline.

=== 1980–1993 ===
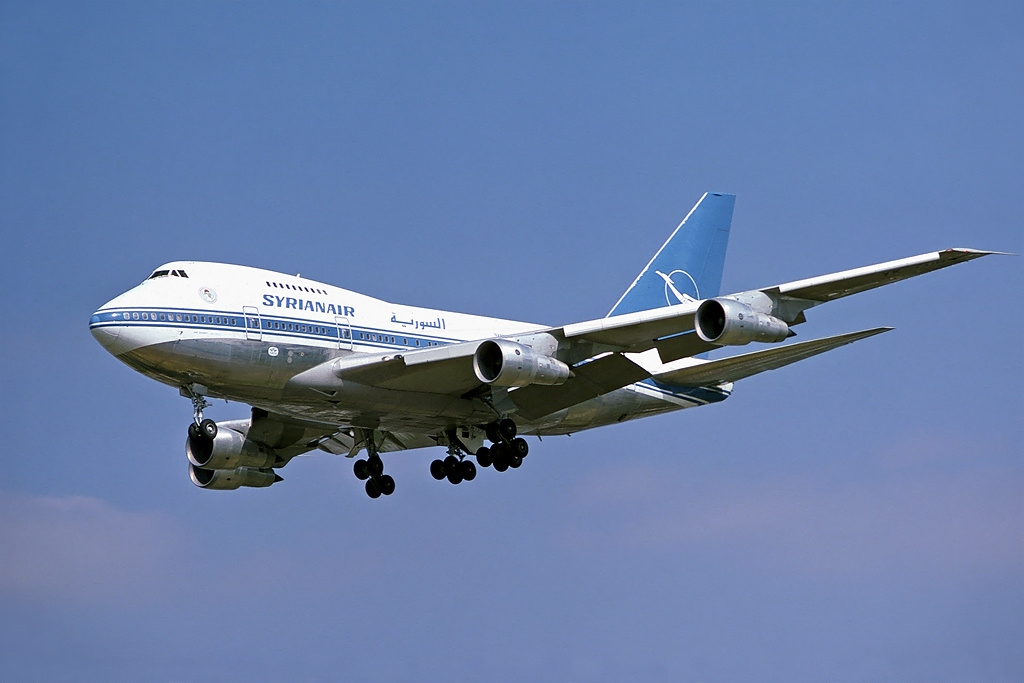
A landing Boeing 747SP in 1978.

During the start of the 1980s, Syrian Air had an active fleet of three Boeing 727s, two Boeing 747SPs, and two ageing Super Caravelles. In 1980, SyrianAir sold the Caravelles as plans were made for the acquisition of newer aircraft. In 1981, the airline carried 510,000 passengers, but these numbers declined to 462,000 in 1982 following the unrest caused by the 1982 Lebanon War. The Yakovlev Yak 40s devoted to internal routes were mostly flown on behalf of the Syrian Air Force.

While there was an obvious need to renew the fleet and increase the airline's capacity, mounting tensions between Syria and the West hampered the airline's modernization plans. There was a growing rift between the U.S. administration in particular and Syria; both parties found themselves often at odds regarding a variety of regional issues, from the Iranian revolution, the Palestinian cause, to the raging conflict in Lebanon and Iran–Iraq War.

These tensions ultimately resulted in economic sanctions voted by the U.S Congress, which accused Syria of harbouring and embracing illegal opposition movements. The sanctions, which became effective in the early eighties, apart from harming Syria's economy in general, prevented SyrianAir from buying newer Western equipment. This climate of difficult economics also resulted in a relatively austere on-board service and in the persistence of tedious multiple-leg routings, while competing airlines were offering nonstop frequent flights.

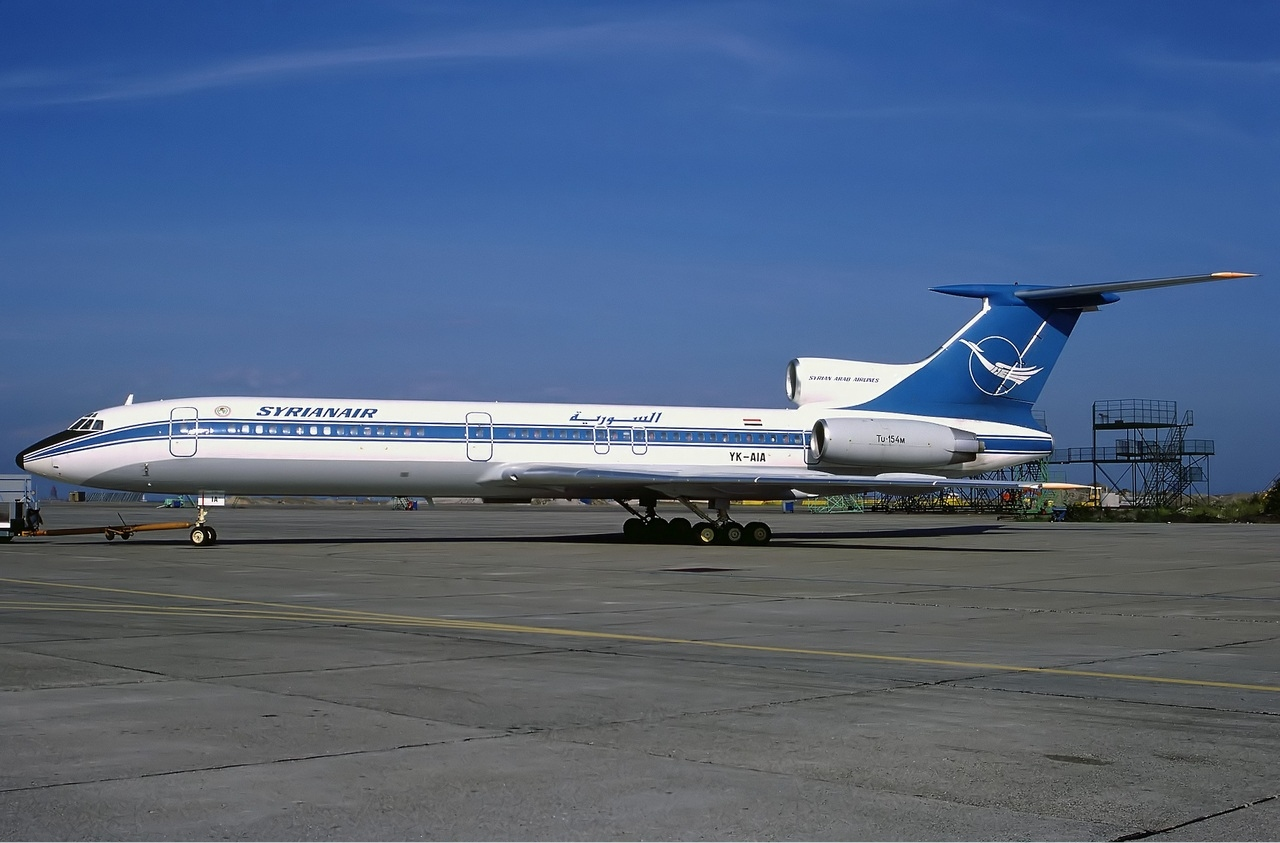
A Tupolev Tu-154, acquired from the Soviet Union in 1984.

SyrianAir had ultimately to resort to Soviet-built aircraft to expand its fleet. The Tupolev Tu-134s were introduced in 1983. In all, six Tu-134s were bought by SyrianAir, including two devoted to governmental missions. The Tu-134s were used along with the Caravelles on low-yield regional and medium-haul flights and some domestic routes, while most of the domestic flights continued to be operated using the Yakovlev Yak-40s. Three Tupolev Tu-154Ms were acquired by SyrianAir between 1984 and 1986, they provided a well-needed boost to the Boeing 727 operations in Europe and the Persian Gulf region. The same difficult summer of 1985, flights to Beirut were restarted using the Super Caravelles.

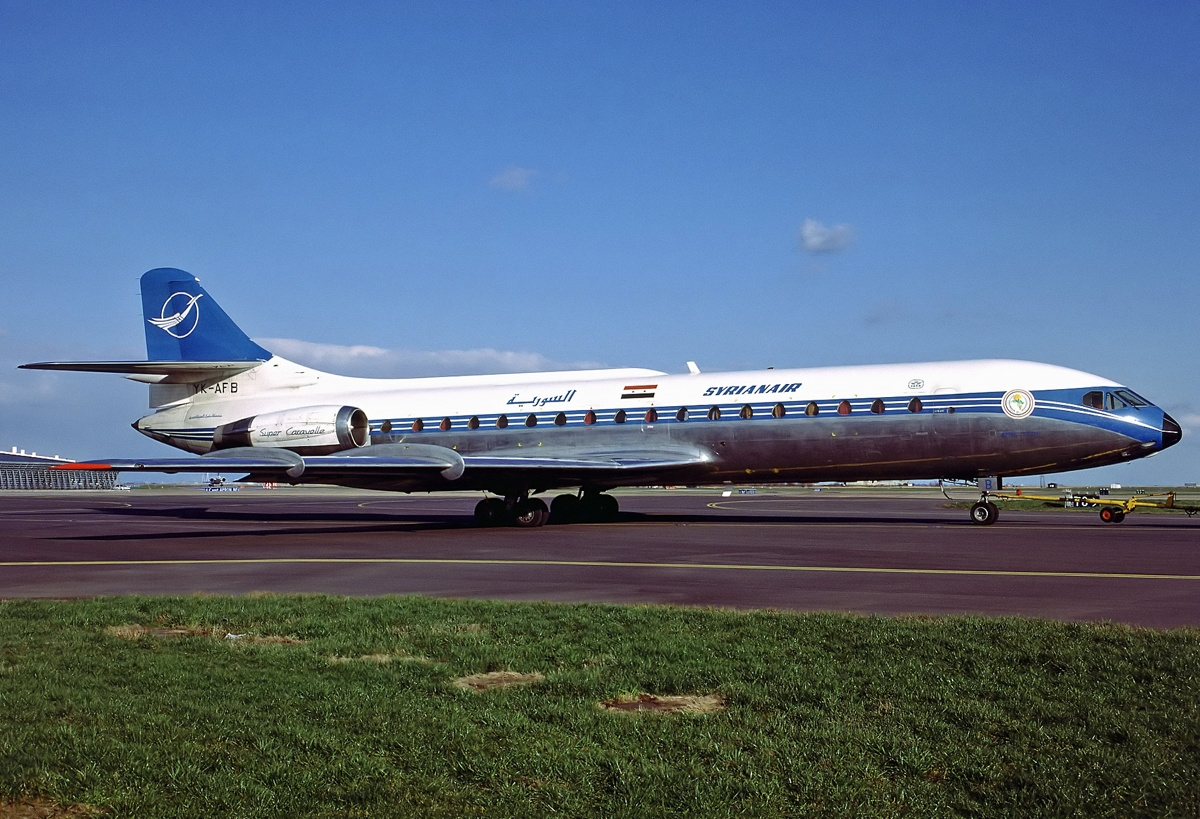
A Super Caravelle, which was returned to service in the mid-1980s on shorter routes.

In 1986, SyrianAir had to suspend flights to one of its long-standing and most important destinations, London, because of a diplomatic crisis between the UK and Syria following the Hindawi affair. The number of passengers carried by SyrianAir declined to 353,355 in 1988, the lowest since the mid-seventies, forcing the airline towards more reform. The workforce was reduced by 1.5% to 3,526 in 1989, the number of passengers carried that year increased to 509,659. The workforce was increased to 3,615 in 1990, and the number of passengers increased to 655,644, a record despite the war in Kuwait, and the airline was able to finish the year without losses.

While sanctions and harsh economics kept it lagging way behind its competitors, and while the demise of the Soviet Union cast doubts on the future of its Tupolev fleet, SyrianAir's fortunes changed following the Gulf War in 1990. As Syria supported the U.S.-led coalition against the Iraqi invasion of Kuwait, it regained some of its long-lost sympathy in Western hearts. Flights to London were resumed in 1991, and passenger numbers continued to increase to 700,819. The long-standing U.S. sanctions were eased in 1993, allowing the acquisition of modern Western equipment.

=== Modernization (1994–2010) ===
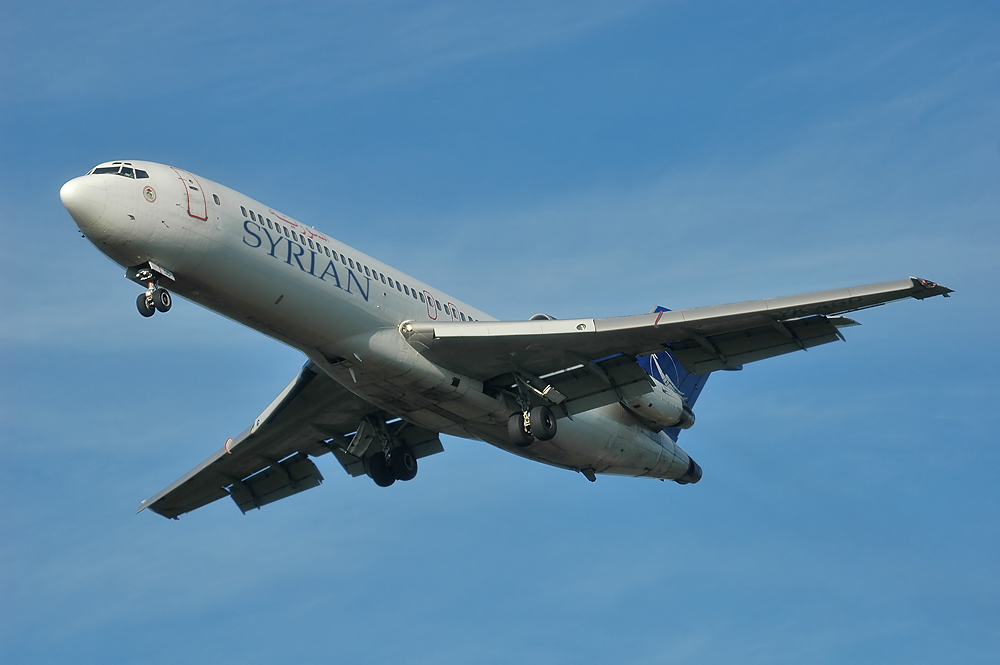
Boeing 727-200 Advanced

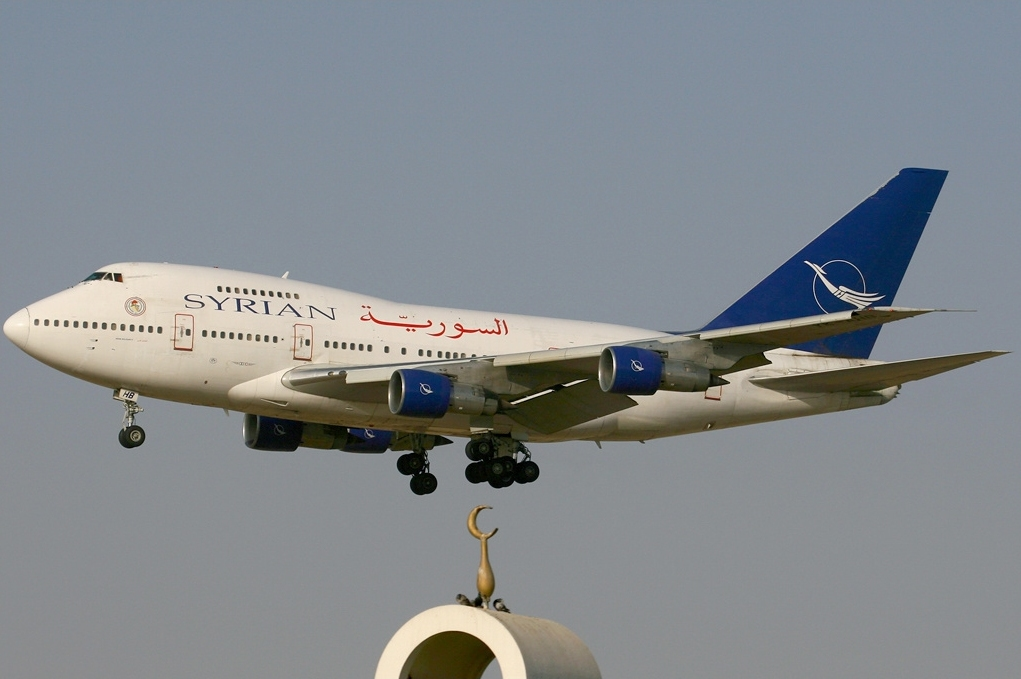
Boeing 747SP

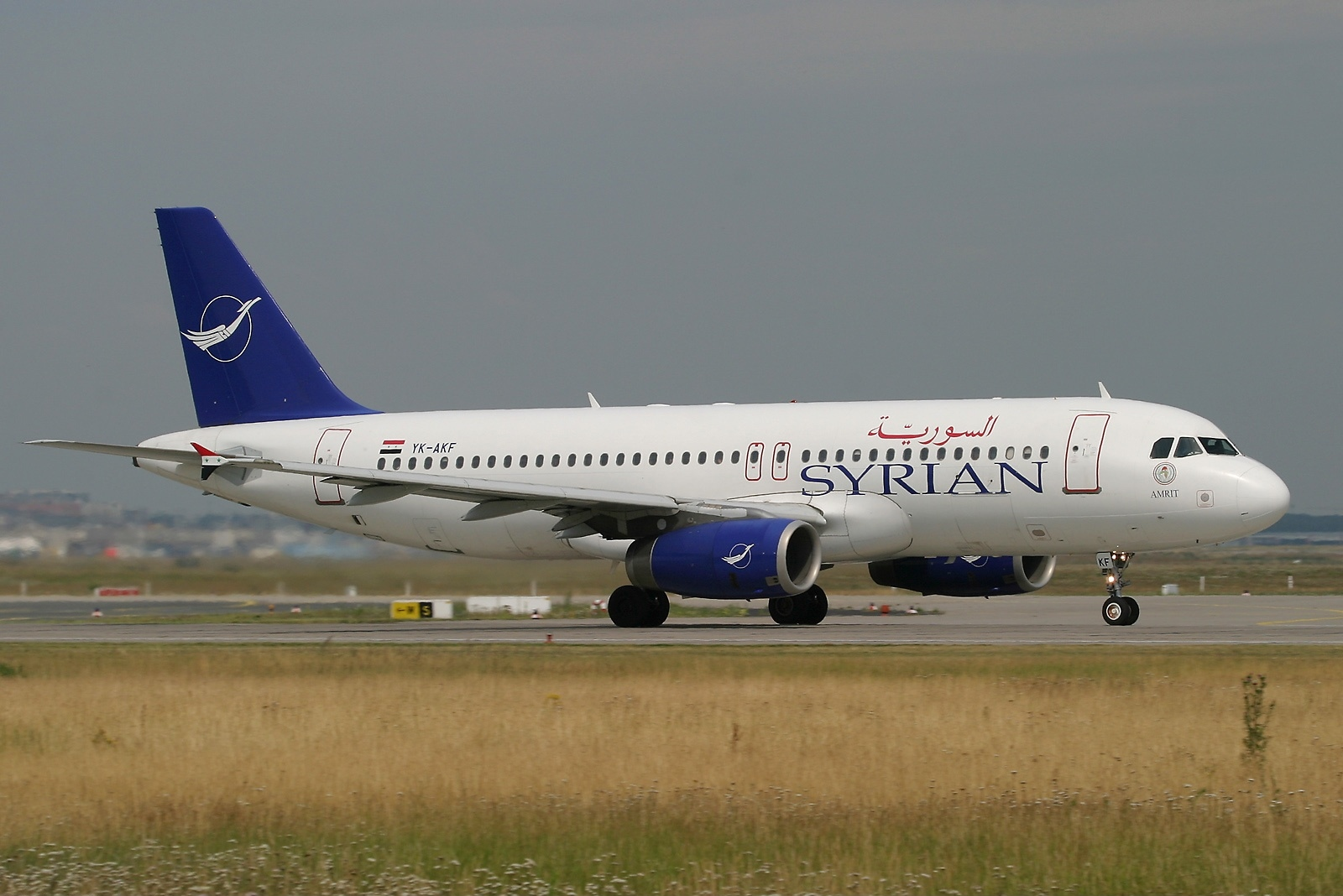
Airbus A320-232 "Amrit"

In 1994, Kuwait donated to Syria three Boeing 727-269s which enabled SyrianAir to finally phase out the two Caravelles in December of the following year. In 1995, a record 71 million dollars in operating profit was reported by the airline. The Tupolev operations were gradually scaled down, while new destinations (Madrid and Stockholm) were launched. In 1997, the airline took drastic measures in reducing its workforce to 2,331, as operating profits had declined to 44 million USD during the previous year.

By 1998, the Tupolev Tu-134 was restricted to the Budapest, Beirut, Kuwait, Deir ez-Zor and Qamishly sectors while the Tu-154s were still flown to Bucharest, Moscow, Istanbul, Cairo and Aleppo. In October 1998, SyrianAir received its first Airbus A320-232, YK-AKA and a new livery was unveiled for the occasion. Six Airbus A320s were delivered to SyrianAir in all, allowing the withdrawal of the Tupolevs from regular service by 2000. The Tupolev Tu-134 (except for YK-AYE, YK-AYB and YK-AYF maintained for government use) as well as the Caravelles were stored by the airline at Damascus International Airport. In 1999, flights between Aleppo and Beirut were inaugurated (no such flights had been carried out since the sixties) and service to Libya was resumed following the removal of the UN sanctions against that country.

In 2000, SyrianAir operated a fleet of 14 aircraft: six Airbus A320s, six Boeing 727s and two Boeing 747SPs, while it continued to use the Syrian Air Force Yakovlev Yak-40s for the domestic routes to Qamishly and Deirezzor. Flights to Vienna were inaugurated, while the resumption of Amman and Baghdad flights during that year would prove only temporary. According to the Syrian DGCA website, the airline carried 764,000 passengers that year. In 2003, the airline registered a 9 million dollar net profit thanks to its more economical fleet and carried 907,850 passengers. Unprofitable routes were either scrapped or downscaled for seasonal operations. Thus, flights to Teheran, Bahrain, Doha and Muscat were operated only during the summer season. New markets were sought with the addition of Milan, Barcelona, Manchester, Copenhagen and Benghazi in 2004.

With a workforce exceeding 4,000 employees, SyrianAir, whose revenues nevertheless exceeded 171 million dollars in 2003, remains over-staffed. In 2004, and despite a difficult regional situation and U.S. sanctions, the airline improved its performance, carrying 1.07 million passengers. SyrianAir carried close to 1.4 million passengers by 2005, however, the number of passengers being carried declined to less than 740,000 passengers by 2009.

=== Syrian civil war and sanctions: 2011–2024 ===
Plans were made for the renewal of the fleet with the possible acquisition of several new Airbus aircraft to replace the ageing Boeing 727 and 747s. These plans were hampered by the reinforcement of a U.S.-led embargo against Syria after the start of the conflict in Syria in 2011, and fleet renewal using Russian equipment was being reconsidered.

By 2012, Syrian Air had retired all its old Boeing 747, 727 and Tupolev aircraft, leaving SyrianAir with just eight aircraft in its fleet – two ATRs and six Airbus A320s. In 2017, the company acquired an Airbus A340-300 (YK-AZA, YK-AZB) despite sanctions.

On 23 July 2012, as the Syrian civil war continued, the European Union imposed a new wave of sanctions on Syria, which included sanctions on SyrianAir. The sanctions meant that the airline could not conduct flights to the EU, or buy any new aircraft which contained European parts. As a result, Syrian Air was forced to suspend all its operations in the EU. The company is discussing a lawsuit against European Union countries since Syrian Airlines "did not violate any laws nor did it jeopardise safety". However EU ministers justified the sanctions on the airline because the company "provides financial and logistical support for the Syrian government".

On 10 October 2012, a Syrian Air flight in Turkish airspace was flanked by two fighter jets and forced to land in the country. It was believed the plane was carrying a Russian shipment to the Syrian military. Turkey's then-Foreign Minister Ahmet Davutoğlu said that Turkey had "received information this plane was carrying cargo of a nature that could not possibly comply with the rules of civil aviation." Russian news agency Interfax cited an unnamed source from a Russian arms exporting agency who stated that there were no weapons or military equipment on board the plane.

On 9 January 2020, Syrian President Bashar al-Assad issued a legislative decree to change the name from Syrian Arab Airlines to Syrian Airlines. Two more Airbus A320-200s were delivered via Iran in July and December 2022 (reg. YK-AKG, YK-AKH).

=== Post-Ba'athist Syria: 2025–present ===
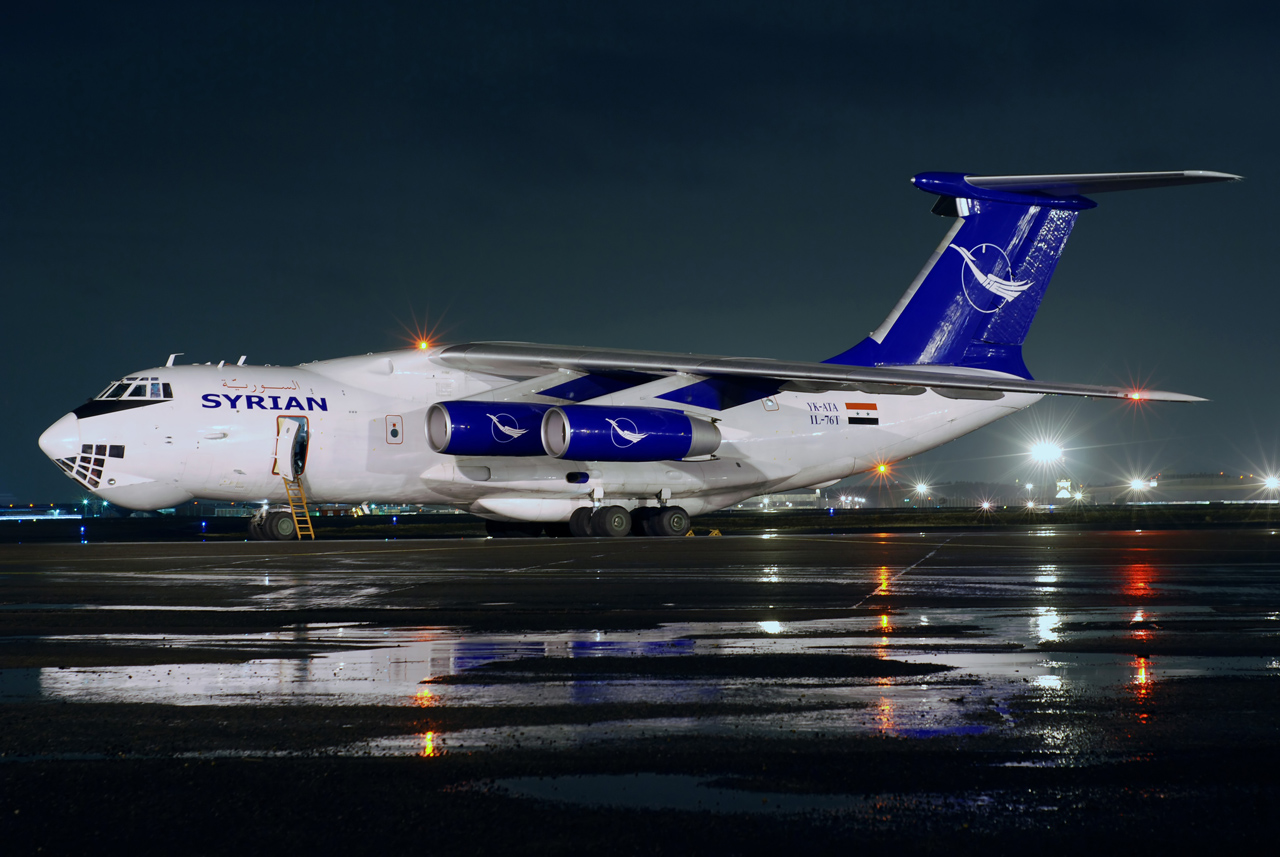
A Syrian Air Ilyushin IL-76

In February 2025, the European Union suspended transport sanctions, paving the way for Airbus purchases and flights to Europe.

As interest in Syrian economy increases post civil war, the Syrian government signed a $250 million deal in financing to buy up to 10 Airbus A320 narrow-body planes for Syrian Airlines with a consortium of companies led by Qatar's UCC Holding.

== Codeshare agreements ==
Syrian Air had codeshare agreements with the following airlines (as of April 2022):

- Conviasa

== Destinations ==
Syrian Air operates the following services (as of April 2025):

Country	City	Airport	Note	Ref
Algeria	Algiers	Houari Boumediene Airport	To be launched / Planned	
Austria	Vienna	Vienna International Airport		
Denmark	Copenhagen	Copenhagen Airport		
Egypt	Cairo	Cairo International Airport	Begins 5 December 2026	
Germany	Berlin	Berlin Brandenburg Airport		
Germany	Munich	Munich Airport		
Iraq	Baghdad	Baghdad International Airport	Suspended	
Jordan	Amman	Queen Alia International Airport	Suspended	
Kuwait	Kuwait City	Kuwait International Airport		
Lebanon	Beirut	Beirut–Rafic Hariri International Airport	Suspended	
Libya	Tripoli	Mitiga International Airport		
Netherlands	Amsterdam	Amsterdam Airport Schiphol		
Qatar	Doha	Hamad International Airport		
Russia	Moscow	Sheremetyevo International Airport		
Saudi Arabia	Dammam	King Fahd International Airport		
Saudi Arabia	Jeddah	King Abdulaziz International Airport		
Saudi Arabia	Medina	Prince Mohammad bin Abdulaziz International Airport		
Saudi Arabia	Riyadh	King Khalid International Airport		
Syria	Aleppo	Aleppo International Airport		
Syria	Damascus	Damascus International Airport	Hub	
Syria	Deir ez-Zor	Deir ez-Zor Airport		
Syria	Latakia	Latakia International Airport	Suspended	
Syria	Qamishli	Qamishli International Airport	Suspended	
Turkey	Istanbul	Istanbul Airport		
United Arab Emirates	Abu Dhabi	Zayed International Airport		
United Arab Emirates	Dubai	Dubai International Airport		
United Arab Emirates	Sharjah	Sharjah International Airport		

== Fleet ==
=== Business fleet ===
As of August 2025, Syrian Air currently operates the following aircraft:

Syrian Air fleet
Aircraft	In service	Orders	Passengers			Notes
Aircraft	In service	Orders	C	Y	Total	Notes
Airbus A320-200	11	6	12	150	162	
Airbus A340-300	2	—	20	223	243	
ATR 72-600	2	—	—	68	68	
Boeing 737-500	1	—	8	102	110	
Total	16	6				

=== Government and VIP fleet ===
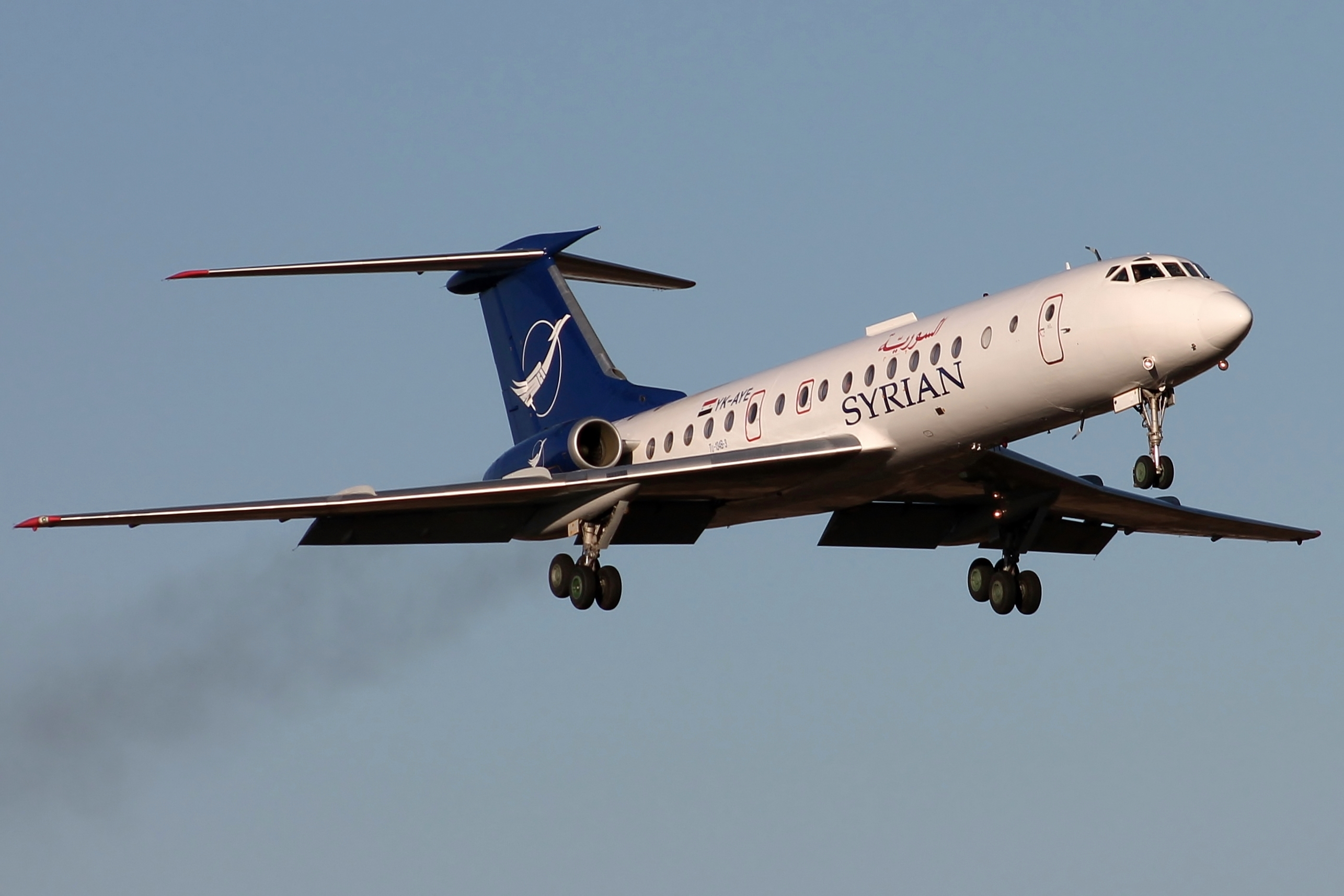
A Tupolev Tu-134 used for government purposes.

The airline had operated a Dassault Falcon 20, Dassault Falcon 900 and Tupolev Tu-134 for government VIP charters, as well as Ilyushin Il-76 military cargo aircraft, all of which are painted in Syrian Air livery. Since the fall of the Assad regime in December 2024, the current status of these aircraft are unknown; under the Syrian transitional government, all aircraft used for government purposes are directly operated by the Syrian Air Force.

Government Syrian Air fleet
Aircraft	In service	Orders	Passengers			Notes
Aircraft	In service	Orders	C	Y	Total	Notes
Dassault Falcon 20	2	—	14	—	14	Mystère 20F variant
Dassault Falcon 900	1	—	19	—	19	
Ilyushin Il-76	4	—	Cargo			
Tupolev Tu-134	3	—	—	80	80	
Yakovlev Yak-40	1	—	32	—	32	

=== Fleet development ===
Syrian Air has maintained orders for new Antonov, Ilyushin, and Tupolev aircraft. However, an order for 10 Antonov An-158 was cancelled due to the Syrian Civil War. In March 2025, the European Union lifted transport sanctions, opening the path for the repair and purchase of Airbus aircraft.

In November 2018, it was reported the airline was evaluating placing an order for 15-20 Yakovlev MC-21-300s, which it would be able to add despite US and European sanctions. The status of this evaluation is currently unknown.

=== Historical fleet ===
The airline fleet previously included the following aircraft:

- Boeing 747SP
- Douglas C-54 Skymaster

== Accidents and incidents ==
- On 24 February 1956, a Douglas D-47B Skytrain had a dual engine failure when en route between Aleppo and Damascus. The aircraft crashed in adverse weather conditions, killing all 19 occupants.
- On 7 April 1963, a Douglas DC-6, YK-AEB, lost control and crashed during take-off from Hamah Airport. One passenger from the 26 died when the plane burst into flames; the remaining 25 passengers and four crew members survived.
- On 2 October 1964, a Douglas C-54 Skymaster, YK-ADA, encountered difficulties in stopping within the remaining distance at Damascus International Airport, overran and lost its nose gear before coming to rest. There were no injuries but the aircraft was damaged beyond repair.
- On 6 February 1967, a Douglas C-47 Skytrain (DC-3), YK-ACB, struck a building, stalled and crashed a few hundred yards from the runway while on approach to Aleppo-Nejrab Airport after encountering severe weather in low visibility. Eight occupants were killed and 11 were injured. The crew descended below the glide on approach.
- On 20 September 2012, Syrian Air Flight 501 from Damascus to Latakia, operated by an Airbus A320-200, collided in mid air with a Mil Mi-17 military helicopter of the Syrian Air Force during the climb. The airliner returned to Damascus for a safe landing. Approximately half of the vertical stabilizer was broken off the A320. The helicopter crashed, killing all 4 flight crew.

== Logos ==
Logo used until 2026

Logo used from 2026

== See also ==
- General Authority of Civil Aviation (Syria)
