= General Authority of Civil Aviation (Syria) =

Civil aviation authority of Syria

- الهيئة العامة للطيران المدني

Agency overview
- Jurisdiction: Government of Syria
- Headquarters: Damascus, Syria
- Agency executive: Omar Hisham al-Hosari, President
- Website: gaca.gov.sy

The General Authority of Civil Aviation (GACA) (Arabic: الهيئة العامة للطيران المدني) is the civil aviation authority of Syria.

It is responsible for regulation of air transport services and the implementation of civil air regulations, air safety and airworthiness standards. It also co-ordinates all regulatory functions with International Civil Aviation Organization. The GACA headquarters is in Damascus.

== History ==
In January 2001, a delegation from the Syrian Civil Aviation Administration, led by Director General Hussain Mahfoud, held bilateral discussions in Damascus with the Tunisian Civil Aviation Authority, represented by Director Ezz Eldeen Lagha. The meeting aimed to review aspects of the bilateral Air Transport Agreement signed on 14 October 1975 and to address operational matters relevant to the two countries' air carriers. The accord introduced a new aviation security article and revised air route schedules, granting reciprocal rights for airlines from both countries to operate through and beyond each other's territories. It also included provisions for fifth freedom traffic rights, allowing limited operations to third countries. Both sides agreed to pursue further commercial cooperation, including code-sharing arrangements.

On 16 February 2025, a delegation from Syria's General Authority of Civil Aviation (GACA) signed a memorandum of understanding with the Qatar Civil Aviation Authority (CAA) in Doha, aimed at strengthening bilateral cooperation in the civil aviation sector. The agreement includes initiatives to enhance aviation expertise, notably the participation of Syrian pilots in advanced training programs in Doha to improve their technical and operational competencies.

On 24 March 2025, the International Civil Aviation Organization (ICAO) and Syria's GACA signed an agreement to support Syria's reintegration into the global aviation sector. The initiative seeks to modernize Syria's aviation infrastructure and capabilities to enable its safe and secure re-entry into the international air transport network.
