= EgyptAir crash =

EgyptAir crash may refer to several incidents involving EgyptAir aircraft:

- 1972: EgyptAir Flight 763 crashed approaching Aden International Airport
- 1973: EgyptAir Flight 741 crashed approaching Nicosia International Airport
- 1976: EgyptAir Flight 864 crashed into an industrial complex in Bangkok, caused by pilot error
- 1985: EgyptAir Flight 648 Hijacking
- 1999: EgyptAir Flight 990 crashed into the Atlantic off Massachusetts, USA, cause disputed
- 2002: EgyptAir Flight 843 crashed near Tunis in a storm due to pilot error
- 2016: EgyptAir Flight 804 crashed into the Mediterranean Sea as it approached Egypt from Paris
