= Flight 763 =

Flight 763 may refer to

- EgyptAir Flight 763, crashed on 19 March 1972
- Saudia Flight 763, mid-air collision on 12 November 1996
