= Flight 60 =

Flight 60 may refer to:

- All Nippon Airways Flight 60, crashed on 4 February 1966
- Biman Bangladesh Airlines Flight 60, accident on 8 May 2019
