= Flight 741 =

Flight 741 may refer to:

- TWA Flight 741, hijacked on 6 September 1970
- EgyptAir Flight 741, crashed on 29 January 1973
- Flight 741, a 1986 book in The Executioner series

== See also ==
- Flight b741, a 2024 album by King Gizzard & the Lizard Wizard
