= EgyptAir Cargo =

Egyptian cargo airline, subsidiary of EgyptAir

Egyptair Cargo
IATA	ICAO	Call sign
MS	MSX	EGYPTAIR CARGO
- Founded: 2002
- Hubs: Cairo International Airport
- Fleet size: 4
- Destinations: 11
- Parent company: Egyptair Holding Company (Government of Egypt)
- Headquarters: Cairo, Egypt
- Key people: Captain Ehab El-Tahtawi (Chairman & CEO)
- Website: www.egyptair-cargo.com

Egyptair Cargo is the cargo division of the Egyptian national airline Egyptair. It operates using both its own dedicated aircraft and the cargo-carrying capacity of its sister passenger airline. Its main base is Cairo International Airport.

== History ==
Egyptair Cargo was formed in 2002 from the existing cargo activities of Egyptair, on the creation of the Egyptair Holding Company, as one of its subsidiaries. The company participated in IATA's air-cargo quality programme, Cargo iQ (known as Cargo 2000 until its 2016 renaming).

In 2008, the airline introduced a modified logo with larger Egyptair Cargo titles. Sister company Egyptair introduced a new livery and logo later that year that was applied to the cargo fleet as well.

== Corporate affairs ==
=== Ownership and structure ===
Egyptair Cargo is a wholly owned subsidiary of Egyptair Holding Company, a state-owned company, 100% owned by the Government of Egypt.

=== Business trends ===
Trends for recent years for Egyptair Cargo are shown below (for years ending 30 June):

	2008	2009	2010	2011	2012	2013
Turnover (E£ m)	962	573	596	603	652	587
Net Profits (E£ m)	73	80	49	18	75	39
Number of employees	>1,000	n/a	n/a	n/a	>1,400	n/a
Cargo handled (freighter and passenger aircraft) (tons m)	186	168	198	184	203	188
Number of aircraft (at year end)	4	4	4	4	4	4
Notes/sources						

Detailed annual figures have not been published since the year ending 30 June 2013. The cargo division has since concentrated on fleet modernisation—replacing its Airbus A300 freighters with converted A330-200s—and on digitalising its operations.

=== Recent developments ===
EgyptAir Cargo forms part of the EgyptAir Holding Company, which reported record profits across all of its sectors—including air cargo—for the 2024/2025 fiscal year. In 2025 the carrier began a digital overhaul, replacing its legacy systems with Cargo Flash Infotech's cloud-based nGen Integrated Cargo Management System and adopting the IATA One Record standard, as part of a strategy to develop Cairo into a regional logistics hub.

== Destinations ==
As of November 2021, Egyptair Cargo operates flights to:

Country	City	Airport	Notes	Refs
Belgium	Brussels	Brussels Airport		
Belgium	Ostend	Ostend–Bruges International Airport	Focus city	
Chad	N'Djamena	N'Djamena International Airport		
Egypt	Cairo	Cairo International Airport	Hub	
Germany	Cologne/Bonn	Cologne Bonn Airport		
Germany	Frankfurt	Frankfurt–Hahn Airport		
Ghana	Accra	Accra International Airport		
Hong Kong	Hong Kong	Hong Kong International Airport		
India	Mumbai	Chhatrapati Shivaji Maharaj International Airport		
Italy	Milan	Milan Malpensa Airport		
Jordan	Amman	Queen Alia International Airport		
Kenya	Nairobi	Jomo Kenyatta International Airport		
Kuwait	Kuwait City	Kuwait International Airport		
Libya	Tripoli	Mitiga International Airport		
Libya	Benghazi	Benina International Airport		
Libya	Misrata	Misrata International Airport		
Mauritius	Plaine Magnien	Sir Seewoosagur Ramgoolam International Airport		
Nigeria	Kano	Mallam Aminu Kano International Airport		
Nigeria	Lagos	Murtala Muhammed International Airport		
Saudi Arabia	Damman	King Fahd International Airport		
Saudi Arabia	Riyadh	King Khalid International Airport		
South Africa	Johannesburg	O. R. Tambo International Airport		
Sudan	Khartoum	Khartoum International Airport		
Thailand	Bangkok	Suvarnabhumi Airport		
Turkey	Istanbul	Istanbul Airport		
Turkey	Istanbul	Istanbul Atatürk Airport	Airport closed	
United Arab Emirates	Dubai	Al Maktoum International Airport		
United Arab Emirates	Sharjah	Sharjah International Airport		
United States	New York City	John F. Kennedy International Airport		

== Fleet ==
=== Current fleet ===
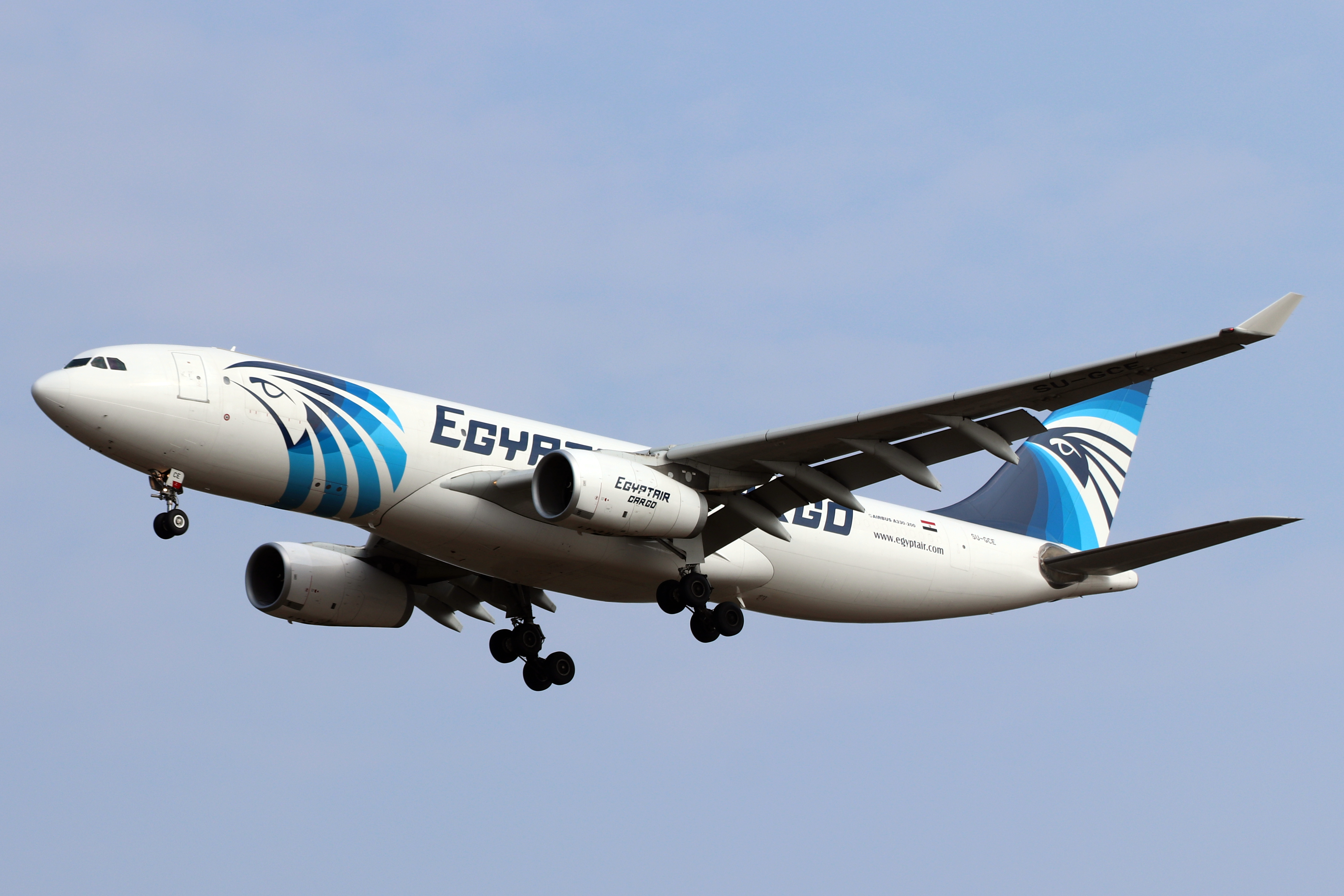
An Egyptair Cargo Airbus A330-200P2F

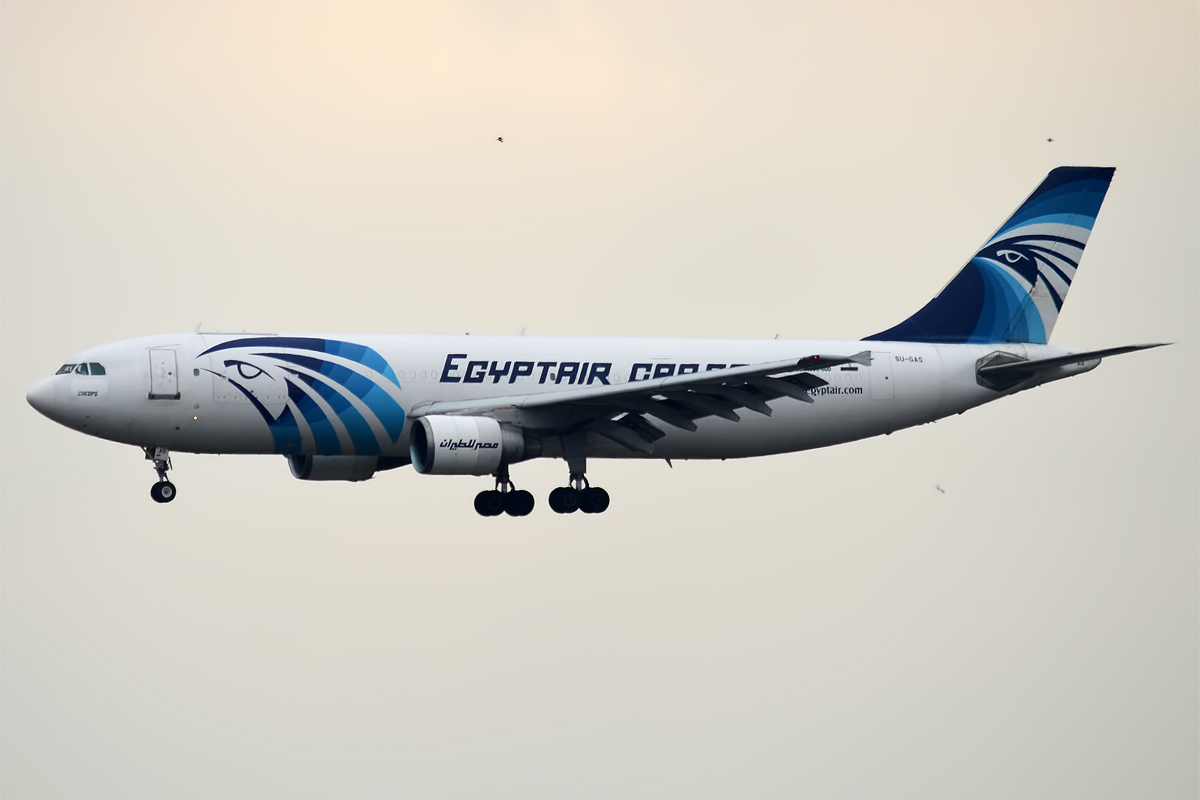
A now retired Egyptair Cargo Airbus A300-600RF

As of June 2026, EgyptAir Cargo operates the following aircraft:

Egyptair Cargo Fleet
Aircraft	In service	Orders	Notes
Airbus A330-200P2F	4	1	Launch customer of the EFW programme; freighter fleet being expanded to five
Boeing 737-800SF	1	—	Converted from Egyptair aircraft
Total	5	1	

=== Former fleet ===
Egyptair Cargo retired fleet
Aircraft	Total	Introduced	Retired	Notes
Boeing 707-320C	4	1973	2004	
