= 1974 EgyptAir Tupolev Tu-154 crash =

1974 aircraft accident in Egypt

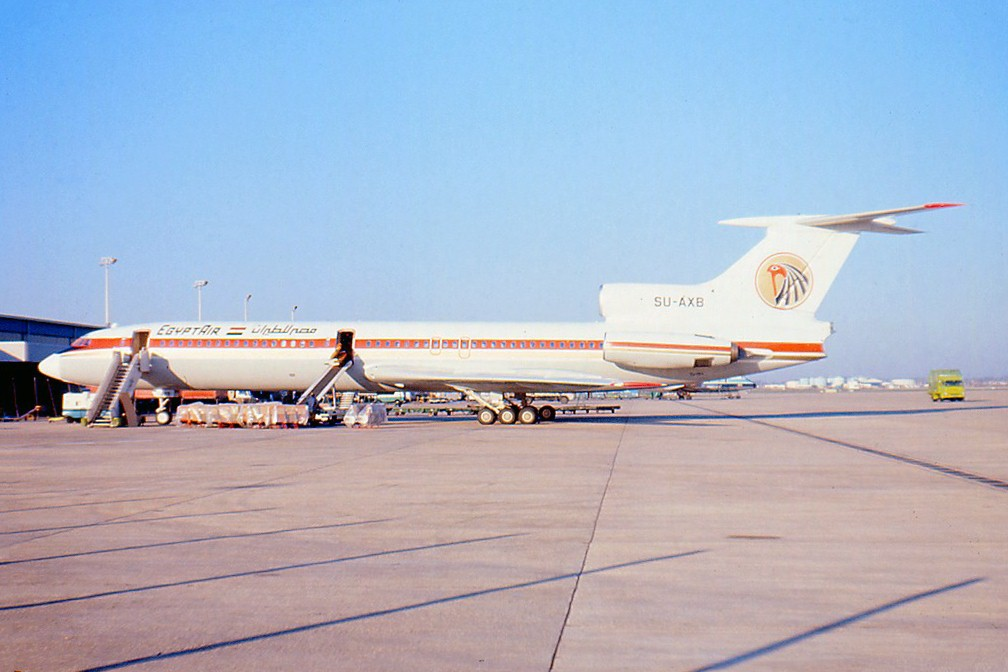
- SU-AXB, the aircraft involved in the accident, pictured in 1973

Accident
- Date: 10 July 1974
- Summary: Stalled due to manufacturing error
- Site: Cairo International Airport, Cairo, Egypt; 30.102°N 31.404°E

Aircraft
- Aircraft type: Tupolev Tu-154
- Aircraft name: Nefertiti
- Operator: EgyptAir
- Registration: SU-AXB
- Flight origin: Cairo International Airport, Cairo, Egypt
- Destination: Cairo International Airport, Cairo, Egypt (return flight)
- Passengers: 0
- Crew: 6
- Fatalities: 6
- Survivors: 0

The 1974 EgyptAir Tupolev Tu-154 crash occurred on 10 July 1974, when an Egyptair Tupolev Tu-154 aircraft crashed during a training flight near Cairo International Airport. This resulted in the deaths of all six crew members on board.

== Aircraft ==
The aircraft was a Tupolev Tu-154 built at the Aviakor аviation plant. It was the first Tupolev Tu-154 delivered to EgyptAir, on 1 December 1973, and was named Nefertiti after the wife of the Egyptian pharaoh Akhenaten.

== Accident ==
The aircraft was performing a training flight at Cairo International Airport carrying a crew of six; two EgyptAir pilots and four Soviet instructors. After three hours and 14 minutes, the aircraft performed a touch-and-go landing on the runway known as Runway 23. During the maneuver, the aircraft pitched-up before entering a stall. This caused the aircraft to crash into the ground at 17:30 local time. All six occupants died.

== Investigation ==
Investigators determined that the pilot flying had applied too many pitch-up inputs, as well as incorrect center of gravity calculations. The shifting ballasts during the flight were also contributing factors.
