= Smart Aviation Company =

Egyptian airline

IATA	ICAO	Call sign
none	SME	-
- Founded: February 2007
- Hubs: Cairo International Airport
- Fleet size: 5 Cessna Citation Sovereign, 2 Bombardier DHC- 8TQ400 + 3 options, 1 King Air 350i, 1 Eurocopter AS350-B3 (leased)
- Headquarters: Cairo, Egypt
- Key people: Roshdy Zakaria (Chairman & Managing Director)
- Website: www.smartaviation.com.eg

Smart Aviation Company is a corporate airline operator based in Egypt. The company launched operations during the second quarter of 2007 from its base in Cairo International Airport.

The company is the first corporate jet operator in the country to cater to businessmen, politicians, executive air travelers and medical services.

In 2009, it expanded its business portfolio to cover medical evacuation in the form of air ambulance operations and in December 2010 will launch commercial passenger operations.

== History ==
Smart Aviation Company launched operations on 3 May 2007 with a single 10-seater Cessna Citation Sovereign jet aircraft.

Smart Aviation is a member of Middle East Business Aviation Association (MEBAA).

== Ownership ==
Smart Aviation Company has 6 stakeholders:

- Civil Aviation Developing and Supporting Fund 40%
- Egyptair Holding Company 10%
- Egyptian Holding Company for Airports and Navigation (EHCAAN) 10%
- Holding Financing Company of Civil Aviation 5%
- National Company for Navigation Services 5%
- National Investment Bank 30%

== Operations ==
The airline provides clients with the facilities (aircraft and ground services) for corporate, VIP and personal travel from Egypt with a new fleet of Cessna Citation Sovereign C-680 aircraft. At Cairo International Airport they currently operate out of the VIP terminal (Terminal 1 – Hall 4); however, in late 2010 the company opened its new executive FBO next to Hall 4.

Services are offered for both domestic and international travel.

In 2009, Smart Aviation received the first two Cessna Citation Sovereign certified for medical evacuation (medevac) with a dual-patient system from LifePort. The two medevac Sovereigns are part of the original 5-aircraft order. The medevac (air ambulance) mission will be in addition to Smart's regular VIP charter service.

In 2010, the company announced plans to begin commercial passenger operations.

The company maintains its fleet inside its 4,000-square-metre hangar which should incorporate the business jets and the new Bombardier turboprops.

In April 2010, the airline revealed plans to launch a new subsidiary dedicated to commercial scheduled and charter passenger services to complement its existing corporate service business. In July 2010 the company selected the Bombardier Q400 over the ATR 72-500 after evaluating both sixty- to seventy-seater aircraft. The company ordered 5 aircraft (2 firm and 3 options) in August 2010. The first 2 aircraft have been delivered in late 2010.

The aircraft based at Cairo International Airport and then fly to a day-base like Sharm el-Sheikh International Airport or Aswan Airport and operate flights from there to key domestic and regional destinations not currently served by other airlines.

On December 15, 2014 Cessna Citation 680 belonging to Smart Aviation landed in Malmö, Sweden carrying 10 asylum seekers from Beirut, Lebanon. Two crew members aged 59 and 56 were arrested on suspicion of organizing human smuggling. Privatjet med flyktingar - Lokalt - NorraSkåne.se

As of early 2015, smart Aviation leased their two Q400s to Bangladesh Airlines for five years. The flight crews were provided for six months—then were terminated / laid off. No plans to continue with the Q400 from lack of marketing and operation expansion.

== Services ==
- Business jets
- Air ambulance
- Flight inspections
- Domestic and regional economic fights
- Full ground handling service (FBO services)

== Fleet ==
As of April 2019, the Smart Aviation fleet consists of the following aircraft:

Smart Aviation Company fleet
Aircraft	In service	Order	Notes
Eurocopter AS350	1	0	
Bombardier Dash 8 Q400	2	0	Both Leased to Biman Bangladesh Airlines One lost in crash as Biman Bangladesh Airlines Flight 60
Cessna Citation Sovereign	5	0	
Total	8	0	
