= EgyptAir Express =

Regional airline of Egypt (2006–2019)

Egyptair Express
IATA	ICAO	Call sign
MS	MSE	EGYPTAIR EXPRESS
- Founded: May 2006
- Commenced operations: 1 June 2007
- Ceased operations: 4 November 2019 (re-integrated into Egyptair)
- Operating bases: Alexandria; Cairo
- Alliance: Star Alliance (affiliate; 2008–2019)
- Parent company: Egyptair
- Headquarters: Cairo, Egypt
- Key people: Helmi Rizq (Chairman)
- Website: www.egyptair.com

Egyptair Express was a regional airline based in Cairo, Egypt. It was a wholly owned subsidiary of the state-owned Egyptair, established in 2006 to offer passengers increased frequencies on domestic and regional routes through the use of smaller aircraft. The airline had been a member of Star Alliance, through the membership of its parent company, Egyptair, since July 2008. On 4 November 2019, it was merged with its parent Egyptair as part of a restructuring plan.

== History ==
Egyptair Express was created in May 2006 and launched operations on 1 June 2007.

In January 2018, it was announced that the airline would open a base at Sharm El Sheikh International Airport for its incoming fleet of Airbus A220-300s, this would increase the amount of destinations served by the airline at the airport with the possibility of operating to cities in Italy, Germany, Morocco and India non-stop.

As of 4 November 2019, as part of Aviation Minister Air Marshal Younes Hamed's restructuring plan, Egyptair Express has been completely merged with Egyptair, its parent company. It continued to operate the Embraer E170 which was gradually being sold at a rate of one per month, being replaced by the Airbus A220 operated by Egyptair mainline. It ceased operations in June 2020 after selling the last Embraer E170

== Corporate affairs ==
The key trends for Egyptair Express are shown below (as at year ending 30 June). Figures for the years ending 30 June 2011 and 2012 (*) were delayed because of disruption caused by the Egyptian Revolution in early 2011, and the figures themselves reflect the disruption that occurred.

	2008	2009	2010	2011	2012	2013	2014	2015	2016	2017
Turnover (E£m)	334	525	706	636	628	796	801	841	958	1,414
Profits (E£m)	4	15	7	−18	−101	7	0.7	2	77	−120
Number of passengers (m)	0.9	1.1	1.5	1.3	1.1	1.3	1.1	1.2	1.2	1.1
Passenger load factor (%)	81	76	77	75	72	79	77	83	79	82
Number of aircraft (at year end)	6	12	12	12	12	11	12	12	12	12
Number of routes (at year end)	11	14	20	25	20	22	24	20	20	20
Notes/sources				(*)	(*)					

== Destinations ==
Egyptair Express served the following destinations as of October 2019:

Country	City	Airport	Notes
Cyprus	Larnaca	Larnaca International Airport	
Egypt	Abu Simbel	Abu Simbel Airport	
Egypt	Alexandria	Borg El Arab International Airport	Base
Egypt	Assiut	Assiut Airport	
Egypt	Aswan	Aswan International Airport	
Egypt	Cairo	Cairo International Airport	Base
Egypt	Hurghada	Hurghada International Airport	
Egypt	Luxor	Luxor International Airport	
Egypt	Marsa Alam	Marsa Alam International Airport	
Egypt	Sharm El Sheikh	Sharm El Sheikh International Airport	
Egypt	Sohag	Sohag International Airport	
Greece	Athens	Athens International Airport	
Hungary	Budapest	Budapest Ferenc Liszt International Airport	
Kuwait	Kuwait City	Kuwait International Airport	
Lebanon	Beirut	Beirut–Rafic Hariri International Airport	Seasonal
Saudi Arabia	Jeddah	King Abdulaziz International Airport	Seasonal
Saudi Arabia	Riyadh	King Khalid International Airport	Seasonal

== Historical fleet ==
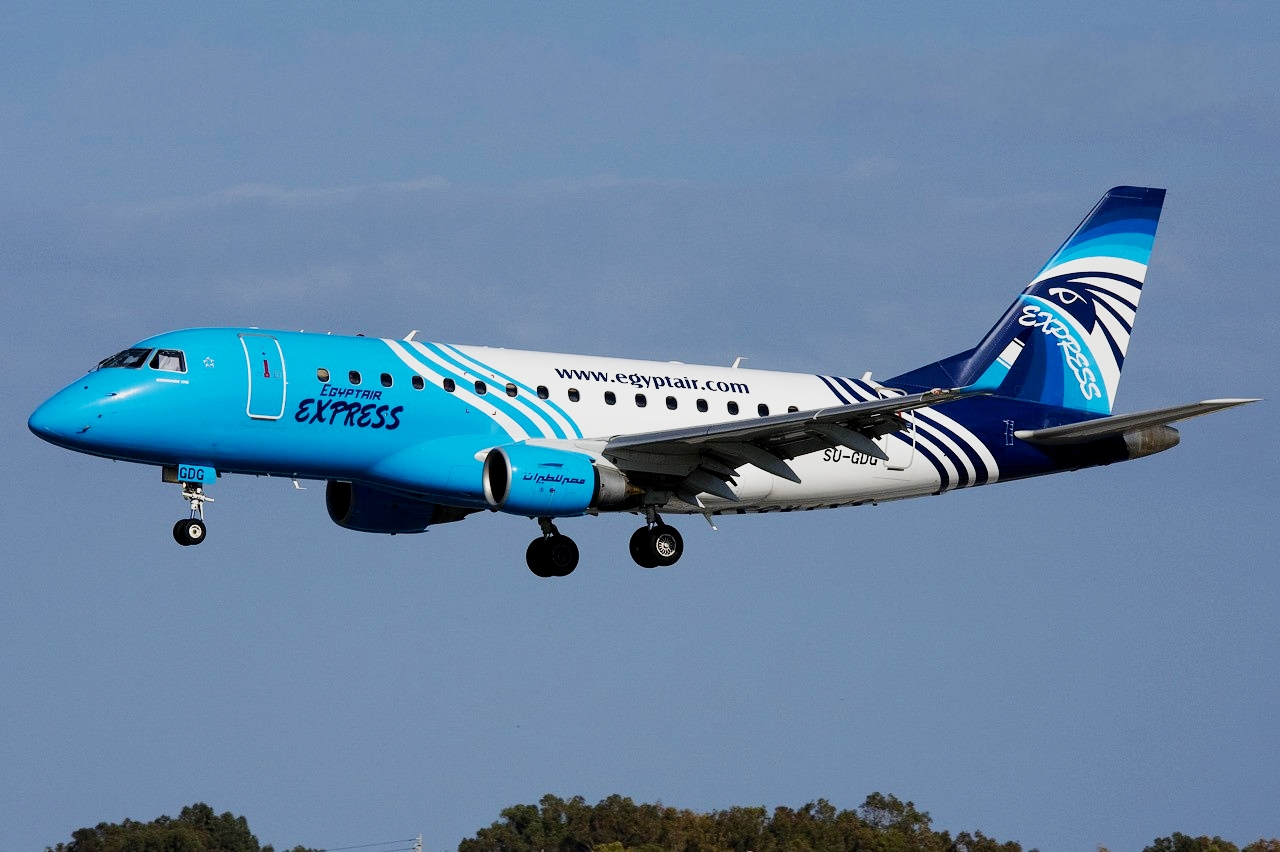
A retired Egyptair Express Embraer 170LR

As of November 2019, prior to the merger into its parent, the Egyptair Express fleet consisted of the following aircraft:

Aircraft	Introduced	Retired	Notes
Embraer 170LR	2007	2019	
