= Ostend–Bruges International Airport =

International airport serving Ostend, Belgium

Ostend–Bruges International Airport Internationale Luchthaven Oostende-Brugge

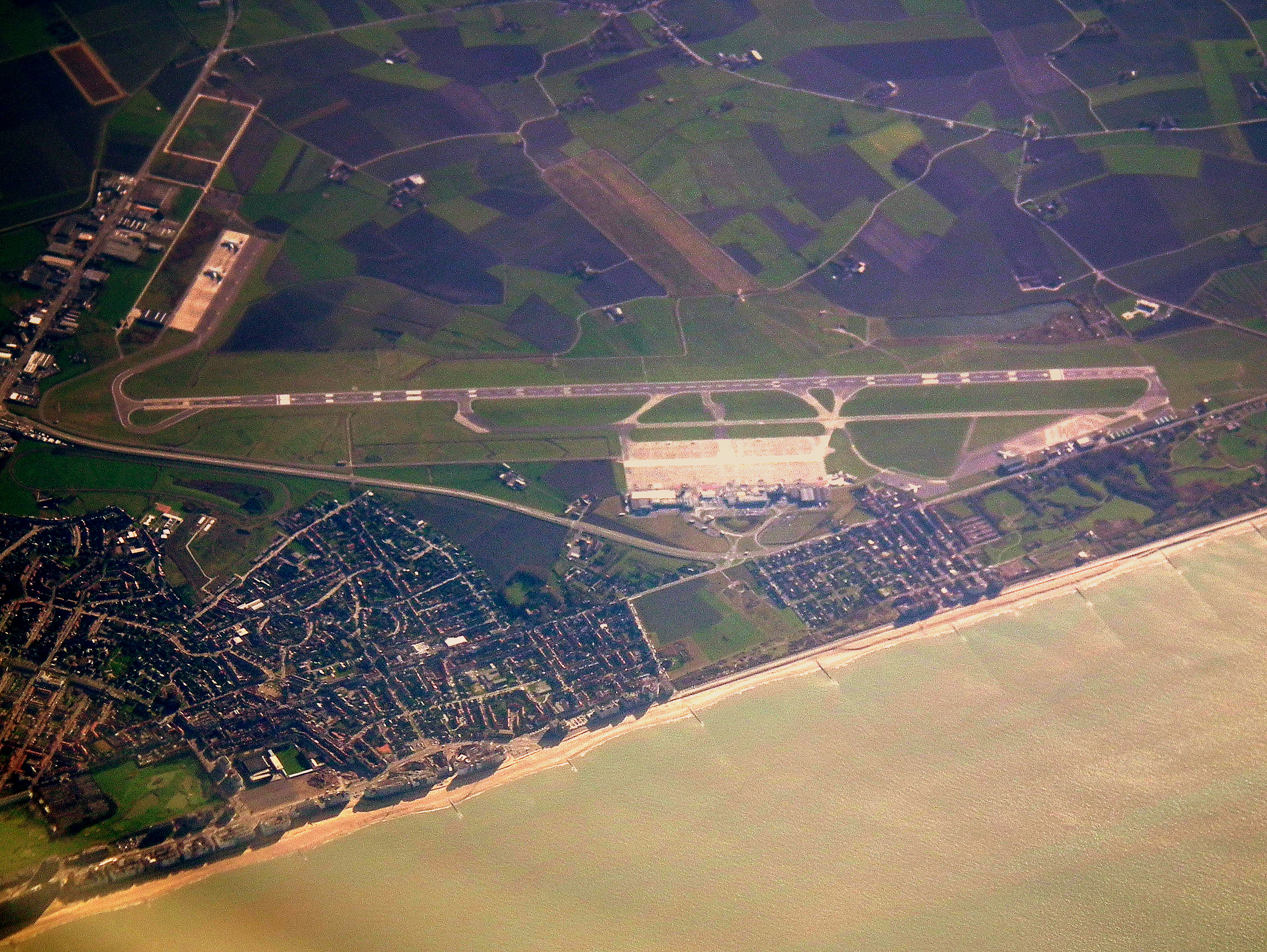
- IATA: OST; ICAO: EBOS

Summary
- Airport type: Public
- Owner: Flemish Region
- Operator: Egis Group
- Serves: Bruges and Ostend, Belgium
- Location: Ostend, West Flanders, Belgium
- Focus city for: TUI fly Belgium, Egyptair Cargo
- Elevation AMSL: 7 ft (2.1 m)
- Coordinates: 51°11′56″N 002°51′44″E
- Website: ost.aero

Map
- Location in Belgium

Runways
| Direction | Length | | Surface |
| Direction | m | ft | Surface |
|---|---|---|---|
| 08/26 | 3,200 | 10,499 | Concrete/Asphalt |
| ~~14/32~~ | | | Grass (closed) |

Statistics (2023)
- Freight (tonnes): 33,000 ▼35.3%
- Passengers: 386,387 ▲4.6%
- Sources: Belgian AIP

Ostend–Bruges International Airport (Note: Dutch: Internationale Luchthaven Oostende-Brugge; French: Aéroport International d'Oostende-Bruges; German: Internationale Flughafen Ostende-Brügge) (IATA: OST, ICAO: EBOS), commonly known simply as Ostend Airport, (Note: Dutch: Luchthaven Oostende; French: Aéroport d'Oostende; German: Flughafen Ostende) is an international airport located 5 km (3 miles) south–southwest of Ostend, Belgium, near the coast and about 25 km (16 miles) from central Bruges.

Although freight transport is the focus of a large proportion of its activities, the airport is increasingly used for passenger flights, mainly charter and holiday flights organised by tour operators. It is also often used for private business flights. The airport covers about 350 hectares (860 acres) of land and has one 3,200-metre (10,500 ft) runway.

== History ==
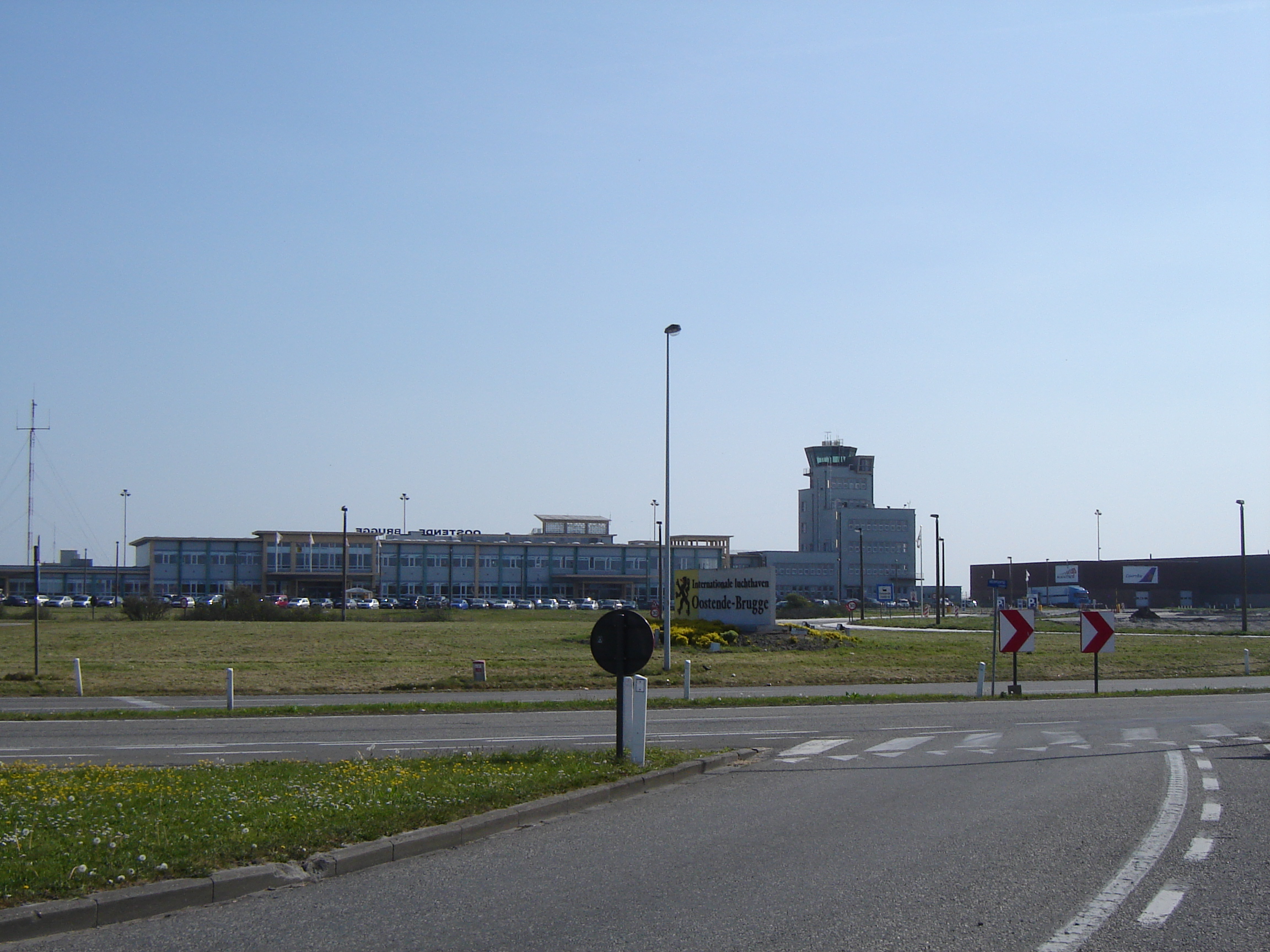
Main building

=== Foundation and early years ===
During the Second World War, the Luftwaffe moved the airfield of Ostend-Stene to a site in the territory of the municipality of Middelkerke, five kilometres southwest of Ostend. It played a major role in the air battle with Britain. After the war, the airport of Raversijde-Middelkerke was turned into an international airport by the Department of Airways which had been established by that time.

Somewhere before the second world war, they had build a grass strip and made it runway 14-32 (627x45 meters). however this has since been closed, very little information is known about it but it is visible from the air as a small strip that extends inland and doesn't match the colour of the surrounding fields.

In 1971, Pomair (Formerly known as Transpomair) opened out of the airport operating flights to the Caribbean, Asia and South America. The airline ceased operations in 1974 with a fleet of 3.

In 1992, the ownership of the regional Flemish airport was transferred from the Belgian State to the Flemish Region and the airport was given a new name: "Ostend–Bruges International Airport".

=== Development since the 2000s ===
On 23 May 2003, Gino Vanspauwen was appointed CEO/Managing Director of Ostend–Bruges International Airport by the Flemish government. He effectively took up his duties on 1 June 2003. The airport was operated by the Department of Mobility and Public Works of the Flemish government. They made an agreement with Egis Group to operate it starting 2014 for a duration of 25 years. Between May and December 2003, Ryanair operated a route between Ostend and London-Stansted.

In 2006, MK airlines opened a hub in Ostend. With this came the expansion of a 4000 square meter hanger to service MK airlines. In 2010, MK airlines ended up going bankrupt and hence left Ostend.

For 2015, Jetairfly began service to a number of new destinations from Ostend. In the summer season of 2015, Jetairfly operated services to a total 20 destinations. As of summer 2017, these services are operated under the new name of TUI fly Belgium, with 21 destinations. In March 2019, Russian airline Pobeda opened a route between Ostend and Moscow Vnukovo. In July Pobeda scrapped the route. While there were talks about re-opening in early 2020 however, this never materialized.

== Airlines and destinations ==
=== Passenger ===
The following airlines operate regular scheduled and seasonal flights at Ostend–Bruges International Airport:

| Airlines | Destinations |
|---|---|
| TUI fly Belgium | Alicante, Gran Canaria, Málaga, Tenerife–South; Seasonal: Antalya, Chania, Eskişehir, Heraklion, Hurghada, Ibiza, Murcia, Palma de Mallorca, Rhodes |

=== Cargo ===
| Airlines | Destinations |
|---|---|
| EgyptAir Cargo | Cairo |

== Ground transportation ==
=== By car ===
The airport is located next to the N318 and N341 national roads.

=== By bus ===
Busses 60a and 60b connect the airport to Ostend's city centre as well as Ostend railway station which operates intercity trains to Antwerp, Brussels and Liege. The busses are operated by De Lijn.

== Accidents and incidents ==
- On 16 November 1937, a Junkers Ju 52/3m of the Belgian airline Sabena crashed on approach due to bad weather. The aircraft flew into a chimney of a brickyard in Stene. All 11 passengers and crew, including Georg Donatus and his family, were killed.
- On 21 July 1992, Douglas DC-3C LX-DKT of Legend Air was damaged beyond repair when it was blown into Boeing 707 Z-WKV during a storm. As of 28 July 2010, the aircraft was still at the airport.
- On 26 July 1997 during an airshow at the airport, a Jordanian stunt pilot, Captain Omar Hani Bilal of the Royal Jordanian Air Force display team, the Royal Jordanian Falcons, was killed when he lost control of his Walter Extra EA300s. His plane crashed at the end of the runway and burst into flames near a Red Cross tent and spectator stands. On the ground, eight people were killed and forty injured.
- On 14 November 1998, an IAT Boeing 707 crashed into the ground within minutes of take-off from Oostende Airport. It was a cargo flight and there were no deaths.
- On 18 April 2001, an Ilyushin Il-76 overran the runway after an aborted take-off. The aircraft got stuck in the grass and hit the ground with the left wing. The plane would never fly again and was scrapped 2 years later at the airport.

== See also ==
- Transport in Belgium
