= United Arab Airlines Flight 749 =

1966 aviation accident

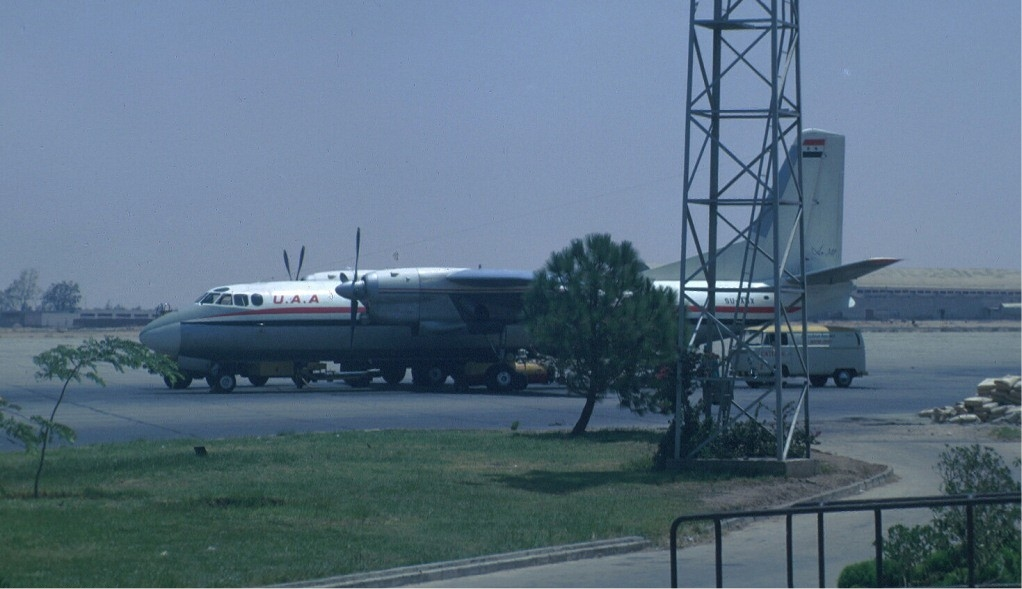
- A United Arab Airlines Antonov An-24 at Cairo, Flight 749's intended destination

Accident
- Date: 18 March 1966
- Summary: Pilot error, poor weather
- Site: Near Cairo International Airport, Cairo, Egypt

Aircraft
- Aircraft type: Antonov An-24
- Operator: United Arab Airlines
- Registration: SU-AOA
- Flight origin: Nicosia Airport, Nicosia, Cyprus
- Destination: Cairo International Airport, Cairo, Egypt
- Occupants: 30
- Passengers: 25
- Crew: 5
- Fatalities: 30
- Survivors: 0

United Arab Airlines Flight 749 was a scheduled international passenger flight on 18 March 1966 that crashed while attempting to land in Cairo, Egypt. All thirty passengers and crew on board were killed.

== Crash ==
Flight 749 took off from Nicosia Airport bound for Cairo International Airport. En route, the aircraft encountered bad weather, and conditions were poor in Cairo due to the presence of sandstorms. The crew of Flight 749 contacted Mirsair's Operations about diversion options. The flight crew also reported they were flying through thunderstorms with icing conditions, that two of the aircraft's altimeters were giving different readings, the magnetic compass being unserviceable, and that there was a crack in a cockpit window panel due to the thunderstorms. After diverting was discussed, Flight 749 continued to Cairo. The flight was cleared for a Runway 23 approach but crashed approximately 5 kilometres from it. Everyone on board Flight 749 perished in the accident.

After the crash, the sandstorm hampered rescue operations. Visibility was near zero and rescue vehicles became bogged down in the drifting sands.

== Investigation ==
Accident investigators determined that "the accident arose from the descent of the aircraft below the safe flight altitude in the final approach and the impact of the port wing against the sand dunes lying to the northeast of the aerodrome. As a result the pilot lost control of his aircraft and hit the ground.

It is probable that the cause of descent of the aircraft below the safe level was due to the change from IFR to VFR, taking into consideration that considerable time would have been needed for the pilot to have adapted to this change in the prevailing weather conditions."

== See also ==
- Stavropolskaya Aktsionernaya Avia Flight 1023, another aviation disaster involving an Antonov An-24 which took place exactly 31 years after Flight 749.
