= EgyptAir =

State-owned flag carrier of Egypt

EgyptAir مصر للطيران Miṣr le-ṭ-Ṭayarān

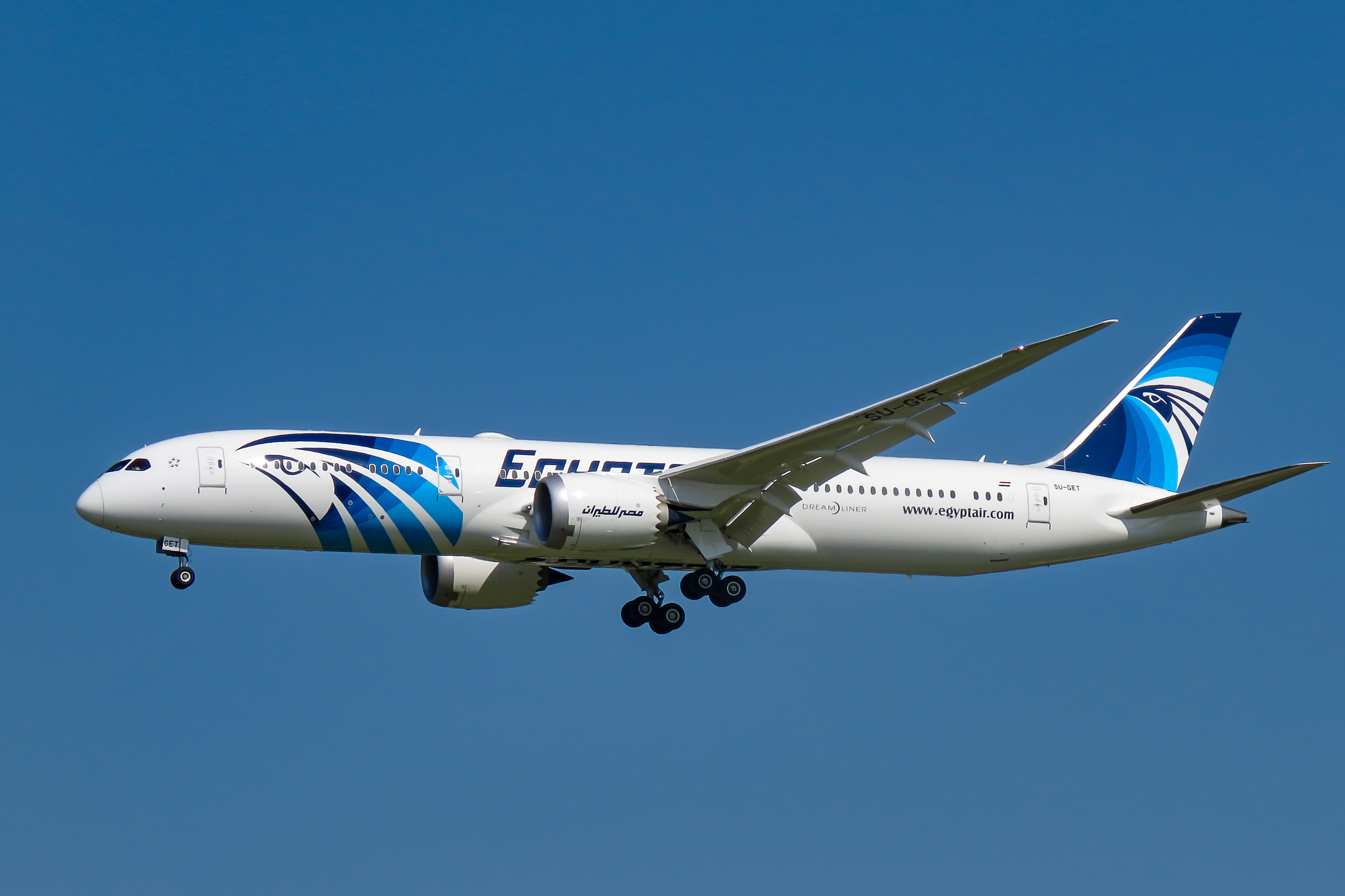
- An EgyptAir Boeing 787-9 Dreamliner
IATA	ICAO	Call sign
MS	MSR	EGYPTAIR
- Founded: 7 June 1932; 94 years ago
- Commenced operations: July 1933; 93 years ago
- Hubs: Cairo
- Focus cities: Alexandria; Sharm El Sheikh
- Frequent-flyer program: Egyptair Plus
- Alliance: Star Alliance
- Subsidiaries: Air Cairo; Egyptair Cargo; Smart Aviation Company
- Fleet size: 73
- Destinations: 93
- Parent company: Egyptair Holding Company (Government of Egypt)
- Headquarters: Egyptair Administrative Complex; Cairo, Egypt
- Key people: Ahmed Adel (chairman & CEO of Egyptair Holding Company); Cpt. Mohamed Elian (chairman and CEO of Egyptair)
- Employees: 9,000 (December 2014)
- Website: www.egyptair.com

EgyptAir is the state-owned flag carrier of Egypt. The airline is headquartered at Cairo International Airport, its main hub, operating scheduled passenger and freight services to 84 international and nine domestic destinations across 56 countries in Africa, Europe, Asia, and the Americas, as of June 2026. Egyptair is a member of Star Alliance, and is the only carrier based in the MENA region to belong to the alliance.

== History ==
=== Early years: Misr Airwork (1932–1949) ===
When Alan Muntz, chairman of Airwork Services, visited Egypt in 1931, he revealed plans to establish new airline, Misr Airwork, with Miṣr (مصر) Arabic for "Egypt". On 31 December 1931, the government granted the company exclusivity in air transport operations. A division of Misr Airwork named Misr Airlines was established on 7 June 1932, ″to promote the spirit of aviation among Egyptian youth″, becoming the seventh carrier in the world at that time. The headquarters of Misr Airwork, S.A.E. was in Almaza Aerodrome, Heliopolis, Cairo.

The initial investment was £E20,000, with ownership split between the Misr Bank (85%), Airwork (10%), and Egyptian private investors (5%). Operations started in July 1933, initially linking Cairo with Alexandria and Mersa Matruh using de Havilland DH.84 Dragon equipment. By August that year, the frequency on the Cairo–Alexandria service had been boosted to twice-daily. In late 1933, a twice-weekly Cairo–Aswan flight that called at Asyut and Luxor was inaugurated. Via Port Said, a flight from Cairo that served Lydda, Haifa and Gaza was launched in 1934. On 3 August 1935, a test service via Lydda with a final destination in Nicosia began using de Havilland D.H.86 aircraft; the service was terminated on 20 October that year. The Alexandria–Port Said–Cairo–Minia–Assiut route was opened in late 1935. During 1935, the airline carried 6,990 passengers and 21,830 kilograms (48,130 lb) of freight; for the year, these regular services flew 419,467 miles (675,067 km).

The Alexandria–Assiut route, which called at Port Said, Cairo and Minia, and the Cairo–Cyprus–Haifa–Baghdad run were the two operative services the carrier had by 1936. Hadj flights commenced in 1937. Operations to Cyprus resumed in 1938 with a Cairo–Lydda–Haifa–Larnaka service. The carrier operated all-British aircraft in the early years, and by April 1939 the fleet comprised one D.H. Dragon, one D.H. Dragonfly, five D.H. Rapìdes, two D.H.86s and one D.H.86B that worked on the Alexandria–Cairo, Alexandria–Port Said–Cairo–Minia–Assiut, Cairo–Assiut–Luxor–Assuan, Cairo–Lydda–Haifa–Baghdad and Cairo–Port Said–Lydda–Haifa routes. The Egyptian government took over all the routes in September 1939. In 1940, a service to Beirut and Palestine was started. Three Avro 19s were incorporated into the fleet in 1944. Three accidents that took place in late 1945 prompted strikes for a fleet renewal and caused operations to come to a total halt since February 1946; services resumed in May, and by late 1946 the fleet included four Avro Ansons, one Beech AT-11, five Beech C-45s, four de Havilland D.H.89 Dragon Rapides and two North American AT-6 Texan. The carrier benefited from the Allies' regional aircraft disposal station that sold surplus military aircraft being located in Egypt. Two more Beech C-45s were delivered in 1947, and the Vickers Viking was incorporated in 1948. In May 1949, all the capital and the aircraft park was acquired by the government. After the Egyptian state became the sole shareholder, the company changed its name to Misrair SAE.

=== Misrair (1949–1957) ===
Misrair continued to fly the same routes as under the new name. In 1951, three Languedocs were acquired; these were intended for deployment on longer routes. The Languedocs replaced the Vikings on flights to Geneva, Khartoum, and Tehran.

On 1 December 1952 Misrair took over the domestic competitor Services Aériens Internationaux d'Égypte (SAIDE) and thus ended the flight operations of this airline. Only the successful route Cairo-Tunis was carried over to Misrair's own route network.

Three Vickers Viscounts were ordered in early 1954. During that year, the carrier transported 64,539 passengers. At March 1955, Misrair's fleet comprised one Beechcraft, three Languedocs and seven Vikings; the three Viscounts were still pending delivery. Douglas DC-3s were subsequently purchased and deployed on domestic routes, as well as to neighbouring Arab countries. Delivery of the first two Viscounts occurred in December 1955; they were put into service in March 1956. Eight months later on 1 November 1956, one Viscount (SU-AIC) was written off while parked at Almaza Airport due to an air-raid by the RAF during the Suez Crisis (Note: Aviation Safety Network misquotes date as 1 October 1956) The number of passengers transported during 1955 had grown to 77050. In February 1957, Misrair was renamed United Arab Airlines. Late that year, two more Viscounts were ordered at a cost of £600,000–800,000, including spares.

=== United Arab Airlines (1957–1971) ===
Following the formation of the United Arab Republic by Egypt and Syria on 1 February 1958, Misrair was renamed United Arab Airlines (UAA) in March that year. (Note: Despite the UAA renaming formally taking place in the autumn of 1960 following the merger of Misrair and Syrian Airways, Misrair had been using the ″United Arab Airlines″ title since 1958.) A Cairo–Athens–Rome–Zürich service was launched on 7 July; Syrian Airways merged into UAA on 23 December, with the latter absorbing both the routes and the equipment of the Syrian carrier. By March 1960, the airline had 579 employees. At that time, the fleet comprised one Beech Model 18, four DC-3s, six Vikings and six Viscounts. One of the Viscounts crashed into the Mediterranean on 10 April, killing 17 passengers and a crew of three. With registration SU-ALC, the first of three Comet 4Cs was delivered on 9 June. Operations using two of these aircraft started on 16 July the same year. By October 1960, Misrair had Comets deployed on the Cairo–Belgrade–Prague, Cairo–Rome–London, Cairo–Jeddah and Cairo–Khartoum runs, DC-3s on the Cairo–Alexandria–Mersa Matruh, Cairo–Assiut–Luxor, Cairo–Luxor–Aswan and Cairo–Port Said–Alexandria services, and Viscounts were used for the non-stop flights that linked Cairo and Alexandria. An order for two more Comets was placed in November 1960. Syria's association with UAA ended in October 1961, when Syrian Arab Airways was established by the Syrian government in Damascus; the route network and fleet that had been taken over by UAA were returned to the new company.

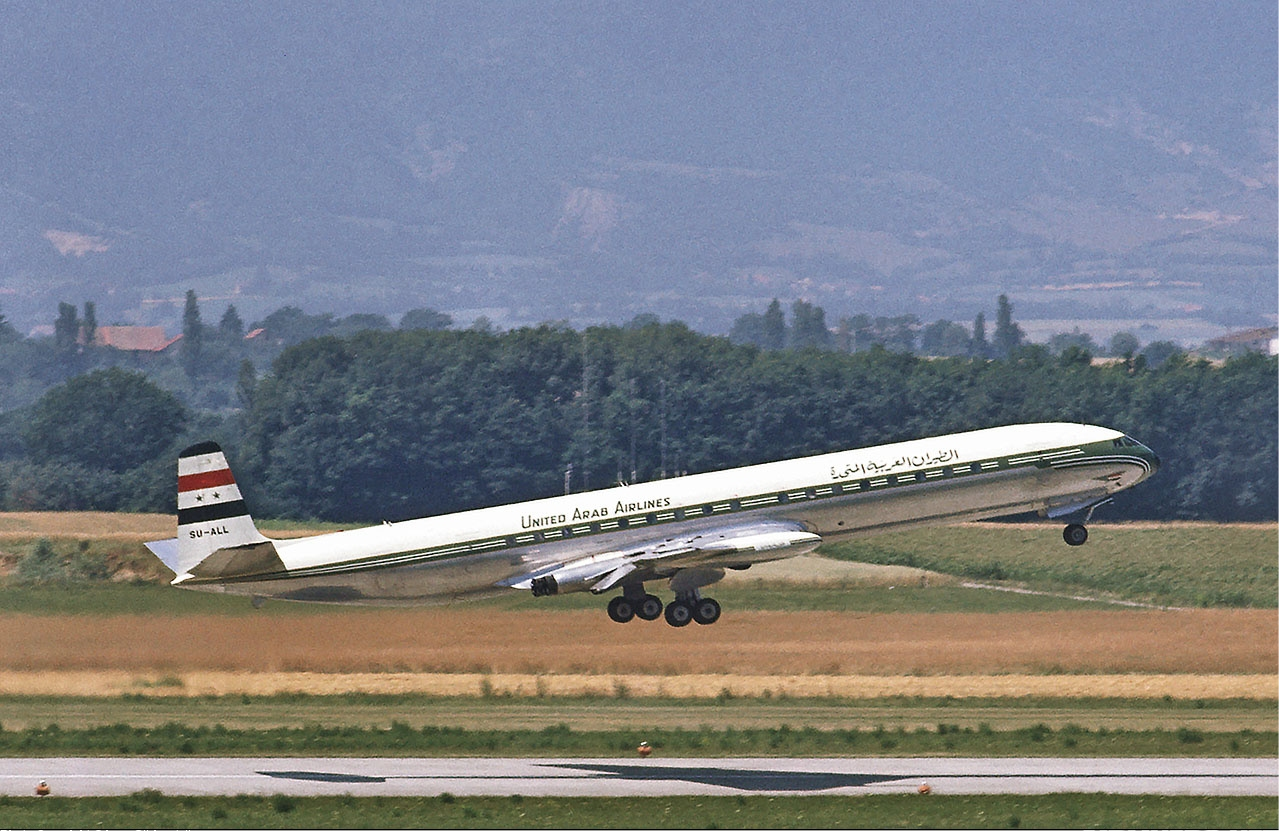
A United Arab Airlines Comet 4C departs Geneva Airport in 1968.

Two more Comets, the fourth and fifth ones, were ordered in early 1961. Three ex-SAS DC-6s were purchased in April 1961. The Cairo–Lagos run was extended to Accra on 12 June and flights to Moscow commenced on 21 June. A contract with Boeing for the purchase of Boeing 707-320B with delivery dates between November 1961 and April 1964 was signed; the deal fell through when the airline could not find financing. On 1 November, a new flight to Karachi and Bombay was launched, and the sixth and seventh Comets were ordered in December; these were delivered in April 1962. Also in 1961, the Cairo–Nicosia run, suspended since the Suez Crisis in 1956, was restored, flown with Viscount equipment. Routed via Bangkok and Hong Kong, the Bombay service was extended to Tokyo in May 1962. The three-strong crew of a DC-3 that crashed at Heliopolis on 16 May 1962 died, and 26 more people perished in an accident involving a Comet at Bangkok on 19 July the same year. Two more Comets were acquired in August, entering the fleet in September the same year and during 1963. On 15 February 1963, the route to Baghdad was resumed after a three-year hiatus, but the service was short-lived, as political tensions between Egypt, Iraq and Syria forced the disruption of flights to both this destination and to Damascus; on 1 April, a new service to Rhodesia was inaugurated. On 12 May 1963 a DC-3 crashed near Alexandria, killing 27 passengers and a crew of four and on 28 July 1963, a Comet crashed into the ocean near Bombay, killing 62. Short of aircraft to serve Tokyo, the route was terminated. Also, another Comet, SU-ALM, resulted damaged in Benghazi on 12 September, the ninth and final Comet was delivered in 1964. Also that year, three ex-Pan Am DC-6Bs were purchased, and another three were acquired from Northwest Orient; these aircraft were put on service on domestic routes and began replacing the Viscounts. Also aimed at operating domestic services, seven Antonov An-24s were ordered for US$2.3 million.

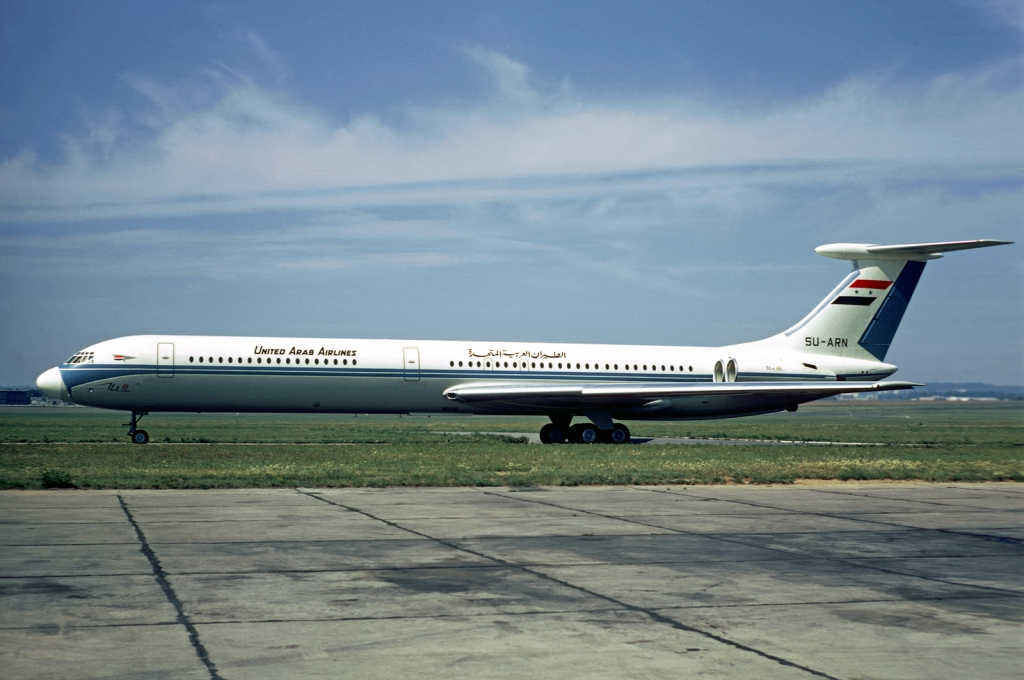
A United Arab Airlines Ilyushin Il-62 at Le Bourget Airport in 1971

By March 1965, seven Comet 4Cs and four Viscounts flew on routes across Europe, the Middle East and North Africa, along with a service to Lagos and Accra. On 1 August, a subsidiary airline named Misrair started operations. (Note: The carrier was conceived to operate domestic and regional services. Four An-24s made up Misrair's fleet at the time operations started, and three more were expected by year end. One of these aircraft was lost in an accident at Aswan Airport on 2 February 1966; a second aircraft was involved in a deadly accident at Cairo on 19 March, killing 30. Alexandria–Athens, Cairo–Alexandria, Cairo–Luxor, Cairo–Nicosia and Cairo–Port Said–El Arish were among the routes operated by the carrier. Misrair ceased to exist on 1 June 1968 due to poor economic performance. Operations were absorbed by UAA.) A contract worth US$30 million for three Boeing 707-320Cs was signed with Boeing on 15 June 1966 and also included four additional machines on option. On 1 November, the airline suppressed the stop at Prague on the Cairo–Prague–Moscow service, and in January 1967 UAA started the Cairo–Frankfurt–Copenhagen run. On 22 June 1967, a Comet crashed in Kuwait while landing; there were no fatalities but the aircraft was written off. In August 1968, the airline took delivery of two Ilyushin Il-18s. The first Boeing 707 was handed over by the aircraft manufacturer on 21 October the same year; it was later put into service on the Cairo–London corridor. One of the Il-18s was involved in a deadly crash while attempting to land at Aswan Airport on 20 March 1969. That March, the carrier started services to East Berlin with Il-18 equipment and in June the route to Tokyo via Kuwait, Bombay, Bangkok and Hong Kong was resumed.

On 14 January 1970, a Comet 4C (SU-ANI) crashed on landing at Addis Ababa from Cairo; no one of the 14 people on board resulted seriously injured. On 30 January 1970 the landing gear of an Antonov An-24V, SU-AOK, collapsed on touchdown at Luxor. On 19 February SU-ALE, another Comet, aborted takeoff from Munich Riem Airport at 30 feet (9.1 m), fell back to the runway, slid until the end of it and hit a fence. Another An-24V, SU-AOC, belly-landed at Cairo on 14 March. At March 1970, UAA had 7,810 employees; the fleet comprised seven An-24Bs, three Boeing 707-366Cs, six Comet 4Cs and three Il-18s. The fourth Boeing 707 was delivered in March 1970. An An-24V (SU-ANZ) was on a training flight and crashed near Cairo, killing the three occupants on 19 July. On 2 January 1971, a Comet (SU-ALC) hit sand dunes on approach to Tripoli, with the loss of lives of the eight passengers on board and the crew of eight. On 23 May 1971, the acquisition of two Ilyushin Il-62s was announced, scheduled for delivery in June the same year. June 1971 saw the airline using these aircraft on European routes, supplementing the services operated with the Boeing 707s. The Il-62s were introduced on Asian services on 9 July. The name of the airline was changed to Egyptair on 10 October 1971, following the country changing its name to Arab Republic of Egypt.

=== Egyptair (1971–onwards) ===
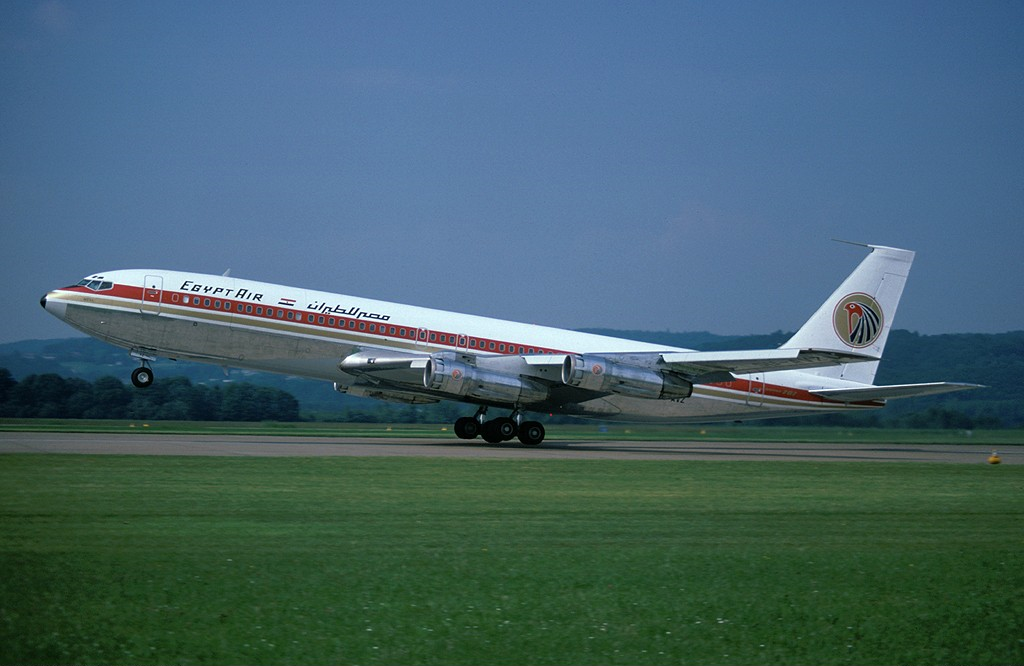
Egyptair Boeing 707-320C at Zurich Airport, 1978

Egyptair inherited UAA's staff, equipment, assets and liabilities. On 19 March 1972, EgyptAir Flight 763, a Douglas DC-9-32 carrying Yugoslav registration YU-AHR crashed into the Shamsan Mountains, 4 miles (6.4 km) southwest of Aden, killing all 30 occupants. On 16 June, an Ilyushin Il-62 (SU-ARN) was involved in a landing accident with no reported fatalities. In July, eight Tupolev Tu-154s were ordered for US$60 million, with three of them slated for delivery in July 1973, three in November 1973 and two in March 1974. Before firming the transaction up Egyptair had also considered the Boeing 727, but financing for these US-manufactured aircraft could not be arranged. Under the terms of the contract, light maintenance was to be performed in Egypt, whereas airframe and engine overhauling was to be undertaken in the Soviet Union. In July 1972, the acquisition of four Boeing 707-320Cs valued at US$40 million was announced. At this time, the airline had four Boeing 707s already in operation. The handover of the new aircraft had been arranged for March, May, June and September 1973. On 5 December 1972, one of the four 707s already in the fleet (SU-AOW) crashed near Cairo while on a training flight. The crew of six perished in the accident. Reports indicating the airframe had been shot down were denied by the Egyptian government. An Ilyushin Il-18, registration SU-AOY, was involved in a deadly accident near Nicosia on 29 January 1973 when it crashed into mountainous terrain, killing all 37 occupants. Delivery of the four new Boeing 707s took place during the year, with two more 707-320Cs being ordered in September. In October the three Il-62s were returned to Aeroflot because of elevated operational costs and technical issues. Also that month, the first Tu-154 entered the fleet and was used for pilot training. From Moscow, the handover of the Tu-154s was made through London-Heathrow, where these aircraft were fitted with British-made seats.

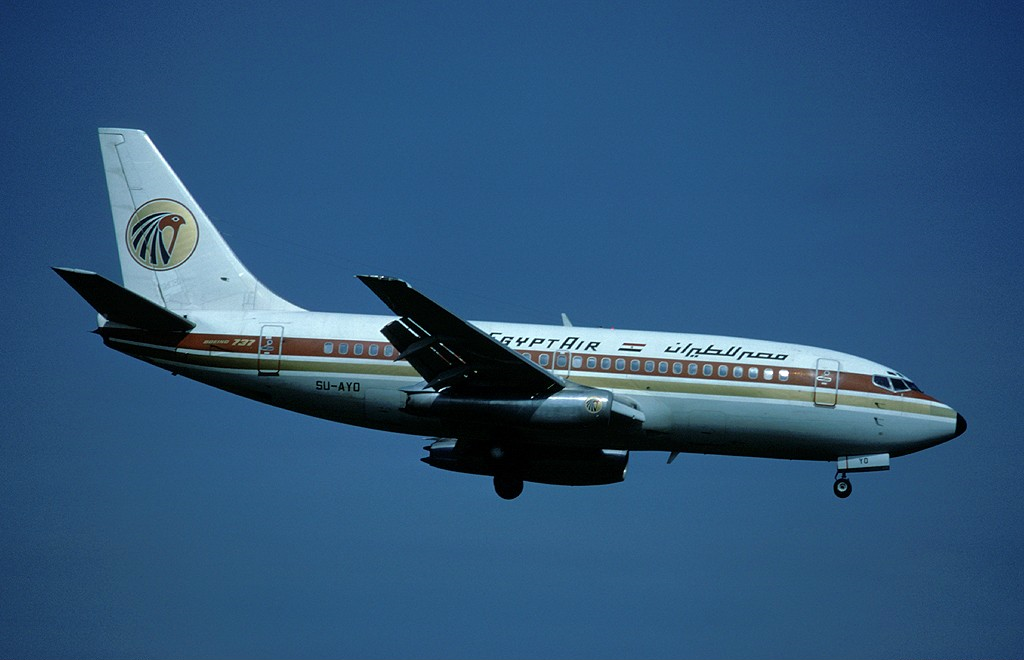
Egyptair Boeing 737-200 Advanced, 1979

The outbreak of the Yom Kippur War in 1973 had forced the carrier to suspend the Tokyo service; it was resumed on 15 March 1974 via Bombay, Bangkok and Manila. During 1974, the flight to Khartoum was extended to Kinshasa. One of the brand new Tu-154 aircraft, SU-AXB, crashed on 10 July 1974 after takeoff from Cairo International Airport during a training flight, killing a crew of six on board. Following the crash Egyptair requested the return of its Tu-154 fleet to the Soviets and a refund for the price paid for them. The capacity shortage caused by the grounding of the Tu-154s was partly alleviated by the lease of aircraft. The airline had already been looking for other aircraft to replace them and an order for six Douglas DC-9-50s was placed in November. On 9 December, an Il-18, registration YR-IMK, crashed into the Red Sea; there were nine fatalities. In January 1975, the government turned the order with Douglas down and moved to Boeing for the provision of new equipment. An agreement with the Soviets for the return of the Tu-154s was struck on 10 February; early in the year, the An-24s were traded back to the company that represented the Soviets as partial repayment for the loan taken to acquire the aft-engined Tu-154s. The Boeing order was finalised by March and consisted of four Boeing 727-200s and six Boeing 737-200s. There were plans to trade the first three Boeing 707-320Cs in for the new aircraft as part of the deal with Boeing. Valued at US$60 million, the transaction was partly financed by the United Arab Emirates. In May, the order was homogenised to eight Boeing 737-200s with deliveries slated for April and May 1976. Arrangements were made to sell the four Comets both to raise money to finance the new aircraft and to have an all-Boeing fleet.

A link between Cairo and Milan began in January 1976 and a new flight to Vienna started in April. Following allegations from the Egyptian parliament that airline officials had been bribed by Boeing to favour the 1975 order, the chairman Gamal Erfan resigned in February. On 22 April, a Boeing 737 flying from Cairo to Luxor was hijacked by three Palestinians; an Egyptian commando team regained control of the aircraft with no damages to its structure. The four Comets were sold to Dan-Air on 9 October. During the year, seven Boeing 737 Advanced entered the fleet. A serious accident involving a Boeing 707 took place on 25 Dec when a non-regular flight from Cairo to Tokyo crashed into a textile mill while on approach to Bangkok, killing all 43 passengers and a crew of nine; fatalities and injured people on the ground were also reported. Early in 1977, the first arrests related to the bribery case involving the Boeing order took place when a former pilot admitted he had been bribed for US$150,000. In February, an agreement to lease two Airbus A300B4 aircraft from Germanair and Trans European Airlines was signed. On 1 April, services to Abu Dhabi and Karachi were launched. The first A300 service flew the Cairo–Karachi route on 3 June. The lease conditions for the aircraft owned by Bavaria Germanair changed to a lease/purchase agreement. Egyptair eventually acquired the two leased A300B4 aircraft. On 21 February 1978, a Boeing 707 made an emergency landing at Sharjah Airport after hitting a flock of birds; the incident caused substantial damage to the fuselage and the engines. During 1979, three A300B4-200s were ordered for US$115 million with a delivery span between September 1980 and September 1981; the carrier took options on four more aircraft of the type. Financing for the three firmly ordered aircraft was partly provided by the Midland Bank and the Dresdner Bank.

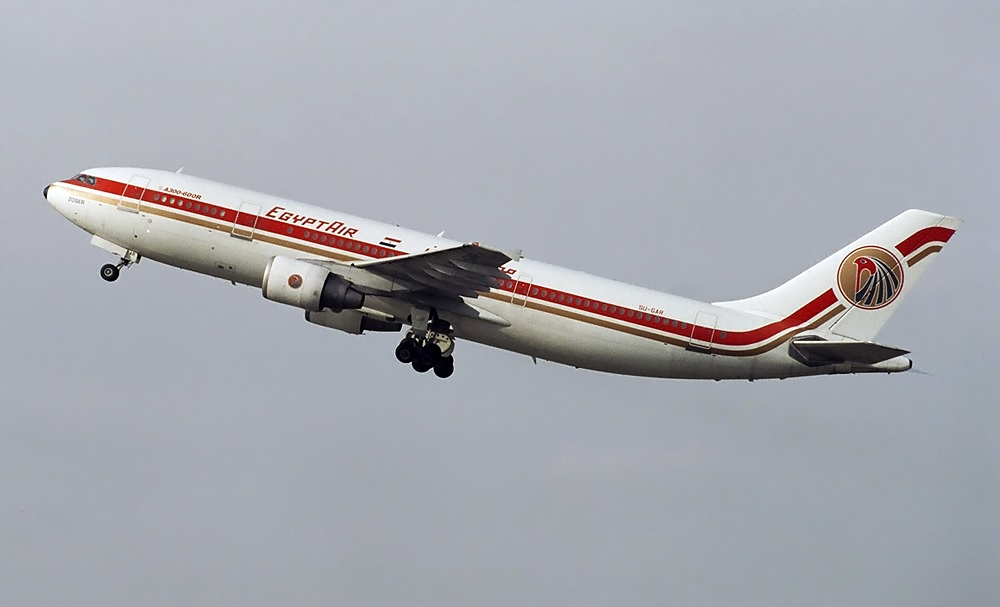
An Egyptair Airbus A300B4-600R, 1997

At March 1980 the number of employees was 9,610 and the fleet consisted of two Airbus A300B4s, seven Boeing 707-320Cs, seven Boeing 737-200s and two Beech Barons. There was a major financial reorganisation in November 1980 when ownership of the company was shared by the National Bank of Egypt and the Misr Insurance Company. In 1981, options for two Airbus A300B4-200s were converted into a firm order. This took the count of A300 aircraft pending delivery to four. At November this year the airline had five aircraft of the type in the fleet, two of them leased. Another A300B4-200 was ordered in 1982. Overall, eight new Airbus A300B4s were introduced during the early 1980s. Three Boeing 767-200ERs (named "Nefertiti", "Nefertari" and "Tiye") were phased in during 1984. Two Boeing 767-300ERs (named "Tuthmosis III" and "Ramses II") were phased in during 1989. On 31 October 1999, "Tuthmosis III" crashed into the Atlantic Ocean, killing all 217 people on board.

Egyptair is a state-owned company with special legislation permitting the management to operate as if the company were privately owned without any interference from the government. The company is self-financing without any financial backing by the Egyptian government.

The airline underwent a major corporate re-engineering in 2002 when its structure was changed from a governmental organization into a holding company with subsidiaries. The move coincided with the establishment of the Egyptian Minister of Civil Aviation and the government's ambitious strategy to modernize and upgrade its airports and airline. The airline was given the right to operate without any interference from the government and the duty to do so without any financial backing.

Egyptair wholly owns Egyptair Express and Air Sinai. The airline has stakes in Air Cairo (60%) and Smart Aviation Company (20%).

In May 2006, the airline launched a regional subsidiary called Egyptair Express with a fleet of new Embraer E170 jets with services commencing in 2007. The carrier links Cairo with Sharm El Sheikh, Hurghada, Luxor, Aswan, Marsa Alam, Abu Simbel and Alexandria (Egypt) in addition to secondary destinations to complement the parent company's network. In June 2009, the subsidiary received the last of the 12 E170 aircraft on order.

This is fortified by huge assets of more than US$3.8 billion. The airline's financial year is from July to June. For the fiscal year ending 31 July 2007, Egyptair achieved a record total revenue of US$1.143 billion. Total group revenue grew by 14%, as compared with the previous year.

In early 2007, the airline partnered with the Egyptian Ministry of Civil Aviation and Egyptian Holding Company for Airports & Air Navigation to form a new corporate airline, Smart Aviation Company, based at Cairo Airport.

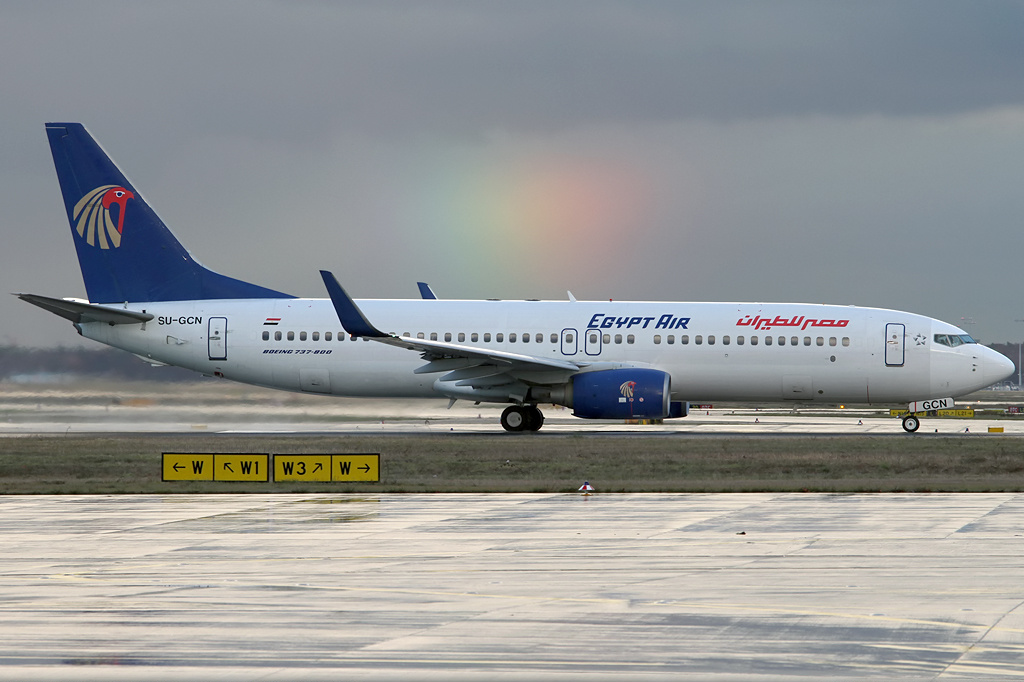
An Egyptair Boeing 737-800 in old livery at Frankfurt Airport, 2013

In 2009, Egyptair's operations at its Cairo International Airport hub (where it holds 61% of the airport's departure slots) were notably overhauled due to the inauguration of the new Terminal 3 in April 2009. The airline transferred all its operations (international and domestic) to the new terminal that has more than doubled the airport's capacity. Under the Star Alliance "Move Under One Roof" concept at Cairo Airport, all Star Alliance airlines serving Cairo have moved to Terminal 3. In 2010 the airline will overhaul operations at its Alexandria base by transferring operations from the older facilities at El Nouzha Airport to the new airport in Borg El Arab Airport.

During the 2009–2010 Paris Airshow, the airline announced a new venture with US lessor Aviation Capital Group (ACG) and other Egyptian private and public shareholders to establish a leasing joint venture focusing on the Middle East and Northern Africa region. The new joint venture – named Civil Aviation Finance and Operating Leases (CIAF-Leasing) will initially focus on narrowbody aircraft.

Following the revolution of 2011, Egyptair is reported to have suffered considerable losses. Egypt's civil aviation minister Wael El Maadawi said the airline lost an estimated 1.3 billion Egyptian pounds, or around $185 million, over the 2012/13 fiscal year, mainly due to an increase in fuel prices, the devaluation of the Egyptian currency and continuous strikes within the company. Losses for 2011/12 were apparently around double the 2012/13 figures. The carrier has reportedly suffered total losses of more than 7bn pounds, or nearly $1bn, since the 2011 uprising.

In the middle of 2012, a group of flight attendants asked for the right to wear hijabs as part of their work uniform. The company granted their request and hijab-wearing flight attendants first appeared in November 2012.

In November 2015, two weeks after the crash that brought down Metrojet Flight 9268 in the Sinai Peninsula, Russian authorities banned Egyptair from flying to Russia, citing security concerns.

In January 2016, Egyptair was fined US$140,000 for leasing aircraft to Sudan Airways during 2010–11, breaking economic sanctions imposed on Sudan in 1997.

In April 2018, Russian authorities lifted the ban that prevented Egyptair from flying to Russia.

Egyptair is one of the few airlines which does not serve alcoholic beverages on its flights.

As part of a restructuring of Egyptair, Aviation Minister Air Marshall Younes Hamed announced the merger of Egyptair Express, Egyptair Cargo, and Egyptair Ground Services Company with the mainline airline. As of 4 November 2019, only Egyptair Express was officially merged with the rest of plan to be completed by the end of 2019.

=== Recovery, modernisation and expansion (2020–present) ===
The COVID-19 pandemic grounded most of Egyptair's network in 2020, but traffic recovered strongly thereafter alongside a rebound in Egyptian tourism, which reached about 19 million visitors in 2025, up roughly 21% year-on-year.. The airline carried 10.289 million passengers in 2024, up from 9.826 million in 2023. For the 2024/2025 fiscal year, the Ministry of Civil Aviation said EgyptAir Holding Company recorded the highest annual profits in its history, in both local and foreign currency, though no figures were disclosed; it was the airline's second consecutive year of record results.

In June 2025, at the Paris Air Show, EgyptAir was named "Best Airline in Africa for Passenger Services" for 2025 in the Skytrax World Airline Awards—a first for Egyptian civil aviation—and also took the awards for Most Improved Airline in Africa (for the second consecutive year), Best Airline Staff in Africa, Best Cabin Crew in Africa, and Best Economy Class Catering in Africa, while rising 20 places to 68th in the Skytrax Top 100 Airlines list.

Captain Ahmed Adel returned as Chairman and CEO of the holding company on 23 February 2025, succeeding Yehia Zakaria. Under a fleet-restructuring plan developed with an external consultancy, EgyptAir is acquiring 34 new aircraft—16 Airbus A350-900s and 18 Boeing 737 MAX 8s—and targets a fleet of 97 aircraft by the 2030/2031 fiscal year; the wider Ministry of Civil Aviation has stated a goal of 125 aircraft by 2030. A parallel cabin-refurbishment programme covering 19 Boeing 737-800s, with new Collins seating and Panasonic in-flight entertainment, began in mid-2025 and is due to finish by the end of 2026. The expansion is paired with a roughly US$4.5 billion redevelopment of the airline's Cairo International Airport base.

EgyptAir took delivery of its first Airbus A350-900 (SU-GGE) on 9 February 2026, becoming the launch operator of the type in North Africa and the third A350 operator in Africa after Ethiopian Airlines and Air Mauritius. The aircraft enabled a major North American expansion: a thrice-weekly Cairo–Los Angeles service launched on 23 May 2026—the airline's longest route and a resumption of a city pair dropped after the 1999 loss of EgyptAir Flight 990—followed by thrice-weekly Cairo–Chicago O'Hare flights from 21 June 2026, with San Francisco planned for late 2026 or early 2027. These additions brought EgyptAir's North American network to six destinations—New York–JFK, Newark, Washington–Dulles, Toronto, Chicago and Los Angeles—and the airline targeted around 85 destinations system-wide in 2026.

== Corporate affairs ==
=== Ownership and structure ===
Egyptair is a state-owned company, 100% owned by the Government of Egypt. The Egyptair Holding Company was created in 2002 with seven companies, with two further companies added at later dates.

There are three carriers, which operate under the same AOC but are managed separately and have their own profit and loss accounts:

- Egyptair Airlines, the core airline company
- EgyptAir Cargo, a dedicated cargo airline (established in 2002)
- EgyptAir Express, the domestic and regional airline (launched in June 2007)

Other companies within Egyptair Holding Company are:

- Egyptair Maintenance & Engineering, originally an in-house operation but now also carrying out 3rd party business; EASA Part 145 and FAA Certified
- Egyptair Ground Services, providing services to over 75% of the air carriers flying to Egypt
- Egyptair In-flight Services
- Egyptair Tourism & Duty Free Shops
- Egyptair Medical Services
- Egyptair Supplementary Industries Company (formed in 2006)

=== Key people ===
As of June 2026, Cpt. Mohamed Elian holds the chairman and CEO positions.

=== Subsidiaries and associates ===
The airline has stakes in:

- Air Cairo (60%)
- Smart Aviation Company (13.33%)
- Air Sinai (100%)
- Egypt Aero Management Service (50%)
- LSG Sky Chefs Catering Egypt (70%)
- CIAF-Leasing (20%)

=== Business trends ===
Data for the Egyptair Holding Company and for its main subsidiary Egyptair Airlines, are shown below (for years ending 30 June):

	2007	2008	2009	2010	2011	2012	2013	2014	2015	2016	2017
Egyptair Holding Company
Turnover (LE million)	8,959	12,161	12,998	13,509	12,890	14,545	16,593	16,782	17,734	17,298	25,084
Net profit (LE million)	579	695	573	533	−2,059	−3,106	−1,748	−2,817	37	13	72
Number of passengers (m)	7.8	8.2	7.9	8.7	8.0			8.2			
Passenger load factor (%)				72	68					66	69
Cargo carried (tons m)				127	121	122					
Number of aircraft (at year end)	45	50	59	66	76	79	81	81	81		77
Egyptair Airlines
Turnover (LE million)	6,947	9,265	9,917	10,189	9,678	10,975	12,877	13,139	14,140	13,597	20,010
Net profits (LE million)	161	232	208	130	−2,205	−3,069	−1,885	−2,923	−0,977	−1,279	−5,553
Number of passengers (m)	5.7	6.7	6.8	7.3	6.8	7.2	7.8	7.1	7.4	7.3	7.0
Passenger load factor (%)	63	67	68	72	68	65	67	63		66	69
Number of aircraft (at year end)	38	40	48	50	63	64	65	65	60		50
Notes/sources											

Trends for Egyptair Express and EgyptAir Cargo are shown on the relevant articles. The lack of detailed published accounts since the year ending 30 June 2011 reflects the disruption that began with the Egyptian Revolution. The airline carried 10.289 million passengers in calendar 2024 (up from 9.826 million in 2023), and the Ministry of Civil Aviation reported that the holding company achieved record profits in both the 2023/2024 and 2024/2025 fiscal years, without disclosing figures.

=== Head office ===
EgyptAir is headquartered in the EgyptAir Administrative Complex on the grounds of Cairo International Airport in Cairo.

=== Logo ===
The airline's logo is Horus, the sky deity in ancient Egyptian mythology, chosen because of its ancient symbolism as a "winged god of the sun", and usually depicted as either a falcon or a man with the head of a falcon.

The Horus made its first appearance in the early 1970s. It was originally painted with a red head and blue feathers in front of a golden backdrop. It was painted around the plane including the engine cases. This was due to EgyptAir wanting to keep a warm coloured livery in the early days of the airline.

== Destinations ==
As of June 2026, Egyptair serves 84 international and nine domestic destinations across 56 countries. New routes opened in 2024 included Taif and Tabuk in Saudi Arabia, Fujairah in the United Arab Emirates, and Mogadishu in Somalia, and in 2026 the airline added Chicago, Los Angeles and a Cairo–Venice service.

=== Alliances ===
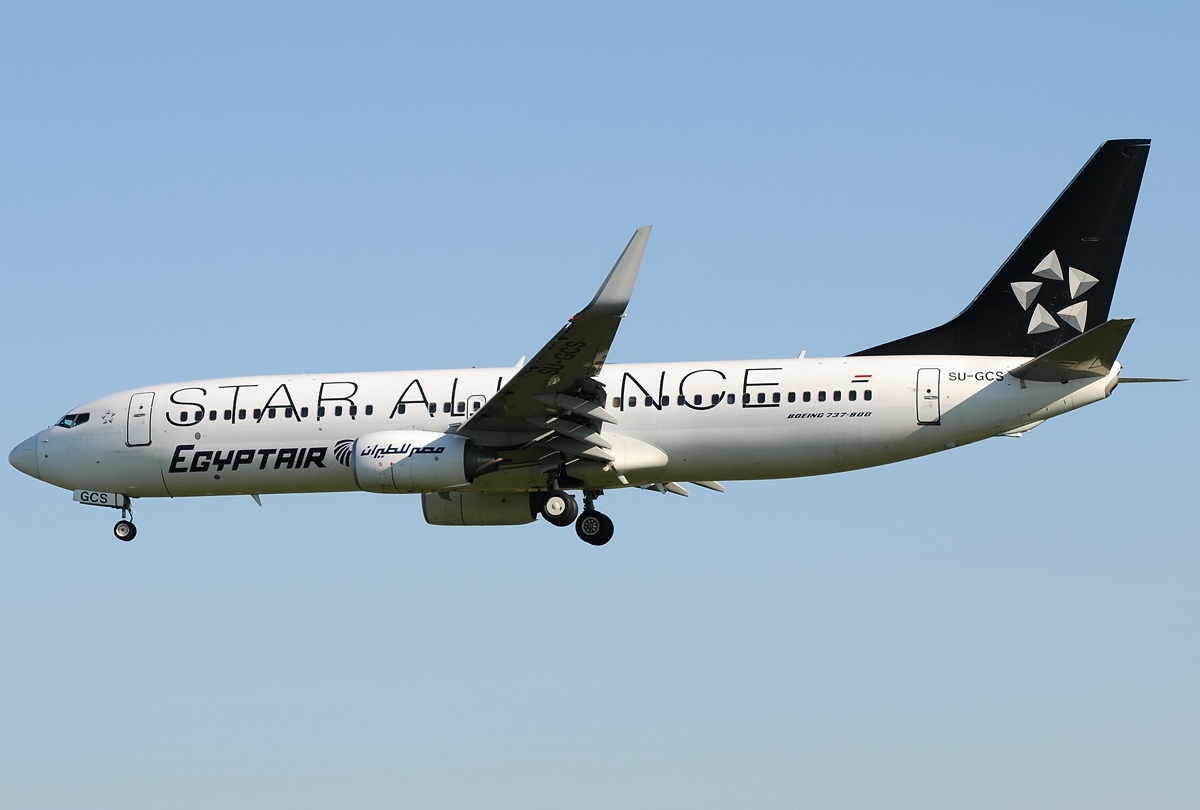
An Egyptair Boeing 737-800 in Star Alliance special livery

In October 2007, the Chief Executive Board of Star Alliance voted to accept Egyptair as a future member, the first airline from an Arab country and the second African one – after South African Airways – to join the airline alliance. In a ceremony held at Cairo International Airport on 11 July 2008, the carrier became the 21st member of this alliance, nine months after it started the joining process.

In October 2020, Egyptair reached an agreement with the government of Ghana to create a Ghanaian national aviation company with investment from both governments.

EgyptAir remains the only MENA-based member of Star Alliance. In May 2026, Star Alliance CEO Theo Panagiotoulias visited the carrier's Cairo headquarters to discuss expanded cooperation, coinciding with the delivery of EgyptAir's third Boeing 737 MAX 8.

=== Codeshare agreements ===
Egyptair has codeshare agreements with the following airlines:

- Aegean Airlines
- Air Cairo
- Air Canada
- Air China
- Air India
- Asiana Airlines
- Austrian Airlines
- Avianca
- Brussels Airlines
- Ethiopian Airlines
- Etihad Airways
- Gulf Air
- Kenya Airways
- LOT Polish Airlines
- Lufthansa
- Royal Air Maroc
- Scandinavian Airlines
- Shenzhen Airlines
- Singapore Airlines
- South African Airways
- Swiss International Air Lines
- TAP Air Portugal
- Thai Airways International
- Turkish Airlines
- United Airlines

=== Interline agreements ===
- Flynas

Additionally it has a partnership with CEIBA Intercontinental for technical support, training, and route expansion.

=== Suspension and resumption of service to Qatar ===
Due to the 2017 Qatar Diplomatic crisis, Egyptair (among other carriers from Bahrain, Egypt, Saudi Arabia and the United Arab Emirates) suspended its flights to Doha's Hamad International Airport in Qatar as per the instructions from the Egyptian Government.

In 2021, after Egypt signed the Al-'Ula declaration with Qatar (along with the rest of GCC members) Egyptair resumed flights to Doha ending its three-and-half-year boycott of Qatar.

== Fleet ==
=== Current fleet ===
As of July 2026, Egyptair operates the following aircraft:

Egyptair fleet
Aircraft	In service	Orders	Passengers			Notes
Aircraft	In service	Orders	C	Y	Total	Notes
Airbus A320neo	8	—	16	126	142	
Airbus A321neo	7	—	16	166	182	
Airbus A330-200	3	—	24	244	268	2 to be converted to freighters.
Airbus A330-300	4	—	36	265	301	
Airbus A350-900	3	13	30	310	340	
Boeing 737-800	30	—	24	120	144	
Boeing 737-800	30	—	16	138	154	
Boeing 737 MAX 8	3	15	TBA			
Boeing 777-300ER	5	—	49	297	346	
Boeing 787-9	8	—	30	279	309	
Total	72	28				

=== Gallery ===
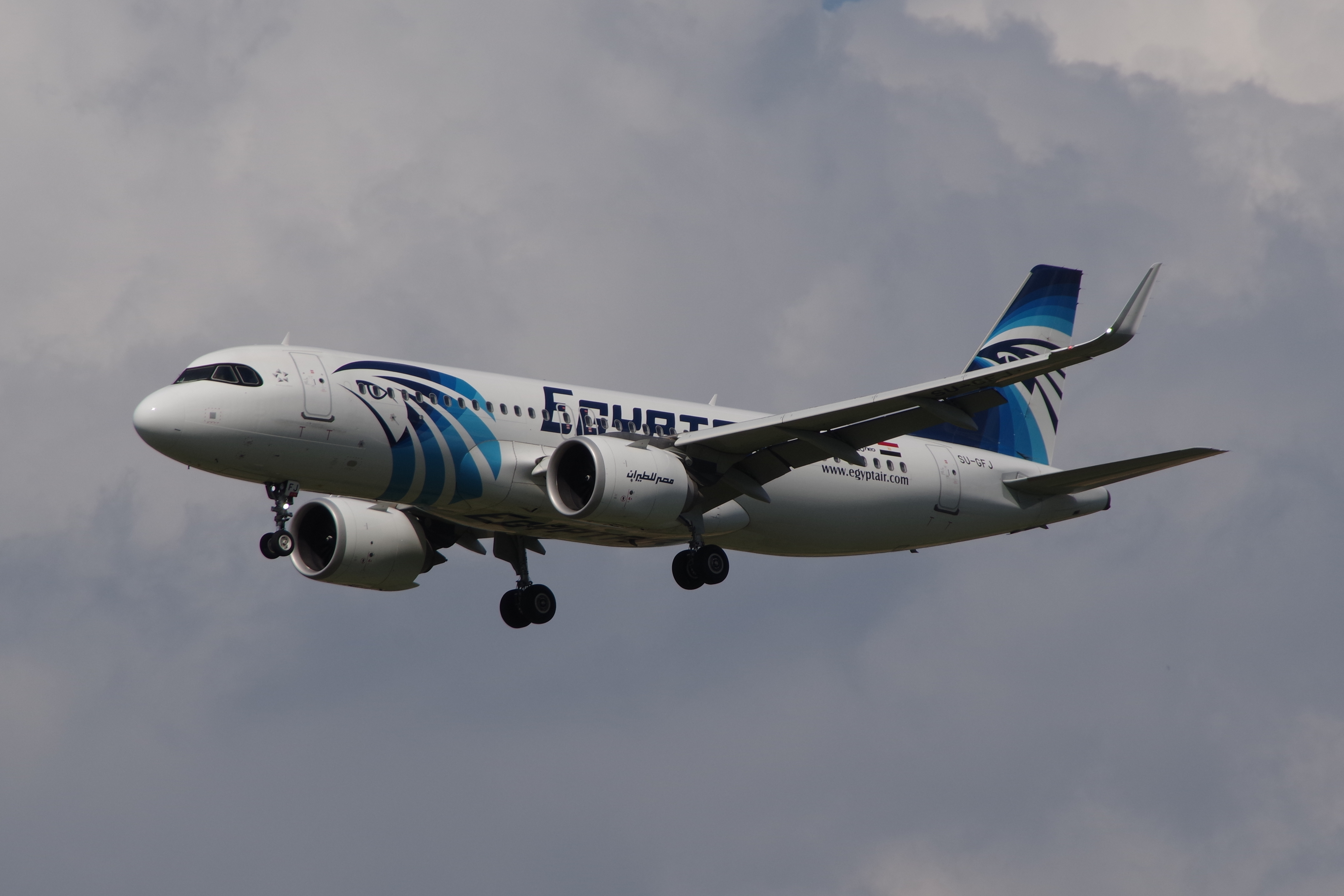
Airbus A320neo

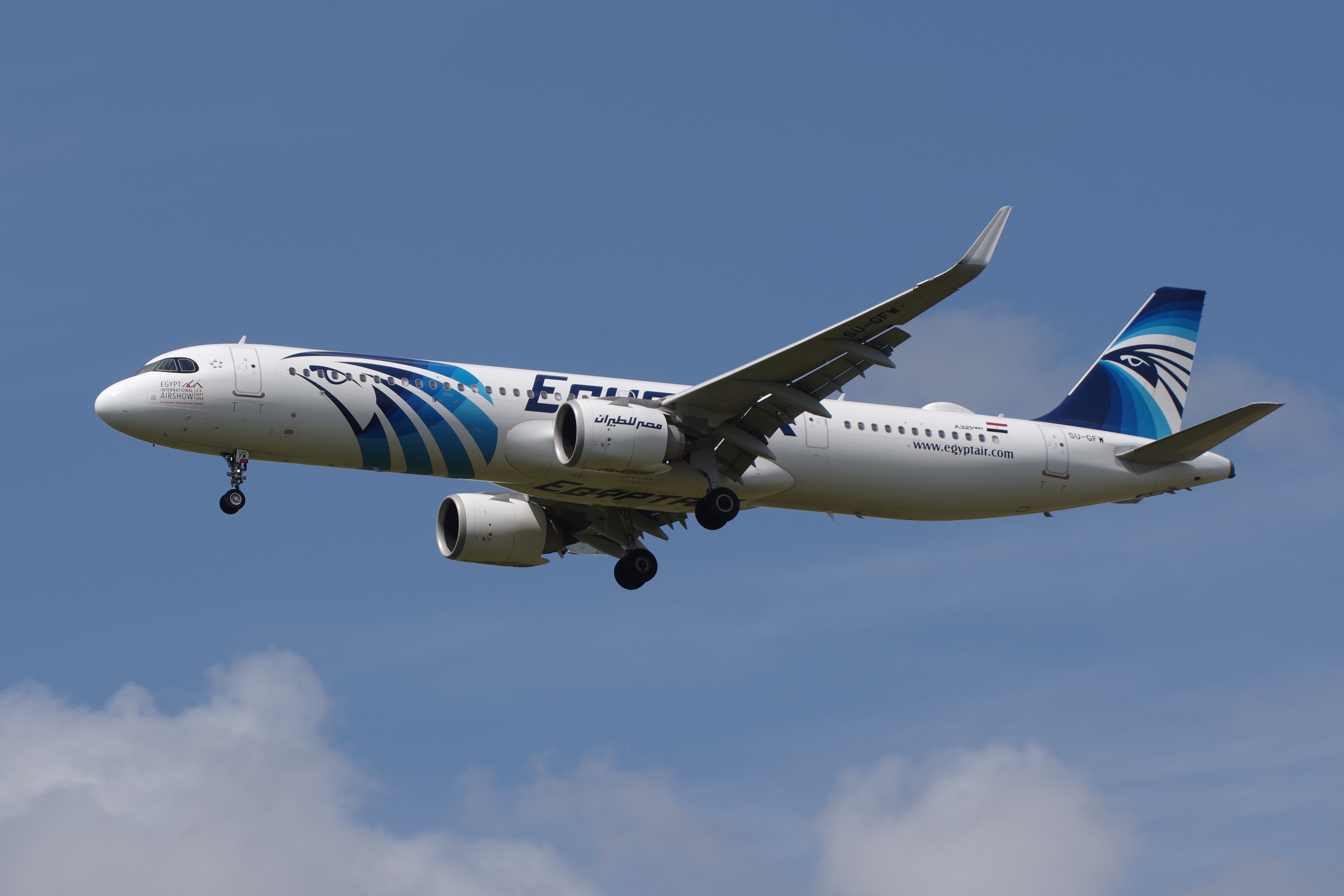
Airbus A321neo

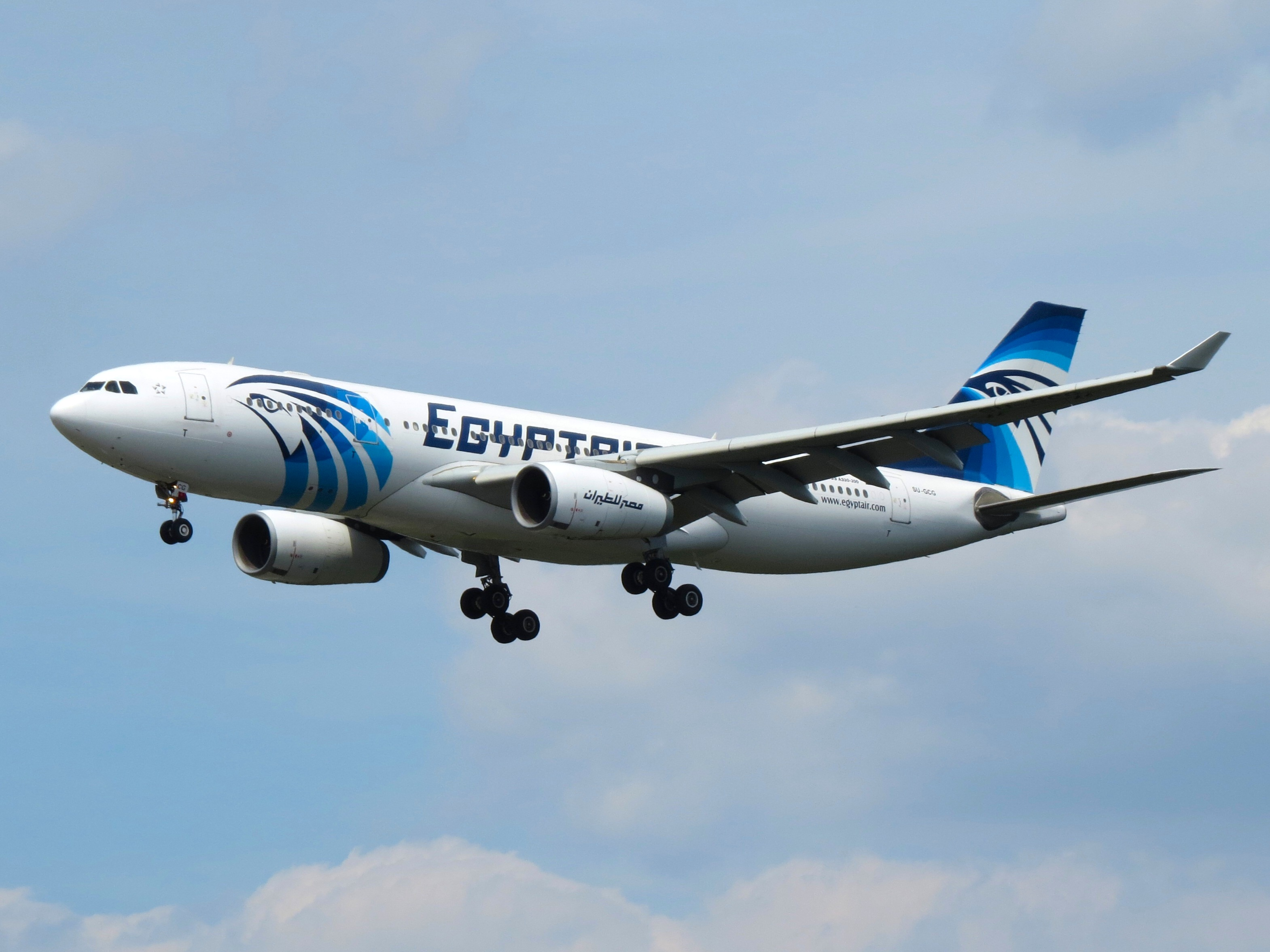
Airbus A330-200

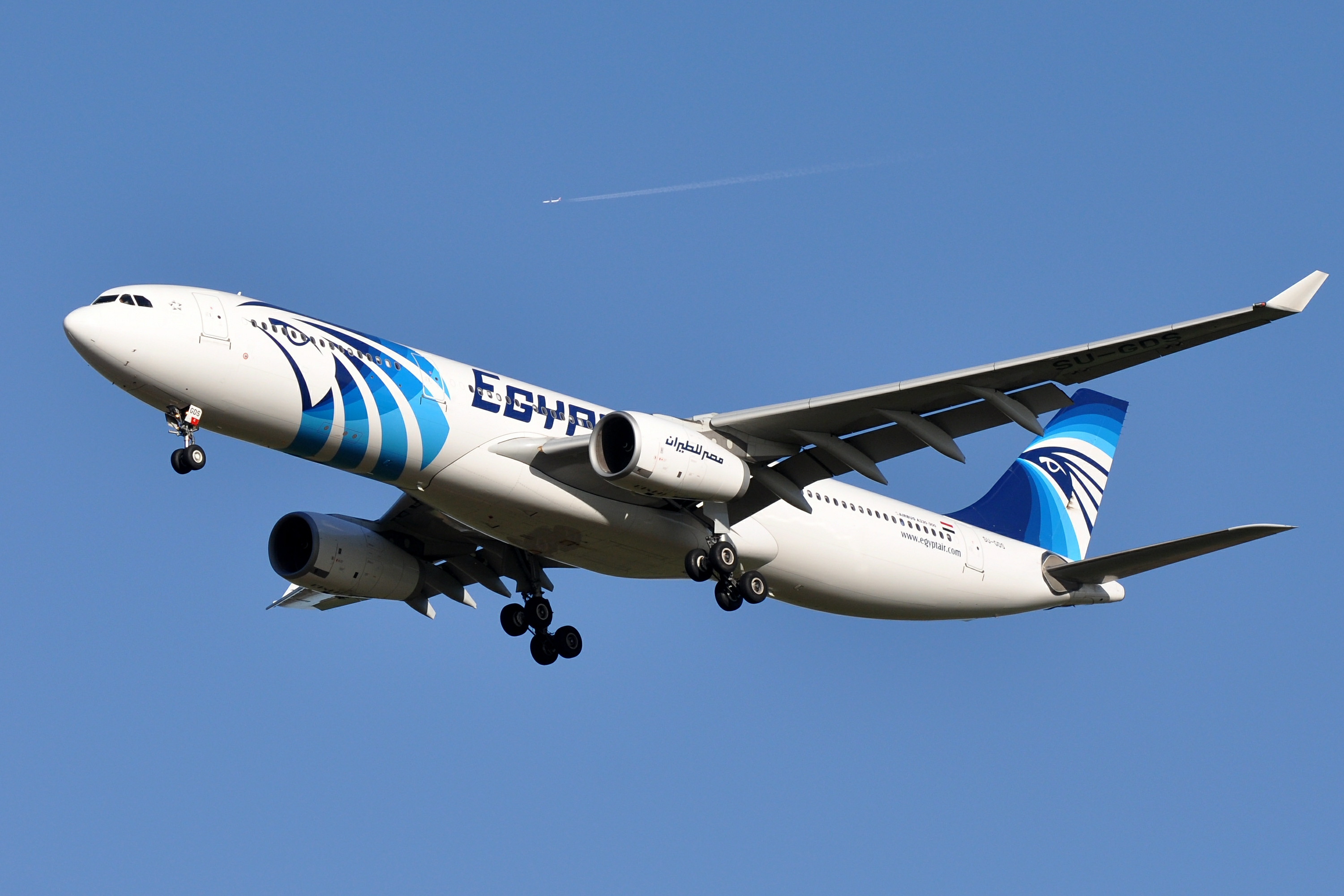
Airbus A330-300

Airbus A350-900

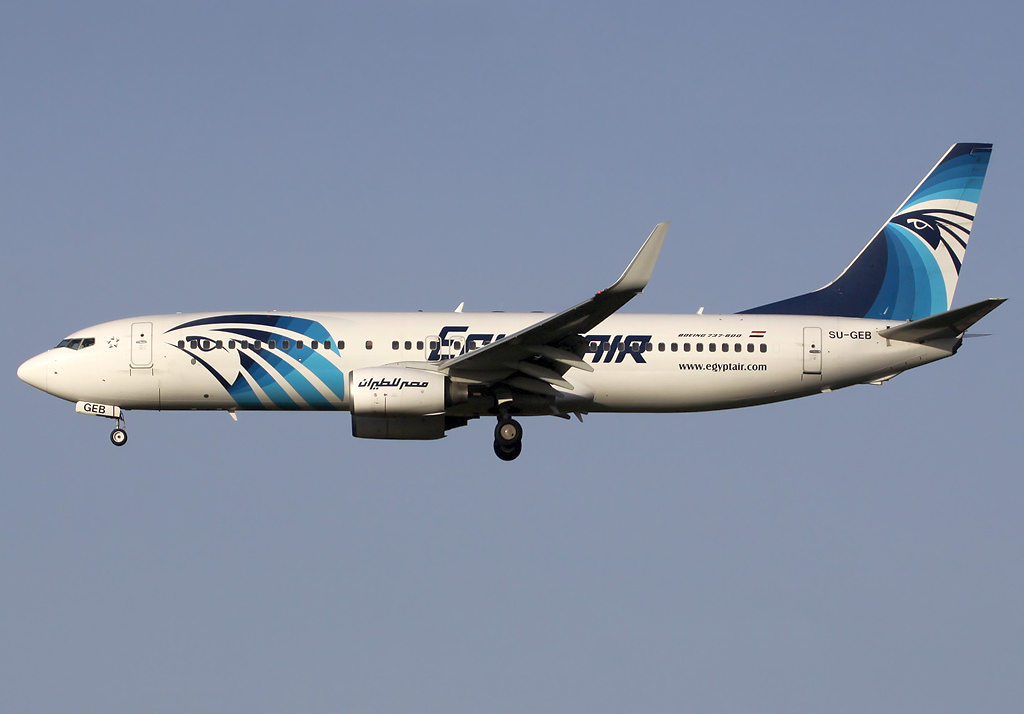
Boeing 737-800

Boeing 777-300ER

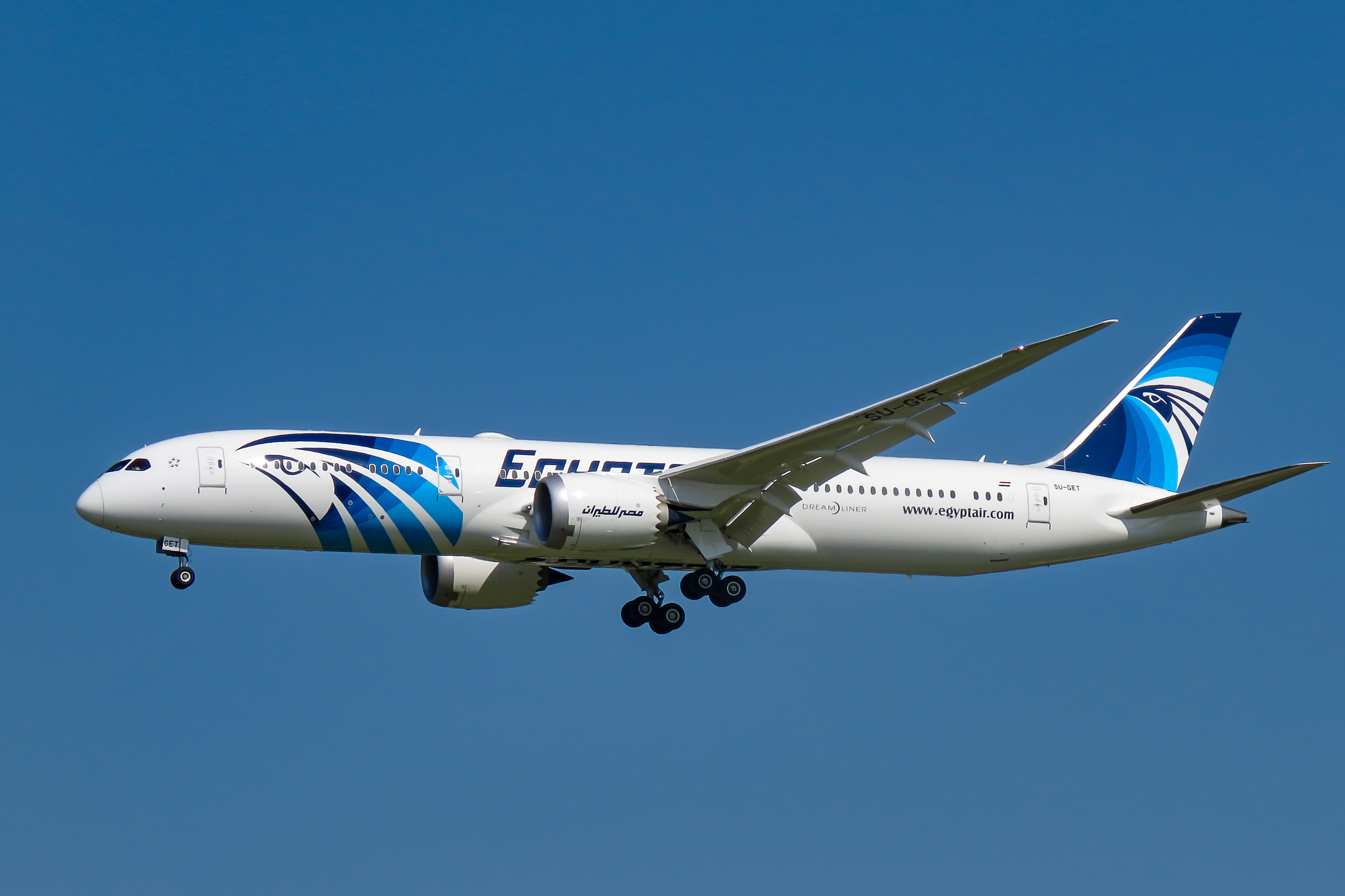
Boeing 787-9

=== Fleet development ===
In June 1995, Egyptair ordered three Airbus A340s, scheduled for delivery in December 1996. The first, 260-seater aircraft entered the fleet in late 1996, and operated along a -300 version that was on lease from Gulf Air. Also in 1995, the carrier purchased three 308-seater Boeing 777-200s for US$400 million. These GE-90 powered aircraft, along with the A340-200s, were ordered for replacement of the Airbus A300B4 and Boeing 767-200 fleet.

Aimed to replace the Airbus A300-600R fleet, the airline placed an order for seven Airbus A330-200 aircraft in early 2003, slated for delivery in June 2004, and cancelled two Airbus A340-600s it had previously ordered. In June 2003, Egyptair signed a deal worth US$150 million with Rolls-Royce for the provision of Trent 700 engines to power these seven A330s. The first Airbus A330-300 was incorporated into the fleet in August 2010.

Egyptair's commercial relationship with Boeing started in 1968 when a Boeing 707 was delivered. Six Boeing 737-800s were acquired in August 2005, with handovers starting in September the following year and a delivery span of three years. On lease from GECAS, Egyptair took delivery of its first 346-seater Boeing 777-300ER in March 2010.

In June 2011, the airframer delivered the airline's 50th Boeing aircraft, a 737-800. In July 2016, Egyptair was identified as the carrier that ordered nine more aircraft of the type, in a deal worth US$864 million. In October 2016 the airline placed a firm order for eight Boeing 737-800s with deliveries starting in February 2017.

In October and November 2017, it was announced that the airline intended to place an order for 6 Boeing 787-9s and 15 Airbus A320neos.

During the 2019 Dubai Airshow, the initial order of 15 Airbus A320neos was changed to seven A321neos and eight A320neos instead. Also, at the same time, two additional Boeing 787-9 were ordered after the sixth and last Boeing 787-9 had been delivered in August of the same year. The airline took delivery of its first, 340-seater Airbus A350-900 in February 2026.

EgyptAir's commitment to the A350-900 totals 16 aircraft: a firm order for ten, announced at the November 2023 Dubai Airshow, was expanded by a further six when options were exercised at the June 2025 Paris Air Show. Seven A350s are expected by the end of 2026, with the remainder delivered through 2030–2033; the type is intended to replace the Boeing 777-300ER fleet, while the Airbus A330 fleet is being retrofitted with the same cabin product. For short- and medium-haul renewal, EgyptAir holds an order for 18 Boeing 737 MAX 8s, leased through Air Lease Corporation, deliveries of which began in 2026.

=== Historical fleet ===
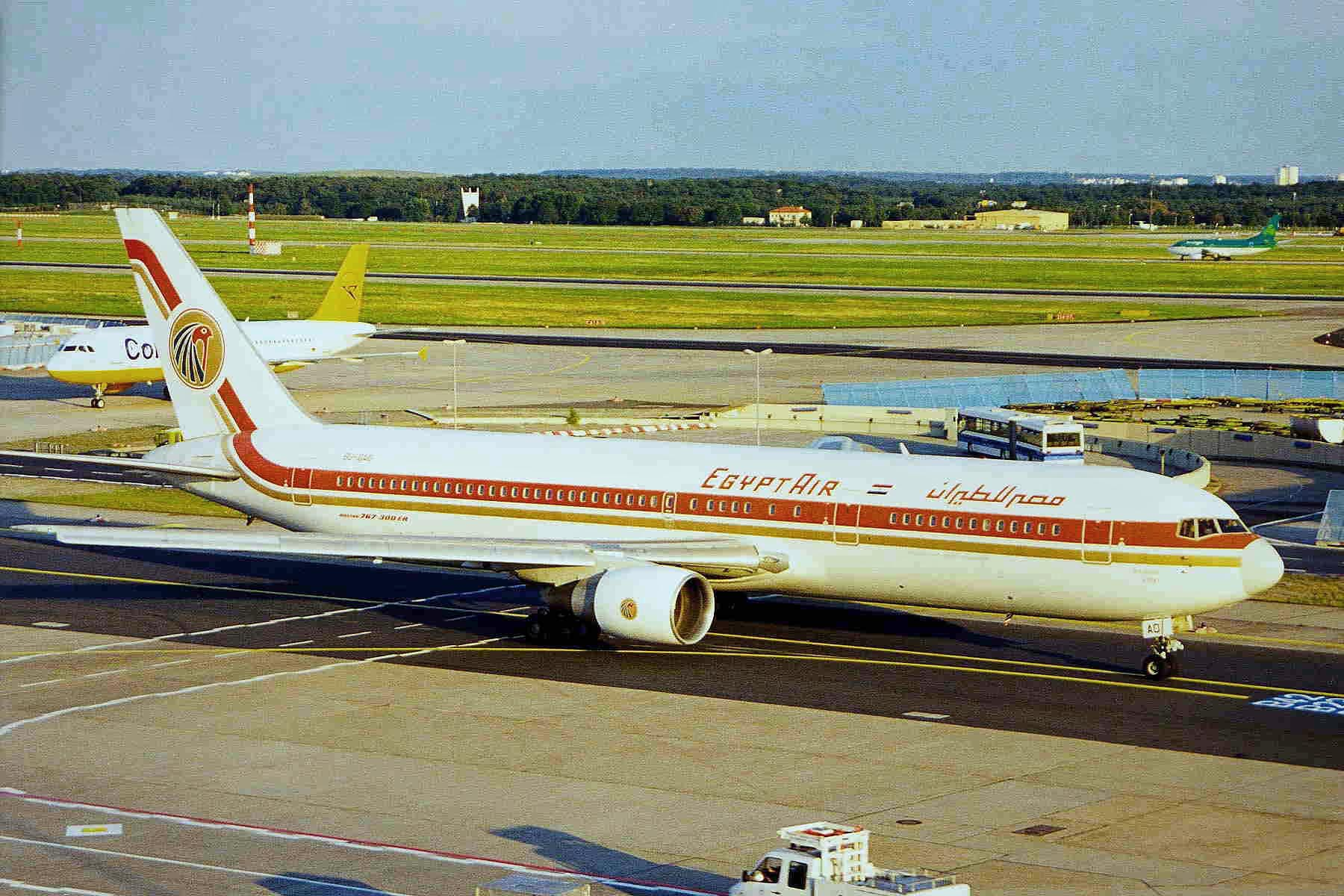
An Egyptair Boeing 767-300ER taxiing at Frankfurt Airport in 1999

Egyptair mainline historical fleet
Aircraft<	Introduced	Retired
Airbus A220-300	2019	2024
Airbus A300-600	1988	2009
Airbus A321-200	1997	2018
Airbus A340-200	1996	2015
Boeing 707-320C	1968	Unknown
Boeing 737-500	1997	2015
Boeing 747-300	1988	2005
Boeing 777-200ER	1997	2018
de Havilland Comet	1960	1976
Ilyushin Il-62	1971	Unknown
Tupolev Tu-154	1973	1974

== Incidents and accidents ==
- On 22 December 1951, SNCASE Languedoc SU-AHH of Misrair crashed west of Tehran, Iran killing all 20 people on board. The aircraft was operating an international scheduled passenger flight from Baghdad, Iraq to Tehran.
- On 30 July 1952, SNCASE Languedoc SU-AHX of Misrair was damaged beyond economic repair in a wheels-up landing at Almaza Air Base, Cairo. The aircraft was operating an international scheduled passenger flight from Almaza to Khartoum Airport, Sudan; it returned to Cairo following a fire in No. 1 engine.
- On 15 December 1953, Misrair Vickers Viking SU-AFK crashed shortly after take-off from Cairo Almaza Airport, killing all six on-board (five crew, one passenger).
- On 1 November 1956, Misrair Vickers Viscount SU-AIC was written off while parked at Almaza Airport due to an air-raid by the RAF during the Suez crisis
- On 29 September 1960, United Arab Airlines Flight 738, a Vickers Viscount SU-AKW crashed into the Mediterranean off Elba, Italy, killing all 21 on board.
- On 19 July 1962, United Arab Airlines Flight 869, a de Havilland Comet, SU-AMW, crashed (CFIT) into Khao Yai mountain, Thailand, killing all 18 passengers and 8 crew.
- On 28 July 1963, United Arab Airlines Flight 869, a de Havilland Comet, SU-ALD, crashed into the sea on approach to Bombay Airport, India, all 63 passengers and crew on board were killed.
- On 18 March 1966, United Arab Airlines Flight 749, an Antonov An-24, crashed while attempting to land at Cairo International Airport. All 30 passengers and crew on board were killed.
- On 20 March 1969, a United Arab Airlines Ilyushin Il-18 SU-APC crashed while attempting to land at Aswan Airport. 100 of the 105 passengers and crew on board were killed in the disaster.
- On 19 March 1972, EgyptAir Flight 763 operated by Douglas DC-9-32 YU-AHR (leased from Inex Adria) crashed into a mountain on approach to Aden International Airport in Yemen killing all 30 passengers and crew on board.
- On 29 January 1973, EgyptAir Flight 741 operated by Ilyushin Il-18 SU-AOV crashed on approach to Nicosia International Airport, killing all 37 people on board.
- On 10 July 1974, SU-AXB a Tupolev Tu-154 on a training flight crashed near Cairo Airport, killing four Soviet instructors and two Egyptair pilots.
- On 25 December 1976, EgyptAir Flight 864 operated by Boeing 707 SU-AXA crashed into an industrial complex in Bangkok, Thailand. All 52 persons on board plus 19 people on the ground were killed.
- On 17 October 1982, Egyptair Flight 771 operated by Boeing 707 SU-APE crashed on landing at Geneva Airport, Switzerland. There were no fatalities, however, the aircraft was damaged beyond repair.
- On 10 October 1985, EgyptAir Flight 2843 operated by a Boeing 737 and carrying individuals responsible for the Achille Lauro hijacking was intercepted by US war planes and forced to land in Sigonella, Italy while en route to Tunisia.
- On 23 November 1985, EgyptAir Flight 648 operated by a Boeing 737 was hijacked to Malta International Airport by three men from the Abu Nidal terrorist group. Omar Rezaq was among them. An Egyptian Sky Marshall on board shot and killed one of the hijackers before being gunned down himself. After several hours of negotiations, Egyptian troops stormed the aircraft and battled with the hijackers, who threw several hand grenades and shot and killed five passengers. The aircraft was severely damaged by the explosions and fire. Two of the six crew members and 59 of the 90 passengers were killed.
- On 21 September 1987, SU-BCA, an Airbus A300 crashed at Luxor International Airport during a training flight, killing all five crew members on board. It was the first fatal accident involving an Airbus A300.
- On 31 October 1999, EgyptAir Flight 990, a Boeing 767 (SU-GAP) en route from Los Angeles to Cairo (with a stopover in New York City) crashed into the Atlantic Ocean off the coast of Nantucket; all 217 passengers were killed. The relief first officer of the flight, Gameel Al-Batouti, was suspected by U.S. authorities of making flight control inputs that lead to the crash, though it could not be determined why he did so. Egyptian officials have strongly disputed that claim.
- On 7 May 2002, EgyptAir Flight 843, a Boeing 737-500, crashed into terrain in heavy rain, fog, and a sandstorm on its approach to Tunis, Tunisia, killing 15 of 64 occupants.
- On 29 July 2011, EgyptAir Flight 667, a Boeing 777-200ER, sustained substantial damage in a cockpit fire at Cairo International Airport (CAI). The probable cause for the accident was identified as an electrical fault or circuit. All passengers and crew were able to escape. The plane (SU-GBP) was damaged beyond repair.
- On 29 March 2016, EgyptAir Flight 181, operated by Airbus A320-232 (SU-GCB) was hijacked while on a Flight from Borg El Arab Airport, Alexandria to Cairo International Airport. The aircraft, with 81 passengers on board, landed at Larnaca International Airport, Cyprus, where all hostages were released and the hijacker surrendered to authorities.
- On 19 May 2016, EgyptAir Flight 804, an Airbus A320-232 (SU-GCC) en route from Paris to Cairo crashed into the Mediterranean Sea, killing all 66 on board. A 2022 investigation by France's Bureau of Enquiry and Analysis for Civil Aviation Safety (BEA) has found that the cause of the crash was a cockpit fire, started as a result of the pilot's cigarette smoke combining with the oxygen of a leaking mask. On the other hand, a report published on 30 October 2024 by Egypt's Civil Aviation Authority concluded that the crash was the result of an explosion in the galley area behind the cockpit. The subsequent fire spread rapidly resulting in multiple systems failure. This theory was rejected by the BEA which concluded that the fire was the result of a fault in the oxygen mask.

== See also ==
- Transport in Egypt

== Bibliography ==
- Guttery, Ben R. (1998). Encyclopedia of African Airlines. Jefferson, NC: McFarland & Company. ISBN 978-0-7864-0495-7.
- Mols, Jozef (2023). Egyptair: Weathering Storms. Airlines Series, Vol. 14. Stamford, Lincs, UK: Key Publishing. ISBN 9781802823851.
