= Biman Bangladesh Airlines Flight 060 =

2019 aviation accident in Myanmar

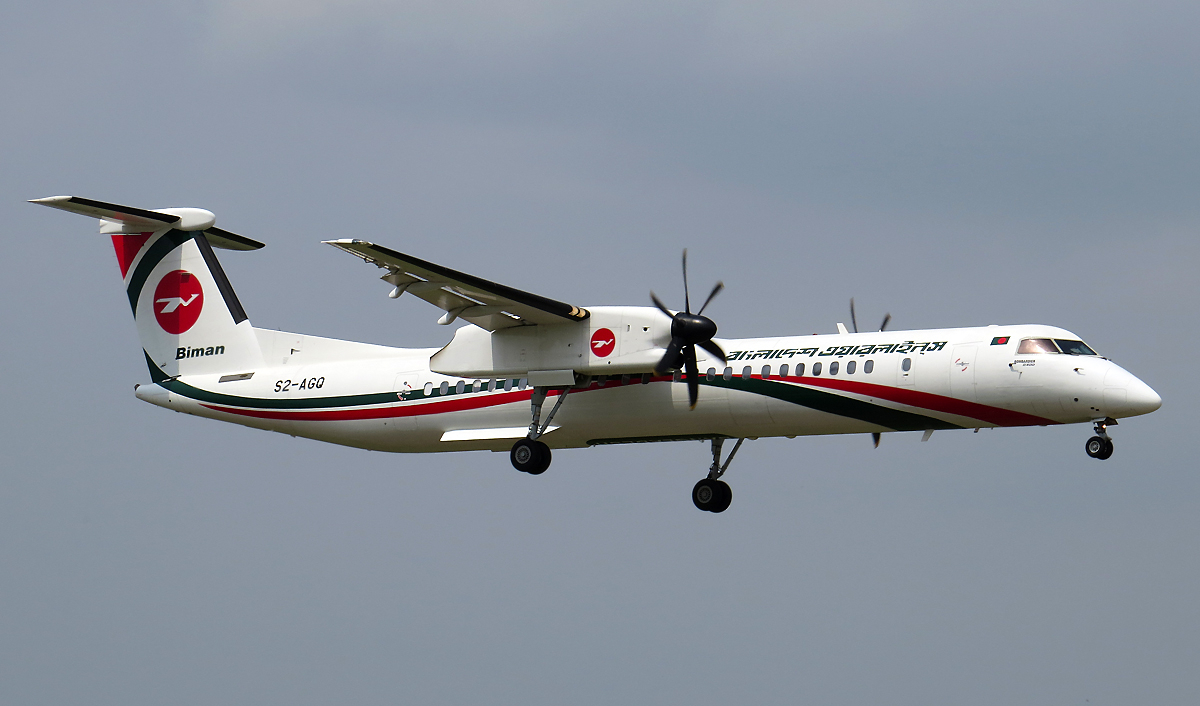
- S2-AGQ, the aircraft involved in the accident, seen in 2015

Accident
- Date: May 8, 2019
- Summary: Runway excursion due to unstabilized approach and pilot error
- Site: Yangon International Airport, Yangon, Myanmar

Aircraft
- Aircraft type: de Havilland Canada DHC-8-402Q Dash 8
- Operator: Biman Bangladesh Airlines
- IATA flight No.: BG060
- ICAO flight No.: BBC060
- Call sign: BANGLADESH 60
- Registration: S2-AGQ
- Flight origin: Dhaka Hazrat Shah Jalal International Airport, Dhaka, Bangladesh
- Destination: Yangon International Airport, Yangon, Myanmar
- Occupants: 33
- Passengers: 28
- Crew: 5
- Fatalities: 0
- Injuries: 20
- Survivors: 33

Biman Bangladesh Airlines Flight 060 was a scheduled international passenger flight from Dhaka Hazrat Shah Jalal International Airport, Bangladesh to Yangon International Airport, Myanmar. On May 8, 2019, the Bombardier Q400 aircraft skidded off the runway upon landing, breaking into three sections. There were no fatalities, but 18 of the 28 passengers on board including 5 crew members were injured: the aircraft was also declared a hull loss, making it the tenth hull loss of a Q400 aircraft.

== Aircraft involved ==
The accident aircraft held the registration number S2-AGQ. The aircraft was delivered to Smart Aviation Company in 2011 with registration SU-SMH and was leased to Biman Bangladesh Airlines in April 2015.

== Incident ==
In the early afternoon of May 8, 2019, at around 15:15 local time, Biman Bangladesh Airlines Flight 060 took off from Dhaka on a scheduled passenger flight to Yangon in Myanmar. At the time of the accident, there was a thunderstorm in the area and the weather was very poor.

When the aircraft rolled out for landing, for unknown reasons it deviated from its course and veered off the 2.1-mile long runway into the grass next to it. The impact caused the aircraft to snap into three sections just behind the forward passenger door and the rear service door. The undercarriage collapsed and the right-wing was substantially damaged at the base.

The plane sustained serious damage and was declared a hull loss, but no fire broke out, and there were no fatalities. However, 20 passengers and crew were reported injured.

== Investigation ==
Myanmar's Aircraft Accident Investigation Bureau launched an investigation into the accident. The final report concluded that the flight crew had failed to initiate a go-around following an unstabilized approach. The runway excursion was caused by the flight crew switching the propellers into beta range mode.
