= EgyptAir Flight 864 =

1976 aviation accident in Thailand

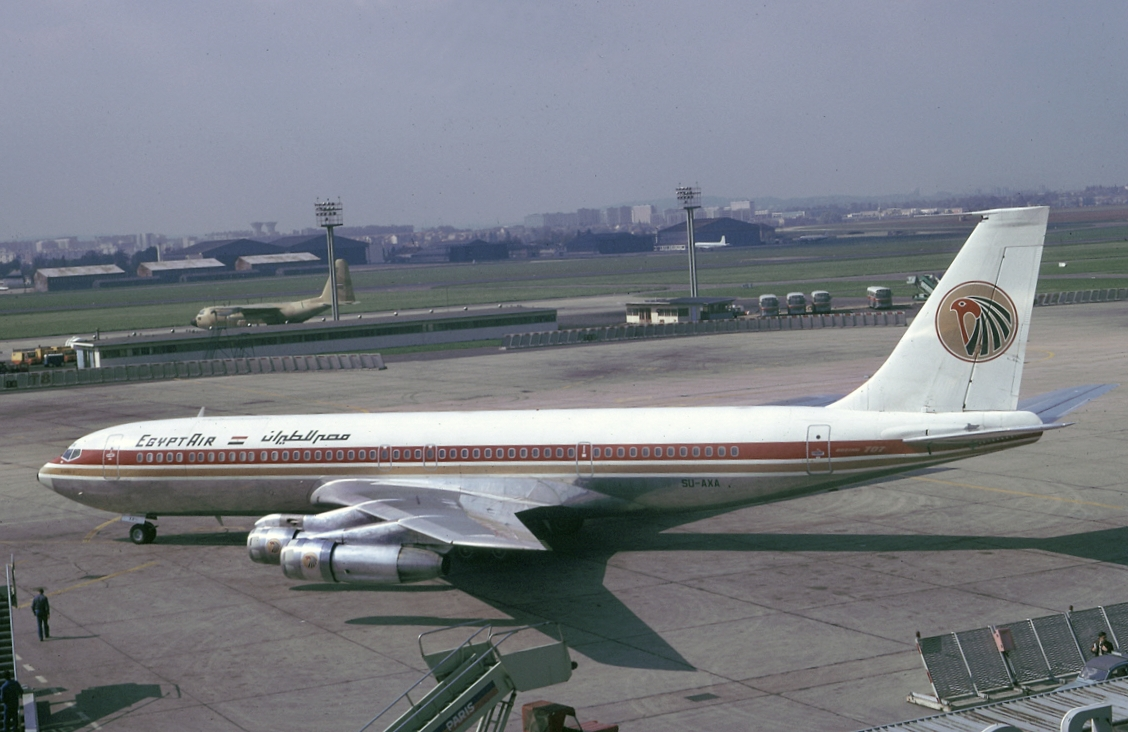
- SU-AXA, the aircraft involved in the accident, pictured in 1974

Accident
- Date: 25 December 1976
- Summary: Controlled flight into terrain due to pilot error
- Site: Don Mueang International Airport, Bangkok, Thailand; 13.956°N 100.619°E
- Total fatalities: 71

Aircraft
- Aircraft type: Boeing 707-366C
- Aircraft name: Ramesses II
- Operator: EgyptAir
- IATA flight No.: MS864
- ICAO flight No.: MSR864
- Call sign: EGYPTAIR 864
- Registration: SU-AXA
- Flight origin: Rome Fiumicino Airport, Italy
- 1st stopover: Cairo International Airport, Egypt
- 2nd stopover: Santacruz Airport, India
- Last stopover: Don Mueang International Airport, Thailand
- Destination: Tokyo International Airport, Japan
- Occupants: 52
- Passengers: 43
- Crew: 9
- Fatalities: 52
- Survivors: 0

Ground casualties
- Ground fatalities: 19

EgyptAir Flight 864 was an international scheduled passenger flight from Rome Fiumicino Airport to Tokyo International Airport, via Cairo, Bombay, and Bangkok. On 25 December 1976, the Boeing 707 crashed into an industrial complex in Bangkok. All 52 people on board were killed, and 19 plus on the ground in the crash.

== Aircraft ==
The aircraft was a Boeing 707-366C that had its maiden flight on 25 August 1973. The aircraft was registered as SU-AXA and was delivered to EgyptAir, and entered service on 20 September the same year. The aircraft was powered by Pratt & Whitney JT3D-7 turbofan engines.

== Accident ==
Flight 864 was a regularly scheduled international passenger flight from Rome to Tokyo with stopovers in Cairo, Bombay and Bangkok. With 9 crew members and 43 passengers on board, flight 864 approached Bangkok. At 20:30 GMT (03:30 local time), the crew contacted the approach controller and reported about the distance of 33 nautical miles (38 mi; 61 km) from the airport’s radio beacon. At this time, conditions were reported as calm, with cloudiness from 2/8 to 4/8 at the lower border of 300 metres (980 ft), air temperature of 25 °C (77 °F) at a dew point of 24 °C (75 °F), visibility of 4,000 metres (13,000 ft), and an airfield pressure of 1007 mB. Having received the radar vector to the "BK" non-directional beacon (NDB), the crew began their approach to runway 21L. The crew reported their observations. The controller cleared the flight to land, and the crew acknowledged the transmission. Then at about 03:45, the aircraft crashed into a weaving mill building in an industrial area of the city, located two kilometres (1.2 mi; 1.1 nmi) northeast of the end of runway 21L. The aircraft exploded on impact, and all 52 people on board were killed. The weaving mill was also destroyed, with 19 people killed on the ground. The total number of victims was 71 people. At that time, the crash was the deadliest aviation disaster to occur in Thailand (it is now the sixth).

== Cause ==
Pilot error was determined to be the cause of the crash. EgyptAir claimed that the Bangkok control tower had provided inadequate weather information to the crew of Flight 864. The crew had also reduced the aircraft's vertical speed and did not monitor its height properly.
