= EgyptAir Flight 763 =

1972 aviation accident in South Yemen

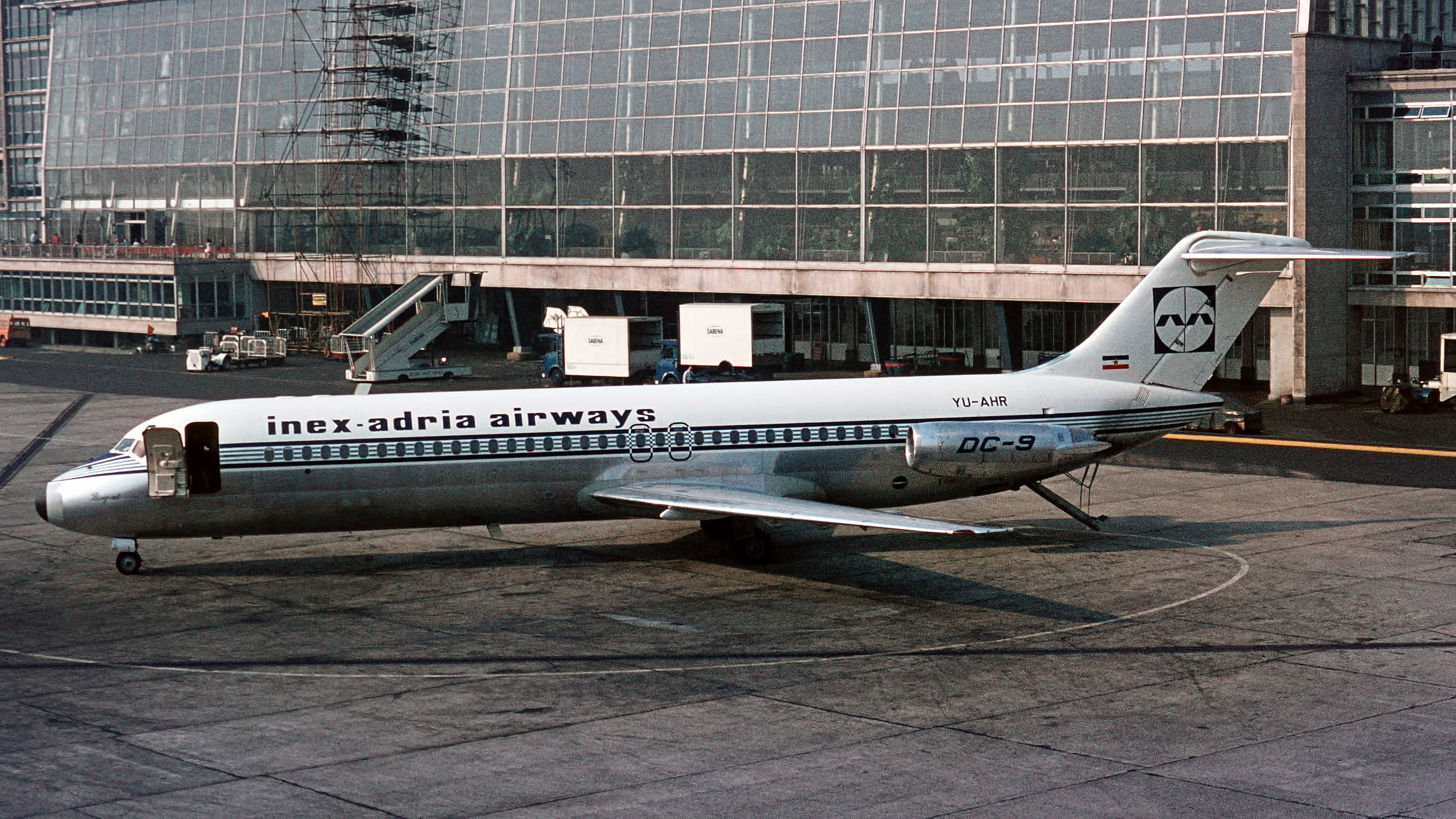
- YU-AHR, the aircraft involved in the accident, seen in 1970

Accident
- Date: 19 March 1972
- Summary: Controlled flight into terrain
- Site: Jebel Shamsan, near Aden International Airport, Aden, South Yemen; 12.7656°N 45.0169°E

Aircraft
- Aircraft type: McDonnell Douglas DC-9-32
- Operator: Inex-Adria Airways on behalf of EgyptAir
- IATA flight No.: MS763
- ICAO flight No.: MSR763
- Call sign: EGYPTAIR 763
- Registration: YU-AHR
- Flight origin: Cairo International Airport, Cairo, Egypt
- Stopover: Jeddah International Airport, Jeddah, Saudi Arabia
- Destination: Aden International Airport, Aden, South Yemen
- Occupants: 30
- Passengers: 21
- Crew: 9
- Fatalities: 30
- Survivors: 0

EgyptAir Flight 763 was an international non-scheduled passenger flight from Cairo, Egypt, to Aden, South Yemen. On 19 March 1972 it crashed into the Shamsan Mountains on approach to Aden, killing all 30 people on board.

== Aircraft ==
The aircraft involved was a McDonnell Douglas DC-9-32, built in 1970 as construction number (MSN) 47503, and registered to Inex Adria in Yugoslavia as YU-AHR.

== Accident ==
On 19 March 1972, EgyptAir Flight 763 was on a flight from Cairo International Airport in Egypt to Aden International Airport in the People's Democratic Republic of Yemen (South Yemen), via Jeddah, Saudi Arabia. The aircraft was leased from the Yugoslav airline Inex Adria and had 21 passengers and 9 crew members on board. Flight 763 was on a visual approach to land on runway 08 into Aden International Airport when the aircraft struck Jebel Shamsan, the highest peak of Aden Crater, an extinct volcano, located 7 kilometres (4.3 mi; 3.8 nmi) from the airport. On impact the aircraft burned, killing all on board. At the time of the accident, it was the deadliest to have occurred in South Yemen. As of 2025, it remains the deadliest civil aviation accident and the second deadliest aviation accident to have occurred in Yemen.
