= EgyptAir Flight 741 =

1973 plane crash in Cyprus

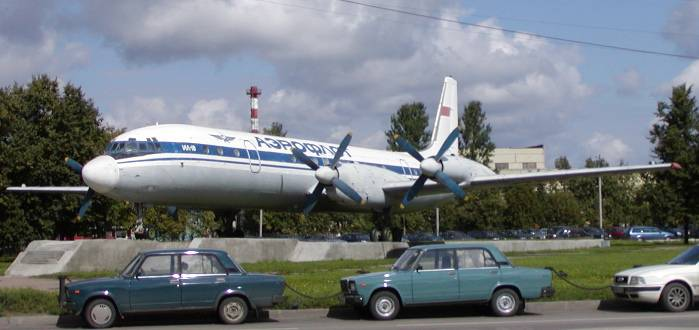
- Museum example of an Ilyushin Il-18

Accident
- Date: 29 January 1973
- Summary: Crash on approach
- Site: Kyrenia Mountain Range; 35°19′38″N 33°13′1″E

Aircraft
- Aircraft type: Ilyushin Il-18D
- Operator: EgyptAir
- Registration: SU-AOV
- Flight origin: Cairo International Airport
- Destination: Nicosia International Airport
- Occupants: 37
- Passengers: 30
- Crew: 7
- Fatalities: 37
- Survivors: 0

EgyptAir Flight 741 was a flight between Cairo International Airport and the now-defunct Nicosia International Airport that crashed on 29 January 1973. All 37 people on board died.

The plane crashed in the Kyrenia mountain range in Cyprus on its descent while approaching the runway from the north. The resulting explosion, about 12 miles (19 km) from Nicosia airport, resulted in a fire which was put out by the Cypriot National Guard. The turboprop hit the mountain at an altitude of 783 metres (2,569 ft) (117 metres (384 ft) below the crest). The black box of the aircraft was analyzed in Moscow.

== Passengers ==
Nationality	Passengers	Crew	Total
United Kingdom	14	0	14
Egypt	3	7	10
United States	7	0	7
Sweden	2	0	2
Canada	1	0	1
Ireland	1	0	1
France	1	0	1
Jordan	1	0	1
Total	30	7	37
