= List of companies of Egypt =

Location of Egypt

Egypt is a transcontinental country spanning the northeast corner of Africa and southwest corner of Asia by a land bridge formed by the Sinai Peninsula. Egypt's economy depends mainly on agriculture, media, petroleum imports, natural gas, and tourism.

The completion of the Aswan High Dam in 1970 and the resultant Lake Nasser have altered the time-honoured place of the Nile River in the agriculture and ecology of Egypt. A rapidly growing population, limited arable land, and dependence on the Nile all continue to overtax resources and stress the economy.

For further information on the types of business entities in this country and their abbreviations, see "Business entities in Egypt".

== Notable firms ==
This list includes notable companies with primary headquarters located in the country. The industry and sector follow the Industry Classification Benchmark taxonomy. Organizations which have ceased operations are included and noted as defunct.

Notable companies Status: P=Private, S=State; A=Active, D=Defunct
Name	Industry	Sector	Headquarters	Founded	Notes	Status	
ABU QIR Fertilizers and Chemicals Industries Company	Basic materials	Commodity chemicals	Abu Qir	1976	Agriculture, nitrogen fertilizers	S	A
Air Arabia Egypt	Consumer services	Airlines	Alexandria	2009	Low-cost carrier	P	A
Air Cairo	Consumer services	Airlines	Cairo	2003	Low-cost carrier	P	A
Air Memphis	Consumer services	Airlines	Cairo	1995	Charter airline, defunct 2013	P	D
Air Sinai	Consumer services	Airlines	Cairo	1982	Airline	S	A
Al Watany Bank of Egypt	Financials	Banks	Cairo	1980	Bank, part of National Bank of Kuwait	P	A
Al-Mansour Automotive	Consumer goods	Automobiles	Alexandria	1975	Vehicles	P	A
AlMasria Universal Airlines	Consumer services	Airlines	Cairo	2008	Private airline	P	A
AMC Airlines	Consumer services	Airlines	Cairo	1992	Charter airline	P	A
Arab Contractors	Industrials	Heavy construction	Cairo	1955	Construction	S	A
Alexbank	Financials	Banks	Alexandria	1957	Bank	P	A
Banque du Caire	Financials	Banks	Cairo	1952	Bank	S	A
Banque Misr	Financials	Banks	Cairo	1920	Bank	S	A
Bavarian Auto Group	Consumer goods	Automobiles	Cairo	2003	Egyptian arm of BMW (Germany)	P	A
BiscoMisr	Consumer goods	Food products	Cairo	1957	Baked goods	P	A
Cairo Aviation	Consumer services	Airlines	Cairo	1998	Airline	P	A
Cairo Electric Railways and Heliopolis Oases Company	Industrials	Railroads	Cairo	1960	Transportation	P	A
Central Bank of Egypt	Financials	Banks	Cairo	1961	Central bank	S	A
Cook Door	Consumer services	Restaurants & bars	Cairo	1988	Fast food	P	A
Daily News Egypt	Consumer services	Publishing	Giza	2005	Newspaper	P	A
Egyptian Electricity Holding Company	Utilities	Conventional electricity	Cairo	2000	Power	S	A
Egyptian Natural Gas Holding Company	Oil & gas	Exploration & production	Cairo	2001	State-owned oil and gas holdings, owned by Egyptian General Petroleum Corporation	S	A
Egyptian General Petroleum Corporation	Oil & gas	Exploration & production	Cairo	1956	State petroleum	S	A
Egypt Post	Industrials	Delivery services	Cairo	1865	Post, shipping	S	A
EgyptAir	Consumer services	Airlines	Cairo	1933	Airline, state flag carrier	S	A
EgyptAir Cargo	Industrials	Delivery services	Cairo	2002	Cargo airline, part of EgyptAir	S	A
EgyptAir Express	Consumer services	Airlines	Cairo	2006	Regional airline, part of EgyptAir	S	A
Egyptian International Beverage Company	Consumer goods	Brewers	Cairo	2003	Brewery	P	A
Egyptian National Railways	Industrials	Railroads	Cairo	1854	Railway	S	A
Elsewedy Electric	Conglomerate	Consumer goods	Cairo	1938	Consumer electronics	P	A
EUC Construction – El Hazek	Industrials	Heavy construction	Cairo	1979	Construction	P	A
Ezz Steel	Basic materials	Iron & steel	Cairo	1982	Steel	P	A
General Motors Egypt	Consumer goods	Automobiles	Cairo	1983	Egyptian arm of General Motors (US)	P	A
GB Corp	Consumer goods	Automobiles	Cairo	1960	Automobiles	P	A
Hassan Allam Holding	Industrials	Heavy construction	Cairo	1975	Construction	P	A
HSBC Bank Egypt	Financials	Banks	Cairo	1982	Bank, part of HSBC (UK)	P	A
Juhayna Food Industries	Consumer goods	Food products	Cairo	1983	Dairy products and juice	P	A
Manufacturing Commercial Vehicles	Industrials	Commercial vehicles & trucks	Cairo	1994	Commercial vehicles	P	A
Microsoft Egypt	Technology	Software	Cairo	1995	Part of Microsoft (US)	P	A
Midwest Airlines	Consumer services	Airlines	Cairo	1998	Charter airline	P	A
Nasr	Consumer goods	Automobiles	Cairo	1960	State-owned, vehicles	S	A
National Bank of Egypt	Financials	Banks	Cairo	1898	Bank	S	A
Nile Air	Consumer services	Airlines	Cairo	2006	Airline	P	A
Nilesat	Telecommunications	Mass telecommunications	Cairo	1998	Satellites	S	A
Orange Egypt	Telecommunications	Mobile telecommunications	Cairo	1996	Formerly Mobinil, part of Orange S.A. (France)	P	A
Orascom Construction	Industrials	Heavy construction	Cairo	1950	Construction	P	A
Petroleum Air Services	Oil & gas	Oil equipment & services	Cairo	1982	Oil industry support	S	A
SEGAS LNG	Oil & gas	Exploration & production	Damietta	2001	Gas liquied complex	P	A
SICO Technology	Consumer goods	Consumer electronics	Cairo	2003	Mobile phones, tablets, telecommunication equipment	P	A
Smart Aviation Company	Consumer services	Travel & tourism	Cairo	2007	Corporate travel	P	A
Suez Canal Container Terminal	Industrials	Transportation services	Port Said	2000	transportation terminal	P	A
TA Telecom	Telecommunications	Mobile telecommunications	Cairo	2000	Mobile network, advertising	P	A
Talaat Moustafa Group	Conglomerates	-	Cairo	1975	Agriculture, construction, manufacturing, real estate	P	A
Telecom Egypt	Telecommunications	Fixed line telecommunications	Cairo	1854	Fixed line, ISP	S	A
The Egyptian Gazette	Consumer services	Publishing	Cairo	1880	Newspaper	P	A
Travco Group	Consumer services	Travel & tourism	Cairo	1979	Tourism	P	A
Tristar Air	Industrials	Delivery services	Cairo	1998	Cargo airline, defunct 2015	P	D
Vodafone Egypt	Telecommunications	Mobile telecommunications	Cairo	1998	Part of Vodafone (UK)	P	A

== See also ==
- Economy of Egypt
- List of airlines of Egypt
- List of banks in Egypt
