= List of defunct airlines of Egypt =

This is a list of defunct airlines of Egypt.

| Airline | Image | IATA | ICAO | Callsign | Commenced operations | Ceased operations | Notes |
|---|---|---|---|---|---|---|---|
| Air Alexandrie | | | | | 1980 | 1981 | Operated Sud Aviation Caravelle |
| Air Cargo Egypt | | CC | IAK | AIR CARGO EGYPT | 1978 | 1981 | Operated Douglas DC-8 |
| Air Go Airlines | | | | | 2013 | 2016 | Operated Airbus A320-200 |
| Air Italy Egypt | | | EUD | | 2009 | 2009 | Subsidiary of Air Italy. Operated Boeing 737-800 |
| Air Lease Egypt | | CC | | | 1982 | 1984 | Renamed to Misr Overseas Airways. Operated Boeing 707 |
| Air Leisure | | AL | ALD | AIR LEISURE | 2014 | 2018 | |
| Air Memphis | | E9 | MHS | AIR MEMPHIS | 1995 | 2013 | |
| ALIM Air Lines | | | LEM | | 1993 | 1997 | Operated Ilyushin Il-62 |
| AMC Aviation | | 9V | AMV | | 1994 | 2005 | Rebranded as AMC Airlines. Operated MD-83 |
| Arabia International Airlines | | KK | | | 1979 | 1981 | Operated Boeing 737 |
| Aviator | | T9 | AVV | | 2015 | 2017 | Operated Airbus A320, Boeing 737-500 |
| Cairo Air Transport Company | | CJ | CCE | | 1991 | 1992 | Renamed to Cairo Aviation |
| Cairo Aviation | | | CCE | | 1998 | 2018 | |
| Egypt Air Charter | | | | | 1978 | 1979 | |
| EgyptAir Express | | MSE | MS | EGYPTAIR EXPRESS | 2006 | 2019 | Merged with EgyptAir |
| Egyptian-Kuwait Air Services Company | | | | | 1991 | 1992 | Renamed to Shorouk Air |
| Euro Mediterranean Airlines | | | EUD | | 2007 | 2009 | Renamed to Air Italy Egypt. Operated Boeing 757 |
| Fastlink Egypt | | | | | 2006 | 2006 | |
| Flash Airlines | | | FSH | FLASH | 2001 | 2004 | |
| Heliopolis Airlines | | | HEP | | 1996 | 2001 | Rebranded as Flash Airlines |
| International Air Cargo Corporation | | CC | IAK | AIR CARGO EGYPT | 1977 | 1979 | |
| Koral Blue Airlines | | K7 | KBR | KORALBLUE | 2006 | 2011 | Operated Airbus A319-100, Airbus A320-200, Boeing 737-300 |
| Lotus Air | | T2 | TAS | LOTUS FLOWER | 1998 | 2011 | |
| Luxor Air | | | LXO | | 1999 | 2008 | |
| Mediterranean Airlines | | | MDY | | 1999 | 2001 | Operated Boeing 737-300 |
| Midwest Airlines | | WV | MWA | | 1998 | 2013 | |
| Misr Airlines | | | | | 1932 | 1949 | Renamed to Misrair |
| Misr Overseas Airways | | MO | MOS | | 1984 | 1989 | Established as Air Lease Egypt in 1981. Operated Boeing 707-323C |
| Misrair | | | | | 1949 | 1957 | Renamed to United Arab Airlines |
| National Aviation | | | GTY | | 1986 | 2002 | Operated Boeing 707-366C |
| National Overseas Airline Company | | | NOL | NAT AIRLINE | 1979 | 1982 | |
| Nefertiti Airlines | | | | | 1980 | 1982 | |
| Nile Delta Air Service | | NE | | | 1977 | 1993 | Operated Douglas DC-3 |
| Nile Valley Aviation | | VV | | | 1978 | 1979 | |
| North African Airways | | | NAA | | 1980 | 1989 | |
| Orca Air | | 4D | ORK | ORCA TAXI | 1996 | 2003 | |
| Perfect Air Tours | | | | | 1975 | 1976 | Boeing 707-321B |
| Pharaoh Airlines | | | PHR | | 1998 | 2003 | Operated Boeing 737-200, Boeing 737-400 |
| Pyramid Airlines | | | PYR | PYAIR | 1977 | 2007 | Operated Douglas DC-3, Fairchild F27, NAMC YS-11 |
| Raslan Air Service | | | MWR | RASLAN | 1996 | 1999 | Operated Saab 340 |
| Services Aériens Internationaux d'Egypte (SAIDE) | | | | | 1947 | 1956 | Operated Fiat G.212 |
| Scorpio Aviation | | 8S | SCP | SCORPIO | 1980 | 2002 | Operated ATR 42 |
| Shorouk Air | | 7Q | SHK | | 1992 | 2003 | |
| Sun Air | | | SUR | | 2006 | 2007 | |
| Transmed Airlines | | MT | TMD | | 1989 | 1996 | Operated Boeing 737-200, Boeing 737-300 |
| Tristar Air | | YS | TSY | TRIPLE STAR | 1998 | 2015 | Operated Airbus A300B4 |
| United Arab Airlines | | MS | MSR | | 1961 | 1971 | Rebranded as EgyptAir |
| ZAS Airline of Egypt | | ZA | ZAS | ZAS AIRLINES | 1981 | 1995 | |

== See also ==
- List of airlines of Egypt
- List of airports in Egypt
