= Air Arabia Abu Dhabi =

Low-cost airline of the United Arab Emirates

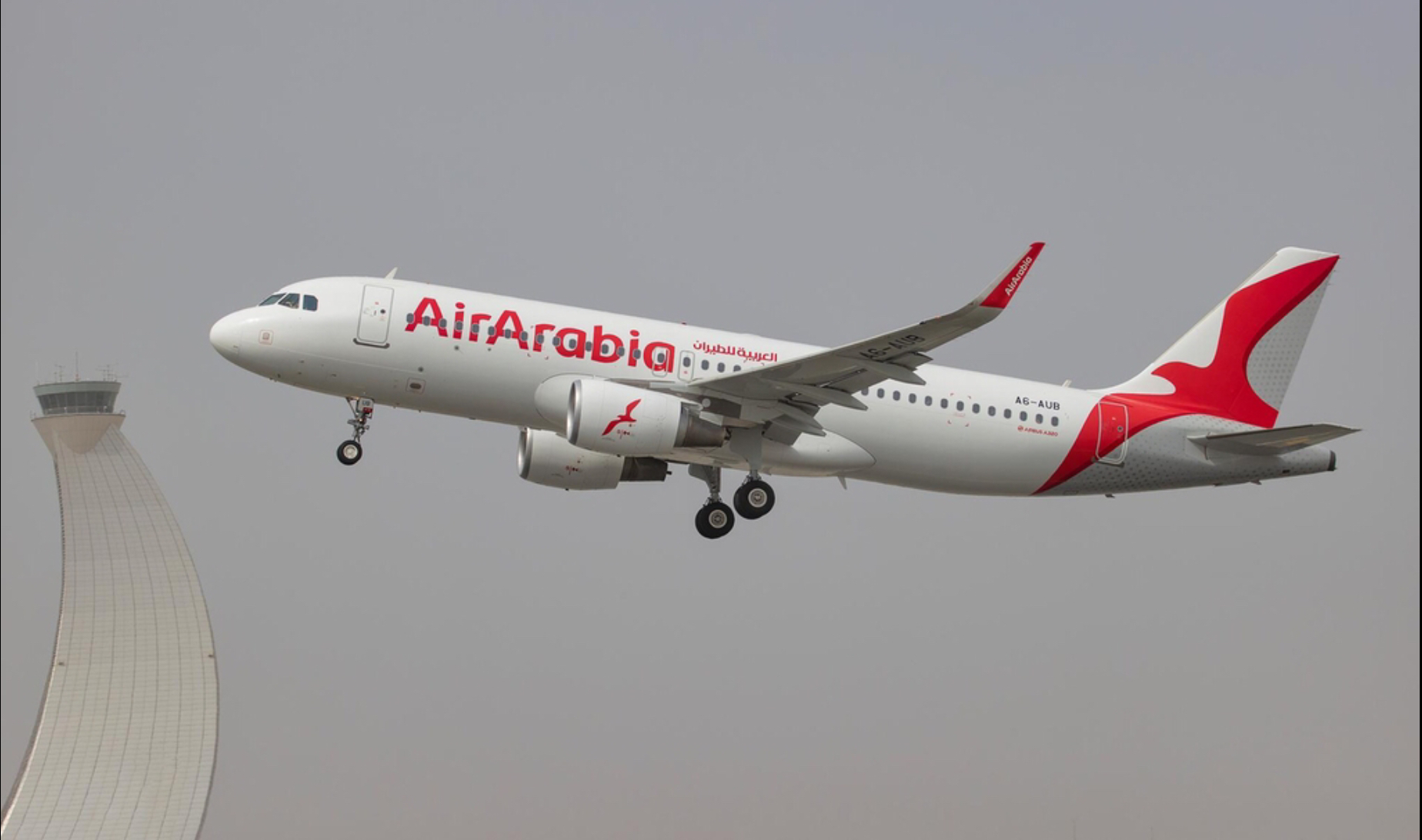
- An Air Arabia Abu Dhabi A320
IATA	ICAO	Call sign
3L	ADY	NAWRAS
- Founded: 16 October 2019; 6 years ago
- Commenced operations: 14 July 2020; 6 years ago
- Operating bases: Zayed International Airport
- Frequent-flyer program: AirRewards
- Alliance: Arab Air Carriers' Organization
- Fleet size: 12
- Destinations: 34
- Parent company: Air Arabia (49%); Etihad Airways (51%)
- Website: www.airarabia.com

Air Arabia Abu Dhabi is an Emirati low-cost airline. It was established in October 2019 through an independent joint-venture agreement between Etihad Aviation Group and Air Arabia to expand into the growing low-cost market, it launched operations in July 2020. The airline is based in Zayed International Airport in Abu Dhabi.

== History ==
In October 2019, Etihad announced it would set up its own low-cost carrier in partnership with Sharjah-based Air Arabia. To that date the airline was the fifth in the UAE, and the first low-cost carrier in Abu Dhabi. The announcement was given during a period in which when Etihad posted a third consecutive year of losses and after pursuing a strategy of investing in failing airlines and after the government owned Etihad began a five year transformation plan in 2017.

Initially, Air Arabia Abu Dhabi was supposed to launch operations in March 2020, with plans to fly to about a dozen destinations in Saudi Arabia, Kazakhstan, Georgia, Armenia, India, Pakistan and Bangladesh.

In April 2020, Air Arabia Abu Dhabi received its air operator certificate from UAE's General Civil Aviation Authority. To that date the airline was yet to commit to a firm launch date due to the travel restrictions during the pandemic.

On July 14, 2020, the airline was launched after the signing of an agreement between Etihad Airways and Air Arabia. The airline started with two based A320-200.

In June 2021, the outbound load factors reached more than 70% while inbound load factors were “much lighter”.

In September 2021, Air Arabia Abu Dhabi expected its annual traffic to grow by 20% to 25% over the upcoming five years.

In October 2022, Air Arabia Abu Dhabi was the second largest carrier in Abu Dhabi with an 8 percent share of seats serving 24 destinations.

== Corporate affairs ==
Air Arabia Abu Dhabi supports the network of destinations and services provided by Etihad Airways, and in turn will meet the needs of the low-cost and growing travel sector in the region. Its board of directors, which is made up of members nominated by the two companies, is responsible for directing the company's independent strategy and developing its business. Air Arabia Abu Dhabi is Etihad Airways’ first major investment, a change from its long-held relationship strategy of airline equity partnerships. Air Arabia Abu Dhabi is expected to take over a number of former and present Etihad routes operated by single-aisle aircraft in the near future.

The airline offers a similar service model to the rest of Air Arabia’s network.

== Competition ==
The ultra low-cost carrier Wizz Air Abu Dhabi also has a base at Zayed International Airport until 1 September 2025. Regarding the short distance between AUH and DXB, the hybrid airline Flydubai is also a competitor.

== Fleet ==
As of August 2025, Air Arabia Abu Dhabi operates the following aircraft:

Air Arabia Abu Dhabi fleet
Aircraft	In service	Orders	Passengers
Airbus A320-200	12	3	174
Total	12	3	

=== Fleet development ===
The airline expects to operate 20 planes by 2025.

== Destinations ==
Countries in which Air Arabia Abu Dhabi operates (March 2026)

The inaugural flight was to Alexandria on 14 July 2020. The second route started one day later to Sohag.

Reported in July 2022, the airline’s CEO Adel Abdulla Ali said “We will put a circle around Abu Dhabi and wherever we find potential within four to six hours, we'd like to do those routes, including Europe”.

In June 2021, the CEO said the CIS, Arab countries, Eastern Europe, and the Indian subcontinent are among the most attractive markets for the airline.

In September 2022, Air Arabia Abu Dhabi announced Moscow as a new destination.

In November 2022, the airline announced flights to the Russian airports of Yekaterinburg and Kazan.
