= Travco Group =

Egyptian travel and tourism company

- Industry: Travel and Tourism
- Founded: 1979
- Headquarters: 6th of October City, 6th of October Governorate, Egypt
- Key people: Hamed El Chiaty (Chairman & CEO)
- Products: Passenger transport, travel agency, accommodation
- Revenue: E£8.8 billion (2008)
- Number of employees: 24,000 (2010)
- Website: www.travcogroup.com

The Travco Group is a travel and tourism company in Egypt. Travco Group provides tourist services, transport, ranging from air travel to cruises as well as accommodation for tourists.

== History ==
Travco Group was founded in Egypt in 1979 by Hamed El Chiaty.

As of 2020, Travco Group owns and manages more than 50 hotels.

== Airline business ==
Travco and Sharjah-based Air Arabia operate Air Arabia Egypt, a joint venture airline based in Egypt. Travco Group owns 50% of the airline with Air Arabia a further 40% and the remaining 10% owned by private Egyptian investors.
