= Hassan Allam Holding =

Egyptian engineering and construction company

Hassan Allam Holding is an Egyptian engineering, construction, infrastructure, and investment company. Established in 1936, the company has evolved from a local civil works contractor into a diversified multinational group operating across engineering, procurement, construction (EPC), infrastructure investment, renewable energy, water, transportation, logistics, and social infrastructure. The group is headquartered in Cairo and operates in more than 10 countries across the Middle East and Africa through a network of specialized subsidiaries. It employs more than 50,000 people and manages a diverse portfolio of public and private sector projects spanning from solar power and water to petrochemicals facilities, museums, airports, and thousands of kilometers of roads and bridges across the region.

On the engineering and construction front, the Group is ranked as one of the Top 250 Global Contractors and ranked in the Top 225 International Design Firms. The Group offers engineering and turnkey contractor solutions for the full scope of EPC services in power, petrochemical, oil & gas, water, and wastewater treatment plants and transmission lines, roads & bridges, industrial plants, malls, hotels, stadiums and sports facilities and mixed-use developments.

On the investment and development front, Hassan Allam Utilities is the investment and development arm for the Group operating across four key verticals focused on sustainable infrastructure to address service and availability gaps in water, energy, social infrastructure, and transport and logistics across Egypt and MEA.

== See also ==
- List of companies of Egypt
