= Stella (beer) =

Egyptian lager beer

- Type: Beer
- Manufacturer: Al Ahram Beverages Company
- Origin: Egypt, Alexandria and Cairo
- Introduced: 1897; 129 years ago
- Alcohol by volume: 4.5%
- Style: Lager
- Ingredients: Hops, malted barley, water, and yeast
- Website: www.alahrambeverages.com/brands/stella/

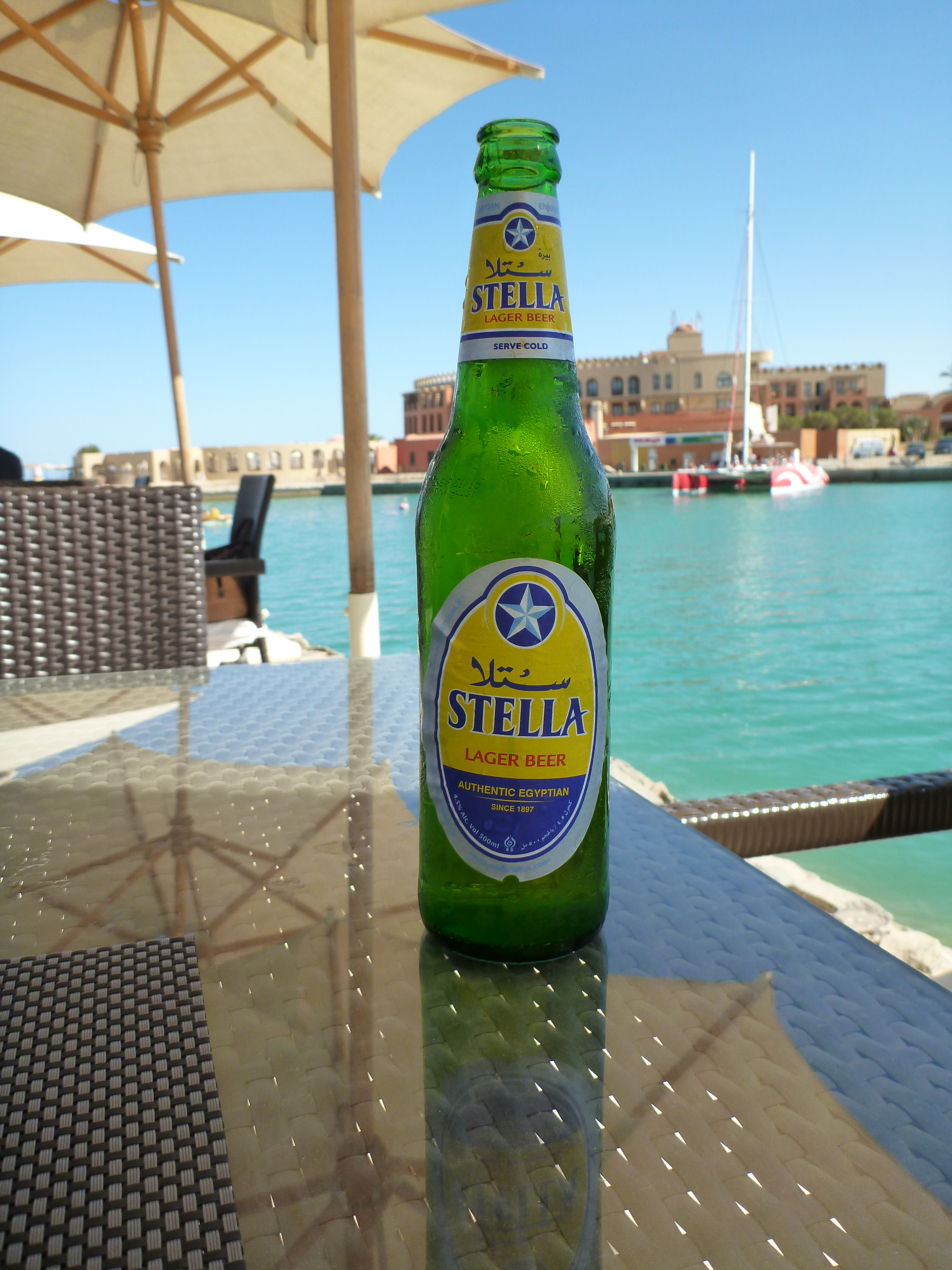
A bottle of Stella beer

Stella (Arabic: ستلا) is an Egyptian beer brand established in 1897. Founded by Belgian entrepreneurs as the Crown Brewery Company in Alexandria, Stella quickly became synonymous with beer culture in Egypt, reflecting the nation's historical and cultural transformations.

== History ==
Initially, Stella production was centered in Alexandria under the Crown Brewery Company in 1897, followed by the Pyramid Brewery founded in Cairo in 1898. Both breweries produced and sold a beer named Stella, each based on completely different recipes. In 1921, they both merged to produce Stella under a unified recipe. The merger arose from strategic necessity, ending direct competition and creating the largest brewing operation in Africa at the time. Stella was launched during the culturally vibrant 1920s in Cairo, a period known for nightlife comparable to global cities such as Berlin and New York.

Throughout the early to mid-20th century, Stella maintained a strong market position, bolstered by high demand from tourists, locals, foreign residents, and British soldiers who were present in Egypt until 1956. Recognizing this success, Heineken invested in Crown and Pyramid Breweries in 1937 with the dual aim of expanding the local beer market and using Egypt as a strategic base for further expansion into the Middle East and Africa. This strategy initially succeeded, and within two decades Heineken acquired or invested in breweries across Jordan, Lebanon, Syria, Morocco, Sudan, and the Congo.

During the 1950s, Crown and Pyramid Breweries faced accusations of employing anti-competitive practices. Nile Brewery, a competitor founded at the time, alleged that Crown and Pyramid used illegal means to suppress competition; however, these allegations remained unverified. Regardless of their validity, Nile Brewery ultimately went bankrupt, allowing Crown and Pyramid to solidify their dominance.

In 1963, Heineken's operations in Egypt experienced a significant setback when President Gamal Abdel Nasser nationalized Crown and Pyramid Breweries, consolidating them into a single state-owned entity known as Al Ahram Beverages Company. Consequently, Heineken was compelled to relinquish its shares, marking a substantial shift in the Egyptian beer market.

In 1997, the company was privatized, leading to improved quality standards, and was acquired once again by Heineken International in 2003.

== Production ==
Al Ahram Beverage Company is based in Obour, where it produces a variety of local and international brands of beer, including Stella. Stella is brewed primarily using water, malted barley, hops, and yeast.

== Cultural significance ==
Beer in general, but especially Stella, held a prominent place within Egypt's drinking culture of the 1920s and 1930s, a period of widespread social acceptance of alcoholic beverages. According to historians, Stella beer had become "an inseparable part of Egyptian culture", with the Al Ahram Beverages Company, its producer, holding a near-monopoly in the Egyptian beer market.

== Recognition ==
In 2011, Stella beer received the Gold Medal for Quality from Monde Selection, an international award recognizing excellence in brewing standards.

== See also ==
- Beer in Egypt
