= Fly Arna =

Armenian low-cost airline (2021–2024)

Armenian National Airlines
IATA	ICAO	Call sign
G6	ACY	ARNA
- Founded: July 2021
- Ceased operations: January 2024
- AOC #: 075
- Operating bases: Zvartnots International Airport
- Frequent-flyer program: AirRewards
- Fleet size: 3
- Destinations: 5
- Parent company: Air Arabia
- Headquarters: Yerevan, Armenia
- Key people: Antony Price (CEO)
- Website: flyarna.com

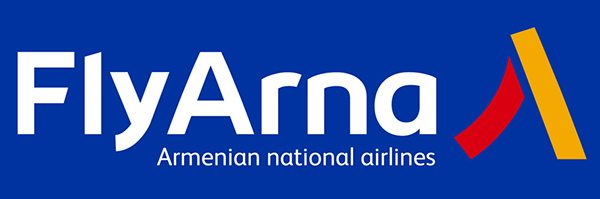

Armenian National Airlines CJSC (Armenian: «Հայկական ազգային ավիաուղիներ» ՓԲԸ), styled as Fly Arna (Armenian: Ֆլայ Արնա), was an Armenian low-cost airline based in Yerevan, Armenia. It was a joint-venture between Air Arabia low-cost carrier and the Armenian government-owned Armenia National Interests Fund (ANIF). From 2022 to 2024 it was the flag carrier of Armenia.

The airline ceased operations in January 2024. In March Armenian Prime Minister Nikol Pashinyan announced that FlyArna had failed and announced plans to liquidate the airline. In May the Armenian government approved the dissolution of the Armenian National Interest Fund (ANIF) and the airline began liquidation proceedings.

== History ==
=== Foundation ===
The airline was founded after a joint-venture agreement signed in July 2021 between the recently established Armenia National Interests Fund (ANIF) and United Arab Emirates carrier Air Arabia. 51% of the airline's shares were owned by ANIF and the remaining 49% by Air Arabia.

In May 2022, the airline received its Air Operator's Certificate and added its first aircraft. The airline selected the Airbus A320 aircraft to build its fleet, in order to maintain commonality with partner Air Arabia.

FlyArna commenced operations with flights to Hurghada on July 3, 2022, and to Sharm El Sheikh on July 4, 2022. The airline announced plans to commence flights to Kuwait and Beirut as the next destinations, continuing with its plans to better connect Armenia with the Middle East.

In January 2023, the airline announced that it would start flights to the Sheremetyevo International Airport in Moscow and to the Pulkovo Airport in Saint Petersburg. The company also announced intentions to operate flights to India - Yerevan to Delhi and Mumbai - as well as flights to Sharjah in United Arab Emirates.

=== Suspension ===
In January 2024, the company suspended all flights and announced that they were undergoing operational revisions and would resume flights in due course. The company's license was suspended in the following month of March. Thereafter the company was required to obtain adequate aircraft within six months in order for the suspension to be lifted.

=== Dissolution ===
In March 2024, Armenian Prime Minister Nikol Pashinyan announced that FlyArna had failed and that there was no other solution than to liquidate the airline. In May the Armenian government approved the dissolution of the Armenian National Interest Fund (ANIF) and the airline began liquidation proceedings. Both Airbus A320-200s were returned to the 49% shareholder, Air Arabia.

== Destinations ==
Fly Arna operated scheduled flights to the following destinations:

Country	City	Airport	Notes	Refs
Armenia	Yerevan	Zvartnots International Airport	Hub	
Egypt	Sharm El Sheikh	Sharm El Sheikh International Airport		
Georgia	Tbilisi	Tbilisi International Airport		
Iran	Tehran	Imam Khomeini International Airport		
Iraq	Baghdad	Baghdad International Airport		
Kuwait	Kuwait City	Kuwait International Airport		
Russia	Moscow	Moscow Domodedovo Airport		
Russia	Moscow	Vnukovo International Airport		
Russia	Sochi	Sochi International Airport		
Russia	Saint Petersburg	Pulkovo Airport		

== Fleet ==
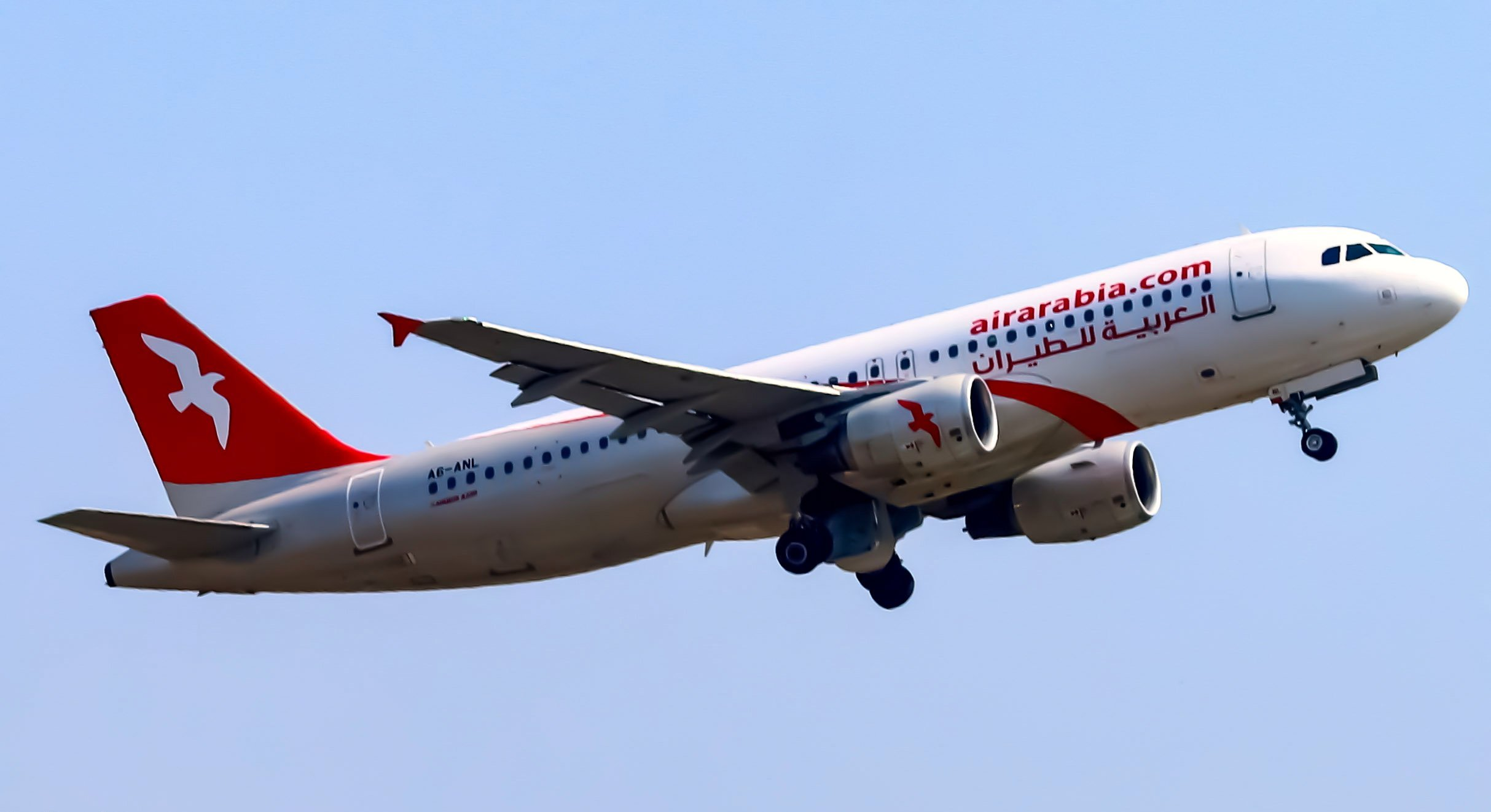
Air Arabia Airbus A320-200s had close ties with those of Fly Arna

Fly Arna fleet consisted of the following aircraft:

Aircraft	In service	Orders	Passengers			Notes
Aircraft	In service	Orders	C	Y	Total	Notes
Airbus A320-200	3	—	—	174	174	
Total	3	—				

== See also ==
- List of airlines of Armenia
- List of airports in Armenia
- List of the busiest airports in Armenia
- Transport in Armenia
