= Air Arabia =

Low-cost airline in the United Arab Emirates

- Air Arabia Airbus A321neo
IATA	ICAO	Call sign
G9	ABY	ARABIA
- Founded: 3 February 2003; 23 years ago
- Commenced operations: 28 October 2003; 23 years ago
- Operating bases: Abu Dhabi; Ras Al Khaimah; Sharjah
- Frequent-flyer program: AirRewards
- Subsidiaries: Air Arabia Abu Dhabi; Air Arabia Egypt; Air Arabia Maroc; Fly Jinnah
- Fleet size: 85
- Destinations: 81 (excluding subsidiaries)
- Parent company: Air Arabia PJSC
- Traded as: DFM: AIRARABIA
- Headquarters: Sharjah International Airport, Sharjah, United Arab Emirates
- Key people: Abdullah bin Mohammed Al Thani (chairman); Adel Ali (group CEO)
- Revenue: ▲AED 7.8 billion (FY 2025)
- Profit: ▲AED 1.6 billion (FY 2025)
- Total assets: ▲AED 17.7 billion (FY 2025)
- Total equity: ▲AED 8.4 billion (FY 2025)
- Employees: 1,353 (Dec 2020)
- Website: www.airarabia.com/en

Air Arabia (Arabic: العربية للطيران al-ʿArabiyya Lit-Ṭayarāan) is an Emirati low-cost airline based in Sharjah, United Arab Emirates. The airline operates scheduled services to 200 destinations in the Middle East, North Africa, the Indian subcontinent, Central Asia, and Europe to 22 countries from Sharjah, 28 destinations in nine countries from Casablanca, Fez, Nador, and Tangier, 11 destinations in eight countries from Ras Al Khaimah, and six destinations in four countries from Alexandria. Air Arabia's main base is Sharjah International Airport. There are also operating bases in Ras Al Khaimah and Abu Dhabi as well as in Alexandria and Casablanca.

== History ==
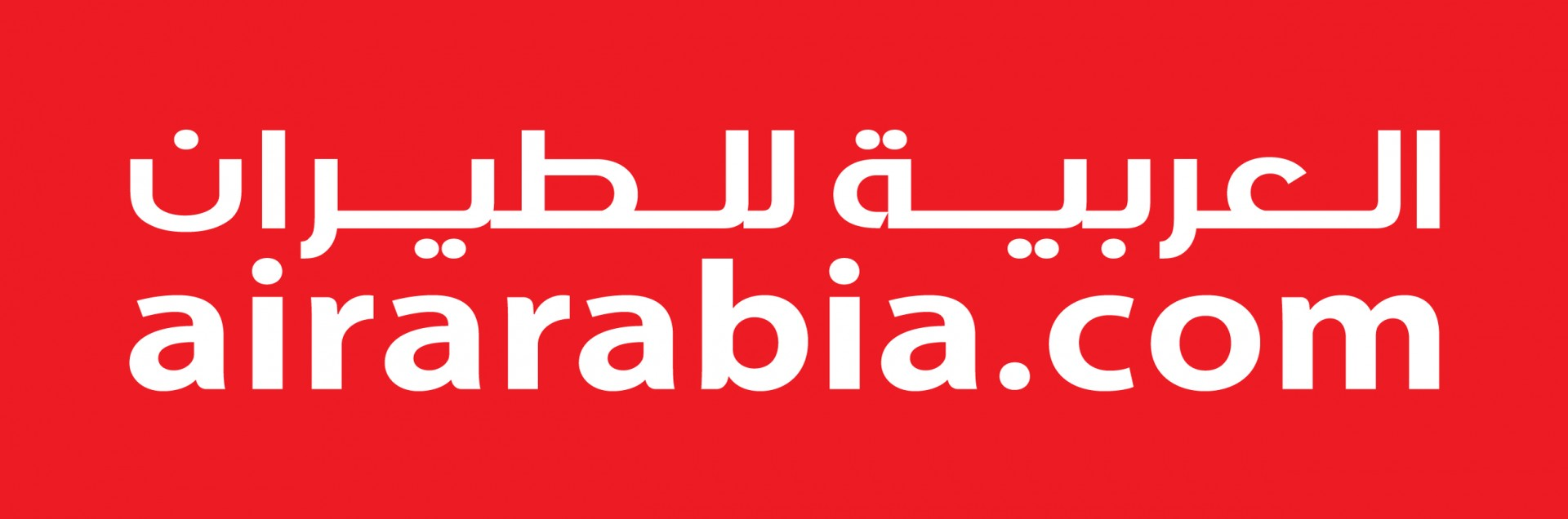
Air Arabia's former logo used until 2018

Air Arabia (العربية للطيران) was established on 3 February 2003 by an Amiri decree issued by Sultan bin Muhammad Al-Qasimi, the ruler of Sharjah and member of the Supreme Council of the United Arab Emirates, becoming the first low-fare airline in the Middle East.

The airline started operations on 28 October 2003. It broke even during its first year in business, and launched an initial public offering for 55% of its stock early in 2007.

In March 2014, Airbus delivered its 6,000th A320 family aircraft to Air Arabia.

== Corporate affairs ==
=== Management and ownership ===
Air Arabia launched in October 2003 and was the second low-cost carrier in the Middle East. The company reported more than AED 19 billion in Q4 2019. The airline broke even in its first year of operation. Air Arabia consists of a group of airlines and companies offering travel and tourism services across the Middle East and North Africa.

=== Headquarters ===
The headquarters is in the Sharjah airport Freight Center, on the property of Sharjah International Airport. The airport is 15 kilometres (9.3 mi) away from central Dubai.

=== Subsidiaries ===
==== Abu Dhabi ====
Air Arabia Abu Dhabi (2020–present). The airline was launched on 14 July 2020 after the signing of an agreement between Etihad Aviation Group and Air Arabia. Air Arabia Abu Dhabi will support the network of destinations and services provided by Etihad Airways, and in turn will meet the needs of the low-cost and growing travel sector in the region.

==== Armenia ====
Fly Arna (2021–2024). In September 2021, Air Arabia announced a joint venture with the Armenian National Interests Fund (ANIF) to launch a new national airline called Fly Arna. Fly Arna operated as a low-cost passenger airline with Yerevan’s Zvartnots International Airport (EVN) as its base. It ceased operations in 2024.

==== Egypt ====
Air Arabia Egypt (2010–present). On 9 September 2009, Air Arabia announced Air Arabia Egypt as a joint venture with Egyptian travel and tourism company Travco Group to be based in Alexandria, Egypt.

==== Jordan ====
Air Arabia Jordan (2015–2018). In January 2015, Air Arabia announced the acquisition of a 49% stake in Petra Airlines. The principal shareholder of Petra Airlines, the RUM Group, retains a 51% stake in the airline, which will be rebranded as Air Arabia Jordan in early 2015. The first flights of the new airline took place during the week commencing 18 May 2015, with launch destinations being Kuwait, Sharm El Sheikh, Erbil, and Jeddah. Air Arabia Jordan ended operations in 2018.

==== Morocco ====
Air Arabia Maroc (2009–present). Air Arabia, in a joint venture with Moroccan investors, established Air Arabia Maroc and set up a secondary base in Morocco's largest city, Casablanca. It began operations in May 2009, allowing Air Arabia to expand into Europe and Africa.

==== Nepal ====
Fly Yeti (2007–2008). In 2007, Air Arabia opened a base in Nepal's capital Kathmandu to serve Asia and the Middle East, after signing a joint venture agreement with Yeti Airlines. It established a low-cost carrier, Fly Yeti that provided service to international destinations.

==== Pakistan ====
Fly Jinnah (2021–present). In September 2021, Air Arabia announced a joint venture with Pakistani conglomerate Lakson Group to launch a low cost airline called Fly Jinnah. This will be a budget carrier serving domestic and international routes from Pakistan.

=== Saudi Arabia ===
Air Arabia Saudi Arabia (2026-present). The airline began operations on 2 October 2026 and is a consortium led by Air Arabia as well as Kun Investment Holding and Nesma Holding based Dammam.

=== Service concept ===
Air Arabia does not provide free catering, but passengers can purchase catering onboard or in advance. The airline does not, however, serve alcoholic beverages on its flights.

=== Business trends ===
The key trends for Air Arabia over recent years are shown below (as at year ending 31 December):

Key indicators
	Turnover (AED M)	Net profit (AED M)	Number of employees	Number of passengers (M) Mainline (all hubs)	Passenger load factor (%)	Number of destinations	Number of aircraft (at year end)	Notes
2004	181	N/A		0.5	68	15	3	
2005	411	31		1.1	79	23	5	
2006	749	101		1.8	80	32	8	
2007	1,283	369		2.7	86	37	11	
2008	2,066	510		3.6	85	44	16	
2009	1,972	452		4.1	80	45	21	
2010	2,08	310		4.5	83	65	25	
2011	1,796	195		4.7	82	69	29	
2012	2,832	424		5.3	82	82	33	
2013	3,183	435		6.1	80		34	
2014	3,729	566		6.8	81	90	39	
2015	3,825	530		7.6	79		41	
2016	3,778	481		8.0	82		46	
2017	3,739	365	1,900	8.5	79		50	
2018	4,122	−579	2,000	8.7	81		53	
2019	4,758	1,008	2,100	9.4	83		55	
2020	1,851	−192	1,353	2.9	79		57	
2021	3,174	720	1,498	4.4	73		58	
2022	5,241	1,222	2,058	8.3 (12.8)	80		68	
2023	5,999	1,548		10.1 (16.7)	80		73	
2024	6,639	1,477		11.2 (18.8)	82		81	
2025	7,788	1,629		13.1 (21.8)	85	219	90	

In June 2019, Air Arabia disclosed that it had an exposure of $336 million to Abraaj through funds and short-term loans. It had sued Abraaj founder Arif Naqvi in Sharjah Courts. The airline took a AED 1.1 billion hit on their books in 2018 due to their exposure to Abraaj.

As the pandemic hit airline services, Air Arabia reported a net loss of AED192 million ($56.2 million) in 2020. Also, the turnover for Q4 of 2020 was 53% below Q4 of 2019. The airline’s net profits in Q1 of 2021 fell by 52% to AED 33.844 million. Also, revenue generated in Q1 of 2021 was AED 572.145 after witnessing major drop from AED 901.374 million in Q1 of 2020.

== Destinations ==
As of July 2021, Air Arabia serves up to 120 airports across the Middle East, North Africa, Asia and Europe. On 11 December 2024, Air Arabia announced on its website the resumption of direct flights between Sharjah and Beirut, Lebanon beginning 18 December 2024.

== Fleet ==
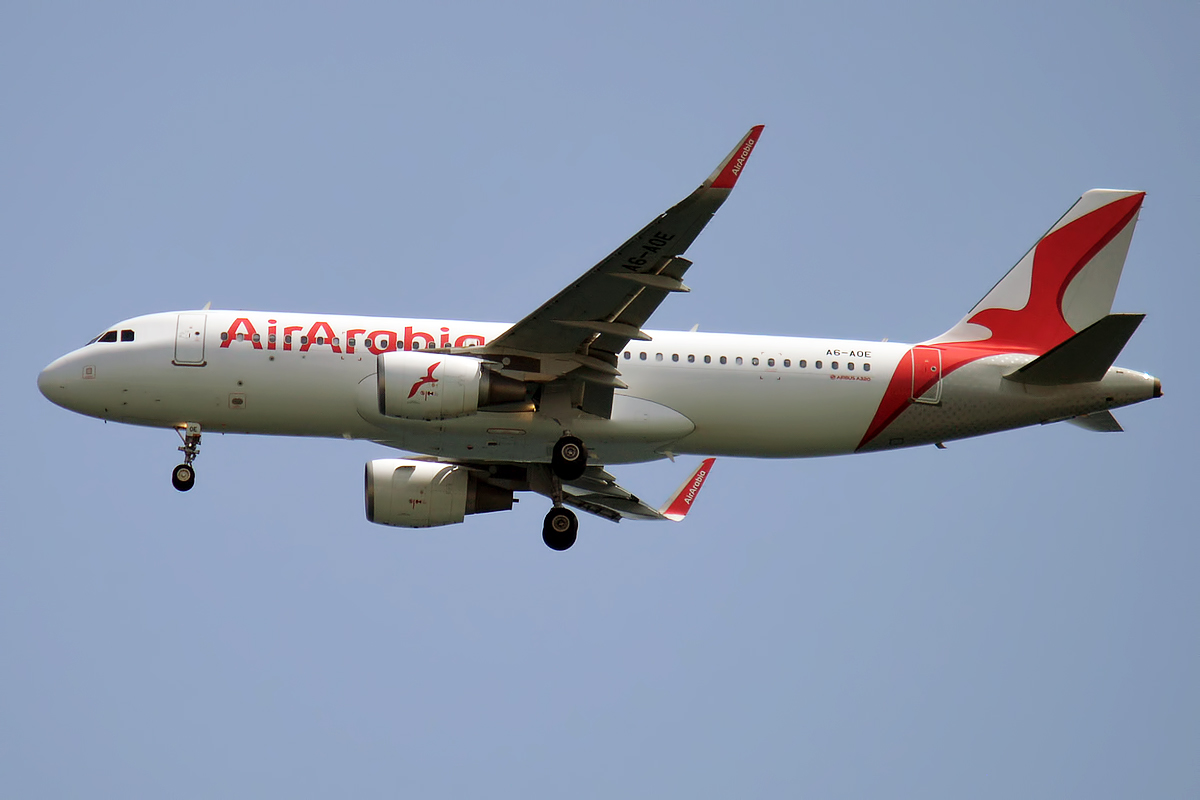
Air Arabia Airbus A320-200

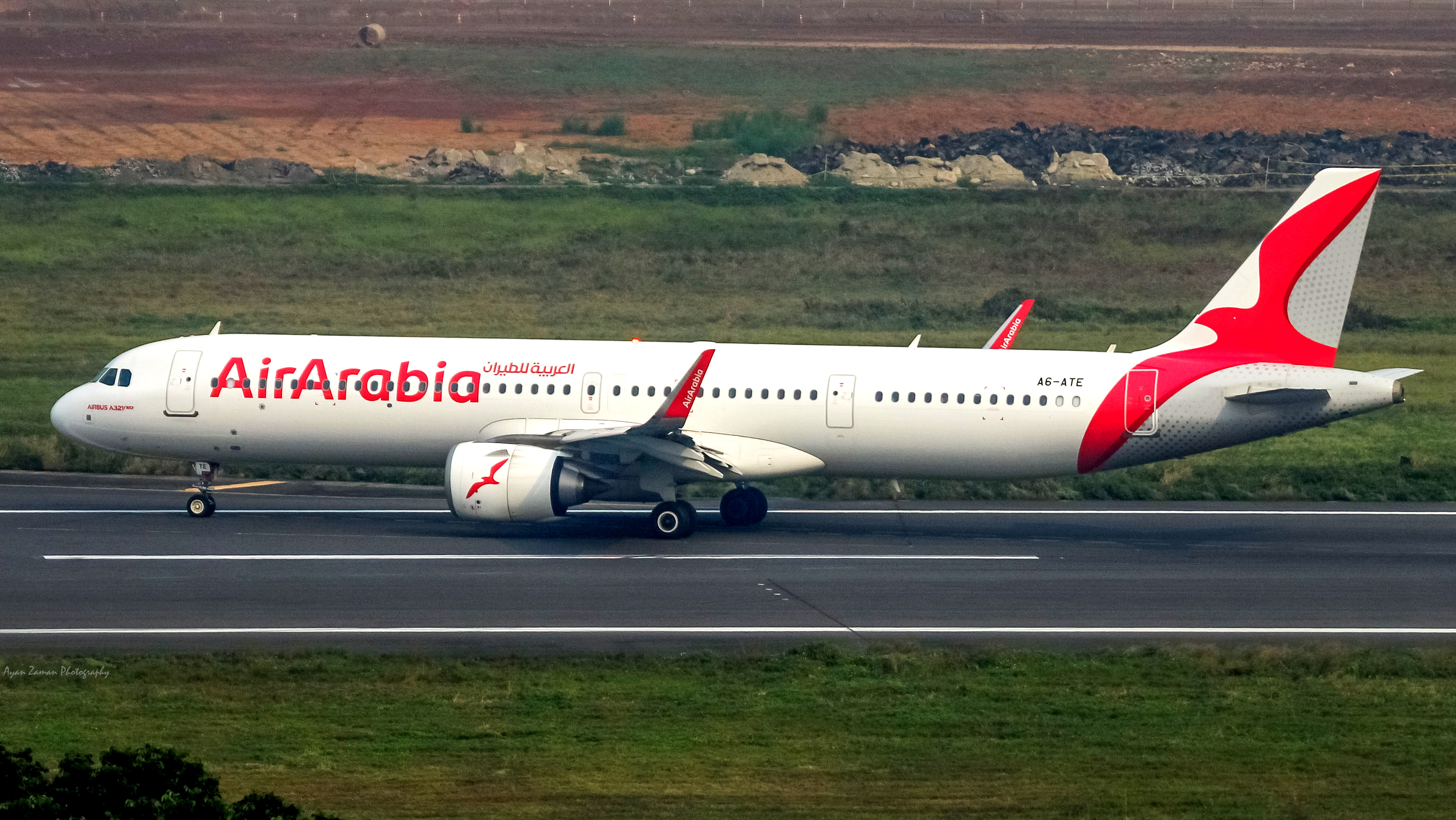
Air Arabia Airbus A321LR

As of March 2025, Air Arabia and its co-branded subsidiaries operate an all-Airbus A320 family fleet composed of the following aircraft:

Air Arabia Group fleet
Aircraft	In service	Orders	Operator	Passengers	Notes
Airbus A320-200	43	—	Air Arabia	168	
Airbus A320-200	43	—	Air Arabia	174	
Airbus A320-200	11	—	Air Arabia Maroc	174	
Airbus A320-200	12	—	Air Arabia Abu Dhabi	168	
Airbus A320-200	12	—	Air Arabia Abu Dhabi	174	
Airbus A320-200	4	—	Air Arabia Egypt	174	
Airbus A320-200	10	—	Fly Jinnah	180	
Airbus A320neo	7	71		TBA	
Airbus A321-200	3	—	Air Arabia	TBA	
Airbus A321neo	6	21		TBA	
Airbus A321LR	6	—	Air Arabia	215	
Airbus A321XLR	—	20		TBA	Deliveries from 2027.
Total	103	112			

=== Fleet development ===
In November 2017, the airline signed a lease agreement for six A321LR. In April 2019, Air Arabia received its first A321LR. In November 2019, during the Dubai Air Show, the airline announced its order of 120 aircraft comprising 73 A320neo, 27 A321neo and 20 A321XLR, with deliveries from 2024.

=== Livery ===
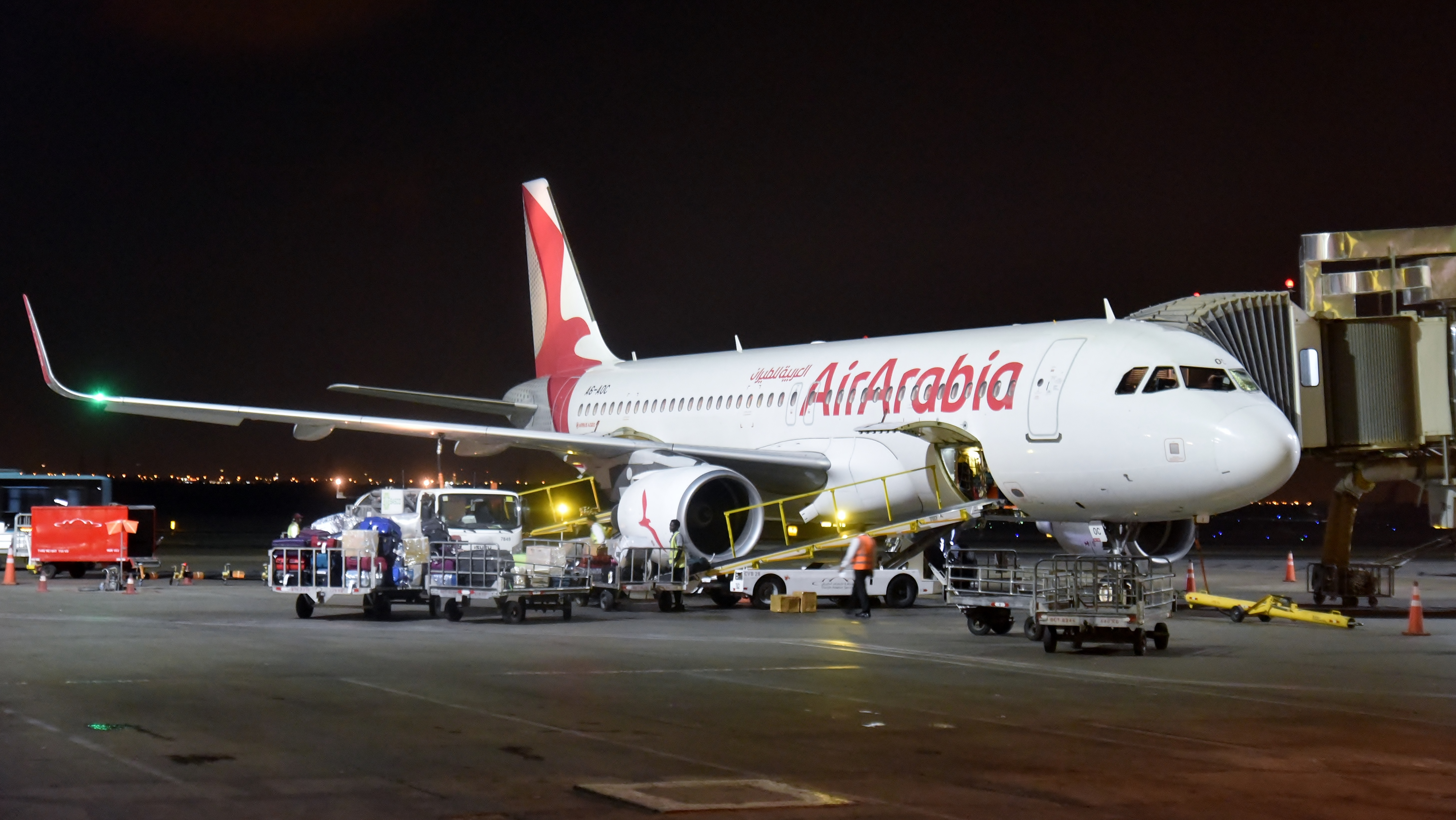
Air Arabia Airbus A320-200 in current livery at Sharjah International Airport in 2025

Air Arabia has a livery with the aircraft body being painted in three different colors, red, grey, and white. The tail and each aircraft engine bear the company logo of Sharjah in the form of a bird. Celebrating 15 years of service in October 2018, a new livery was introduced and was applied to the whole fleet.

The updated livery features a large red bird logo coming down from tail to rear fuselage with grey accents behind its wings and billboard-style AirArabia title in English on the front of aircraft with small Arabic title placed next to it above the windows. The bird logo also adorns the engines while the title is applied on red winglets.

== See also ==
- List of airlines of the United Arab Emirates
