= Beer in Egypt =

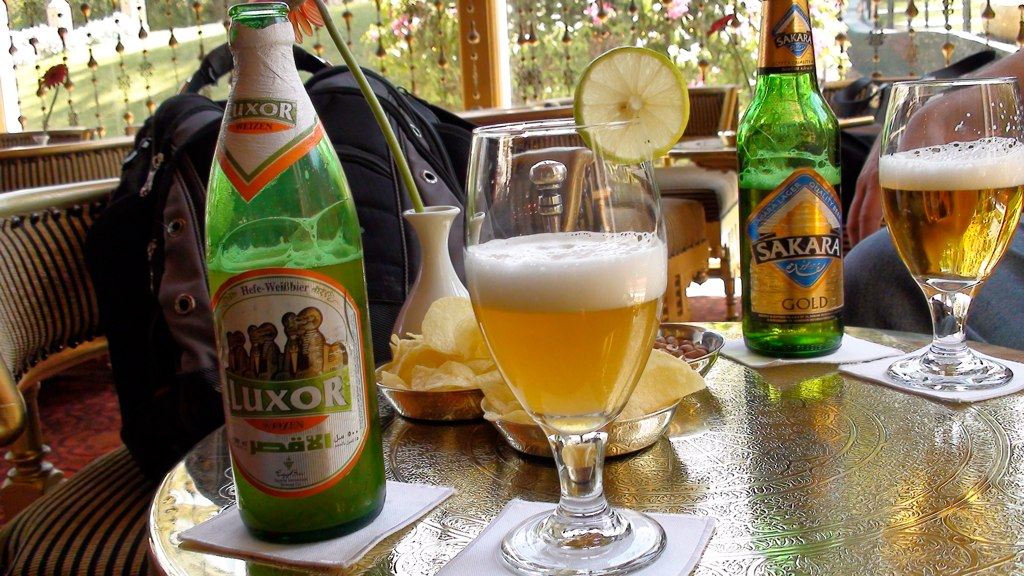
A bottle of Luxor Weizen, a wheat beer from the Luxor brand brewed by Egybev, and a bottle of Sakara Gold

Beer in Egypt has long held a significant role, and its presence in the country is thought to date back to the Predynastic period. In ancient Egypt wine was preferred by the upper class, whereas beer was a staple for working class Egyptians and a central part of their diet.

== History ==
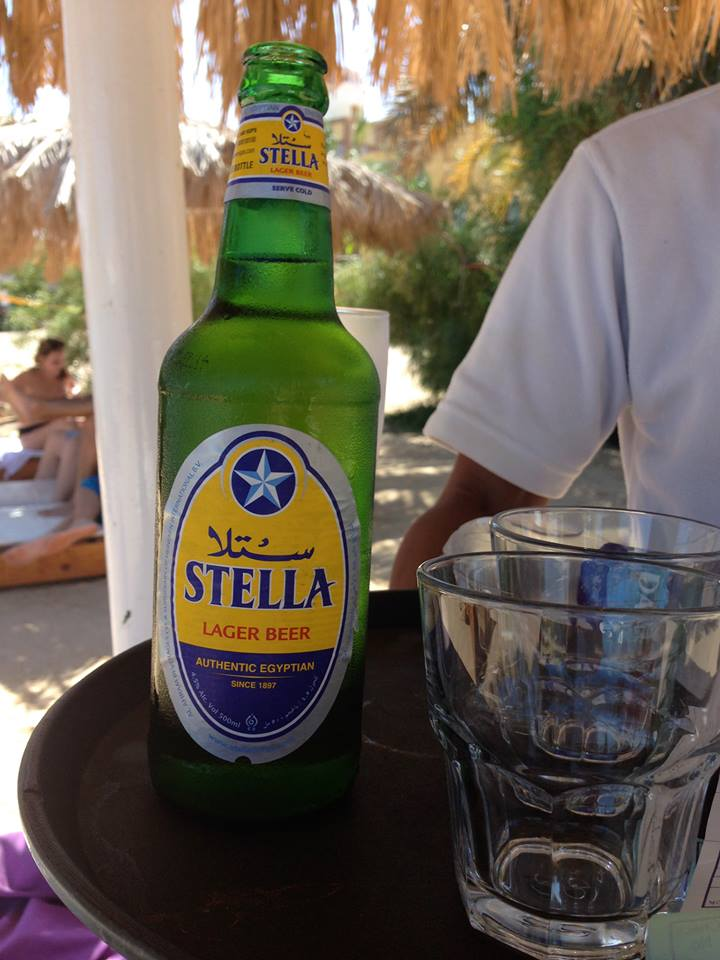
Stella, a lager brewed by Al Ahram Beverages Company

The modern beer industry in Egypt was founded by Belgian businessmen in 1897, with the establishment of Crown Brewery in Alexandria and later the Pyramid Brewery in Giza. Both breweries produced and sold a beer named Stella, each based on completely different recipes. In 1937 Heineken International became a major shareholder in both breweries. This acquisition coincided with growing nationalist sentiment and a political drive for increased native involvement in businesses, or Egyptianization. Under Heineken's ownership Pyramid Brewery took on the Arabized name Al Ahram Brewery. In 1963 the companies were consolidated under the name Al Ahram Beverages Company (ABC), after being nationalized by the socialist government of Egyptian president Gamal Abdel Nasser. The Stella brand was unified under government ownership and continued to be mass-produced. In 1997 the government sold the company to Egyptian businessman Ahmad Zayat who restructured it and introduced a line of non-alcoholic beverages to the company's portfolio. It was acquired once again by Heineken International in 2002. Stella remains by far the most popular beer in Egypt, with 47.5 million liters sold in 2016 (equivalent to a third of Egypt's total beer consumption), and ABC, which markets Stella as well as non-alcoholic Birell (the second most popular beer in Egypt), controls 89 percent of Egypt's beer market.

Today Al Ahram is based in Obour City produces a variety of local and international brands of beer, including Heineken, Desperados and the iconic Stella. In 2012 the company made $300 million in profit from beer sales alone. It is one of two major breweries in the country, the other being the Egyptian International Beverage Company (known as Egybev) owned by Egyptian businessman Samih Sawiris.

Non-alcoholic beers, like the aforementioned Birell and fruit-flavored Fayrouz, are very popular in Egypt, as observant Muslims tend to avoid the consumption of alcohol due to religious restrictions. Flavored alcoholic beers have also become trendy since the successful launch of tequila-flavored Desperados in 2016. ABC followed up with the launch of several fruit-flavored versions of their high-strength Meister Max brand, later in 2016, and other companies have since followed suit. These flavored beers are particularly popular with younger Egyptians.

In February 2021, archaeologists confirmed the discovery of a beer factory at Abydos that dates back to the time of King Narmer, who reigned during the First Dynastic Period (3150BC–2613BC).

== Local varieties ==
A beer type known as bouza (Egyptian Arabic: بوظة), based on barley and bread, has been consumed in Egypt since beer first made its appearance in the country, possibly as early as the Predynastic era. Despite sharing names with boza, a nonalcoholic beverage consumed in Turkey and the Balkans, it is not the same beverage. Bouza, and beer in general, was referred to as mizr in Egypt, and also keshkab, during the Middle Ages. The latter specifically refers to bouza that used mint, lemon leaves, nigella, pepper or rue as gruit, historically consumed in the coastal provinces of Egypt. The beverage is traditionally homebrewed, following a 5,000 year-old method of preparation that closely resembles depictions of beer-brewing on ancient Egyptian murals. The alcohol content of bouza can reach up to 7%, depending on how long it is left to ferment. It is often associated with the working class and is seen as an inexpensive alternative to commercial beer.

== See also ==
- Stella (beer)
- Egyptian wine
- Egyptian cuisine
