= List of airlines of Egypt =

This is a list of airlines currently operating in Egypt.

== Airlines of Egypt ==
Airline	ICAO	IATA	Callsign	Image	Commenced operations
Air Arabia Egypt	RBG	E5	ARABIA EGYPT		2009
Air Cairo	MSC	SM	AIR CAIRO		2003
Alexandria Airlines	KHH	DQ			2007
AlMasria Universal Airlines	LMU	UJ	ALMASRIA		2008
AMC Airlines	AMV	9V	AMV		1992
Egyptair	MSR	MS	EGYPTAIR		1932
Nesma Airlines	NMA	NE	NESMA		2010
Nile Air	NIA	NP	NILEBIRD		2008
Petroleum Air Services	PER	UF	PAS AIR		1982
Red Sea Airlines (charter airline)	RSX	4S	RED SEA		2024
Smart Aviation Company	SME				2007

== See also ==
- List of all airlines
- List of defunct airlines of Egypt
- List of airports in Egypt
