= Egyptian International Beverage Company =

The Egyptian International Beverage Company (EIBCO) is an Egyptian brewery founded in October 2005. EIBCO products that include the Luxor brand are in part distributed by Cheers, a beverage shop and delivery service. EIBCO is the 2nd major brewery in Egypt after Al-Ahram Beverage Company.

== See also ==
- Egyptian wine
- Beer in Egypt
