= Jet Link Holland =

Netherlands cargo airline

- Founded: 1991
- Commenced operations: 1998
- Ceased operations: 2000
- Subsidiaries: Tristar Air
- Headquarters: Amsterdam

Jet Link Holland was a cargo airline based in Amsterdam, Netherlands. Its main base was Amsterdam Schiphol Airport.

== History ==
The airline was founded in 1991, but due to the Gulf War, the start of operations was delayed until June 1998. Once the airline started operations, it acquired Airbus A300 aircraft due to their availability and their cargo capability (the airline initially planned to acquire Boeing 757s but finally decided on the A300) to cover their flights to China, the United States and Japan. In August 1998, Jet Link Holland planned to operate flights between Amsterdam, Cairo and Tripoli, but needed coverage, and for this duty created their Egyptian subsidiary Tristar Air in September, which was fitted with one A300 to link Cairo with Amsterdam and Tripoli. In March 2000, Dutch civil aviation authorities found several failures in Jet Link's aircraft overhaul and thus suspended their air operator's certificate (AOC); the airline was declared in bankruptcy in June. The Egyptian subsidiary operated flights between Cairo, Tripoli, and Amsterdam until it too ceased operations in 2015.

== Fleet ==
- Two Airbus A300B4-200F
