= TA Telecom =

African mobile technology company

- Founded: 2000
- Headquarters: Egypt; Nigeria; Kenya; Libya; UAE; Saudi Arabia; Afghanistan; Rwanda; Morocco

TA telecom is an African mobile technology and software company that builds mobile content platforms, analytic tools and brands products.

== History ==
The startup was founded in 2000 by Egyptian techpreneur Amr Shady. TA telecom expanded from its headquarters in Egypt to Nigeria, South Africa, Kenya, Libya, UAE, Saudi Arabia, Afghanistan, Rwanda, and Morocco. It started as a mobile advertising provider and provided value-added services (VAS) a year later in 2001. Value-added services are phone services that users can receive in addition to their core voice calls (e.g., ring back tones, daily news summaries that are automatically sent to users by SMS, etc.). The company moved into developing mobile applications and predictive analytics in 2012. TA telecom grew between 2006 and 2013. It began with a small client base in Egypt, but its products now reach around 10 million users in the Middle East and Africa (MENA). The company's employees increased from 15 in 2006 to 65 in 2015. Its revenue also grew by 560% from 2009 to 2014.

=== Timeline ===
- 2000: Company founded in Egypt as a mobile advertising agency
- 2001: Produced first VAS application, a game for soccer fans in Cairo with Vodafone Egypt as the main client.
- 2004: Began producing and aggregating content for telecom companies. Main clients: Vodafone, Mobinil, and Etisalat.
- 2006: Launched BUZZ!, a VAS platform
- 2005 - 2014: Entered markets in the UAE, Nigeria, Afghanistan, Kenya, Morocco, Nigeria, Libya, Rwanda, Tanzania
- 2014: Invented PI, a data analytic tool that measures the performance of subscription-based services and predicts growth
- 2014: Launched Reveel in Silicon Valley

== TA telecom's Mobile Technology and Software ==
- Pi or Performance Index is a predictive analytics tool which measures the performance of mobile subscription-based services, identifying trends and changes in product performances to provide insights for business on growing revenues. The PI analytic tool is the foundation of Reveel's technology – a company TA telecom spun-off in the U.S. Silicon Valley in 2014.
- BUZZ! is a content-delivery platform providing SMS content to subscribers such as real-time goal alerts; breaking news; daily health, wellbeing and life coaching tips; weather updates; religion; and financial services.
- Waseelah is an Islamic content subscription services unit which provides spiritual content such as Daily Duaa, Daily Hadith, historical information and prayers.
- Nafsi is a psychometric test designed to identify personality types, send customized daily life coaching tips to subscribers, and provide marketers with data driven insights on personality breakdown in the African market.

== Tech CSR ==
MegaKheir Foundation is the charity arm of TA telecom. It is a mobile donation platform whereby users send text messages via their mobile phones to donate EGP 5 per SMS. According to Diginomica, the platform raised USD 1.67M in the Muslim holy month of Ramadan 2014, for several charitable organizations that work on fighting cancer, hunger, poverty, heart disease and many other causes. The 57357 Children Cancer Hospital and the Magdi Yacoub Heart Foundation, which offer free health care in their respective fields, are two organizations who raise funds through MegaKheir.
