= Cook Door =

Egyptian fast food restaurant chain

- Type: Restaurant
- Industry: Fast food
- Founded: 1988; 38 years ago
- Headquarters: Egypt
- Area served: Egypt and other Arab World
- Products: Sandwiches (meat, chicken and sea food), meals and pizzas
- Owner: The International Company for Food Industries
- Website: cookdoor.com.eg

Cook Door is a chain of fast food restaurants based in Cairo, Egypt. It is one of Egypt's fast food chains, along with Smiley's Grill and Mo'men.

== History ==
Cook Door, founded in 1988, gained popularity within the Egyptian market/youth. Starting from just one branch in Heliopolis, until recently expanding within the last few years to multiple branches including other governorates.

== Outlets ==
=== Egypt ===
- Alexandria, 2
- Assuit
- Cairo
- Damietta
- El Mahalla El Kubra
- Giza
- Hurghada
- Ismailia
- Mansoura
- Marsa Matrouh
- North Coast (Marina)
- Port Said
- Sharm El Sheikh
- Suez
- Tanta
- Zagazig

=== Arab World ===
- Jeddah
- Riyadh
- Kuwait City
- Dubai (AlBarsha)
- Damascus (Cham City Center)
- Doha (Airport Branch & Villagio Branch)
