= SICO Technology =

Egyptian mobile phones and tablets manufacturer

- Company type: Private
- Industry: Mobile phones
- Founded: 2003
- Headquarters: Cairo, Egypt
- Number of locations: 3 Cairo, Egypt; Nairobi, Kenya; Dubai, UAE
- Area served: Africa and Middle East
- Products: Cell phones, Smartphones, Tablets
- Number of employees: 150
- Parent: ElSayed Salem Group
- Website: www.sico.com.eg

SICO Technology is an Egyptian corporation and technology company headquartered in Cairo, Egypt. Its main product lines include telecommunications equipment. The company manufactures mobile phones, tablets, and a range of 3G/4G mobile phones and smartphones which include the Nile X smartphone manufactured in Egypt. It was founded in 2003 with its headquarters in downtown Cairo, Egypt. The name of the company resembles its nature of business: a silicon industries company for manufacturing telecommunication technologies and products.

In December 2017, the company announced during the CairoICT annual conference the production of locally manufactured 4G Android smartphones in its Egypt plant located in the industrial zone of the city of Assiut.

== Company history ==
SICO has its roots in an old privately held soft drink company founded in 1948 and famous for its soft drinks. In the 1960s, however, it went public and as SICO Egypt and became the local bottler for Coca-Cola, which it remains today.

In 2003, engineer Mohamed Salem, son of the old company's founder, reestablished it with a focus on electronics. It initially provided electronic security and automation services to private and public sector companies and banks in Egypt.

In 2013, the company began entering the electronic device market by manufacturing devices in factories in China under the SICO brand and training Egyptian engineers there and in Germany, until it began partnering with the Silicon Oasis Company, a public firm affiliated with Egypt's Ministry of Communications and Information Technology. The factory was set up in the new Asyut Technology Park and currently produces 45% of the components for mobile phones released under the brand with the help of 500 engineers, of whom nearly 200 are residents of Asyut Governorate.
