= Air Sinai =

Airline of Egypt (1982–2021)

IATA	ICAO	Call sign
4D	ASD	AIR SINAI
- Founded: 1982
- Ceased operations: 2021
- Hubs: Cairo International Airport
- Focus cities: Ben Gurion Airport
- Fleet size: at time of service termination: 2
- Destinations: at time of service termination: 2
- Parent company: Egyptair Airlines Company
- Headquarters: Cairo, Egypt

Air Sinai (Arabic: سيناء للطيران Sīna' lil-Ṭayyarān) was an airline based in Cairo, Egypt. It operated as a 'paper airline' for parent company Egyptair under a wet lease-like agreement to serve flights exclusively between Egypt and Israel.

== History ==
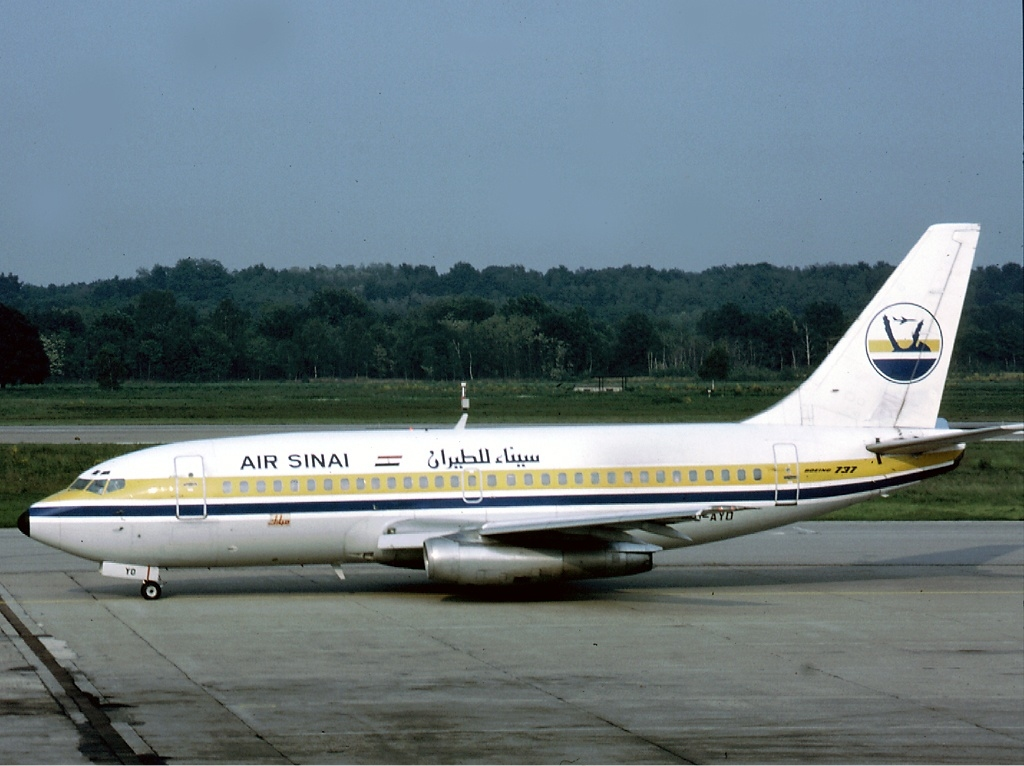
Air Sinai's livery in the 1980s

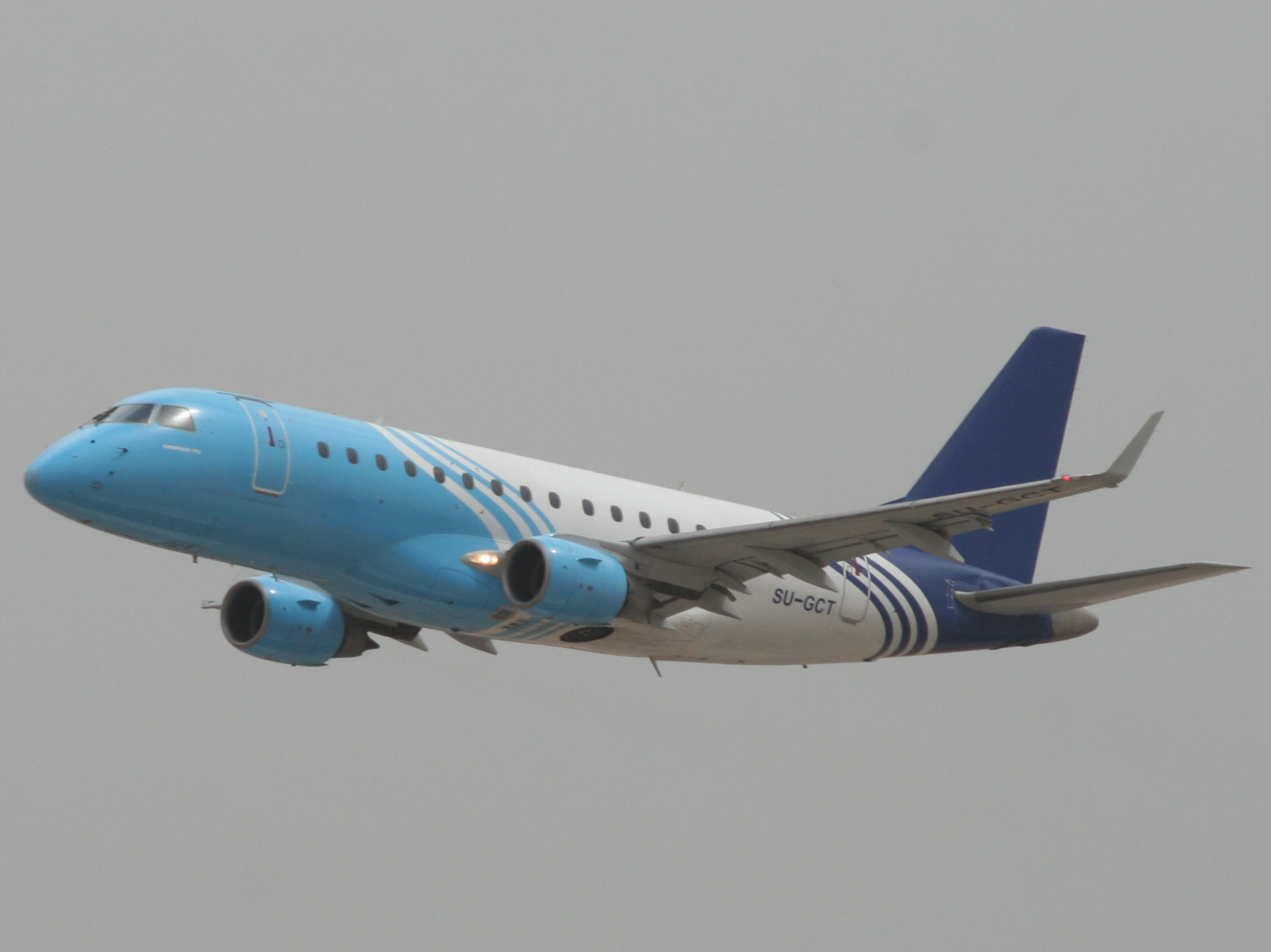
Unmarked Embraer 170 in basic Egyptair Express livery used by Air Sinai

The Egypt–Israel peace treaty signed in March 1979 stipulated that there must be active civilian aviation routes between Egypt and Israel. To fulfill the treaty, Air Sinai was established in 1982 to fly scheduled services between Egypt and Israel (on routes previously flown by Nefertiti Aviation), which for political reasons could not be handled by parent company Egyptair.

Services started using a Boeing 737-200 leased from Egyptair and new routes from Egypt's tourist destinations followed. By the mid-1980s a Fokker F27 Friendship was also in use on these services. During 1982, a Boeing 707-320C was leased and operated on behalf of Egyptair on their flights to Europe, especially twice weekly from Cairo to Copenhagen.

Due to the tense Egypt–Israel relations, the airline operated discreetly: for a long time it had no website, public schedule of flights, markings on planes, signs at the airports, or a way to make online bookings. Air Sinai ceased airline operations in its own right in 2002 and from then on operated as a 'paper airline' for its parent company, Egyptair, using their aircraft without any markings identifying either carrier, although some aircraft were spotted during this era in Tel Aviv in full Egyptair branding. Flights were not listed in Egyptair schedules and did not appear on their website or route maps either. As of 2014, Air Sinai flights were displayed on arrival and departure boards at Cairo Airport using the IATA code 4D. In February 2020, online booking was introduced via a website run by a third-party travel agency based in the United Kingdom.

On October 3, 2021, Egyptair commenced operating direct flights from Cairo to Tel Aviv under its livery, bringing an end to the Air Sinai era.

== Destinations ==
Until 2021, Air Sinai served the following destinations on behalf of Egyptair.

Egypt

- Cairo – Cairo International Airport

Israel

- Tel Aviv – Ben Gurion Airport

== Fleet ==
Due to the nature of its operations, Air Sinai used two unmarked Airbus A220 aircraft, SU-GFA & SU-GFD owned by Egyptair to operate its flights. Other types, including larger aircraft were also used based on operational requirements, with Egyptair markings then being removed. On some occasions, Egyptair branded aircraft have also been utilised.

In September 2019, it was announced the airline would replace Embraer 170 operations with Airbus A220 aircraft operated by Egyptair from 1 March 2020. In December 2019, the first Airbus A220 flight was moved forward to 9 December 2019.

In May 2021, Air Sinai's Airbus A220 have been removed from service, and subsequently begun flying for Nigeria's Ibom Air.

== See also ==
Airlines created for political reasons:

- Australia Asia Airlines
- Air France Asie
- British Asia Airways
- KLM Asia
- Japan Asia Airlines
- Swissair Asia
