= Air Leisure =

Egyptian charter airline

IATA	ICAO	Call sign
AL	ALD	AIR LEISURE
- Founded: 2014
- Commenced operations: 2015
- Ceased operations: 22 October 2018
- Hubs: Cairo International Airport
- Fleet size: 3
- Destinations: 5
- Headquarters: Cairo, Egypt
- Website: www.air-leisure.com

Air Leisure was an Egyptian charter airline headquartered in Cairo and based in Cairo International Airport. It connected several Asian cities, mainly in China, with Egyptian leisure destinations.

== History ==
In 2013, Air Memphis, an Egyptian charter airline was acquired and began new operations under the name of Air Leisure, operating charter flights to destinations in North and Northeast Africa, the Middle East and Europe using an MD-83 transferred from Air Memphis.

In December 2014, the airline acquired the first of three Airbus A340-200 aircraft, which had previously been operated by Egyptair. This led to the airline being the only operator of the A340-200 in the world until 2017 when the airline phased the aircraft out in favour of the younger, more fuel efficient Airbus A330-200.

In February 2016, it was announced that the airline had signed a letter of intent with Sukhoi Civil Aircraft for the purchase of four Sukhoi Superjet 100 aircraft with an option for six more. In December 2016, it was announced that the airline had acquired 3 used A330s previously operated by Emirates. These aircraft are used to replace the fleet of A340s. The first aircraft arrived in Cairo on 27 December 2016.

On 22 October 2018, it has been announced that Air Leisure suspended its operations.

== Destinations ==
As of January 2018, Air Leisure served the following destinations:

China

- Beijing - Beijing Capital International Airport
- Shanghai - Shanghai Pudong International Airport
- Xi'an - Xi'an Xianyang International Airport

Egypt

- Aswan - Aswan International Airport
- Cairo - Cairo International Airport

== Fleet ==
=== Final Fleet ===
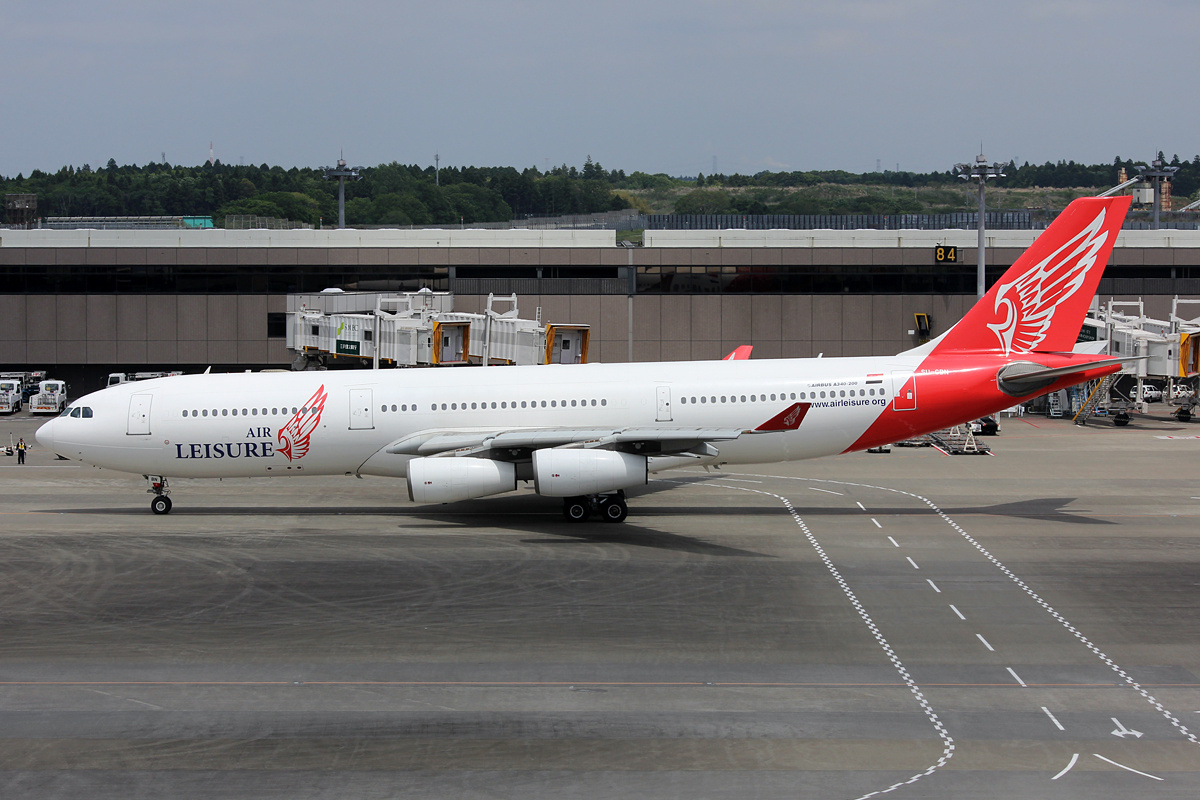
Former Air Leisure Airbus A340-200

As of August 2019, the Air Leisure fleet consisted of the following aircraft:

Air Leisure fleet
Aircraft	In Service	Orders	Passengers				Notes
Aircraft	In Service	Orders	F	C	Y	Total	Notes
Airbus A340-200	3	—	12	42	183	237	
Sukhoi Superjet 100	—	4	TBA				
Total	3	4					

=== Former fleet ===
The airline previously operated the following aircraft:

- Airbus A340-200
- McDonnell Douglas MD-83
