= Misr Overseas Airways =

Airline of Egypt

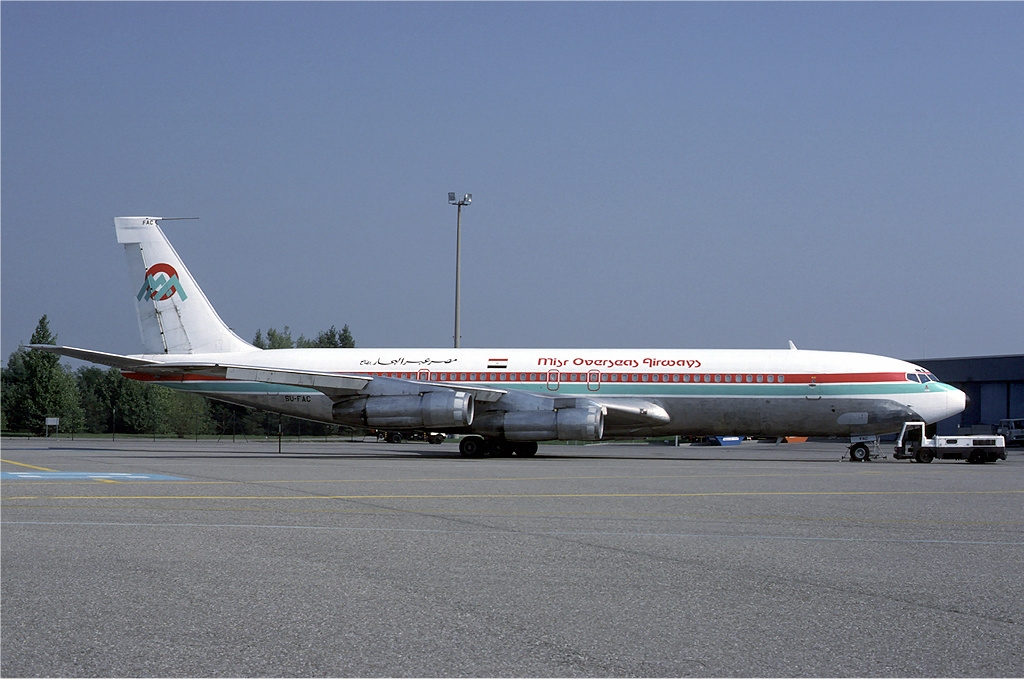
- Misr Overseas Airways Boeing 707 at Basle Airport in 1986.
IATA	ICAO	Call sign
MO	MOS	-
- Commenced operations: 1981
- Ceased operations: 1989
- Destinations: Cologne, Germany; Maribor, Slovenia; Khartoum, Sudan
- Headquarters: Cairo. Eypt

Misr Overseas Airways was an Egyptian scheduled and charter airline based in Cairo.

The airline was formed in 1981 as Air Lease Egypt and renamed Misr Overseas Airways in January 1984. In 1988, the airline operated scheduled cargo flights to Cologne, Maribor and Khartoum, and charter flights to Africa, Asia, Europe and Latin America.

The airline ceased operations in 1989.

== Code data ==
- IATA: MO
- ICAO: MOS
