= Shorouk Air =

Charter airline of Egypt

- Shorouk Air logo

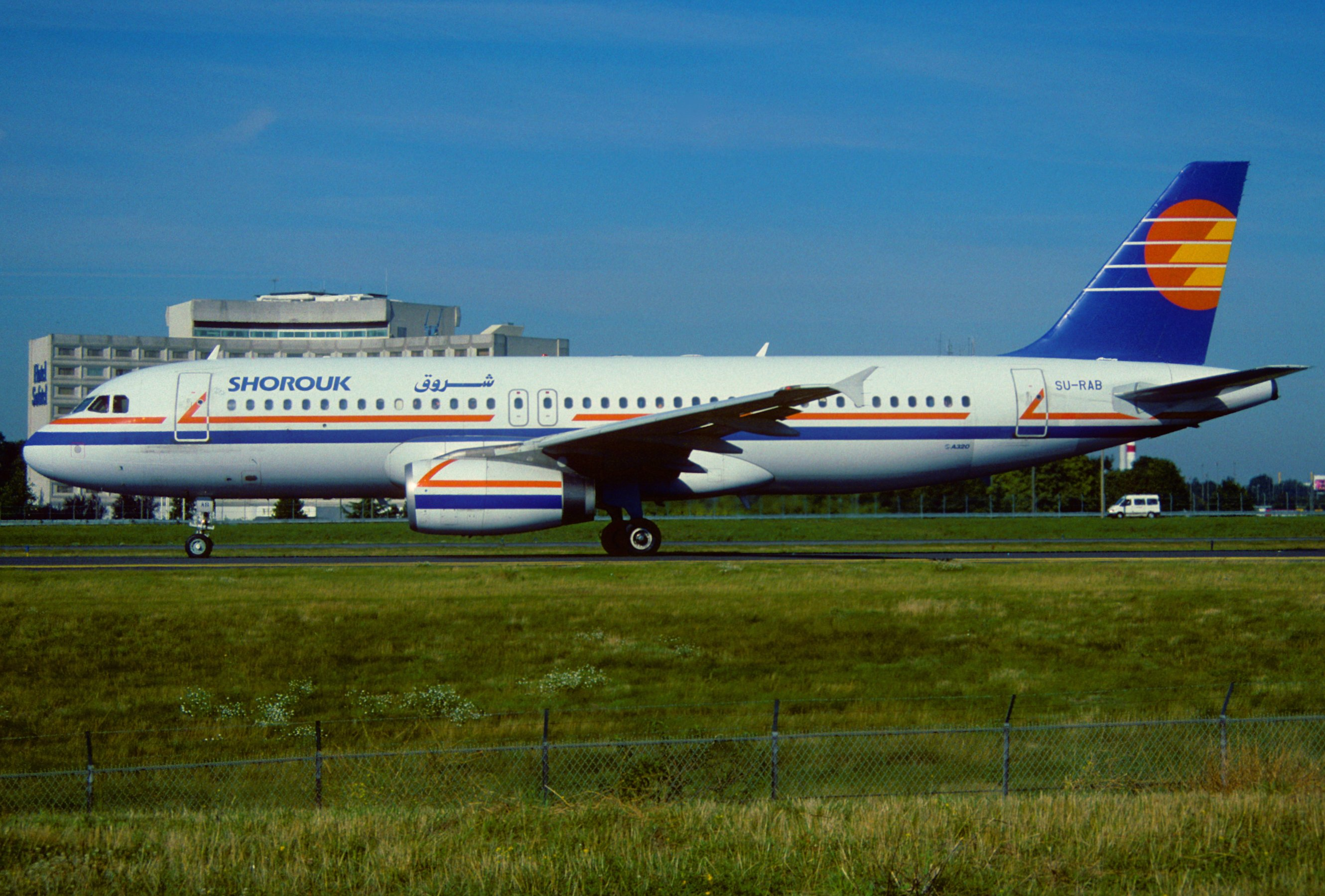
- Shorouk Air Airbus A320-231
IATA	ICAO	Call sign
7Q	SHK	Shorouk
- Commenced operations: 1992
- Ceased operations: 2003
- Fleet size: See Fleet below
- Parent company: Egyptair and Kuwait Airways
- Headquarters: Egypt

Shorouk Air (ICAO Code: SHK; IATA Code: 7Q; Callsign: SHOROUK) was an Egyptian charter airline that operated between 1992 and 2003.

== History ==
The airline was established in 1991 by Egyptair and Kuwait Airways as a regional charter carrier named Egyptian-Kuwait Air Services Company, and renamed to Shorouk Air the following year. The airline ceased operations on 17 July 2003.

== Fleet ==
The airline operated:

- 8 Airbus A320
- 2 Boeing 757-200
- 2 Boeing 757-200PF
