= BiscoMisr =

Egyptian food company

BiscoMisr بسكومصر
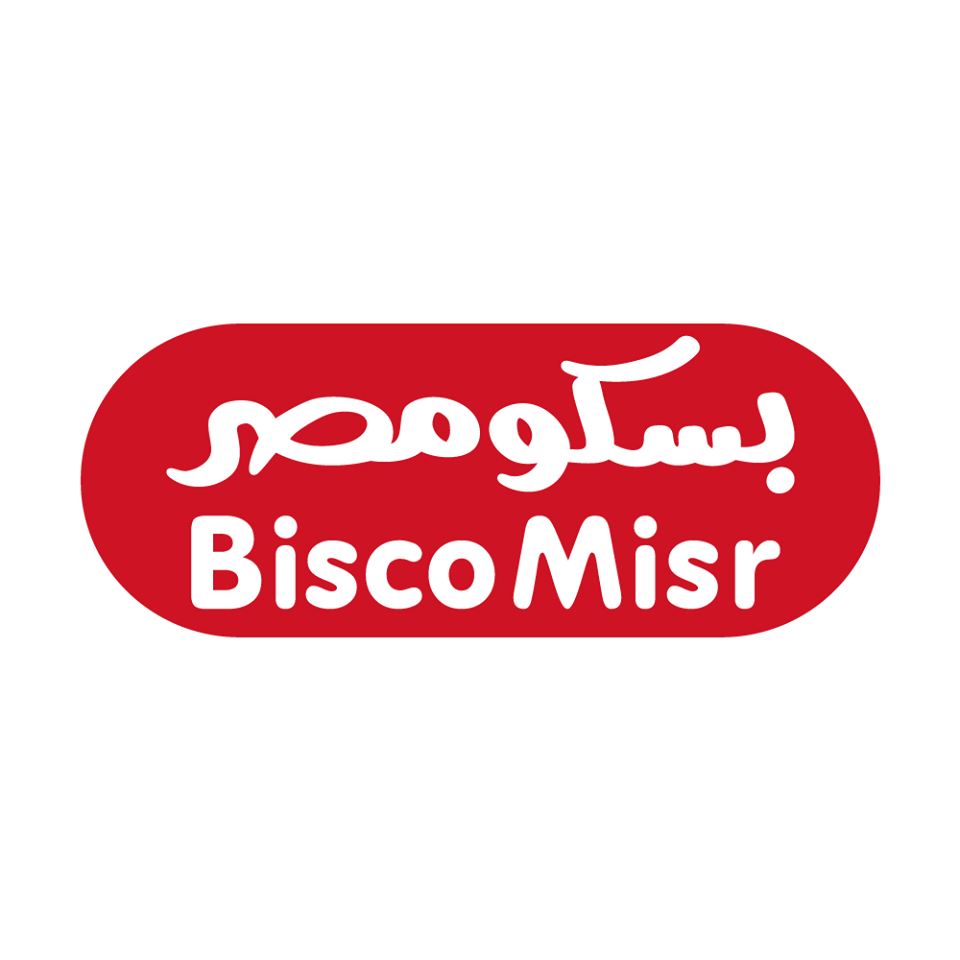
- Type: Subsidiary of HSA Group
- Industry: Food industry
- Headquarters: Cairo, Egypt
- Key people: Amr Farghal (Chairman)
- Website: Official website

BiscoMisr is the largest biscuits company in Egypt and one of the top 5 biscuit companies in the Middle East and Africa. It was established in 1957 during Egypt’s nationalization program as the Egyptian Company for Foods which has been the country’s main provider of baked goods and confectionery at that time.

== History ==
The company was established with the purpose of supplying the army and the national schools at the time, providing a quick energy snack for the soldiers in the barracks as well as the school children on the playground. At the same time, BiscoMisr was the main confectionery supplier for the local market. For decades Bisco Misr acted as the trusted supplier for schools, governmental organizations, the army and the traditional market.

BiscoMisr was handed over from the public sector to the private sector at the height of the revived privatization program in 2005. Since then, the company has seen a total makeover of BiscoMisr’s name.

The company was put up for partial sale in 1999 when the privatization process was on a roll. The private investor bought a stake in the company but did not take an active management at the time.

Just six years later, on January 16, 2005, BiscoMisr was fully privatized. The new shareholders took over the management in May 2005.

In January 2015, Bisco Misr became a subsidiary of the Kellogg Company.

On 10 September 2024, Hayel Saeed Anam Group signed an agreement to acquire Kellanova’s (formerly Kellog Company) shares of Bisco Misr. The transaction is expected to be closed by Q1 2025.
