= Egyptian wine =

Wine making in Egypt

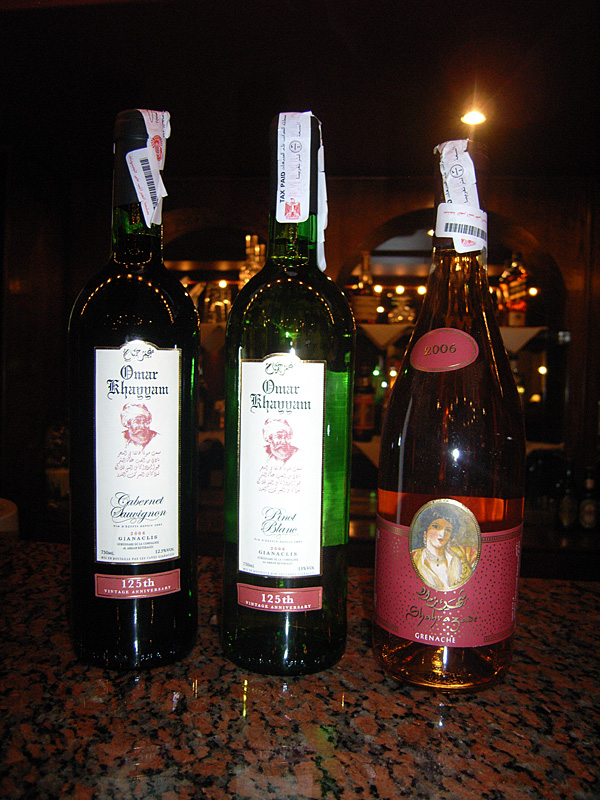
Omar Khayyam and Shahrazade bottles from Gianaclis Vineyards.

Winemaking has a long tradition in Egypt dating back to the 3rd millennium BC. The modern wine industry is relatively small scale but there have been significant strides towards reviving the industry. In the late nineties the industry invited international expertise in a bid to improve the quality of Egyptian wine, which used to be known for its poor quality. In recent years Egyptian wines have received some recognition, having won several international awards. In 2013 Egypt produced 4,500 tonnes of wine, ranking 54th globally, ahead of Belgium and the United Kingdom.

== Climate ==
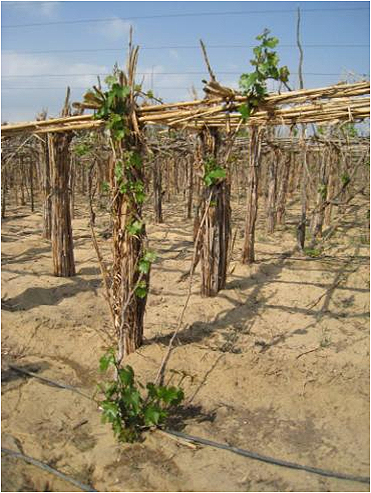
A vineyard in Egypt using pergola structures and drip irrigation.

High average temperatures and poor rainfall present a major challenge for Egyptian grape producers. To overcome these difficulties vineyards in Egypt apply innovative solutions, such as using pergolas to shade the plants and palm trees to shield them from winds as well as transporting the harvest in refrigerated trucks.

Before the construction of the Aswan High Dam the annual flooding of the Nile (Egyptian Arabic: وفاء النيل Wafa' El Nil) provided fertile and hydrated soil for the vines, and the stable weather conditions made it a competitive location for the cultivation of wine grapes. After the construction of the dam in 1970 the annual flooding stopped. Today vineyards in Egypt use drip irrigation to make up for the lack of rain.

== Grape varieties ==
At the time the state-owned Al Ahram Beverages Company was privatized in 1997 all noble grapes that had previously been planted by its subsidiary, Gianaclis Vineyards, were lost. This meant that grapes had to be imported, mainly from Lebanon. This coincided with a boom in the tourism industry which meant wineries had to produce cheap wine in large quantities to meet the surging demand from Western tourists. Due to the lack of locally produced wine grapes wineries imported concentrated juice from Europe which would be diluted with water and fermented, contributing to the negative reputation of Egyptian wine. The Gianaclis Vineyards started planting vines again in 2004 in Alexandria and Luxor. By 2010 only 2% of their wines were made with Lebanese grapes, with Egyptian grapes used for the remainder of their production. The industry has in recent years started experimenting with international varieties to find grapes that are suited for the Egyptian climate. The main varieties used in red wines are Cabernet Sauvignon, Syrah, Grenache, Bobal and Tempranillo, while Viognier, Chardonnay and Muscat are used for white wines.

Koroum of the Nile, a winery based in El Gouna, cultivates an indigenous grape variety known as Bannati which is used in its Beausoleil white wine. In 2016 the wine won a silver medal at the International Wine Contest in Brussels. The grapes are grown at their vineyard by the Nile in central Egypt, near Beni Hasan, an ancient Egyptian site.

== History ==
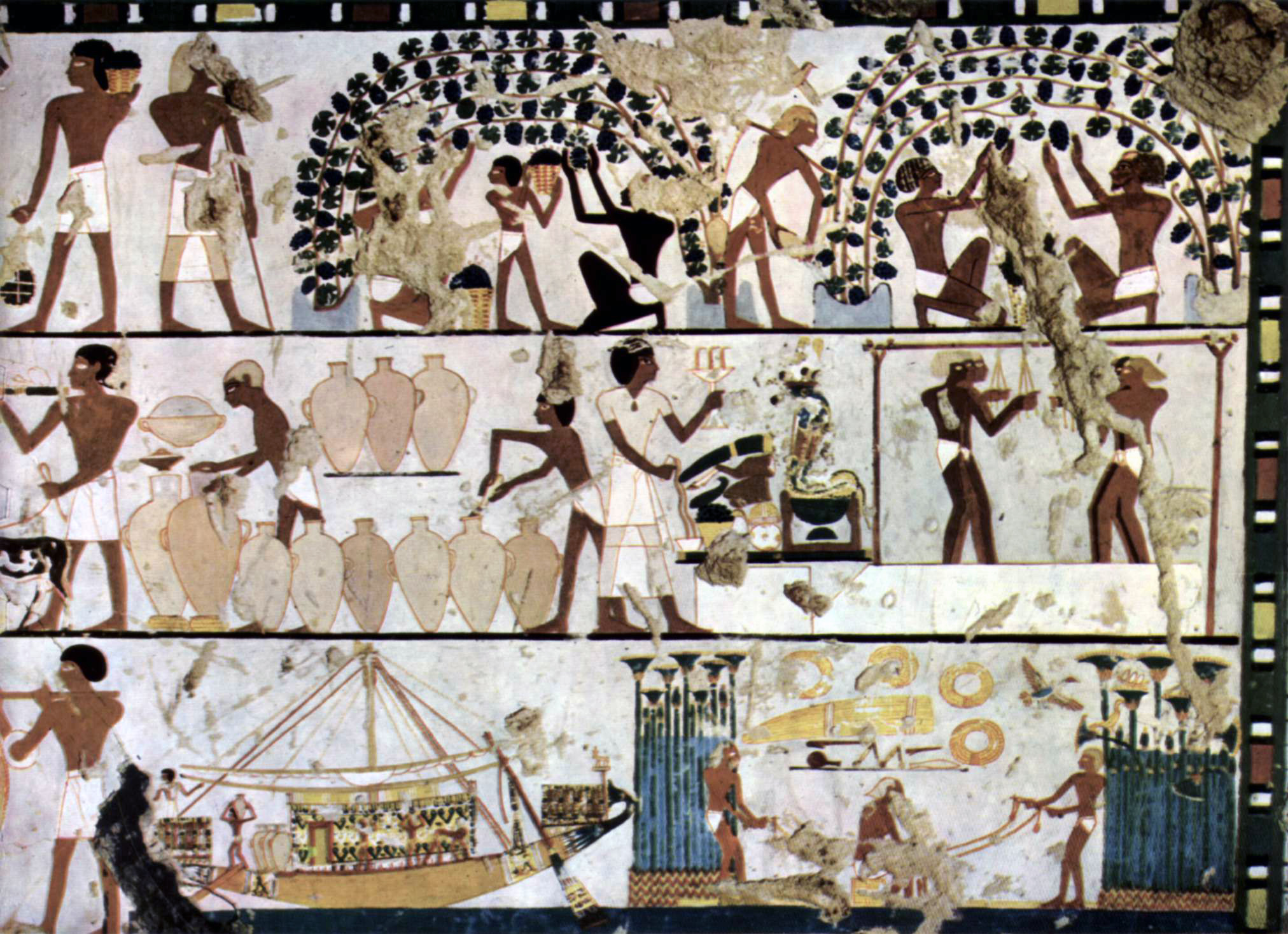
Grape cultivation, winemaking, and commerce in ancient Egypt c. 1500 BC.

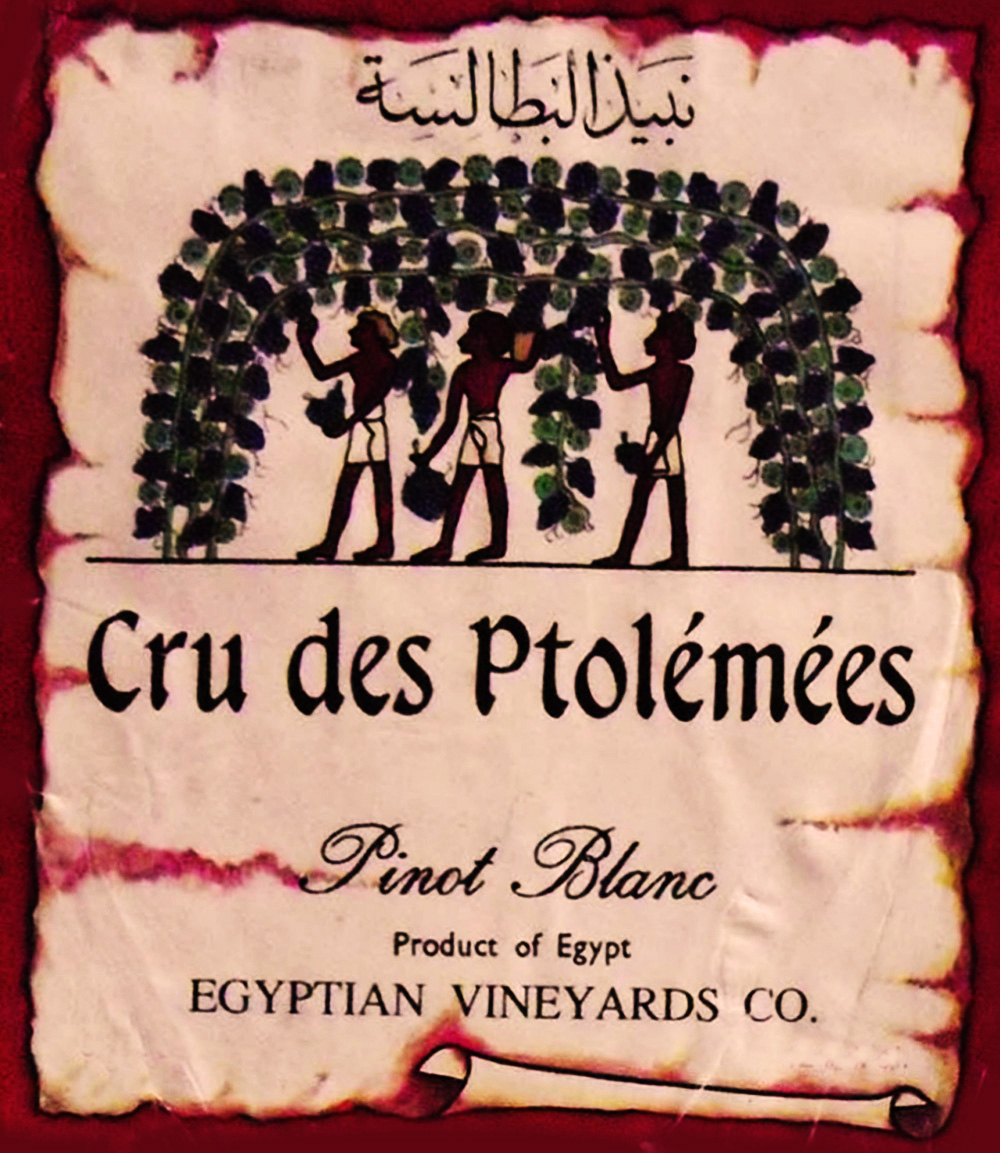
An Egyptian wine label from the 1930s.

Wine was a staple commodity in ancient Egypt. It played an important role in ancient Egyptian ceremonial life. A thriving royal winemaking industry was established in the Nile Delta following the introduction of grape cultivation from the Levant to Egypt c. 3000 BC. The industry was most likely the result of trade between Egypt and Canaan during the early Bronze Age, commencing from at least the 27th-century BC Third Dynasty, the beginning of the Old Kingdom period. Winemaking scenes on tomb walls, and the offering lists that accompanied them, included wine that was definitely produced in the delta vineyards. By the end of the Old Kingdom, five distinct wines, probably all produced in the Delta, constituted a canonical set of provisions for the afterlife.

Wine in ancient Egypt was predominantly red. Due to its resemblance to blood, much superstition surrounded wine-drinking in Egyptian culture. Shedeh, the most precious drink in ancient Egypt, is now known to have been a red wine and not fermented from pomegranates as previously thought. Plutarch's Moralia relates that, prior to Psammetichus I, the pharaohs did not drink wine nor offer it to the gods "thinking it to be the blood of those who had once battled against the gods and from whom, when they had fallen and had become commingled with the earth, they believed vines to have sprung". This was considered to be the reason why drunkenness "drives men out of their senses and crazes them, inasmuch as they are then filled with the blood of their forebears".

Residue from five clay amphoras in Tutankhamun's tomb, however, have been shown to be that of white wine, so it was at least available to the Egyptians through trade if not produced domestically.

Winemaking continued to be part of Egyptian culture during Roman rule in Egypt. Christians constituted the majority of Egypt’s population by the 3rd century, despite a reserved attitude towards alcohol in the Church of Alexandria monasteries are known have stored and produced large quantities of wine. In 2008 two wine presses dating back to Roman rule in Egypt were unearthed near Saint Catherine's Monastery in Sinai, along with ancient coins from Antioch, which could indicate that Egyptian wine was exported to Christians in the region.

The production of wine declined significantly after the Muslim conquest of Egypt in the 7th century. Attitudes towards alcohol varied greatly under Islamic rule, Muslim rulers generally showed some level of tolerance towards alcohol production controlled by religious minorities. Jewish manuscripts from the Cairo Geniza recount the involvement of Egyptian Jews in the production and sale of wine in medieval Egypt. The consumption of wine was not necessarily limited to religious minorities however. Western travelers and pilgrims passing through Cairo on their journeys reported that Muslim locals imbibed on wine and a local barley beer, known as "booza" (Egyptian Arabic: بوظة, not to be confused with the Levantine ice cream of the same name), even during the most draconian periods of Islamic rule. The most popular wine was known as "nebit shamsi" (Egyptian Arabic: نبيذ شمسي), made from imported raisins and honey and left to ferment in the sun (hence the name, which roughly translates into "sun wine").

Viticulture was revived in Egypt by Greek-Egyptian tobacco merchant and entrepreneur, Nestor Gianaclis, who founded the country's first modern vineyard south of Alexandria in 1882. The country's wine industry expanded under the early 20th century, until the Egyptian revolution of 1952 which saw the country's liberal monarchy unseated, in favor of a presidential system. In 1963 Egyptian president Gamal Abdel Nasser nationalized and merged breweries and vineyards in the country, under the previously Belgian-owned Pyramid Brewery, which later came to be known as Al Ahram Beverages Company. Mismanagement under state-ownership and an increasingly religious population contributed to the industry's gradual decline. The company was privatized in 1997, at the height of its ruination, part of an economic reform program that sought to restructure the country's economy. This was viewed as a turning-point for the alcohol industry as a whole in Egypt. Its new owner, Egyptian businessman Ahmed Zayat, restructured the company and introduced a line of non-alcoholic beverages that would appeal to the conservative segment of the population. The company was sold to Heineken International in 2002 for $280 million.

== See also ==
- Egyptian cuisine
- Beer in Egypt
- Winemaking
