= Nefertiti Airlines =

Short-lived airline

IATA	ICAO	Call sign
–	–	–
- Founded: 1980
- Ceased operations: 1982
- Hubs: Sir Seretse Khama Airport
- Fleet size: 1 – Boeing 707-321B
- Destinations: Tel Aviv
- Headquarters: Cairo, Egypt

Nefertiti Airlines, sometimes known as Nefertiti Aviation was a short-lived airline that operated from 1980–1982. It provided charter service and flights between Cairo and Tel Aviv that EgyptAir could not. The route was later served by Air Sinai, and, starting October 2021, by EgyptAir.

Elhamy Elzayat, former honorary consul in Egypt is credited with helping establish tourism between Egypt and Israel. and these flights were considered key to the establishment of Israeli-Egyptian relations.
