= AMC Airlines =

Egyptian charter airline

IATA	ICAO	Call sign
YJ	AMV	AMC AIRLINES
- Founded: 1988; 38 years ago
- Hubs: Cairo International Airport
- Secondary hubs: Hurghada International Airport; Sharm el-Sheikh International Airport; Luxor International Airport
- Fleet size: 42
- Headquarters: Cairo, Egypt
- Key people: El-Sayed Saber (President) Sherif Saber (Vice President)
- Website: www.amcairlines.com

AMC Airlines is a charter airline based in Cairo, Egypt. It operates charter flights from Egypt's tourist destinations to Europe, regular charters to the Middle East as well as domestic flights. The airline also operates ad hoc VIP flights and military transport (for the United Nations). Its main base is Cairo International Airport, with hubs at Hurghada International Airport, Sharm el-Sheikh International Airport and Luxor International Airport.

== History ==
The airline was established and started operations in 1988, after the Egyptian government approved the foundation of Aircraft Maintenance in Cairo. At that time, Elsayed Saber and his family launched AMC Airlines after obtaining a license to operate worldwide passenger charter operations. It is wholly owned by Saber and his family, and has 498 employees. The airline was initially named AMC Aviation before becoming 'AMC Airlines' in 2005 .

== Destinations ==
The majority of the airline's operations are charter flights to Europe.

== Fleet ==
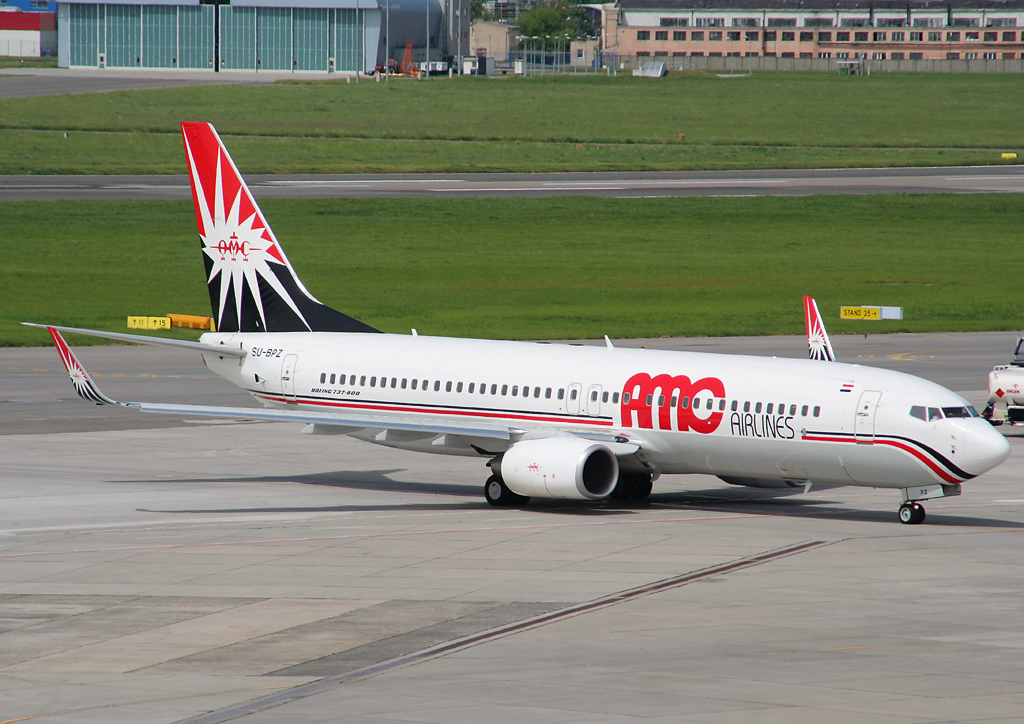
Boeing 737-800 of AMC Airlines

As of August 2025, AMC Airlines operates the following aircraft:

AMC Airlines fleet
Aircraft	In service	Orders	Passengers	Notes
Airbus A320-200	42	—		
Total	42			

Since 2006 the airline has frequently leased Boeing 737-800s from Eurocypria. AMC historical fleet was Boeing 737-200, Airbus A300B4 and Boeing 737-800

== See also ==
- List of airlines of Egypt
