= Air Memphis =

Charter airline based in Cairo, Egypt

IATA	ICAO	Call sign
E9	MHS	AIR MEMPHIS
- Founded: 1995; 30 years ago
- Ceased operations: 2013; 12 years ago
- Hubs: Cairo International Airport
- Headquarters: Cairo, Egypt
- Key people: Hamdy Eisa (Chairman)
- Website: www.airmemphis.com.eg

Air Memphis was a charter airline based in Cairo, Egypt. Its main base was Cairo International Airport.

== History ==
The airline was established in August 1995 and started operations in March 1996. It had branches in Sharm ِAl Sheikh, Hurghada, Luxor, Aswan, and Abu Simbel. It had 530 employees as of March 2010; the airline was bought by Ramy Lakah in 2013 and had a new CEO, Khalid Hassanain. The company did some flights to Iran; later, the new owner changed the airline's name to Air Leisure,

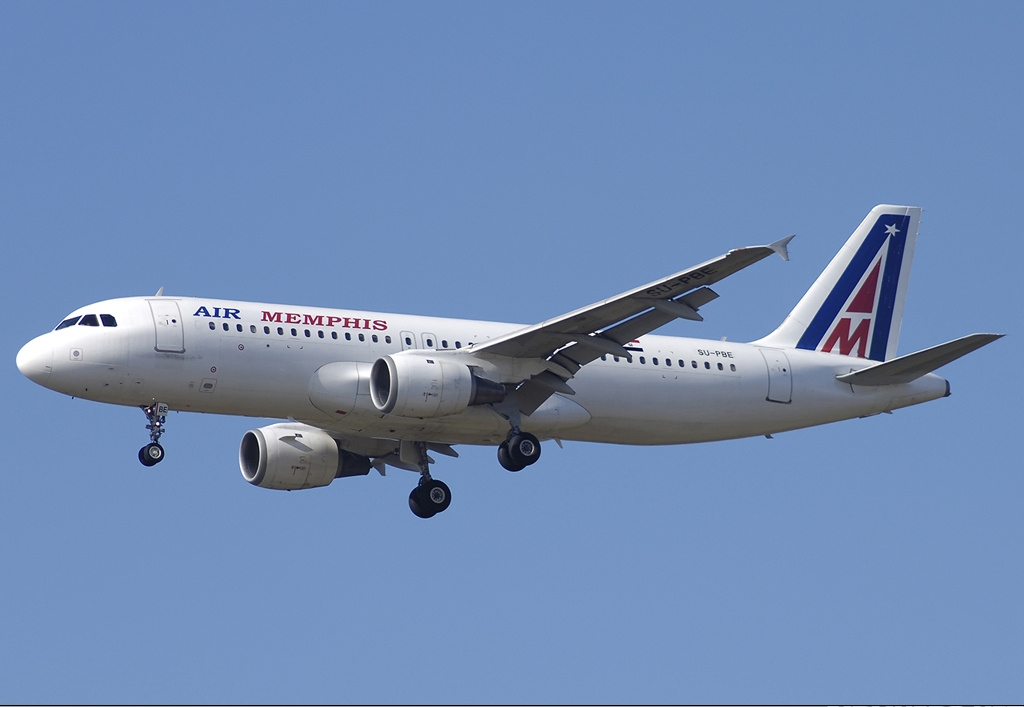
An Air Memphis Airbus A320-200.

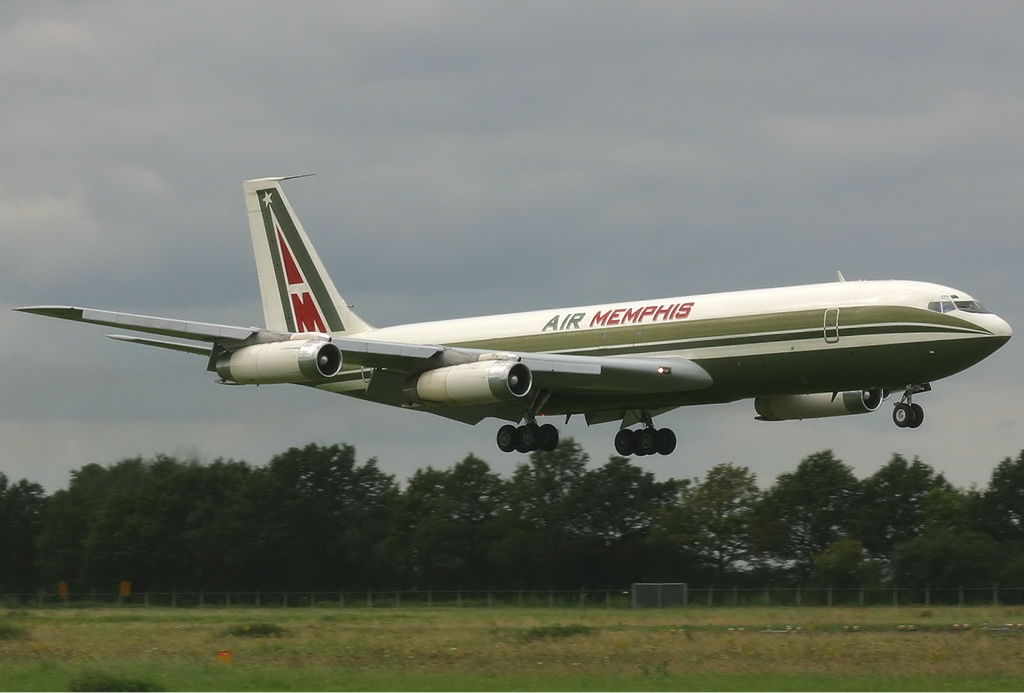
An Air Memphis Boeing 707.

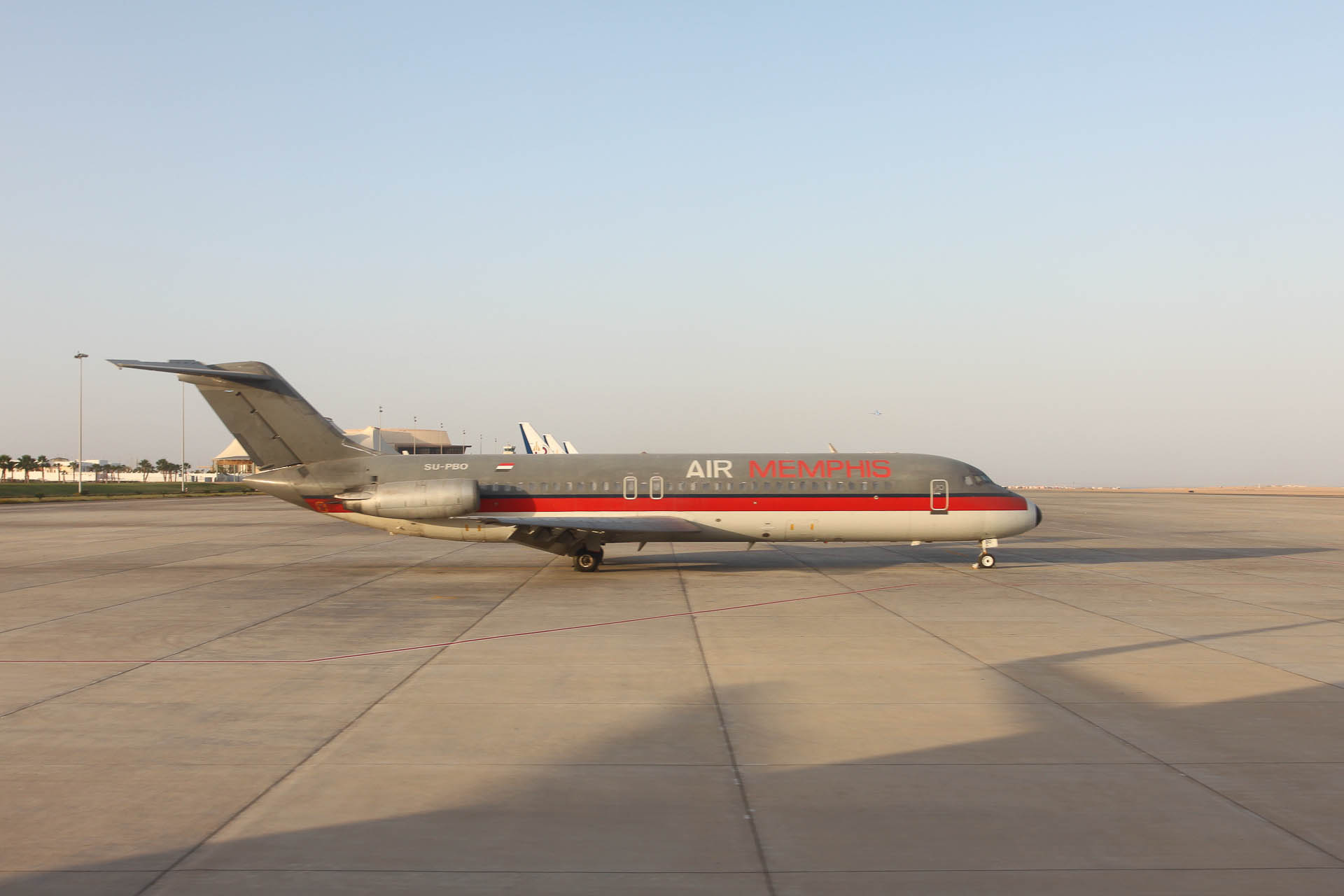
McDonnell Douglas DC-9 at Sharm el-Sheikh International Airport

== Fleet ==
As of December 2016 Air Memphis does not operate any aircraft.
