= Tristar Air =

Egyptian cargo airline

IATA	ICAO	Call sign
YS	TSY	TRIPLE STAR
- Founded: 1998
- Ceased operations: Continued
- Hubs: Cairo International Airport
- Fleet size: 1
- Destinations: 2 (scheduled)
- Parent company: Jet Link Holland
- Headquarters: Cairo, Egypt
- Key people: Alaa El Din Rahmy, President
- Website: tristarair.nl

Tristar Air is an Egyptian cargo airline headquartered in Cairo with its base at Cairo International Airport.

== History ==
The airline established in 1998 and started operations in September that year to-date. It is owned by the Messeh family; Sobhy Abd El Messeh (98%), Sabry Botros Messeh (1%), and Fortunee Botros Messeh (1%) and employed 80 staff. On 12 October 2015, a new shares majority structure is currently owned by Michael Abdel Messeh.

== Destinations ==
The airline operates scheduled cargo services linking Cairo with Amsterdam in addition to cargo charter flights to various destinations.

== Fleet ==
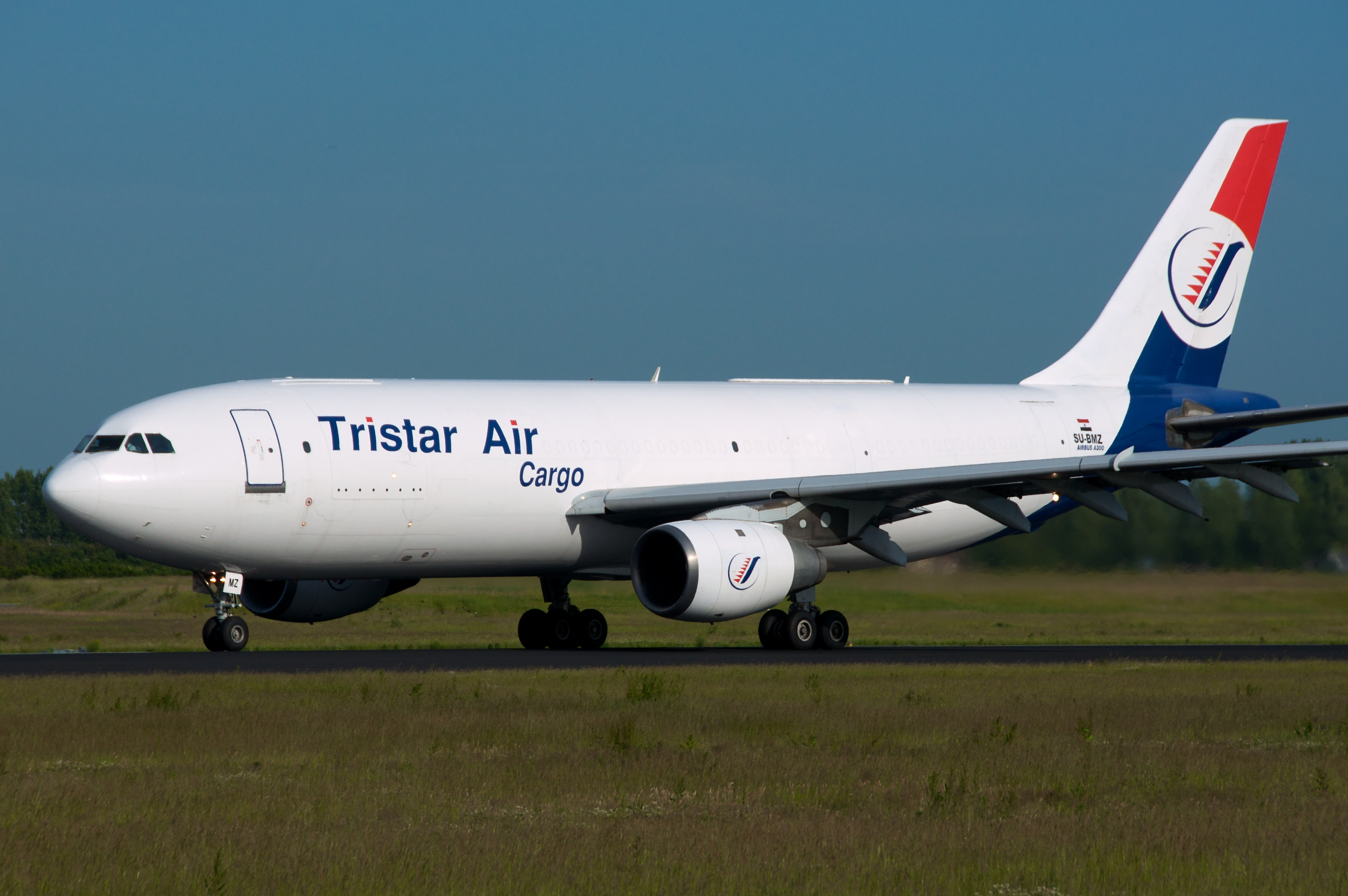
Tristar Air Airbus A300B4-200F

As of 15 October 2015, Tristar Air did no longer operate any aircraft. Previously it owned one single Airbus A300B4-200F.

== Accidents and incidents ==
- On 12 October 2015, Tristar Air Flight 810 was forced to land on a road near Aden Adde International Airport in Mogadishu, Somalia. Somali Authorities reported the aircraft had attempted several approaches to the airport but had gone around each time because the flight crew lost visual reference to the runway. The flight departed late from Cairo, and as a consequence reached Moghadishu after sunset. The airfield does not have runway lights and is closed from sunset until sunrise. After several attempts, the flight had run out of fuel, making the emergency landing necessary. Of the six people on board the cargo flight incoming from Ostend in Belgium, two received minor injuries in the landing while the aircraft sustained substantial damage beyond economic repair.
