= Air Arabia Egypt =

Low-cost airline of Egypt

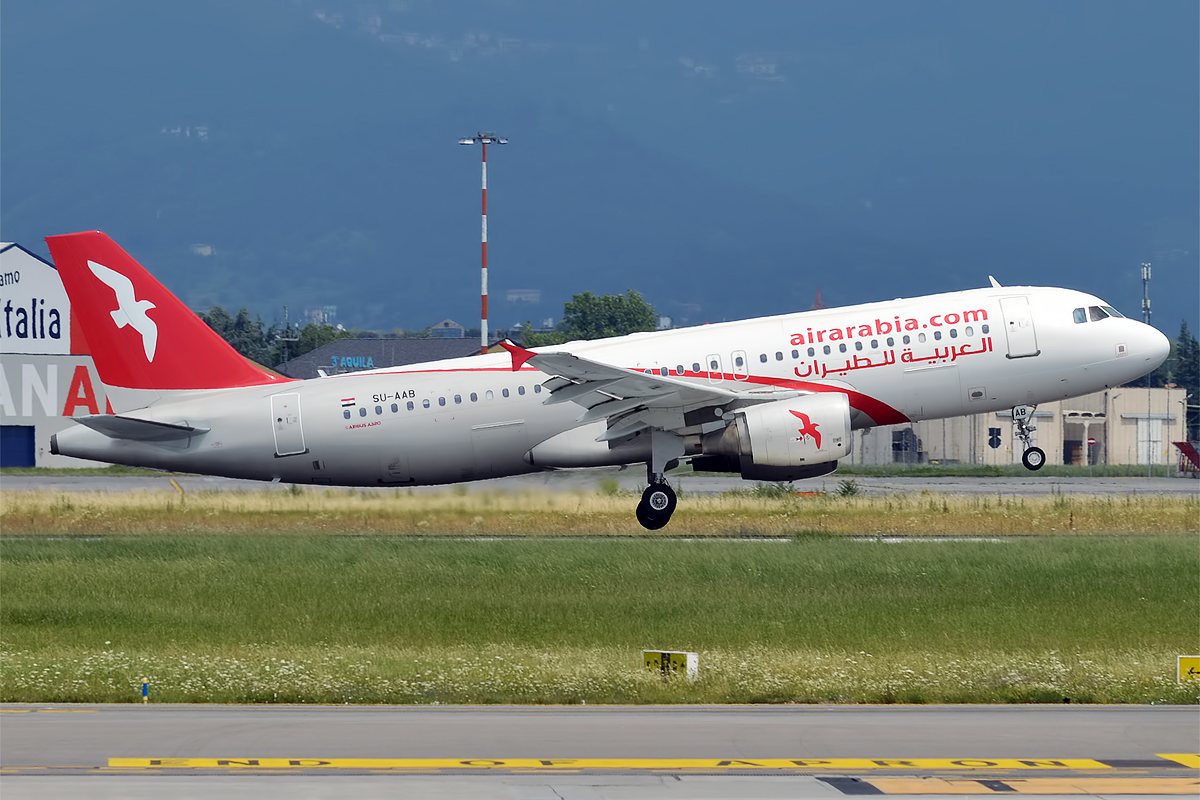
- Air Arabia Egypt A320 in old livery
IATA	ICAO	Call sign
E5	RBG	ARABIA EGYPT
- Founded: 9 September 2009; 17 years ago
- Commenced operations: 1 June 2010; 16 years ago
- Operating bases: Borg El Arab; Cairo
- Frequent-flyer program: AirRewards
- Fleet size: 4
- Destinations: 18
- Parent company: Air Arabia
- Headquarters: Cairo, Egypt
- Key people: Emad Salem - CEO
- Website: www.airarabia.com

Air Arabia Egypt (Arabic: العربية للطيران مصر) is an Egyptian low-cost airline based in Alexandria. The airline is a subsidiary of Air Arabia. The head office is in Heliopolis, Cairo, Egypt.

The airline secured it operating license from the Egyptian authorities on the 22 May 2010 and began commercial operations on 1 June 2010. The airline is based at Alexandria's Borg El Arab Airport.

== History ==
Air Arabia Egypt is one of Air Arabia Group companies. The airline offers low-cost travel to a number of destinations across the region. The company focuses on booking online. Air Arabia Egypt also provides booking facilities through call centers, travel agents, appointed GSA's and sales shops.

== Operations ==
During the Arab Air Carriers' Organization conference in October 2009, Air Arabia CEO Adel Ali indicated that the new airline would operate from Alexandria and a Red Sea station (either Sharm el-Sheikh or Hurghada) as well as Cairo. "Egypt has different needs," he says, in contrast to the single bases established by Air Arabia in Sharjah and Morocco.

== Destinations ==
As of December 2025, the airline flies to the following destinations:

Country	City	Airport	Notes	Refs
Egypt	Alexandria	Alexandria International Airport	Hub	
Egypt	Assiut	Assiut Airport	Terminated	
Egypt	Cairo	Cairo International Airport	Hub	
Egypt	Luxor	Luxor International Airport	Terminated	
Egypt	Sharm El Sheikh	Sharm El Sheikh International Airport	Terminated	
Egypt	Sohag	Sohag International Airport	Terminated	
Italy	Bergamo	Orio al Serio International Airport		
Italy	Naples	Naples International Airport	Terminated	
Jordan	Amman	Queen Alia International Airport		
Kuwait	Kuwait City	Kuwait International Airport		
Lebanon	Beirut	Beirut–Rafic Hariri International Airport		
Oman	Muscat	Muscat International Airport		
Saudi Arabia	Abha	Abha International Airport		
Saudi Arabia	Dammam	King Fahd International Airport		
Saudi Arabia	Gassim	Prince Naif bin Abdulaziz International Airport		
Saudi Arabia	Hail	Hail International Airport		
Saudi Arabia	Jeddah	King Abdulaziz International Airport		
Saudi Arabia	Jizan	King Abdullah International Airport		
Saudi Arabia	Riyadh	King Khalid International Airport		
Saudi Arabia	Tabuk	Tabuk Regional Airport		
Saudi Arabia	Ta'if	Taif International Airport		
Saudi Arabia	Yanbu	Yanbu Airport	Terminated	
Turkey	Istanbul	Sabiha Gökçen International Airport		

== Fleet ==
=== Current fleet ===
As of July 2026, Air Arabia Egypt operates the following aircraft:

Air Arabia Egypt fleet
Aircraft	In service	Orders	Passengers	Notes
Airbus A320	4	—	174	
Total	4	—		

=== Former fleet ===
As of August 2025, Air Arabia Egypt operated 4 Airbus A320.

The airline's fleet will center around the Airbus A320 (as operated by Air Arabia). The airline currently operates four aircraft leased from Air Arabia.
