= Bisha Domestic Airport =

Bisha Domestic Airport مطار بيشة المحلي
- IATA: BHH; ICAO: OEBH

Summary
- Airport type: Public / Military
- Operator: General Authority of Civil Aviation
- Serves: Bisha
- Location: 'Asir Province, Saudi Arabia
- Elevation AMSL: 3,887 ft / 1,185 m
- Coordinates: 19°59′03″N 042°37′15″E

Map
- Location of airport in Saudi Arabia

Runways
Direction	Length		Surface
Direction	m	ft	Surface
18/36	3,050	10,007	Asphalt

Bisha Domestic Airport (Arabic: مطار بيشة المحلي, IATA: BHH, ICAO: OEBH) is an airport serving Bisha, in 'Asir Province, in southwest Saudi Arabia. It opened on 1 June 1976.

== Facilities ==
The airport resides at an elevation of 3,887 feet (1,185 m) above mean sea level. It has one runway designated 18/36 with an asphalt surface measuring 3,050 by 45 metres (10,007 ft × 148 ft).

== Airlines and destinations ==
Airlines	Destinations
Flyadeal	Dammam
Flynas	Abha, Riyadh
Saudia	Dammam, Jeddah, Riyadh

== See also ==
- Arar Domestic Airport
- List of airports in Saudi Arabia
- Saudia
