= Arar Domestic Airport =

Airport in Saudi Arabia

Arar Domestic Airport مطار عرعر المحلي
- IATA: RAE; ICAO: OERR

Summary
- Airport type: Public
- Owner: General Authority of Civil Aviation
- Operator: General Authority of Civil Aviation
- Serves: Arar City
- Location: Arar, Northern Borders Province, Saudi Arabia
- Opened: June 1, 1981; 45 years ago
- Elevation AMSL: 1,813 ft / 553 m
- Coordinates: 30°54′23″N 041°08′17″E

Map
- Location of airport in Saudi Arabia

Runways
Direction	Length		Surface
Direction	m	ft	Surface
10/28	3,050	10,007	Asphalt

Arar Domestic Airport (IATA: RAE, ICAO: OERR) is an airport serving the city of Arar, the seat of the Northern Borders Province of Saudi Arabia.

== Facilities ==
The airport resides at an elevation of 1,813 feet (553 m) above mean sea level. It has one runway designated as 10/28 with an asphalt surface measuring 3,050 by 45 metres (10,007 ft × 148 ft).

== Airlines and destinations ==
=== Passenger ===
Airlines	Destinations
Flyadeal	Riyadh
Flynas	Dammam, Riyadh
Nesma Airlines	Hail
Nile Air	Cairo
Saudia	Jeddah, Riyadh

== See also ==
- Transport in Saudi Arabia
- List of airports in Saudi Arabia
