= Prince Abdulmohsen Bin Abdulaziz International Airport =

Prince Abdulmohsen Bin Abdulaziz International Airport مطار الأمير عبدالمحسن بن عبدالعزيز الدولي
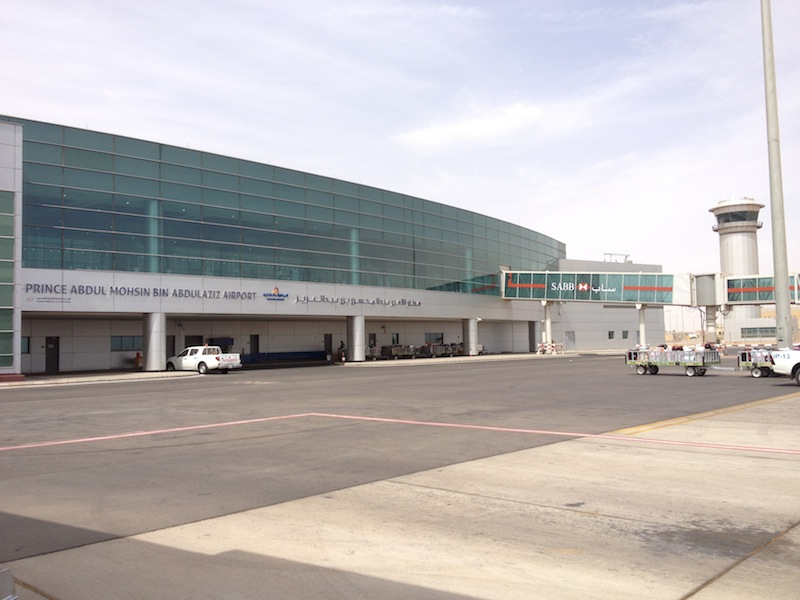
- IATA: YNB; ICAO: OEYN

Summary
- Airport type: Public
- Owner: General Authority of Civil Aviation
- Operator: General Authority of Civil Aviation
- Serves: Yanbu Governorate
- Location: Yanbu, Medina Province, Saudi Arabia
- Opened: 1979; 47 years ago
- Elevation AMSL: 26 ft / 8 m
- Coordinates: 24°08′39″N 38°03′48″E

Map
- Location of airport in Saudi Arabia

Runways
Direction	Length		Surface
Direction	ft	m	Surface
10/28	10,532	3,210	Asphalt

Prince Abdulmohsen Bin Abdulaziz International Airport, more commonly known as Yanbu Airport (IATA: YNB, ICAO: OEYN), is an airport located in Yanbu, in the Medina Province of western Saudi Arabia. The airport serves the Yanbu Governorate, offering both domestic and international flights. It is named in honor of Abdulmohsen bin Abdulaziz, the second governor of the Medina Province.

== History ==
The airport is named after Prince Abdulmohsen bin Abdulaziz, the second governor of Medina Province between 1965 and 1985.

A major expansion programme began in 2006, when a contract valued at SAR188 million was awarded to upgrade the airport’s facilities and construct a new passenger terminal. The General Authority of Civil Aviation opened the new terminal for traffic in November 2007.

The expanded airport was formally inaugurated by King Abdullah in July 2009. The upgrade introduced international-standard facilities, including two passenger airbridges—the first installed at a regional airport in Saudi Arabia.

International operations began on 24 December 2009, when AlMasria Universal Airlines launched flights to Cairo International Airport.

== Airlines and destinations ==
Domestic carriers Saudia, Flyadeal and Flynas only serve the domestic destinations listed below, while domestic carrier Nesma Airlines serves one international destination. All other international destinations are served by non-Saudi airlines.

Airlines	Destinations
Air Arabia	Cairo
Air Cairo	Alexandria, Sohag
AlMasria Universal Airlines	Cairo
flyadeal	Dammam
Flynas	Dammam
Nesma Airlines	Cairo
Nile Air	Alexandria, Cairo
Qatar Airways	Doha
Saudia	Jeddah, Riyadh
Turkish Airlines	Istanbul

== See also ==
- List of airports in Saudi Arabia
