= Neom Bay Airport =

Neom Bay Airport مطار خليج نيوم
- IATA: NUM; ICAO: OENN

Summary
- Airport type: Commercial
- Owner: Neom Company
- Serves: Neom
- Location: Neom Bay, Tabuk Province, Saudi Arabia
- Opened: 30 June 2022; 4 years ago
- Time zone: Saudi Arabia Standard Time (UTC+03:00)
- Coordinates: 27°55′30″N 35°17′24″E
- Website: Official website

Map
- Location of airport in Saudi Arabia NUM (Middle East) NUM (West and Central Asia) NUM (Asia) NUM (Afro-Eurasia)

Runways
| Direction | Length | | Surface |
| Direction | m | ft | Surface |
|---|---|---|---|
| 15/33 | 3,757 | 12,323 | Asphalt |

Neom Bay Airport (IATA: NUM, ICAO: OENN) is an international airport serving the developing city of Neom in Saudi Arabia.

== Background ==
The airport is located at Neom Bay, the first area to be constructed in the framework of the project. It is one of the four-airport network that is projected in the city, one of which is to be international. The International Air Transport Association (IATA) has classified the airport as a commercial hub. The length of the airport's runway is 3,757 metres (12,323 ft). The airport has a logistic location as it links three countries: Saudi Arabia, Jordan and Egypt. Neom Airport is the first airport in the region to use the 5G wireless network service. It is 48 km (30 mi) east from the nearest airport, Sharm El Sheikh International Airport across the Red Sea in Egypt.

== History ==
In January 2019, the airport received 130 Saudia passengers, who were employees in Neom; this was their first visit to the project. The airport received its first commercial flight on 30 June 2019, when a Saudia aircraft landed from Riyadh.

== Airlines and destinations ==
| Airlines | Destinations |
|---|---|
| flyadeal | Dammam |
| flydubai | Dubai–International |
| Nile Air | Cairo |
| Qatar Airways | Doha |
| Saudia | Cairo, Dammam, Dubai–International, Jeddah, Riyadh |

== See also ==
- List of airports in Saudi Arabia
- Red Sea International Airport
- Saudi Vision 2030
