= Najran Regional Airport =

Airport in Najran, Saudi Arabia

Najran Regional Airport مطار نجران الإقليمي
- IATA: EAM; ICAO: OENG

Summary
- Airport type: Public
- Owner: General Authority of Civil Aviation
- Serves: Najran Province
- Location: Najran, Saudi Arabia
- Opened: 1973; 53 years ago
- Elevation AMSL: 3,982 ft / 1,214 m
- Coordinates: 17°36′41″N 044°25′09″E

Map
- Location of airport in Saudi Arabia

Runways
Direction	Length		Surface
Direction	m	ft	Surface
06/24	3,050	10,007	Asphalt

Najran Regional Airport (IATA: EAM, ICAO: OENG) is an airport located in Najran, Saudi Arabia, that serves Najran Province.

== Airlines and destinations ==
Airlines	Destinations
Flyadeal	Dammam, Riyadh
Flydubai	Dubai–International
Flynas	Dammam, Jeddah, Riyadh
Saudia	Jeddah, Riyadh

== See also ==
- Transport in Saudi Arabia
- List of airports in Saudi Arabia
