= King Abdulaziz International Airport =

Large international airport in Jeddah, Saudi Arabia

- Airport logo, combining the IATA code (JED) with the Arabic name for Jeddah (جدة)

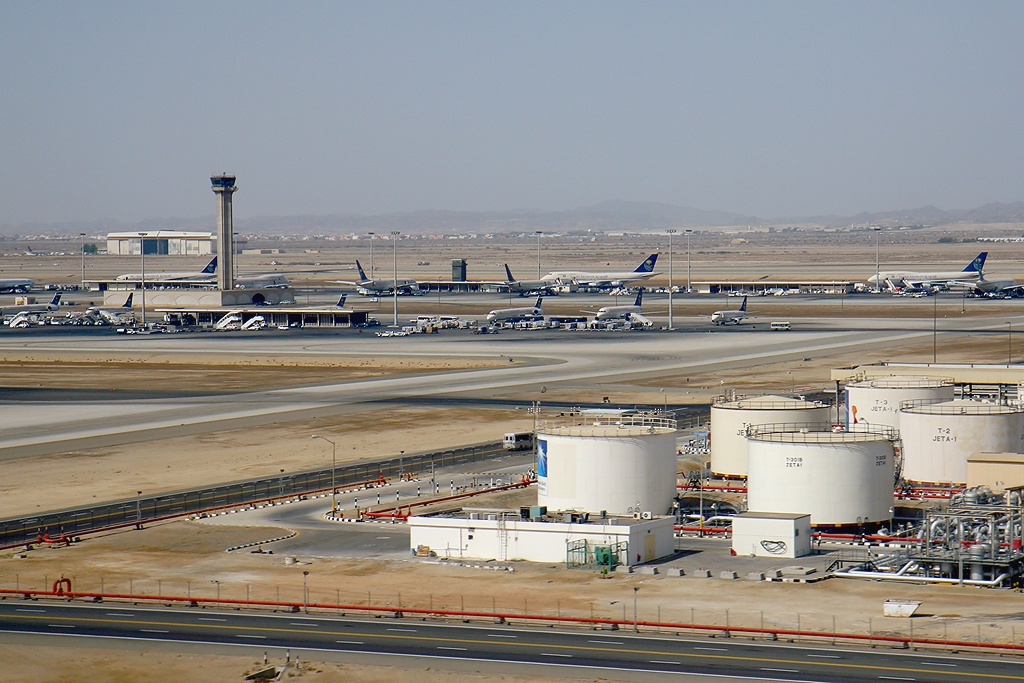
- IATA: JED; ICAO: OEJN

Summary
- Airport type: Public
- Owner/Operator: Jeddah Airports Company / Royal Saudi Air Force
- Serves: Jeddah and Mecca, Saudi Arabia
- Location: Jeddah, Saudi Arabia
- Opened: 31 May 1981; 45 years ago
- Hub for: flyadeal; Flynas; Saudia
- Elevation AMSL: 15 m (49 ft)
- Coordinates: 21°40′46″N 039°09′24″E
- Website: www.kaia.sa

Maps
- Location of airport in Saudi Arabia JED (Middle East) JED (Asia)
- Interactive map of King Abdulaziz International Airport

Runways
Direction	Length		Surface
Direction	m	ft	Surface
16L/34R	4,000	13,123	Asphalt
16C/34C	4,000	13,123	Concrete
16R/34L	3,800	12,467	Asphalt

Statistics (2023)
- Passengers: 53,400,000
- Traffic movement: 310,000
- Economic impact (2012): $11.5 billion
- Social impact (2012): 126,700

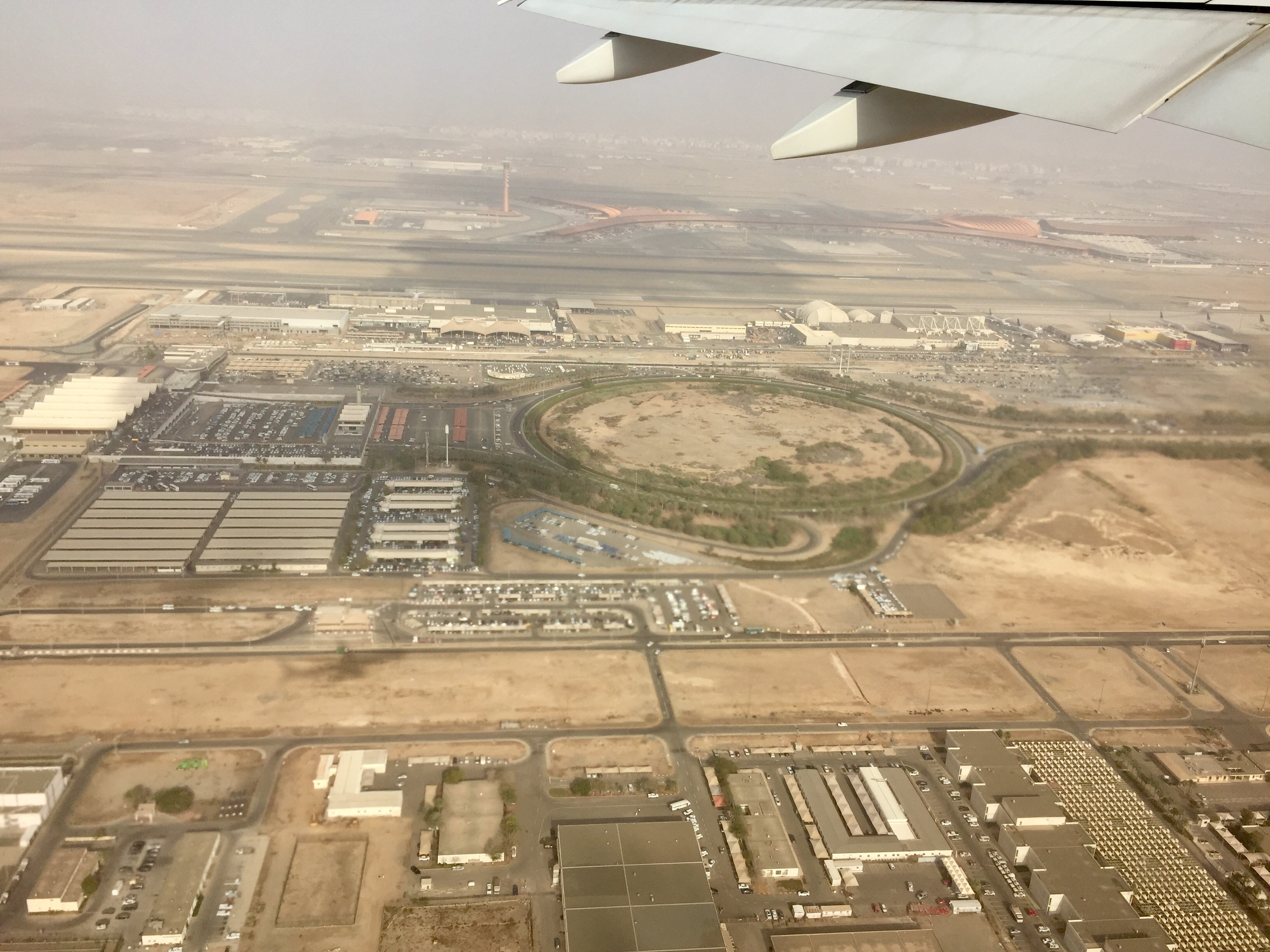
Aerial view with old South Terminal, the new Terminal 1 can be seen in the background

King Abdulaziz International Airport (Note: Arabic: مطار الملك عبدالعزيز الدولي) (IATA: JED, ICAO: OEJN; colloquially referred to as Jeddah Airport, Jeddah International Airport, or KAIA) is a major international airport serving the cities of Jeddah and Mecca in Saudi Arabia, located 19 kilometres (12 mi) north of Jeddah and covering an area of 112 square kilometres (43 sq mi). In terms of annual passenger count, the airport is consistently the busiest in Saudi Arabia and one of the busiest in the Middle East, owing partly to its unique role in the annual Hajj pilgrimage. Opened in 1981, it was built to replace the now-demolished Jeddah International Airport located in Al-Kandarah, and is named after the founder of Saudi Arabia, King Abdulaziz.

The airport shares its airfield with the RSAF King Abdullah Air Base, and has a royal terminal and three operational passenger terminals, including a Hajj Terminal built exclusively to handle increased traffic during the pilgrimage season. It serves as the largest hub for Saudia, the Saudi flag carrier, and as an operating base for national low-cost carriers Flynas and Flyadeal.

== History ==
=== Al-Kandara location ===
Before the construction of the King Abdulaziz International Airport, Jeddah and the surrounding region were served by the Jeddah International Airport (also called Kandara Airport) located in the southern part of the city. Following a meeting between King Abdulaziz and Franklin D. Roosevelt in 1945, the kingdom was gifted a Douglas DC-3 that was operated between the cities of Jeddah, Riyadh, and Dhahran. In 1946, Saudia, the Saudi flag carrier, was set up and operated out of the airport. The company began flying in Hajj pilgrims to the city, first from Lod in Mandatory Palestine, and later from other countries.

In 2022, DAA International, a company owned by the Irish state, won a contract to manage and operate the airport for five years.

=== Construction ===
Plans for a new airport located outside of Jeddah were first conceived in 1965 as a small project costing not more than US$20 million. In 1967, two proposals from two American companies were made, with the estimated cost significantly increasing to US$275 million. However, the project was shelved until 1974. As part of the government-launched Airports Development Program, in 1974, a new site was selected north of Jeddah and construction began in 1975. The airport at the time was dubbed new Jeddah International Airport (NJIA). German contractor Hochtief had won the bid, and the project was estimated to cost US$375 million.

In 1976, a total budget of US$8 billion was dedicated to civil aviation infrastructure in the government's 5-year plan. This funding was made to continue efforts which had previously started in the plan. Of the total budget, US$5 billion was specifically allocated for the construction of the new airport. The installation of runway and taxiway lighting fixtures was undertaken by Kirkpatrick. Construction work was finalized in 1980. A contract for the maintenance of the airport was awarded to Hochtief AG, and the cleaning contract of the airport was awarded to South Korean companies.

=== Opening ===
On 12 April 1981, King Khaled and Prince Fahd inaugurated the airport, naming it King Abdulaziz International Airport, which is named after the founder of the kingdom. Opening ceremonies of the airport were held. Notably, in an embarrassing incident, a Western consul spent five minutes accidentally referring to a bodyguard as "Your Royal Highness" before the crown prince actually arrived, unable to tell them alike. Following inauguration, the airport opened for service on 31 May, and the old Jeddah International Airport was demolished.

== Terminals ==
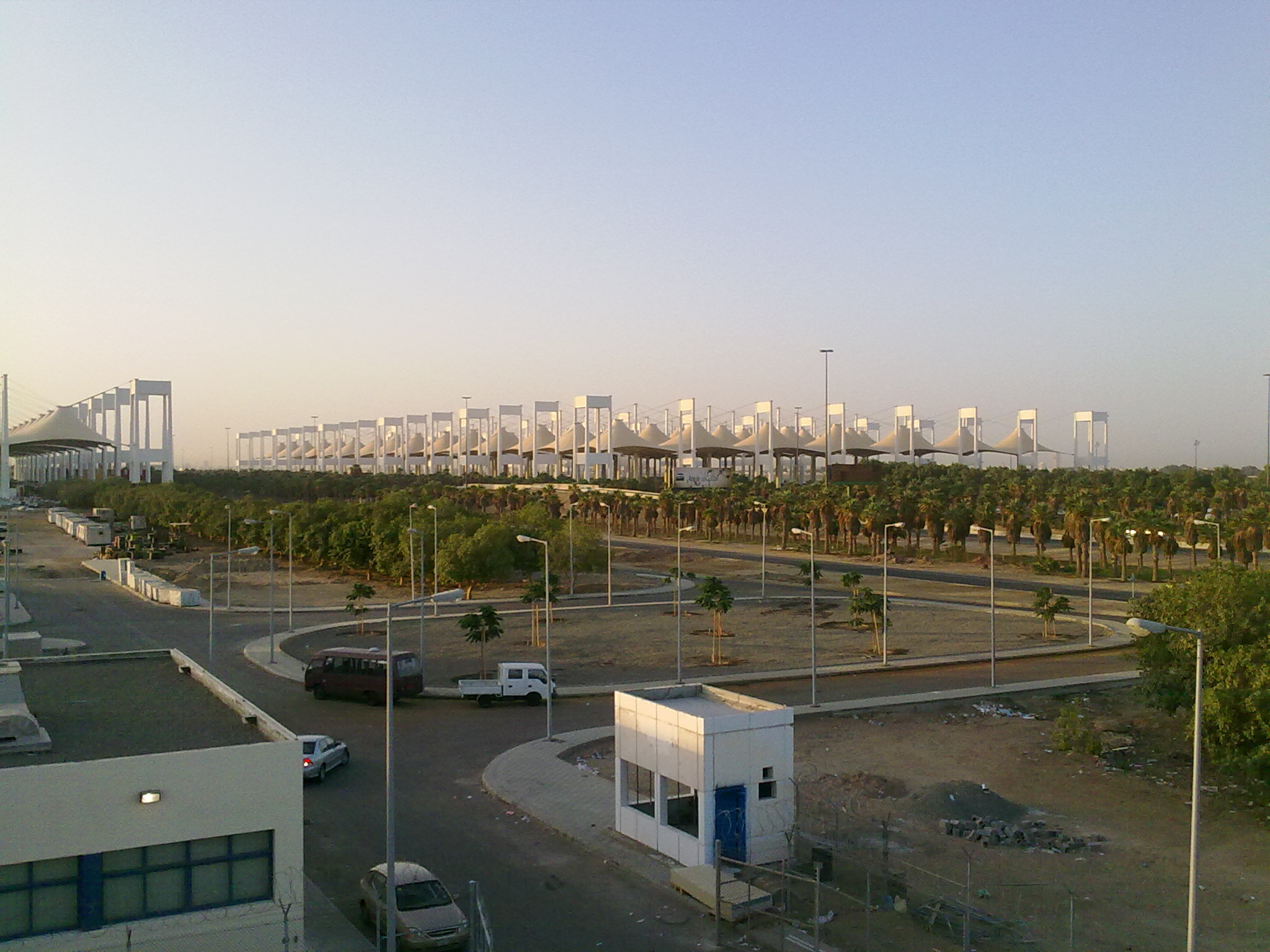
Hajj Terminal

South Terminal

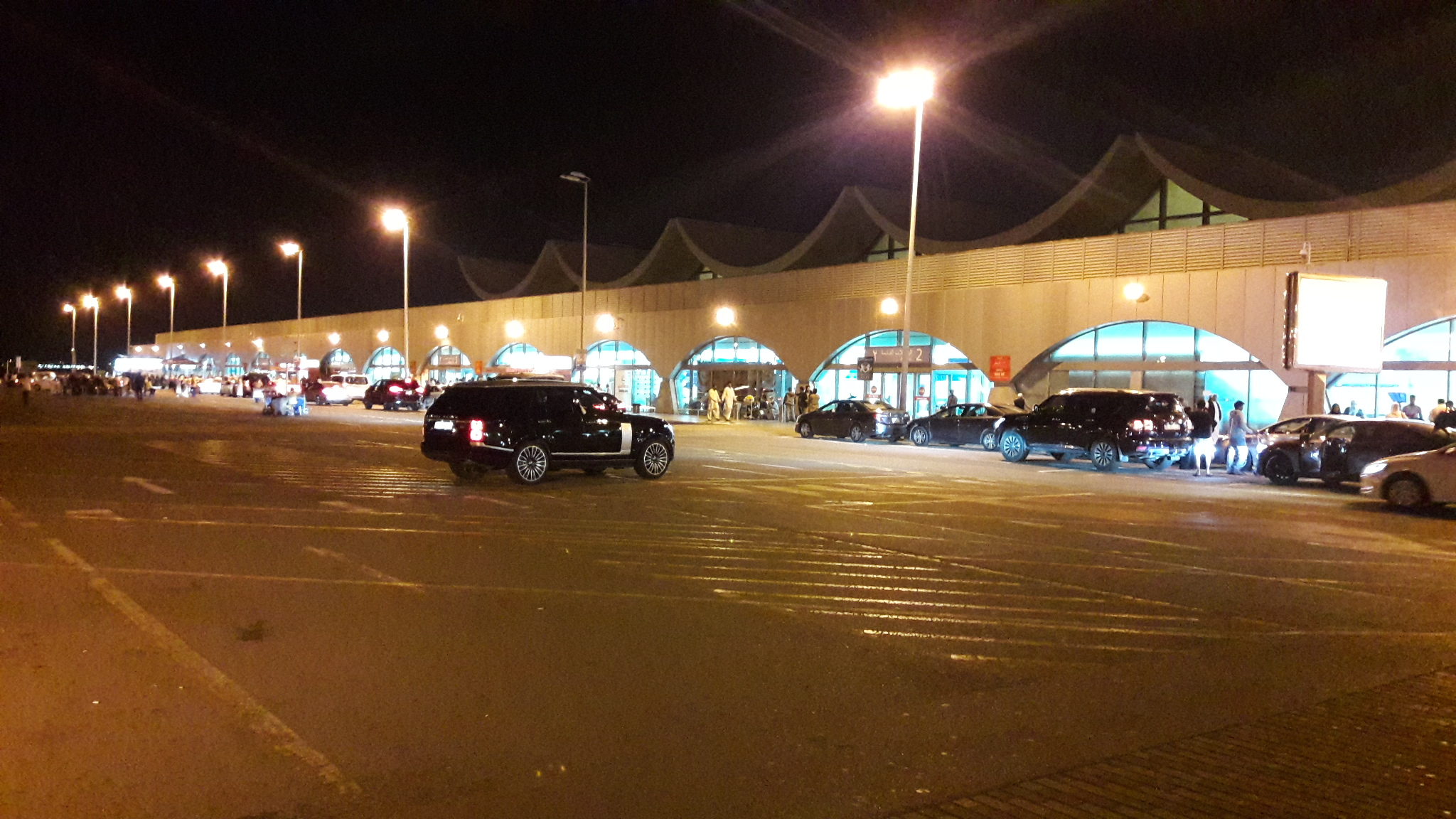
٘North Terminal

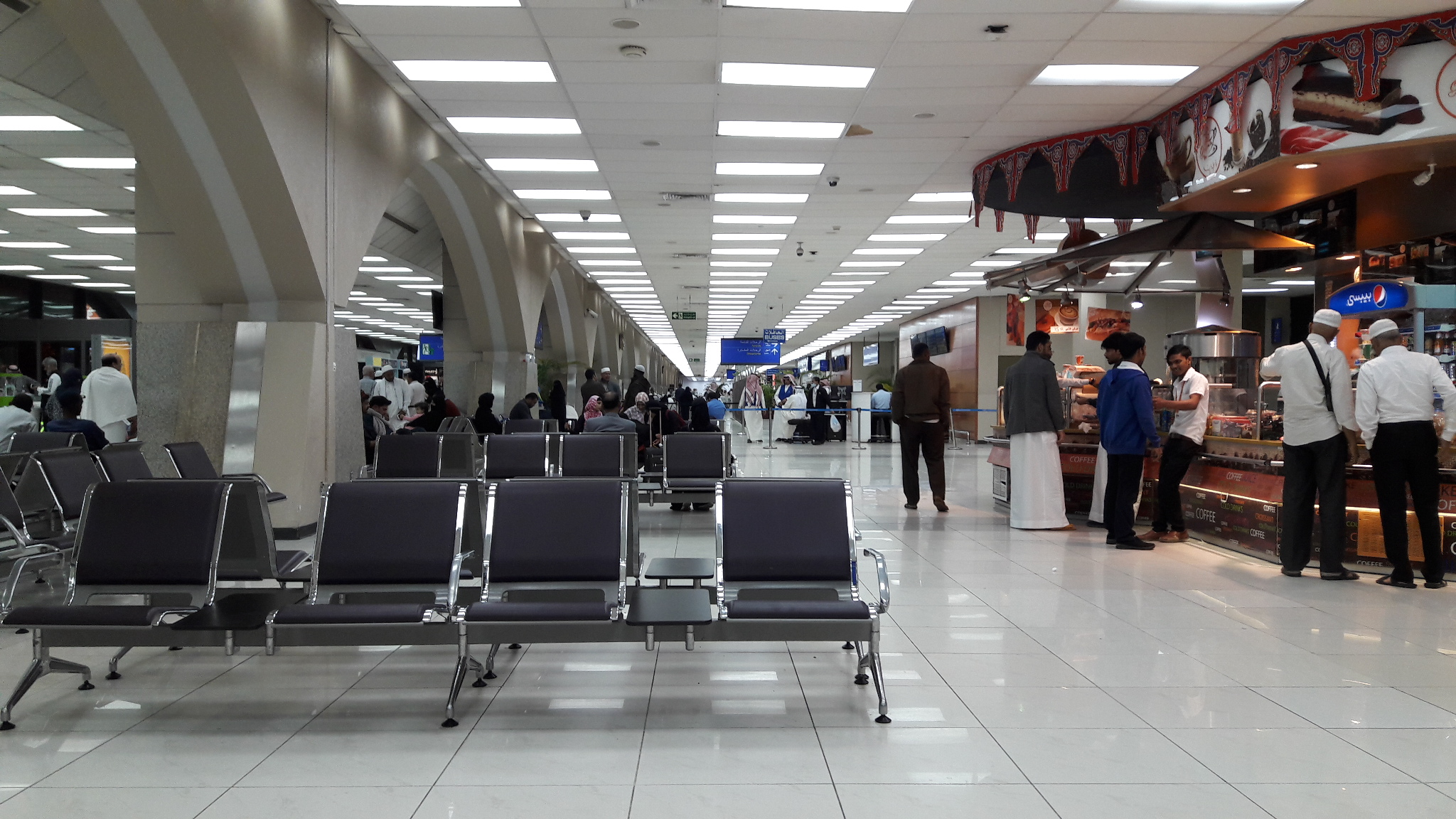
North Terminal interior

=== Terminal 1 ===
As part of the 2006 development project, a new passenger terminal was constructed. At 810,000 m^{2} (8,700,000 sq ft), it is one of the largest airport terminals in the world and can handle 30 million passengers annually. Still referred to as the New Terminal, it underwent a soft opening with a domestic flight landing from Gurayat in May 2018. In March 2019, all of Saudia's domestic operations were transferred to operate from the new terminal. In August 2019, Saudia started moving international operations to the new terminal, and in September of that year, the new terminal was officially named Terminal 1 and inaugurated by King Salman. On 18 November 2019, Etihad became the first non-Saudi airline to move to the new facility.

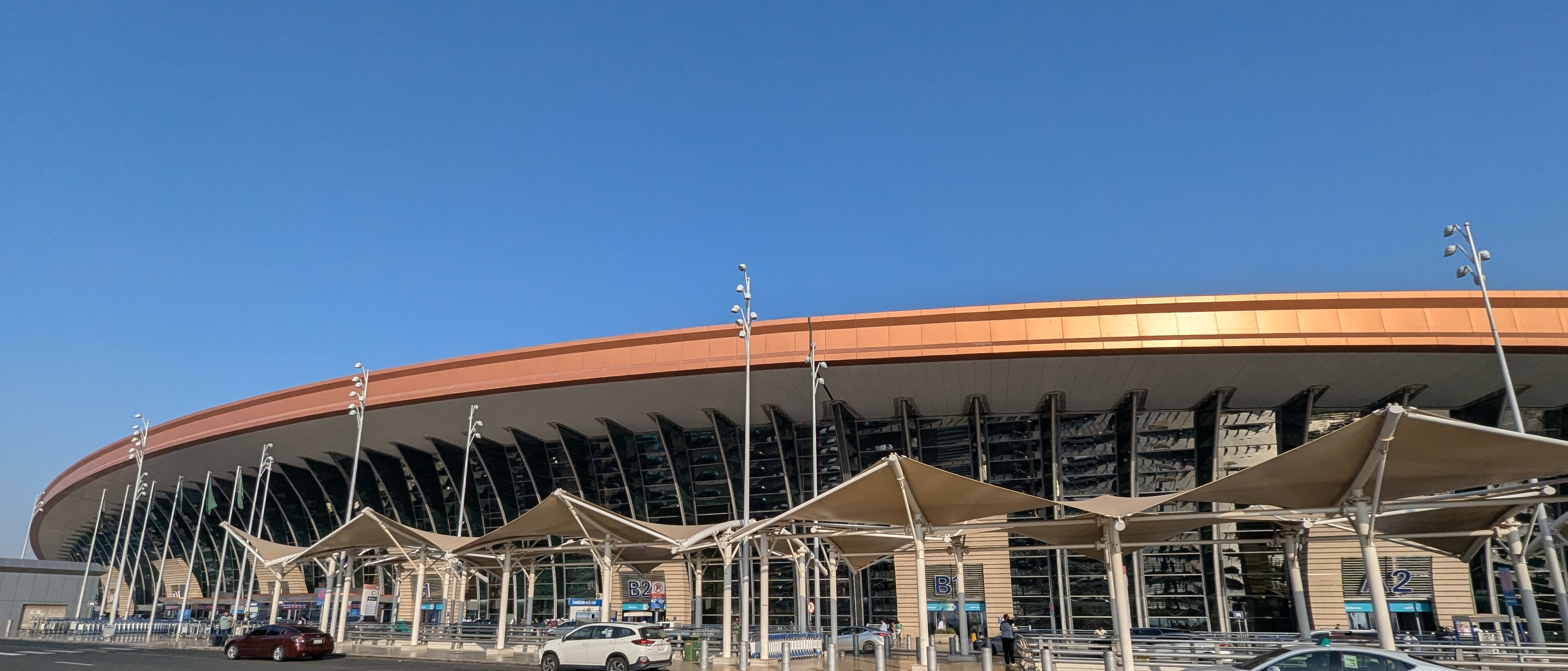
Terminal 1 outside view

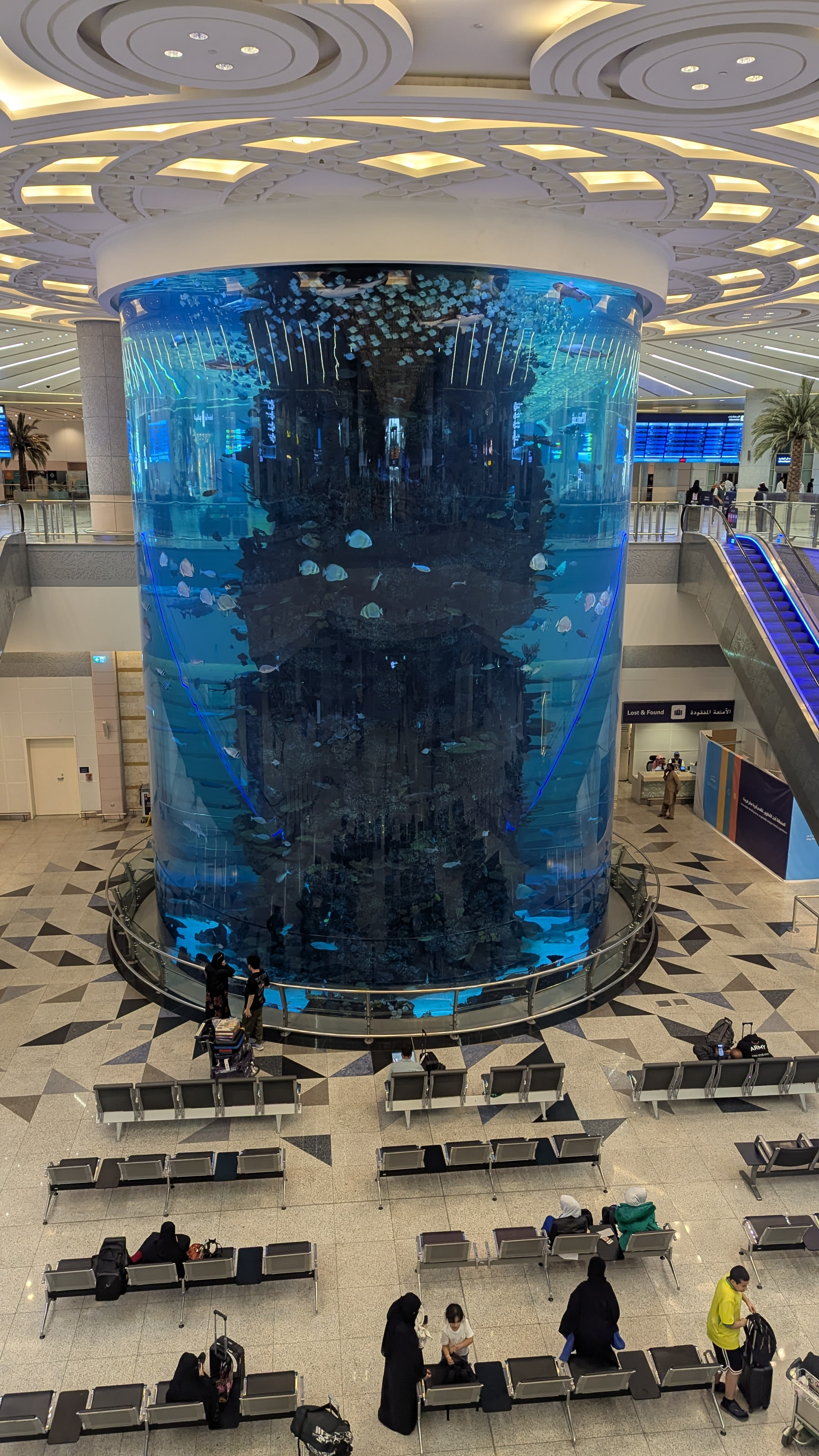
JED airport aquarium

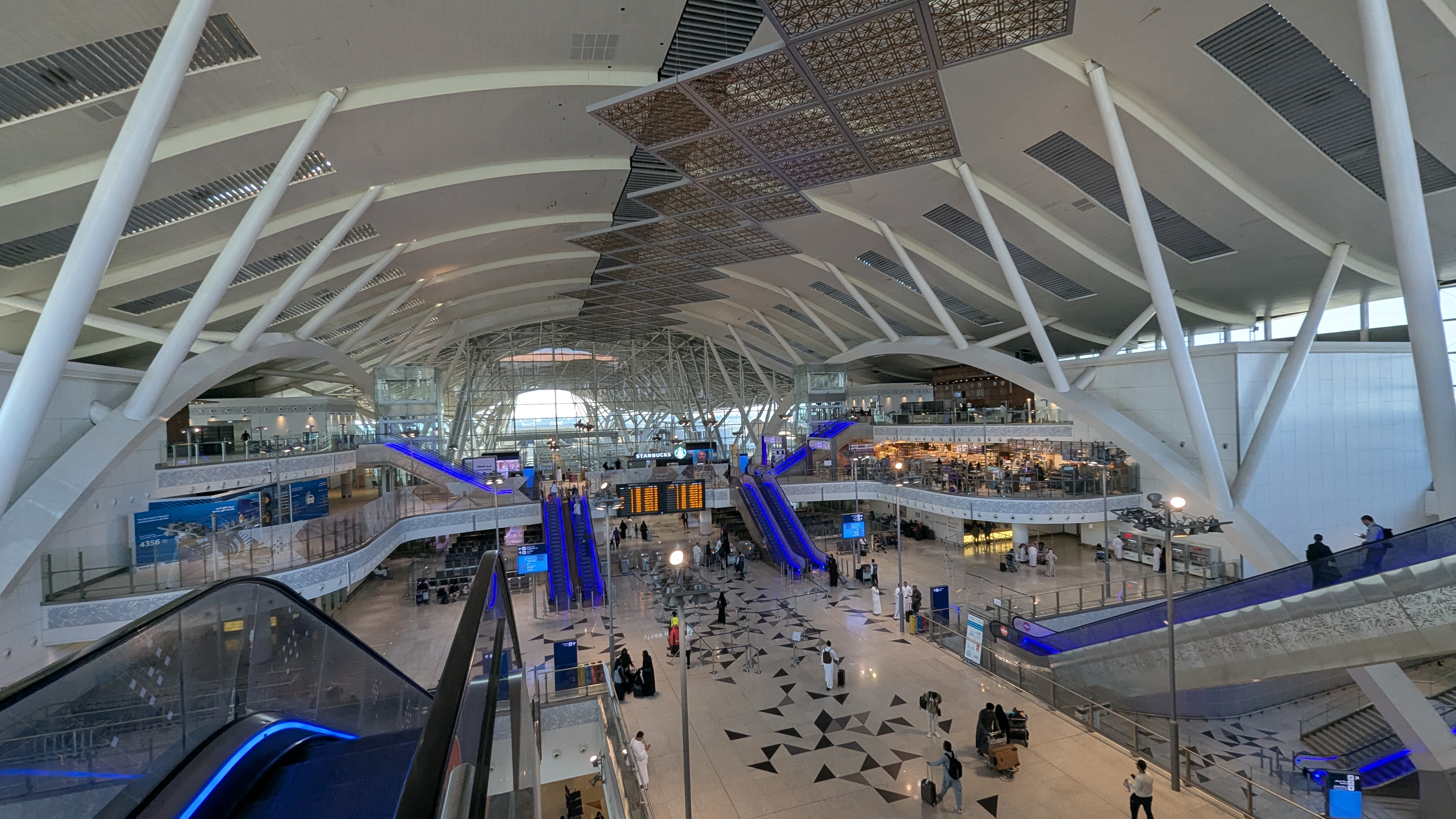
Jeddah Airport HHSR station inside view

Also a transport center that links the terminal building to the parking area and the Airport–Jeddah station of the Haramain High Speed Railway.

=== South Terminal ===
Opened in 1981, the South Terminal was one of the first passenger terminals at the airport, and was initially exclusively used by the national flag carrier, Saudia. The architectural design of the building was modeled on Dulles International Airport in the American capital, Washington, D.C., and incorporated tent-like structures. The terminal building consisted of separate departure and arrival lounges, and gates equipped with jet bridges. In 2007, Saudi low-cost carriers Flynas and Sama were also given permission to use the South Terminal, and later, permission to use the terminal was extended to the Indonesian flag carrier, Garuda Indonesia, and another Saudi low-cost airline, Flyadeal. After 40 years of service, on 26 June 2020, it was announced via the airport's official Twitter account that the South Terminal would be closed and its operations would be transferred to the newly built Terminal 1.

=== North Terminal ===
The North Terminal at King Abdulaziz International Airport is mainly used by non-Saudi airlines. It was originally planned to accommodate Hajj pilgrimage, however it was far too small and a site further north was selected.

=== Hajj Terminal ===
Because of Jeddah's proximity to the city of Mecca, the airport has a dedicated Hajj Terminal built to handle pilgrims taking part in the annual Islamic Hajj pilgrimage. The Hajj Terminal can accommodate 80,000 travelers at any given time. The terminal building was designed by Bangladeshi-American architect Fazlur Rahman Khan of Skidmore, Owings & Merrill, and is known for its tent-like roof structure, engineered by Horst Berger of Geiger Berger Associates. The roof is composed of ten modules, each consisting of twenty-one white tent-like Teflon-coated fiberglass structures suspended from pylons. The modules are grouped together into two blocks of five modules each, separated by a landscaped mall between the blocks.

Only customs, baggage handling and similar facilities are located in the air-conditioned building. The vast majority of the complex is a flexible, open area called the Terminal Support Area, which is conceived to function like a village, even consisting of a souk and mosque. Not enclosed by walls, this area is sheltered from the intense sun while allowing for natural ventilation; because of this, some consider it to be a green, environmentally-friendly building. The Hajj Terminal received the Aga Khan Award for Architecture in 1983.

=== Development projects ===
A development project for the airport started in 2006. The plan included the construction of Terminal 1 and the tallest air traffic control tower in the world at 136 metres (446 ft), airfield hard-standing and paved areas, lighting, fuel network systems, electronic passenger guidance systems and a new storm water drainage network. The development project also includes newly constructed support services building and upgrades to the existing runway and airfield systems.

In 2023, it was announced that a further expansion of the airport is planned. A fourth runway and a new Terminal 2 are to be built, while Terminal 1 will be expanded; this project was meant to be completed by 2031.

=== Other facilities ===
The General Authority of Civil Aviation maintains its presence at the Building 364, the GACA Hangar. An automated people mover (APM), constructed by Alstom, exists to move passengers between Terminal 1 and the North Terminal.

The Royal Saudi Air Force maintains its presence at the King Abdullah Air Base located towards the north of the airport. The Number 4, Number 16, and Number 20 squadrons of the 8th Wing of the RSAF, operating Lockheed C-130 Hercules aircraft, use it as their home base.

== Haramain High Speed Railway station ==
Terminal 1 is connected to the Haramain High Speed Railway mainline via a 3.75-kilometre (2.33 mi) branch line. The station at the airport terminal building was named Airport–Jeddah station to distinguish it from the Al-Sulimaniyah–Jeddah station situated closer to downtown Jeddah. It provides regular connections to the Islamic holy cities of Mecca and Medina, and to the King Abdullah Economic City.

Preceding station	Saudi Arabia Railways	Following station
King Abdullah Economic City towards Medina	Haramain High Speed Railway	Jeddah towards Mecca

== Runways ==
The airport is served by three parallel runways designated 16L/34R, 16C/34C, and 16R/34L.

== Airlines and destinations ==
=== Passenger ===
Airlines	Destinations
Aegean Airlines	Athens
Air Arabia	Alexandria, Assiut, Cairo, Luxor, Ras Al Khaimah, Sharjah
Ariana Afghan Airlines	Kabul; Seasonal: Herat, Mazar-i-Sharif
Air India Express	Bengaluru, Hyderabad, Kannur, Kozhikode, Lucknow, Mangaluru, Tiruchirappalli
Air Samarkand	Samarqand
Akasa Air	Ahmedabad, Bengaluru, Kochi, Kozhikode, Mumbai
Air Cairo	Cairo–Capital
azimuth	Makhachkala, Mineralnye Vody
Centrum Air	Tashkent
Citilink	Seasonal: Banda Aceh, Kediri
Egyptair	Alexandria, Cairo; Seasonal: Sharm El Sheikh
Emirates	Dubai–International
Ethiopian Airlines	Addis Ababa
Etihad Airways	Abu Dhabi; Seasonal: Al Ain
Eurowings	Berlin, Cologne/Bonn; Seasonal: Stuttgart
Flyadeal	Abha, Alexandria, Cairo, Damascus, Dammam, Gassim, Karachi, Sohag, Tabuk, Tashkent; Seasonal: Bergamo, Makassar, Prague
Flydubai	Dubai–International
Flynas	Abu Dhabi, Adana/Mersin, Addis Ababa, Aleppo, Almaty, Amman–City, Asmara, Assiut, Baku, Berlin, Bishkek, Brussels, Damascus, Dhaka, Djibouti, Doha, Dubai–Al Maktoum, Erbil, Entebbe, Giza, Hofuf, Istanbul–Sabiha Gökçen, Moscow-Vnukovo, Mumbai, Namangan, Osh, Pristina, Sohag, Tashkent, Yanbu; Seasonal: Batumi, Bodrum, El Alamein, Kozhikode, Rize–Artvin, Salzburg
Garuda Indonesia	Seasonal: Yogyakarta–International
Gulf Air	Bahrain
IndiGo	Ahmedabad, Bengaluru, Hyderabad, Kozhikode
Jazeera Airways	Seasonal charter: Nalchik
Kam Air	Kabul, Khost, Mazar-i-Sharif
Kuwait Airways	Kuwait City
Lion Air	Seasonal: Banda Aceh, Jakarta–Soekarno-Hatta, Yogyakarta–International
Malaysia Airlines	Kuala Lumpur–International; Seasonal: Penang
Pegasus Airlines	Istanbul–Sabiha Gökçen; Seasonal: Trabzon
Qanot Sharq	Bukhara, Fergana, Tashkent
Qatar Airways	Doha
Riyadh Air	Riyadh
SalamAir	Sohar
Saudia	Abha, Abu Dhabi, Al Baha, Alexandria, Al Jawf, Al Ula, Amman–Queen Alia, Amsterdam, Ankara, Arar, Baghdad, Bahrain, Bangkok–Suvarnabhumi, Barcelona, Beijing–Daxing, Bengaluru, Birmingham, Bisha, Cairo, Casablanca, Chennai, Dammam, Dawadmi, Delhi, Denpasar, Doha, Dubai–International, Frankfurt, Gassim, Geneva, Gurayat, Ha'il, Hyderabad, Istanbul, Jakarta–Soekarno-Hatta, Jizan, Kano, Kochi, Kozhikode, London–Gatwick, London–Heathrow, Lucknow, Madrid, Malè, Manchester, Manila, Mauritius, Medan, Milan–Malpensa, Multan, Mumbai, Munich, Nairobi–Jomo Kenyatta, Najran, Neom Bay, New York–JFK, Paris–Charles de Gaulle, Phuket, Qaisumah, Rafha, Red Sea, Riyadh, Rome–Fiumicino, Sharm El Sheikh, Sharurah, Singapore, Tabuk, Toronto–Pearson, Wadi al-Dawasir, Washington–Dulles, Zurich; Seasonal: Antalya, Athens, El Alamein, Heraklion, Hurghada, Los Angeles, Málaga, Venice, Vienna
Scoot	Singapore
Sudan Airways	Port Sudan
Somon Air	Dushanbe
SpiceJet	Delhi
Syrian Air	Aleppo, Damascus
Turkish Airlines	Istanbul
Wizz Air	Budapest, Milan–Malpensa, Rome–Fiumicino
Yemenia	Socotra

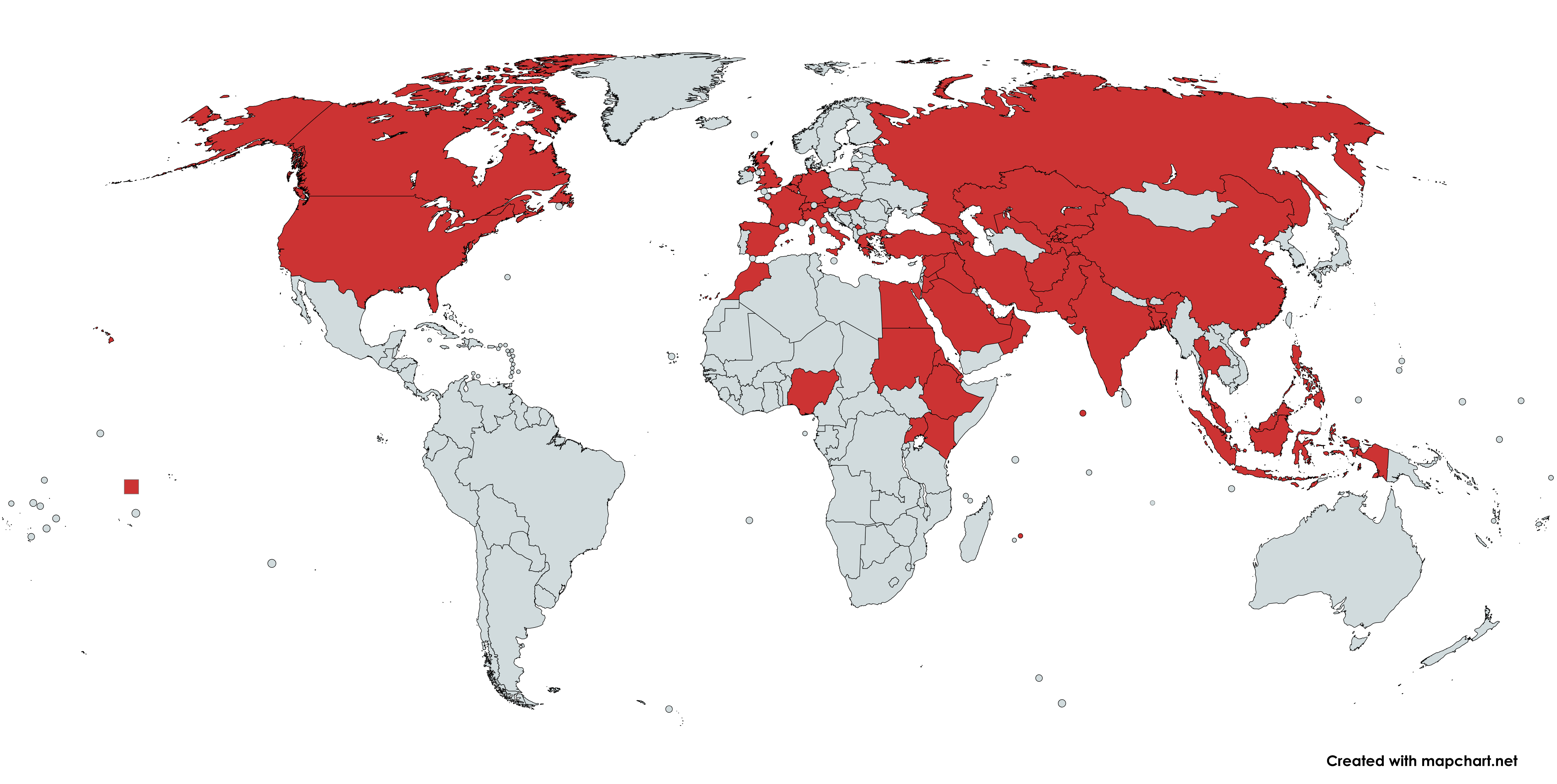
Destinations, as of Feb 2026.

=== Cargo ===
Airlines	Destinations
Ethiopian Airlines Cargo	Addis Ababa
My Freighter	Tashkent
Saudia Cargo	Bengaluru, New York–JFK,

== Accidents and incidents ==
- On 26 November 1979, Pakistan International Airlines Flight 740, a Boeing 707, crashed soon after takeoff when a fire started on board. There were no survivors among the 156 passengers and crew on board.
- On 6 February 1991, when the airport was being used as an air base during the Gulf War, a United States Air Force Boeing KC-135 Stratotanker suffered an accident when two of the KC-135's four engines ripped off and made an emergency landing at the base, two tires burst during the landing.
- On 11 July 1991, Nigeria Airways Flight 2120, a Douglas DC-8-61, suffered cabin pressure problems followed by a fire due to a failed landing gear. The pilots tried to return to the airport but failed to reach it and the plane crashed, killing all 247 passengers and 14 crew.
- On 1 March 2004, PIA Flight 2002, an Airbus A300B4-200, burst two tires whilst taking off. Fragments of the tire were ingested by the engines, causing the engines to catch fire and takeoff was aborted. Substantial damage to the engine and the left wing caused the aircraft to be written off. All 261 passengers and 12 crew survived.
- In July 2015, a Saudi Arabian Airlines plane was taxiing to the terminal when it crashed into an airport vehicle.

== See also ==
- List of airports in Saudi Arabia
- Haramain High Speed Railway
- List of things named after Saudi kings
- King Fahd International Airport
- List of the busiest airports in the Middle East
- List of airports with triple takeoff/landing capability
