= Wadi al-Dawasir Domestic Airport =

Wadi al-Dawasir Domestic Airport مطار وادي الدواسر المحلي
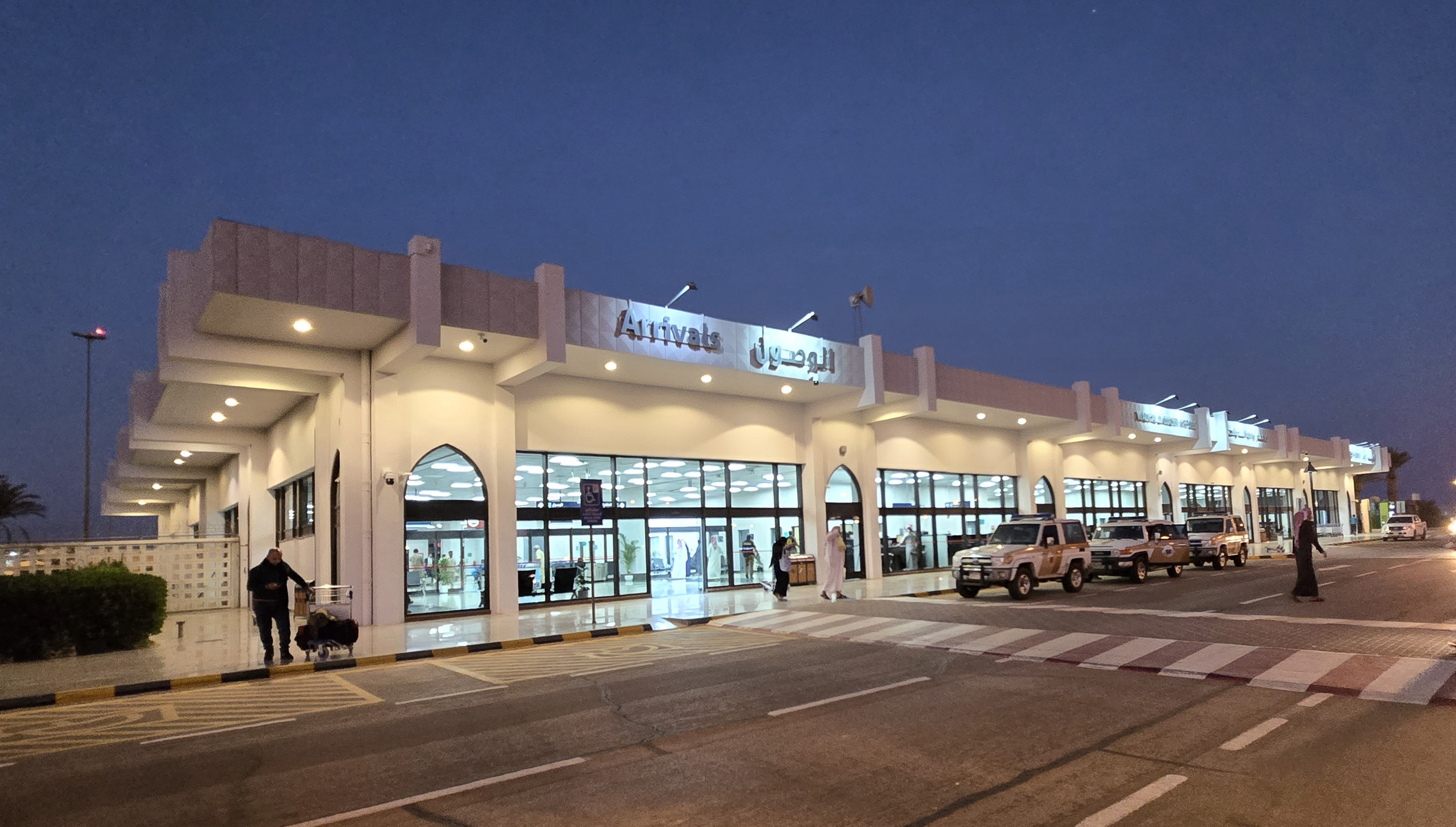
- IATA: WAE; ICAO: OEWD

Summary
- Airport type: Public
- Operator: Government
- Serves: Wadi al-Dawasir (Wadi ad-Dawasir)
- Location: Riyadh Province, Saudi Arabia
- Elevation AMSL: 2,062 ft (628 m)
- Coordinates: 20°30′15″N 045°11′58″E

Map
- Location of airport in Saudi Arabia

Runways
Direction	Length		Surface
Direction	m	ft	Surface
10/28	3,050	10,007	Asphalt

Wadi al-Dawasir Domestic Airport (Arabic: مطار وادي الدواسر المحلي, IATA: WAE, ICAO: OEWD) is an airport serving Wadi al-Dawasir (also spelled Wadi ad-Dawasir), a town in Riyadh Province, Saudi Arabia. The airport was established in 1990.

== Facilities ==
The airport resides at an elevation of 2,062 feet (628 m) above mean sea level. It has one runway designated 10/28 with an asphalt surface measuring 3,050 by 45 metres (10,007 ft × 148 ft).

== Airlines and destinations ==
Airlines offering scheduled passenger service:

Airlines	Destinations
Flynas	Abha, Riyadh
Saudia	Jeddah, Riyadh

== See also ==
- List of airports in Saudi Arabia
