= Gurayat Domestic Airport =

Gurayat Domestic Airport مطار القريات المحلي
- IATA: URY; ICAO: OEGT

Summary
- Airport type: Public
- Operator: Government
- Serves: Gurayat (Guriat)
- Location: Al Jawf Province, Saudi Arabia
- Elevation AMSL: 1,672 ft (510 m)
- Coordinates: 31°24′42″N 037°16′46″E

Map
- Location of airport in Saudi Arabia

Runways
Direction	Length		Surface
Direction	m	ft	Surface
10/28	3,050	10,007	Asphalt

Gurayat Domestic Airport (Arabic: مطار القريات المحلي, IATA: URY, ICAO: OEGT) is an airport serving Gurayat (also spelled Guriat or Qurayyat), a city in Al Jawf Province, Saudi Arabia. It provides facilities for Saudia scheduled services to both Jeddah and Riyadh. The airport was established in 1974.

== Facilities ==
The airport resides at an elevation of 1,672 feet (510 m) above mean sea level. It has one runway designated 10/28 with an asphalt surface measuring 3,050 by 45 metres (10,007 ft × 148 ft).

== Airlines and destinations ==
Airlines offering scheduled passenger service:

Airlines	Destinations
Flyadeal	Riyadh
Saudia	Jeddah, Riyadh

== See also ==
- List of airports in Saudi Arabia
- Saudia
