= Assiut Airport =

- IATA: ATZ; ICAO: HEAT

Summary
- Airport type: Public
- Operator: Government
- Serves: Assiut (or Asyut), Egypt
- Opened: 1974
- Elevation AMSL: 772 ft (235 m)
- Coordinates: 27°02′47″N 31°00′43″E

Map
- Location of airport in Egypt

Runways
Direction	Length		Surface
Direction	m	ft	Surface
13/31	3,019	9,905	Asphalt
- Source: DAFIF

Assiut Airport (Arabic: مطار أسيوط) (IATA: ATZ, ICAO: HEAT) is an airport in Assiut (or Asyut), Egypt. The airport started operating in 1974.

== Airlines and destinations ==
Airlines	Destinations
Air Arabia	Seasonal: Abu Dhabi
Air Cairo	Abha, Al Jawf, Amman–Civil, Dammam, Gassim, Jeddah, Kuwait City, Medina, Riyadh, Tabuk; Seasonal: Sharjah
Egyptair	Cairo
Flynas	Jeddah, Riyadh
Jazeera Airways	Kuwait City

== See also ==
- List of airports in Egypt
- New Nasser City
