= King Khalid International Airport =

International airport serving Riyadh, Saudi Arabia

King Khalid International Airport Maṭār al-Malik Khālid al-Duwaliyy

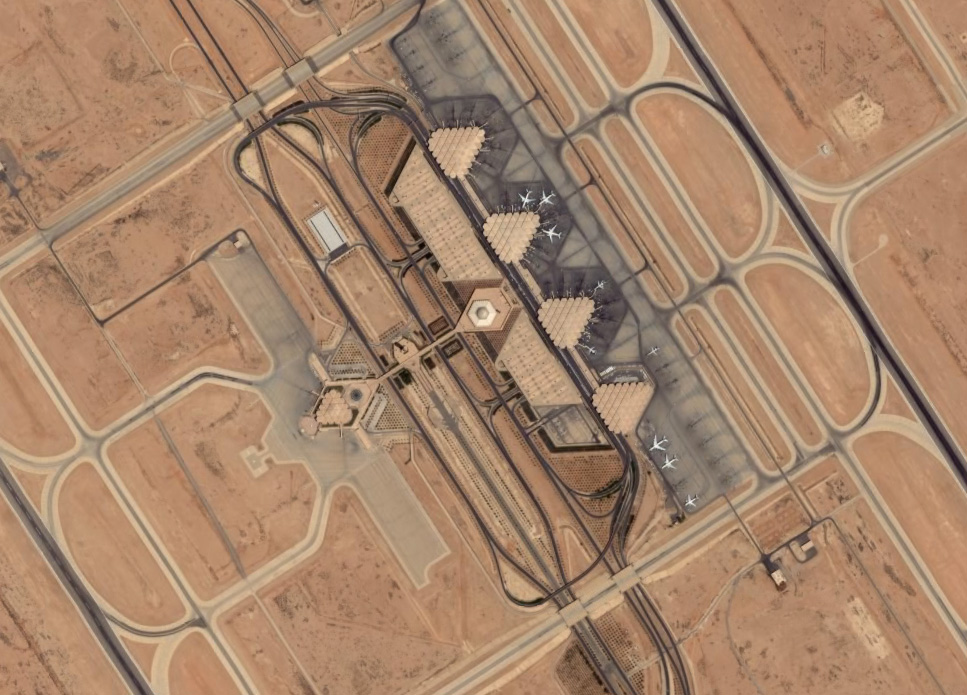
- Satellite image of the airport
- IATA: RUH; ICAO: OERK

Summary
- Airport type: Public
- Owner/Operator: Riyadh Airports Company
- Serves: Riyadh
- Location: Riyadh, Saudi Arabia
- Opened: 16 November 1983; 43 years ago
- Hub for: Flynas; Flyadeal; Riyadh Air; Saudia
- Elevation AMSL: 2,049 ft (625 m)
- Coordinates: 24°57′28″N 046°41′56″E
- Website: kkia.sa

Maps
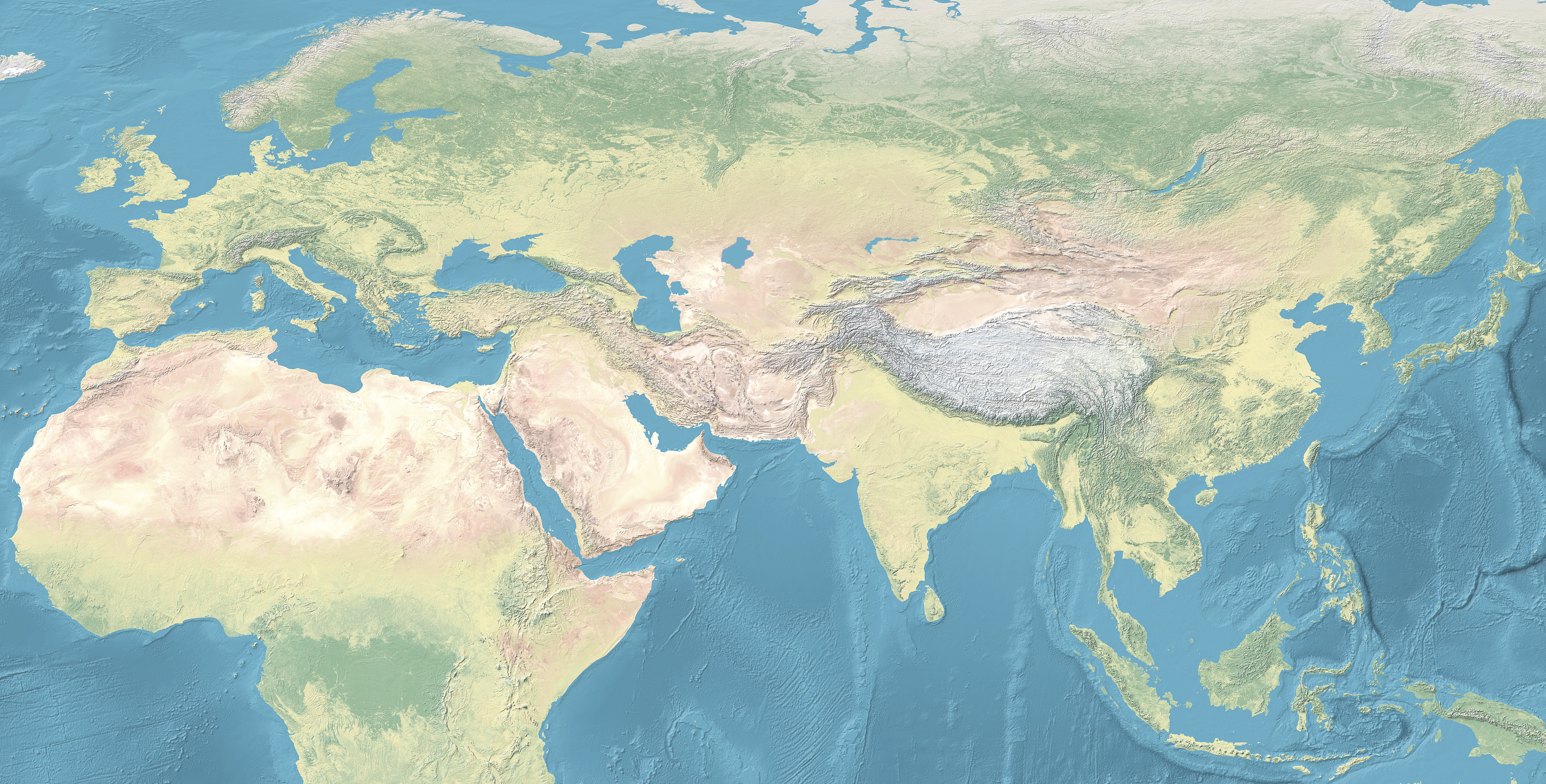
- Location of airport in Saudi Arabia RUH (Middle East) RUH (West and Central Asia) RUH (Asia) RUH (Eurasia) RUH (Afro-Eurasia)
- Interactive map of King Khalid International Airport

Runways
Direction	Length		Surface
Direction	m	ft	Surface
15R/33L	4,205	13,796	Asphalt
15L/33R	4,205	13,796	Asphalt

Statistics (2025)
- Passengers: 40.8 million
- Aircraft movements: 296.8 thousand
- Economic impact (2012): $8.0 billion
- Social impact (2012): 87.1 thousand
- Sources: AIP Saudi Arabia

King Khalid International Airport (Arabic: مطار الملك خالد الدولي, romanized: Maṭār al-Malik Khālid al-Duwaliyy; IATA: RUH, ICAO: OERK) is an international airport located about 35 kilometres (22 mi) north of Riyadh, Saudi Arabia. This airport consists of four passenger terminals with eight aero-bridges each, a mosque, and parking facilities for 11,600 vehicles. It includes a "Royal Terminal" designated for use by government officials, state guests, and the Saudi royal family. The airport has one of the world's tallest air traffic control towers, and two parallel runways, each 4,260 metres (13,980 ft) in length. It is one of the busiest airports in the Middle East. The airport is owned and operated by the state-owned Riyadh Airports Company.

The Royal Mosque was designed with a significant programme of integral art; the stained glass, by British architectural artist Brian Clarke, was a landmark work in the history of the medium, considered to be the largest and technically most advanced stained glass project of the modern period.

== History ==
Initially, the city and region was served by Riyadh International Airport. However, by the 1970s, the pre-existing airport was operating at maximum capacity and was surrounded by growing neighborhoods that hindered infrastructure expansion. In 1974, the planning and site selection of a replacement airport for the old airport began as part of the Airports Development Program. In 1976, construction of King Khalid International Airport (KKIA) began. It was designed by architectural practice Hellmuth, Obata & Kassabaum, was opened by HRH King Fahd on 16 November 1983, and opened for scheduled flights on 5 December of the same year. Until then, what is now Riyadh Air Base served commercial flights to and from Riyadh. Increased international and local air transport requirements for Riyadh made the change necessary. In 2021, Riyadh Air Base was shut down and is being redeveloped into King Salman Park.

This airport was an alternative landing site for NASA's Space Shuttle.

On 27 July 2010 at 11:38 local time, Lufthansa Cargo Flight 8460, an MD-11 registered D-ALCQ, crashed upon landing at the airport and was damaged beyond repair in the ensuing fire. The pilot in command and the first officer – the only two persons on board – were injured.

On 12 March 2023, the Crown Prince of Saudi Arabia, Mohammed bin Salman, formally announced the establishment of Riyadh Air. Riyadh Air uses the airport as a hub.

Between 6 and 12 October 2026, the Houthis carried out a series of strikes on the airport, killing 18 people and injuring over 300 others. During the attacks, a Saudia Airbus A320 was also destroyed. Airport operations were suspended from 10 October to 25 October; after the partial reopening, the Houthis continued missile and drone attacks on the airport, which the Saudis intercepted. Some airlines such as Air France and KLM elected to extend their flight suspensions to Riyadh after the airport's reopening.

== Structure and facilities ==
=== Terminals ===
==== Passenger terminals ====
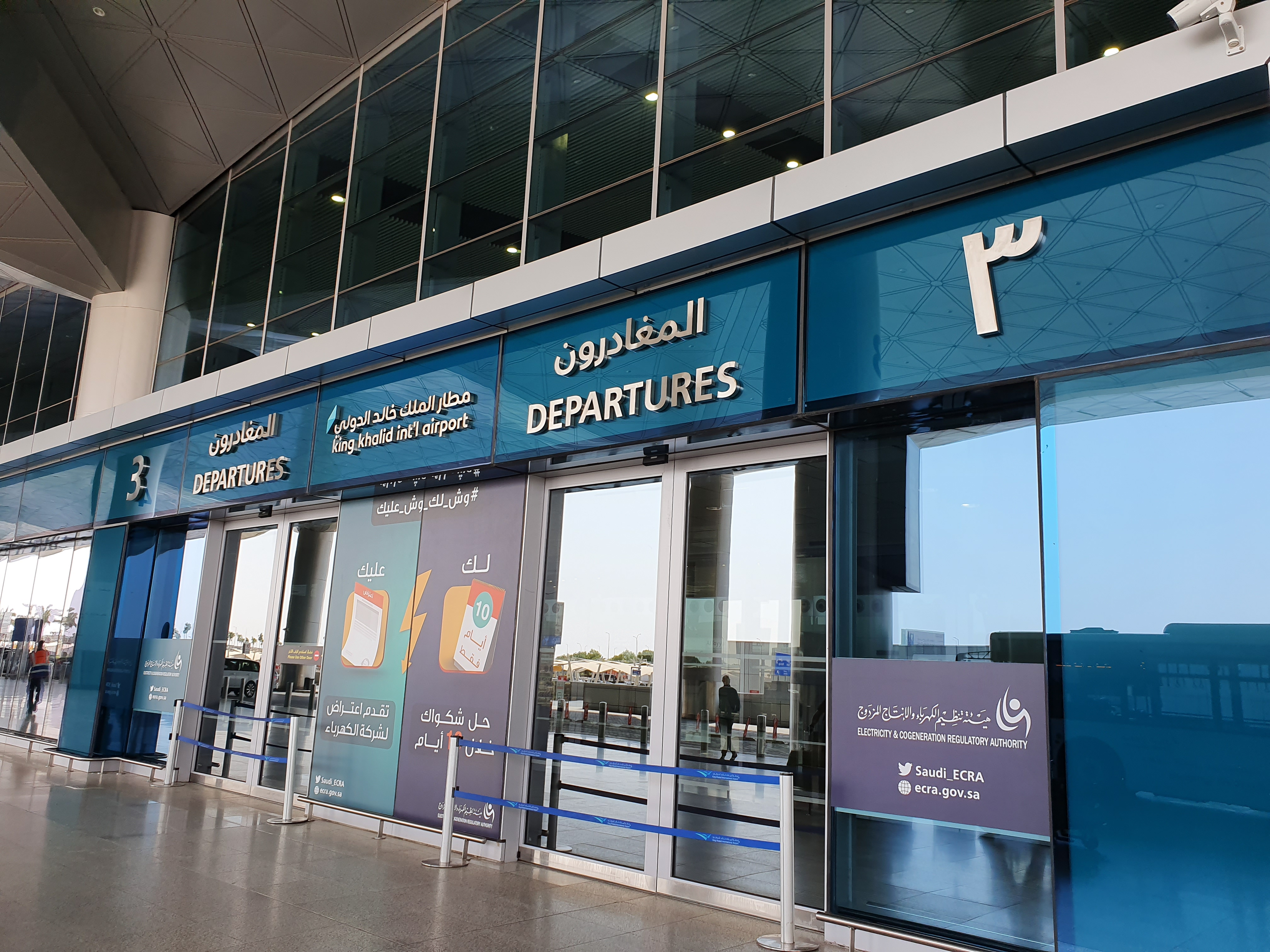
Domestic Departure gate

There are five main passenger terminals at the airport; four of them were built when the airport started operations in 1983, and Terminal 5 was opened in 2016.

- Terminal 1 is used for international flights operated by Saudi Arabian Low Cost Carriers Flynas and Flyadeal.
- Terminal 2 is used for international flights of Saudia and Riyadh Air.
- Terminal 3 now hosts domestic flights of Flynas, Flyadeal and Riyadh Air. It also hosted shuttle flights to Doha during the 2022 FIFA World Cup.
- Terminal 4 is used exclusively by Saudia for domestic flights.
- Terminal 5 is the newest terminal which opened in 2016, which is used by all foreign carriers for international flights.

Terminals 1 to 4 were built when the airport was opened in November 1983. They are connected to each other by means of three linking buildings, each 168 metres (551 ft 2 in) long. Each terminal is triangular in plan, with a base area of 47,500 square metres (511,000 sq ft). The complex includes a modern VIPs terminal plus restaurants, cafeterias, airlines offices, government departments, hotels and rent-a-car companies counters, banks, first aid clinics and commercial shops.

Terminal 5 is a 106,500 square metres (1,146,000 sq ft) rectangular building which can serve 16 narrow-body or 8 wide-body aircraft. Operated by Irish airport operator Dublin Airport Authority, it is Saudi's first privately run airport terminal and can handle 12 million passengers per year.

==== The Royal Terminal ====
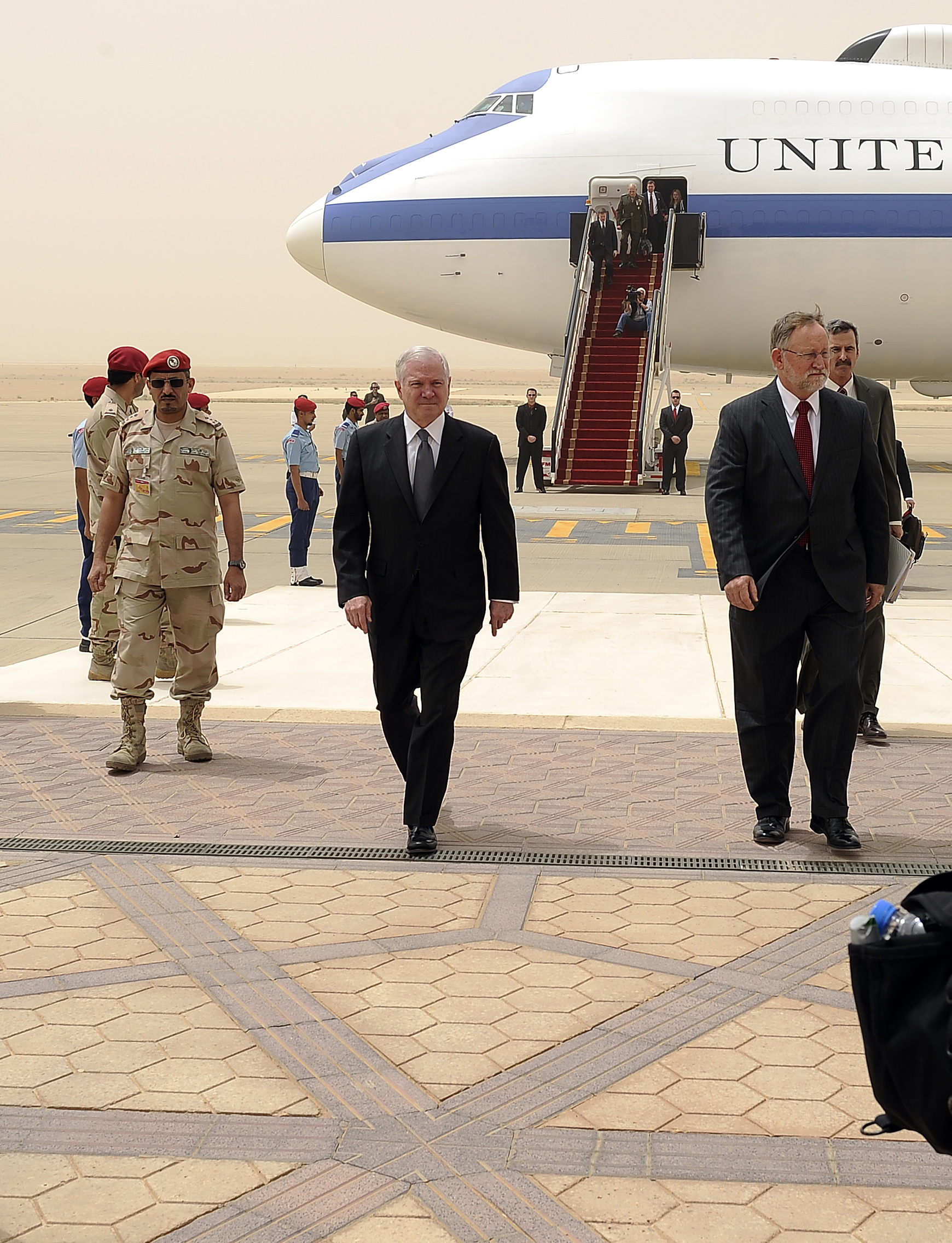
The US Secretary of Defense Robert Gates walks with U.S. Ambassador to Saudi Arabia James Smith after arriving at King Khalid International Airport.

Heads of state and other high-ranking VIP visitors to the kingdom are greeted in the Royal Pavilion. The Royal Pavilion has open spaces, garden areas, and fountains. A ceremonial hall 12.5 metres (41 ft 0 in) wide and 390 metres (1,279 ft 6 in) long connects it to the mosque. The design and geometry of the building are similar to those of the other terminals architecturally and in the aesthetic respect. Arriving guests can use either air bridges or escalators to enter the building from the aircraft parking area. The ceremonial area on the airside has space for special receptions involving honor guards and bands. Like the passenger terminals, the Royal Pavilion has a triangular plan, with a roof composed of 33 arched sections rising to a high point 30 metres (98 ft 5 in) above the ground level. Glass walls and windows illuminate the interior of the building.

==== General aviation terminal ====
A general aviation complex has been constructed north of runway number 1 for use by private aircraft and is reached by a special access road which runs north from the airport access highway. The general aviation facility includes a passenger terminal, aircraft parking and maintenance facilities, taxiways and parking for visitors, tenants and staff. In addition to privately owned aircraft, this facility accommodates Saudia's special flight services group. It is also home to Alsalam Aircraft Company, Ltd. Programmed Depot Maintenance (PDM) on Royal Saudi Air Force aircraft is performed at the uniquely designed facility.

=== Expansion ===
In July 2014, German construction company Hochtief won the bid for the airport expansion which aims at increasing its capacity from 15 million to 25 million and includes construction of a new fifth terminal. The contract was valued at €1.3 billion and was carried out by Hochtief with a 55% stake, along with Indian engineering company Shapoorji Pallonji Mideast and Saudi Arabian construction company Nahdat Al Emaar. Renovation of Terminals 3 and 4 was completed in May 2019.Terminal 5 was partially inaugurated on 23 May 2016.

==== King Salman International Airport ====
King Salman International Airport is a proposed new airport to be built over King Khalid International Airport. The new airport will have no fewer than six parallel runways and capacity for up to 100 million passengers annually.

=== The Royal Mosque ===
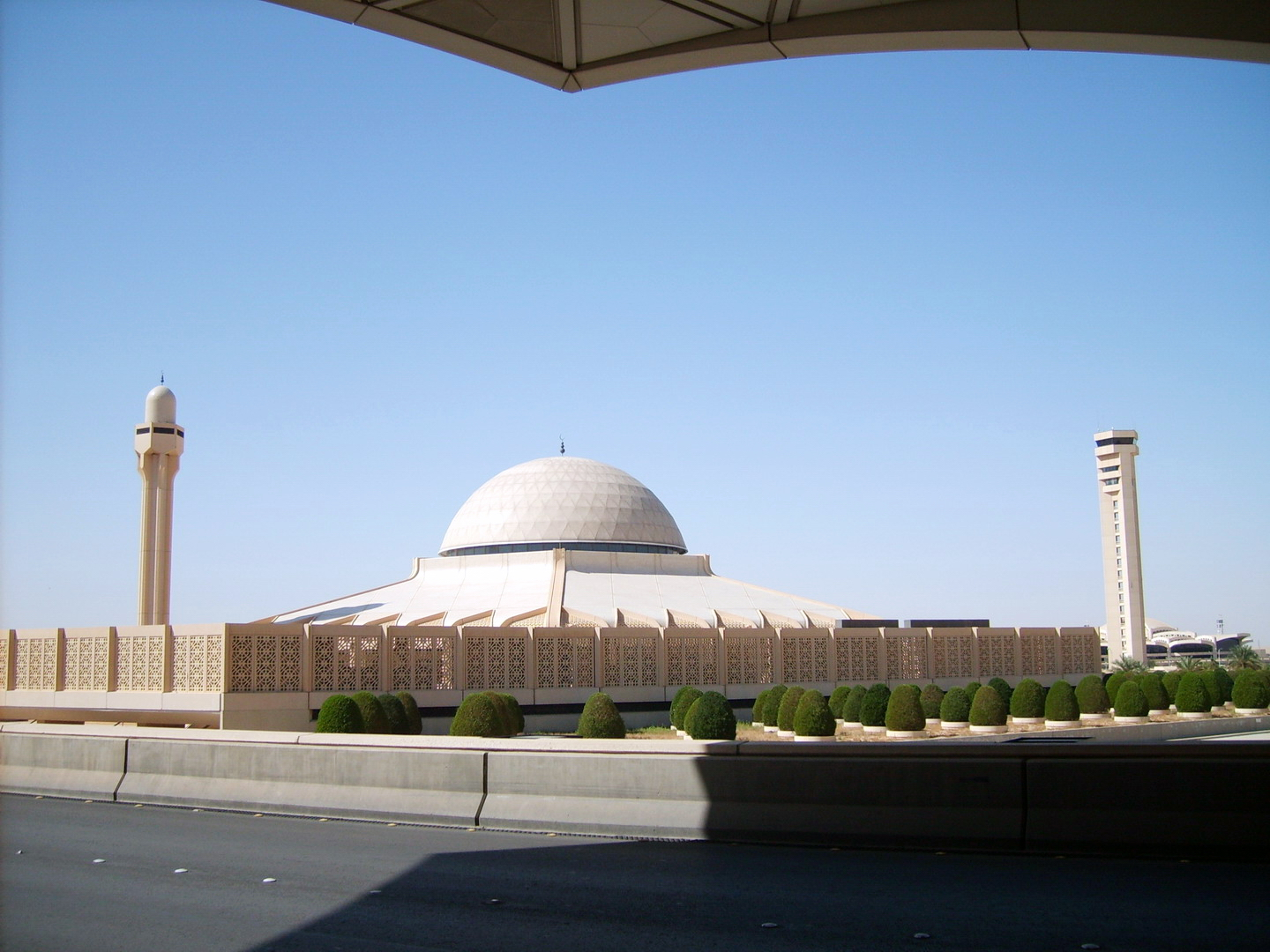
King Khalid Airport Mosque in Riyadh

The Royal Mosque is set within a plaza in a central position in the airport. KKIA was the first airport in Saudi Arabia to be built to then-contemporary engineering standards and the mosque was at the time of its construction the most modern in the world. It used advances in construction and engineering to create a modern complex in a vernacular Arabic style. Hexagonal in plan, and enclosing an area of over 60,000 sq ft (5,600 m^{2}), its scale, location and design make it the dominant building in the passenger complex. The mosque can accommodate 5,000 worshippers inside and 4,000 in the surrounding plaza. The mosque's dome, 33 metres (108 ft 3 in) in diameter and internally clad in polished bronze, rises 40 metres (131 ft 3 in) above the arrivals level roadway, higher than all the other structures in the passenger complex except the control tower and the mosque's minaret. The minaret, rises 39 metres (127 ft 11 in) above the northeast corner of the mosque plaza. A spiral stairway in the minaret provides access to loudspeakers that broadcast the prayer calls five times daily. There are 5,030 square metres (54,100 sq ft) of floor space on the main floor of the mosque and another 765 square metres (8,230 sq ft) on the mezzanine floor. A Islamic library off the main mosque floor has 50 square metres (540 sq ft) of user space and the same amount for storage space. The library, private offices and lavatories are located along the southeast on the southwest walls.

==== Art ====
The mosque's decorative and integral art constituted one of the largest art projects of its day. It marries traditional Islamic decorative elements with the work of contemporary artists.

Separating the bronze dome from the lower part of the main building is a seven-foot (2.1 m) clerestory ring of stained-glass windows, considered to be the largest and technically most advanced stained-glass project of the modern period. The British architectural artist Brian Clarke was commissioned to design the windows through the Vesti Corporation. Clarke studied Islamic ornaments at the Quran schools in Fez and Tangier for six weeks, and produced a series of abstract designs that reflected historical pan-Islamic decorative tradition. Completed in 1982 and containing 2,000 square metres (22,000 sq ft) of stained glass, it required the full staff of four stained-glass factories and 150 craftsmen, taking a year to fabricate. The technical demands of the designs required the revival of certain traditional manufacturing techniques, the development of new ones to accommodate ornate geometric leading, and the deployment of modern technologies and materials, including screenprinting and the acid-etching of float glass.

Below the stained glass runs a calligraphic mosaic band designed by Iranian-Armenian painter Edman Ayvazyan. The hand-cut glass-and-marble mosaic, measuring 250 square metres (2,700 sq ft) and fabricated with Clarke's assistance, was the largest in the world at the time.

=== Runways and aprons ===
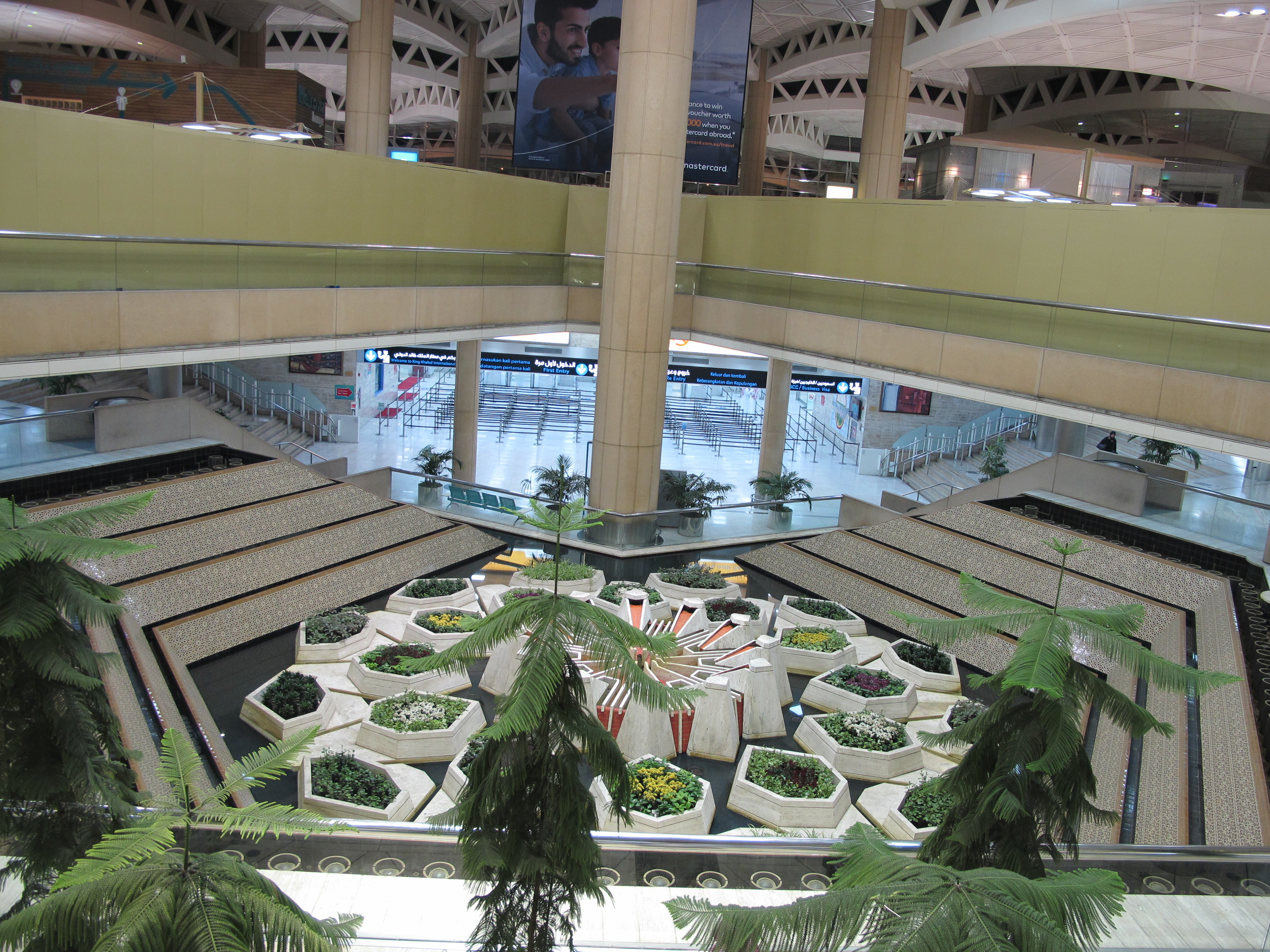
Arrival area interior

Runway and apron infrastructure
Aspect	Details
Runways	2
Runway length	4,205 m (13,796 ft)
Runway width	60 m (200 ft)
Runway shoulders	7.5 m (25 ft) x 2
Runway paved blast pads	120 m (390 ft) x 2
Taxiway width	23 m (75 ft)
Taxiway shoulders	13 m (43 ft) x 2
The highest point of the landing	226 m (741 ft)
Cross taxiway width	28 m (92 ft)
Cross taxiway shoulders	14.5 m (48 ft) x 2
Large-sized aircraft stands	20 + 12 royal terminal
Small-sized aircraft stands	22
Cargo aircraft stands	4 (Large)
General aviation stands	36
Helipads	1 Royal terminal

=== Air traffic control tower ===
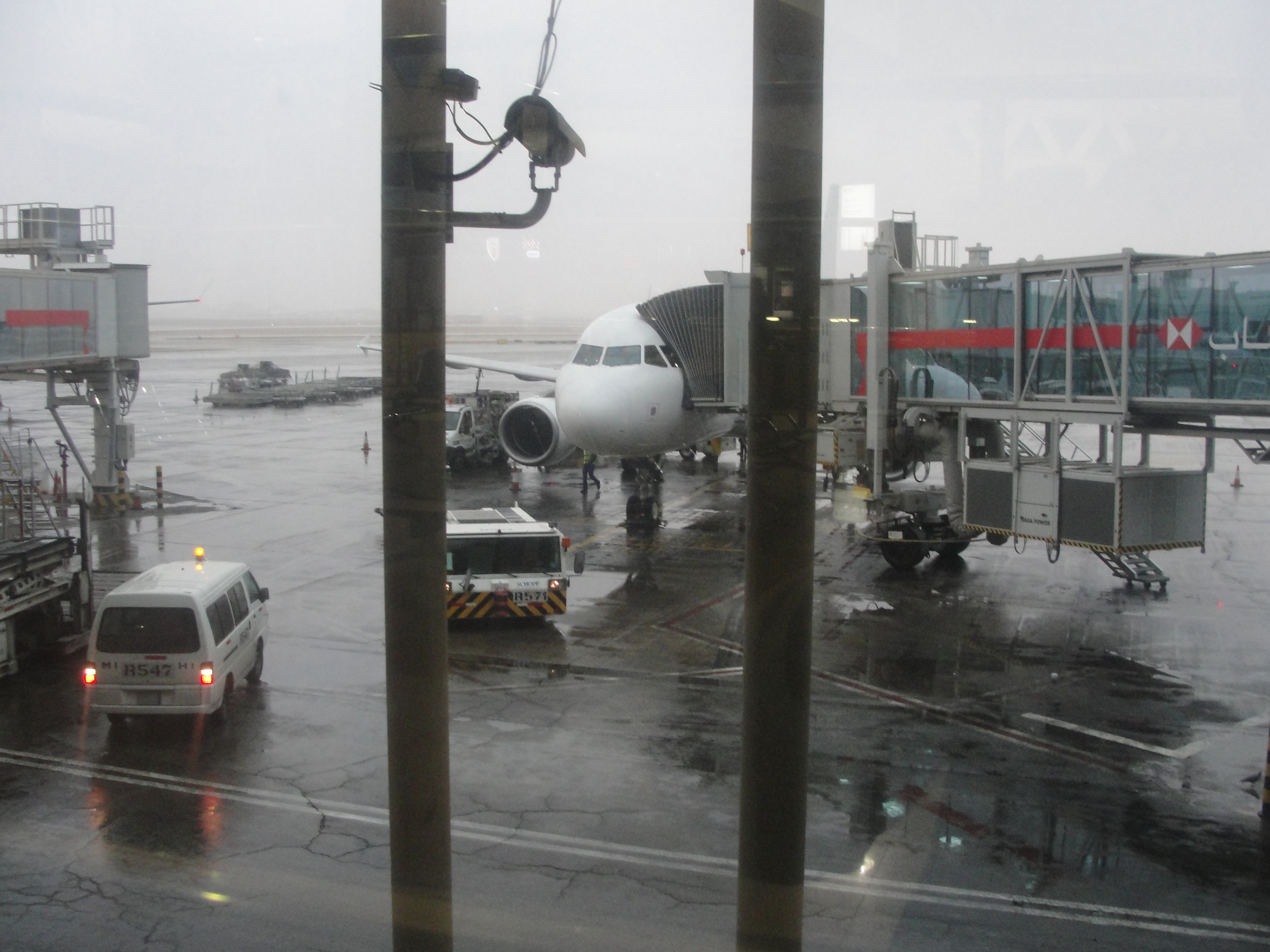
An airbridge connected to an Airbus A320

The 81-metre (265 ft 9 in) tall air traffic control tower is located in the passenger terminal complex between the Royal Pavilion and the mosque.

An airport operations control center opened in 2022, housing over 25 agencies including operational, security, and service.

== Airlines and destinations ==
=== Passenger ===
Airlines	Destinations
Air Arabia	Alexandria, Cairo, Sharjah
Air Cairo	Alexandria, Giza, Sohag; Seasonal: Sharm El Sheikh
Air China	Beijing–Capital
Air France	Paris–Charles de Gaulle (suspended until 31 October 2026)
Air India Express	Bengaluru, Delhi, Kozhikode, Lucknow, Thiruvananthapuram
AirSial	Islamabad, Lahore
AJet	Istanbul–Sabiha Gökçen
Akasa Air	Kochi, Kozhikode, Mumbai–Shivaji
Azerbaijan Airlines	Baku
azimuth	Sochi
BeOnd	Malé
Cathay Pacific	Hong Kong (suspended until 31 January 2027)
Cebu Pacific	Manila (suspended until 31 October 2026)
China Eastern Airlines	Shanghai–Pudong
China Southern Airlines	Guangzhou, Shenzhen
Egyptair	Alexandria, Cairo
Emirates	Dubai–International
Ethiopian Airlines	Addis Ababa
Etihad Airways	Abu Dhabi
Fly Jinnah	Islamabad
Flyadeal	Arar, Cairo, Damascus, Dubai–Al Maktoum, Gurayat, Hyderabad, Islamabad, Karachi, Kuwait City, Lahore, Medina, Peshawar, Sialkot, Tabuk; Seasonal: Antalya, Bergamo, Bodrum, Larnaca, Prague, Sarajevo, Trabzon
Flydubai	Dubai–International
Flynas	Addis Ababa, Aleppo, Arar, Assiut, Beirut, Bodrum, Damascus, Delhi, Doha, Dubai–Al Maktoum, Entebbe, Giza, Hatay, Hyderabad, Kochi, Kozhikode, Lucknow, Moscow–Vnukovo, Sohag, Tashkent; Seasonal: Abu Dhabi, Antalya, El Alamein, Geneva, Hurghada, Istanbul, Kraków, Nairobi–Jomo Kenyatta, Prague, Rize–Artvin, Rome–Fiumicino, Salalah
Gulf Air	Bahrain
IndiGo	Bengaluru, Hyderabad, Mumbai–Shivaji
ITA Airways	Rome–Fiumicino
Kam Air	Kabul
KLM	Amsterdam (suspended until 31 October 2026)
Kuwait Airways	Kuwait City
LOT Polish Airlines	Warsaw–Chopin
Lufthansa	Frankfurt (suspended until 18 November 2026)
Oman Air	Muscat
Pakistan International Airlines	Sialkot
Pegasus Airlines	Istanbul–Sabiha Gökçen; Seasonal: Trabzon
Qatar Airways	Doha
Riyadh Air	Bangkok–Suvarnabhumi, Cairo, Dhaka, Dubai–International, Islamabad, Jakarta–Soekarno-Hatta, Jeddah, Kuala Lumpur–International, Lahore, London–Heathrow, Madrid, Málaga, Manchester, Manila, Milan–Malpensa (begins 16 December 2026), Mumbai–Shivaji
Royal Jordanian	Amman–Queen Alia, Aqaba
SalamAir	Muscat
Saudia	Abha, Abu Dhabi, Al Baha, Alexandria, Al Jawf, Al Ula, Amman–Queen Alia, Arar, Athens, Bahrain, Bangkok–Suvarnabhumi, Beijing–Daxing, Bisha, Cairo, Casablanca, Dammam, Dawadmi, Delhi, Doha, Dubai–International, Frankfurt, Gassim, Geneva, Gurayat, Ha'il, Istanbul, Jeddah, Jizan, Kochi, Kozhikode, London–Heathrow, Male, Manila, Moscow–Sheremetyevo, Mumbai–Shivaji, Munich, Najran, Neom Bay, New York–JFK, Paris–Charles de Gaulle, Phuket, Qaisumah, Rafha, Red Sea, Rome–Fiumicino, Sharm El Sheikh, Sharurah, Tabuk, Ta'if, Tokyo–Narita (begins 16 January 2027), Turaif, Wadi al-Dawasir, Washington–Dulles, Yanbu, Zürich; Seasonal: Antalya, Barcelona, El Alamein, Jakarta–Soekarno-Hatta, Larnaca, Málaga, Milan–Malpensa, Mykonos, Nice, Venice, Vienna
Serene Air	Peshawar
Singapore Airlines	Singapore (resumes 28 March 2027)
Sudan Airways	Port Sudan
Thai AirAsia X	Bangkok–Don Mueang
Turkish Airlines	Istanbul
US-Bangla Airlines	Dhaka

=== Cargo ===
Airlines	Destinations
Atlas Air	Bangkok–Suvarnabhumi, Delhi, Hahn, Hong Kong, Zaragoza
Cathay Cargo	Dubai–Al Maktoum, Hong Kong
Central Airlines	Shenzhen
Qatar Airways Cargo	Doha
Saudia Cargo	Addis Ababa, Amsterdam, Avalon, Bengaluru, Brussels, Dammam, Frankfurt, Guangzhou, Hong Kong, Houston–Intercontinental, Hyderabad, Jeddah, Lagos, Milan–Malpensa, Mumbai, Nairobi, New York–JFK, Shanghai–Pudong, Sharjah
Turkish Cargo	Istanbul, Mumbai
FedEx Express	Paris–Charles de Gaulle

== Traffic statistics ==
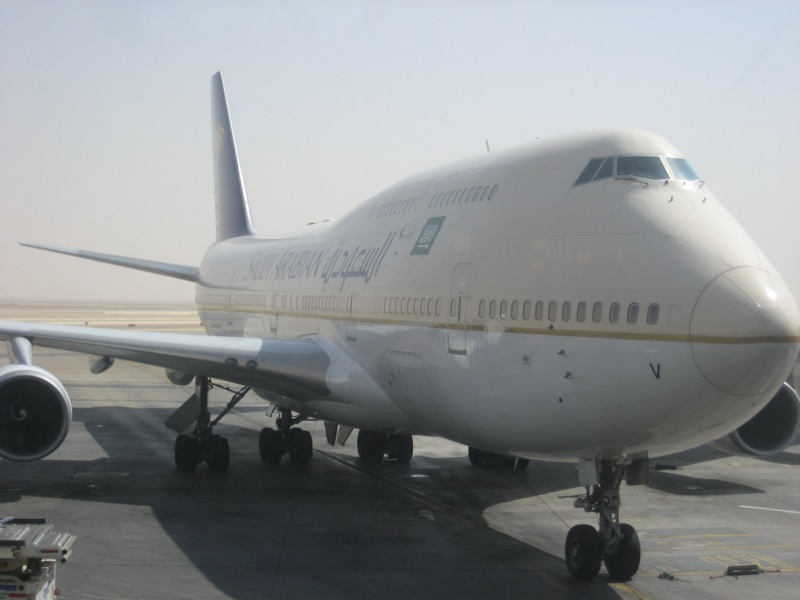
A Saudia Boeing 747-400 at the gate

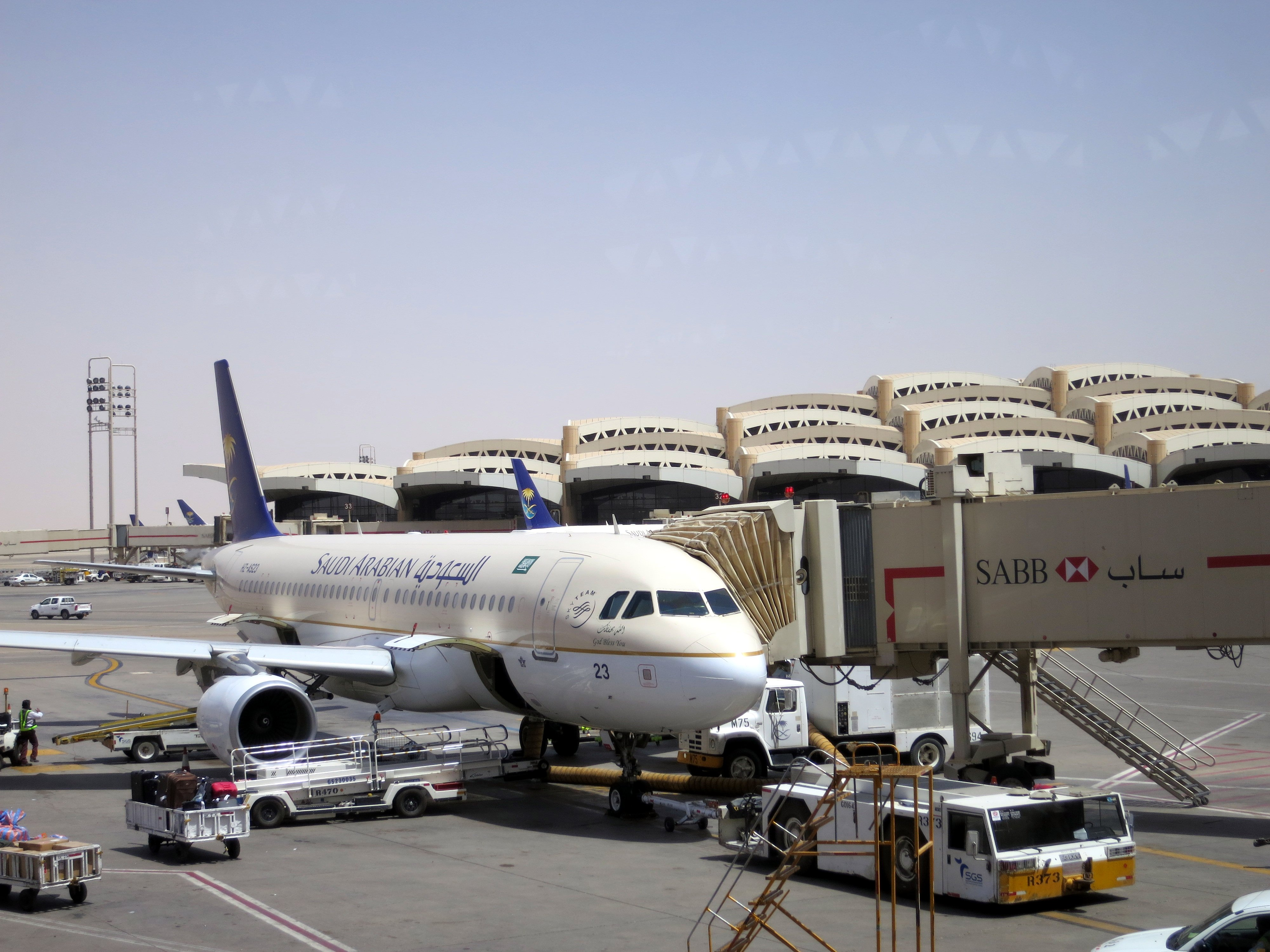
A Saudia Airbus A320 at the gate

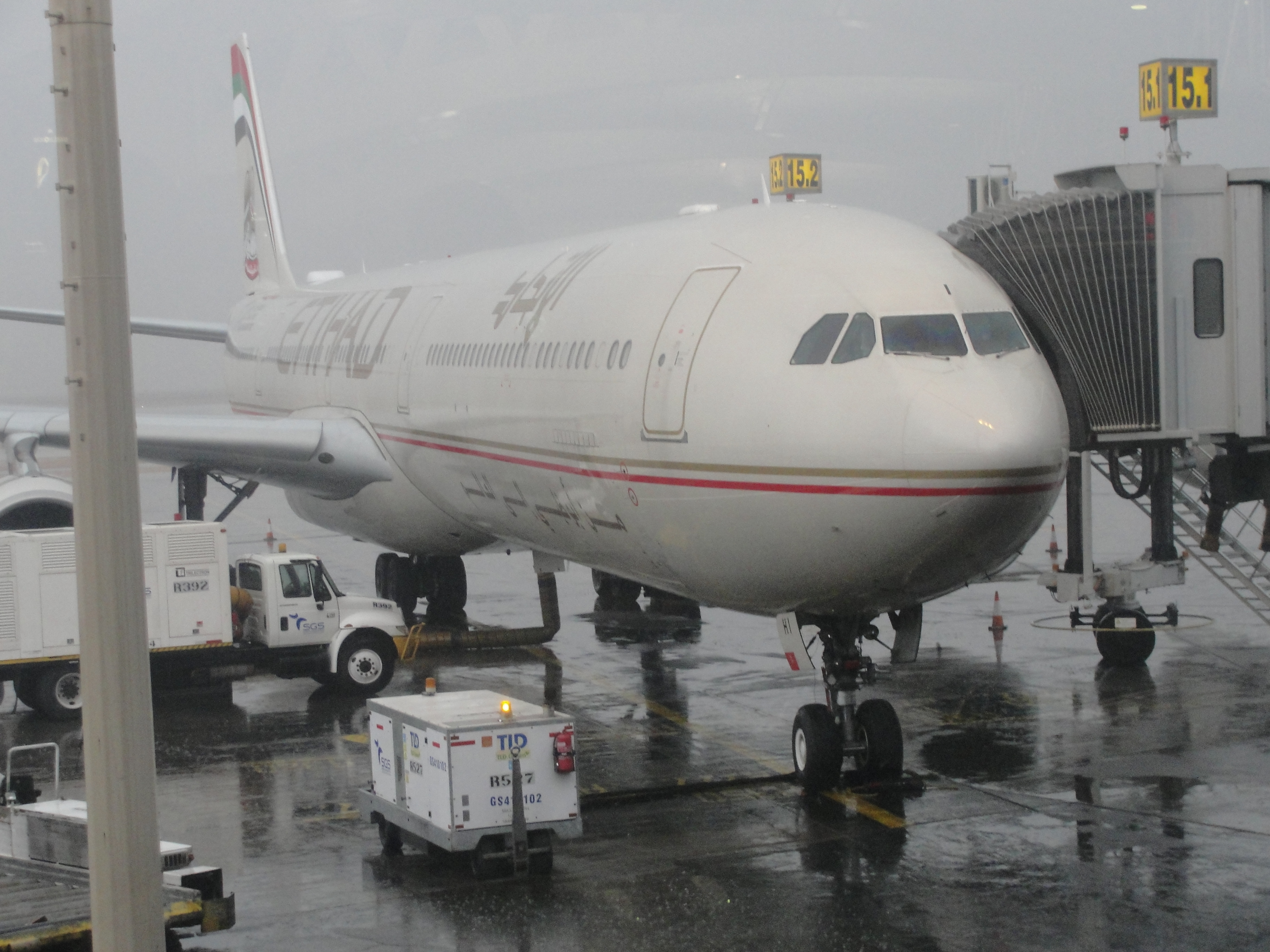
An Etihad Airways Airbus A340 at the gate

Statistics for King Khalid International Airport
Year	Total passengers	Total aircraft movements
1998	8,055,000	70,909
1999	8,234,000	73,336
2000	8,411,000	74,945
2001	8,737,000	75,535
2002	9,045,000	75,623
2003	9,168,000	74,600
2004	9,911,000	77,327
2005	10,573,000	84,555
2006	11,017,000	94,250
2007	11,783,000	112,210
2008	11,540,000	114,429
2009	12,674,000	127,666
2010	13,616,000	129,613
2011	14,898,000	135,757
2012	17,069,000	153,533
2013	18,585,000	161,314
2023	37,000,000	239,000
2024	37,000,000	269,000

== Ground transportation ==
=== Metro ===
The airport is served by Line 4 of the Riyadh Metro, with the line opening on 1 December 2024. The metro system helps passengers reach the city center quickly and comfortably, and the stations serving the airport include Airport T1–2, Airport T3–4 and Airport T5.

== Future ==
The airport will undergo a mass expansion by 2030, by increasing its area to 57 km^{2} (22 mi^{2}), consisting of three to four large passenger terminals, from two runways to six runways among other facilities and amenities. It will be able to handle 120 million passengers per year after 2030, and 185 million passengers per year by 2050. This expansion will include the airport among the world's largest airports.

== See also ==
- List of airports in Saudi Arabia
- List of things named after Saudi kings
- Saudia
- King Abdulaziz International Airport
- List of the busiest airports in the Middle East
