= King Khalid Airport Mosque =

Mosque in Riyadh, Saudi Arabia

- Arabic: جامع مطار الملك خالد
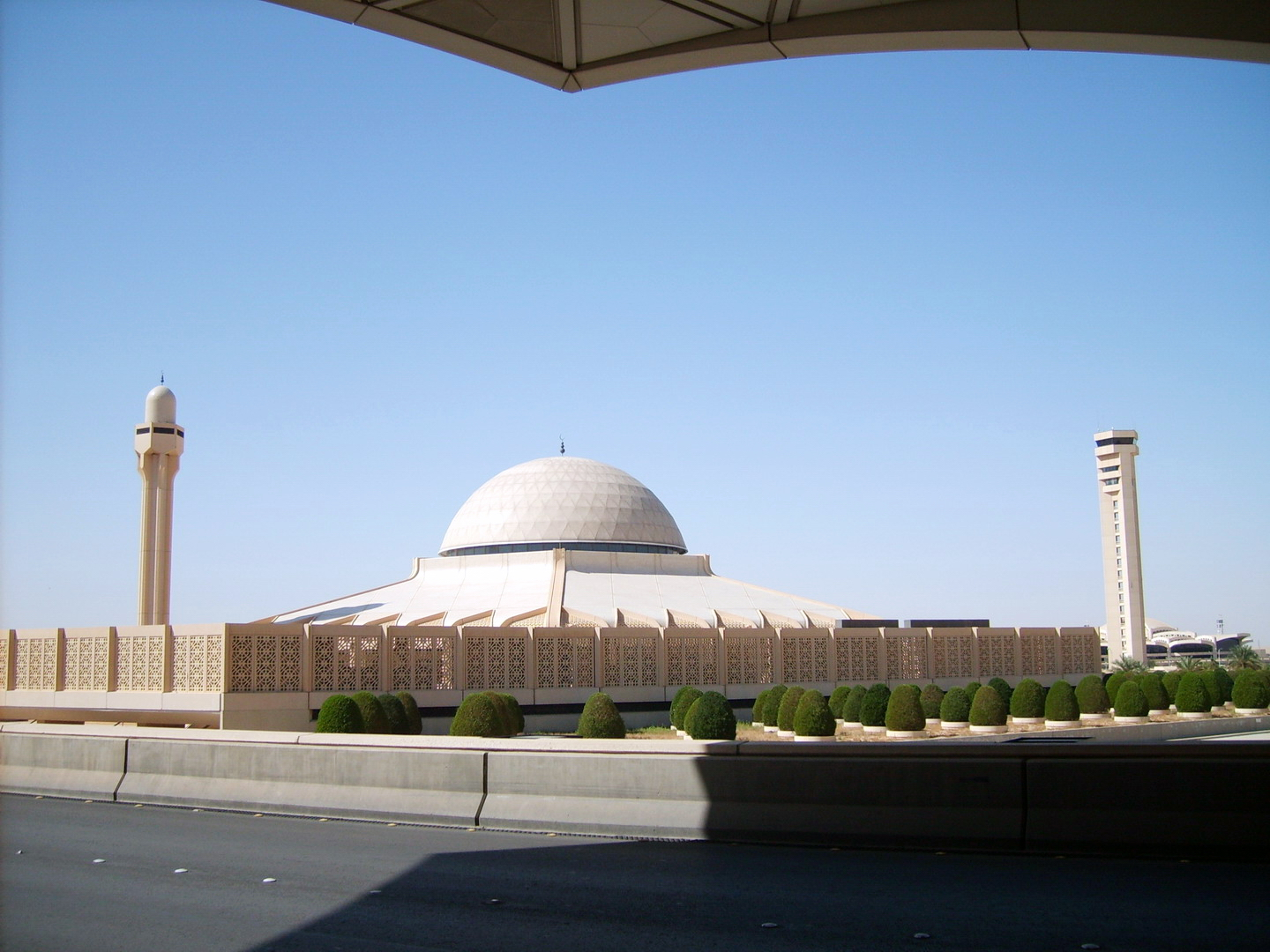
- The mosque, in 2007, with minaret at left, and airport control tower, at right

- Location in Saudi Arabia

Religion
- Affiliation: Sunni Islam
- Ecclesiastical or organizational status: Friday mosque
- Status: Active

Location
- Location: King Khalid International Airport, Riyadh
- Country: Saudi Arabia
- Interactive map of King Khalid Airport Mosque
- Coordinates: 24°57′32″N 46°42′05″E

Architecture
- Architect: HOK
- Type: Mosque architecture
- Style: Islamic
- Completed: 1983

Specifications
- Capacity: 9,000 worshippers
- Interior area: 5,600 m^{2} (60,000 sq ft)
- Dome: 1
- Dome dia. (outer): 33 m (108 ft)
- Minaret: 1
- Minaret height: 39 m (128 ft)

King Khalid Airport Mosque (Arabic: جامع مطار الملك خالد) is a Sunni Islam Friday mosque located within King Khalid International Airport in Riyadh, Saudi Arabia. Built in 1983, the mosque covers an area of 5,600 m^{2} (60,000 sq ft) in a hexagonal plan and was designed by the US-based architectural firm HOK. It incorporates elements of traditional Islamic architecture and primarily serves Muslim passengers arriving or departing through Riyadh.

== Overview ==
The mosque was constructed alongside the King Khalid International Airport by American architectural firm, HOK, in 1983. It was opened to worshippers in 1984.

Besides weekly Friday prayers, the mosque also hosts the annual Salat al-Eid prayers in its precincts during the Eid al-Fitr and Eid al-Adha occasions.

The airport was the first in Saudi Arabia to be built to then-contemporary engineering standards and the mosque was at the time of its construction the most modern mosque in the world, notable for its use of advances in construction and engineering to create a modern complex in a vernacular Arabic style, and for its program of integral art, at that time the largest in the world, marrying traditional Islamic decorative elements with, and interpreted through, the work of contemporary artists.

The King Khalid International Airport offers free shuttle services to the mosque for arriving and departing passengers.

== Architecture ==
Hexagonal in plan, and enclosing an area of over 5,600 square metres (60,000 sq ft), its scale, location and design make it the most dominant building in the passenger complex. The mosque can accommodate 5,000 worshippers inside, with capacity for an additional 4,000 in the surrounding plaza. The mosque's dome, 33 metres (108 ft 3 in) in diameter and internally clad in polished bronze, is internally separated from the lower roof of the building by a 2.1 m (7 ft) clerestory ring of stained glass windows, below which runs a calligraphic mosaic band designed by Iranian-Armenian painter Edman Ayvazyan. The dome's apex, at 40 metres (131 ft 3 in) above the arrivals level roadway, is higher than all the other structures in the passenger complex with the exception of the airport control tower and the mosque's minaret.

The hand-cut glass and marble mosaic, measuring 250 square metres (2,700 sq ft) and fabricated with the assistance of Brian Clarke, a British architectural artist, was the largest in the world. At the time of its construction, the programme of decorative and integral art for the mosque constituted one of the largest single art projects of the period. In the northeast corner of the mosque plaza, a minaret rises 39 metres (127 ft 11 in) above the plaza level. A spiral stairway inside the minaret provides access to loudspeakers that broadcast the prayer calls five times daily. There are 5,030 square metres (54,100 sq ft) of floor space on the main floor of the mosque and another 765 square metres (8,230 sq ft) on the mezzanine floor. A Koranic library off of the main mosque floor has 50 square metres (540 sq ft) of user space and the same amount for storage space. The library, private offices, and lavatories are located along the southeast on the southwest walls.

In 1982, through the Vesti Corporation, Brian Clarke was commissioned to conceive of a scheme of stained glass artworks for the interior of the Royal Mosque. Clarke made a study of Islamic ornament at the Quran schools in Fez and Tangiers for six weeks, and produced a series of abstract designs that engaged with historical pan-Islamic decorative tradition. Completed in 1982 and containing 2,000 square metres (22,000 sq ft), the interior of the mosque features artwork, carved marble banks, stained-glass windows and skylights, intricate ceramic-tile patterns, and carved wooden doors and screens which make it a showplace of traditional Islamic art. Passages from the Quran are also carved in the Kufic style of calligraphy form the unifying motif.

== See also ==
- Islam in Saudi Arabia
- List of mosques in Saudi Arabia
- List of things named after Saudi kings
