= Flyadeal =

Low-cost airline of Saudi Arabia

flyadeal

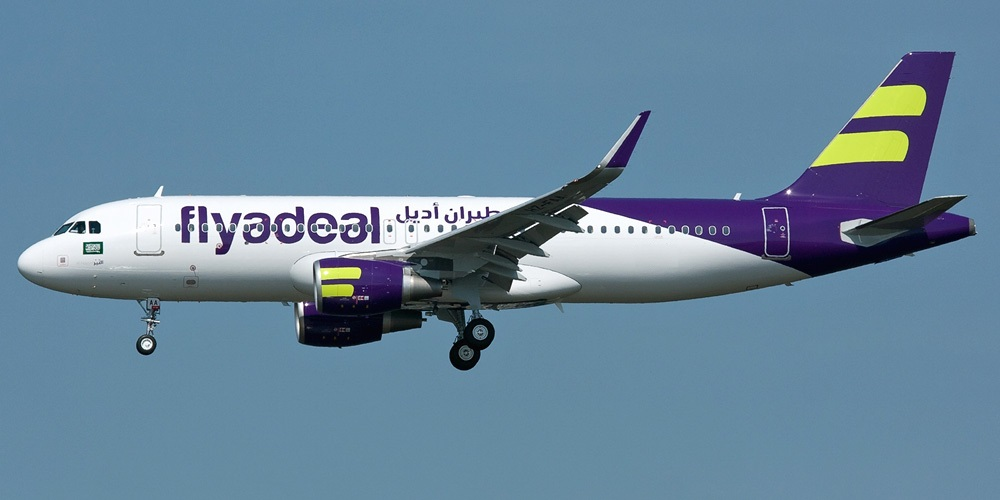
IATA	ICAO	Call sign
F3	FAD	ADEAL
- Founded: 17 April 2016; 10 years ago
- Commenced operations: 23 September 2017; 9 years ago
- Operating bases: Dammam; Jeddah; Riyadh
- Fleet size: 41
- Destinations: 24
- Parent company: Saudia
- Headquarters: Jeddah, Saudi Arabia
- Website: www.flyadeal.com

flyadeal (Arabic: طيران أديل, romanized: Tayaran Adil) is a Saudi Arabian low-cost airline headquartered at King Abdulaziz International Airport in Jeddah. It is a subsidiary of Saudia, Saudi Arabia's flag carrier airline.

== History ==
Saudia, the flag carrier of Saudi Arabia, announced the creation of flyadeal on 17 April 2016. The venture is part of Saudia Group's SV 2020 Transformation Strategy, which aims to elevate the group's units into world-class status by 2020. flyadeal targeted domestic travellers, Hajj and Umrah pilgrims and the rising number of tourists, among other groups. The airline launched flights on 23 September 2017, linking Jeddah to Riyadh. On 10 June 2022, flyadeal began operating flights from Dammam to Cairo. In 2025, the company expanded into South Asia by launching its debut flight to Pakistan. "flyadeal Adds Riyadh – Lahore Service in NW25".

== Destinations ==
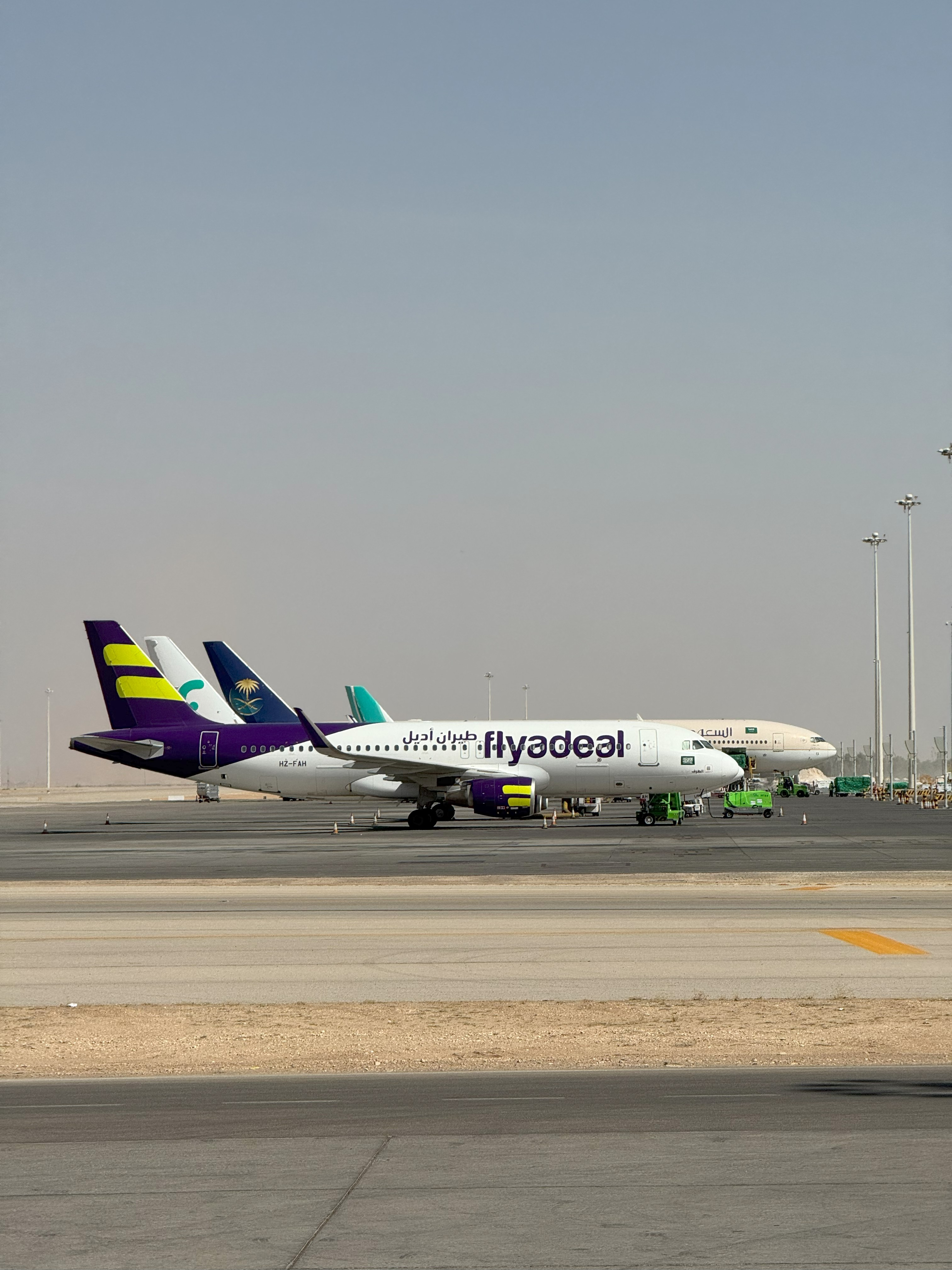
flyadeal and Saudia aircraft

Country	City	Airport	Notes	Refs
Azerbaijan	Baku	Heydar Aliyev International Airport	Seasonal	
Bosnia and Herzegovina	Sarajevo	Sarajevo International Airport	Seasonal	
Chad	N’Djamena	N'Djamena International Airport	Hajj	
Cyprus	Larnaca	Larnaca International Airport	Seasonal	
Egypt	Cairo	Cairo International Airport		
Egypt	Sharm El Sheikh	Sharm El Sheikh International Airport	Seasonal	
Georgia	Tbilisi	Tbilisi International Airport	Seasonal	
Indonesia	Makassar	Sultan Hasanuddin International Airport	Seasonal	
India	Kolkata	Netaji Subhas Chandra Bose International Airport	Seasonal	
Italy	Bergamo	Milan Bergamo Airport	Seasonal	
Jordan	Amman	Queen Alia International Airport		
Niger	Niamey	Diori Hamani International Airport	Hajj	
Nigeria	Kano	Mallam Aminu Kano International Airport	Hajj	
Pakistan	Karachi	Jinnah International Airport		
Pakistan	Lahore	Allama Iqbal International Airport		
Saudi Arabia	Abha	Abha International Airport		
Saudi Arabia	Al-Baha	Al-Baha Domestic Airport		
Saudi Arabia	Bisha	Bisha Domestic Airport		
Saudi Arabia	Dammam	King Fahd International Airport	Base	
Saudi Arabia	Ha'il	Ha'il International Airport		
Saudi Arabia	Hofuf	Al-Ahsa International Airport		
Saudi Arabia	Jeddah	King Abdulaziz International Airport	Base	
Saudi Arabia	Jizan	King Abdullah bin Abdulaziz International Airport		
Saudi Arabia	Sakakah	Al-Jawf International Airport		
Saudi Arabia	Medina	Prince Mohammad bin Abdulaziz International Airport	Base	
Saudi Arabia	Najran	Najran Regional Airport		
Saudi Arabia	Neom	Neom Bay Airport		
Saudi Arabia	Buraidah	Prince Naif bin Abdulaziz International Airport		
Saudi Arabia	Qurayyat	Gurayat Domestic Airport		
Saudi Arabia	Riyadh	King Khalid International Airport	Base	
Saudi Arabia	Tabuk	Prince Sultan bin Abdulaziz International Airport		
Saudi Arabia	Taif	Taif International Airport		
Turkey	Antalya	Antalya Airport	Seasonal	
Turkey	Bodrum	Milas–Bodrum Airport	Seasonal	
Turkey	Istanbul	Istanbul Airport		
Turkey	Trabzon	Trabzon Airport	Seasonal	
United Arab Emirates	Dubai	Al Maktoum International Airport		
United Arab Emirates	Dubai	Dubai International Airport		
Uzbekistan	Tashkent	Tashkent International Airport		

=== Codeshare agreements ===
flyadeal has a codeshare agreement with one airline:

- Saudia

== Fleet ==
As of September 2025, flyadeal operates the following aircraft:

flyadeal fleet
Aircraft	Total	Orders	Passengers	Notes
Airbus A320-200	11	—	186	
Airbus A320neo	30	15	186	Order transferred from Saudia. Further options for 20 aircraft.
Airbus A321neo	—	39	TBA	Order transferred from Saudia. Deliveries from 2026.
Airbus A330-900	—	10	TBA	Order with 10 purchase rights. Deliveries from July 2027.
Total	41	64		

On 7 July 2019, flyadeal revealed its intention to order 30 Airbus A320neo aircraft with a further 20 options. flyadeal had previously committed to the Boeing 737 MAX, but chose not to firm up its equivalent order of 30 aircraft and 20 options due to the Boeing 737 MAX groundings. Boeing attributed the decision to "scheduling requirements".

In July 2021, it was stated that flyadeal would start taking delivery of A320neo aircraft later that year as part of an order for up to 50 aircraft. The low-cost airline's future plans call for a fleet of 100 aircraft.

On 23 April 2025, after a long deliberation between ordering either the Airbus A330neo or the Boeing 787 Dreamliner, or simply transferring Boeing 777 aircraft from Saudia for dense long-haul routes, flyadeal ordered 10 A330-900 aircraft for those targeted newer markets, citing the Dreamliner's lack of adequate capacity in dense configurations and its long delivery wait time, and the 777's inability to fill its large capacity.

== Incidents ==
On 10 February 2021, a flyadeal Airbus A320 registered as HZ-FAB was damaged in a Houthi drone attack at Abha International Airport in Saudi Arabia. No injuries or fatalities were reported. The aircraft was subsequently repaired and returned to service.

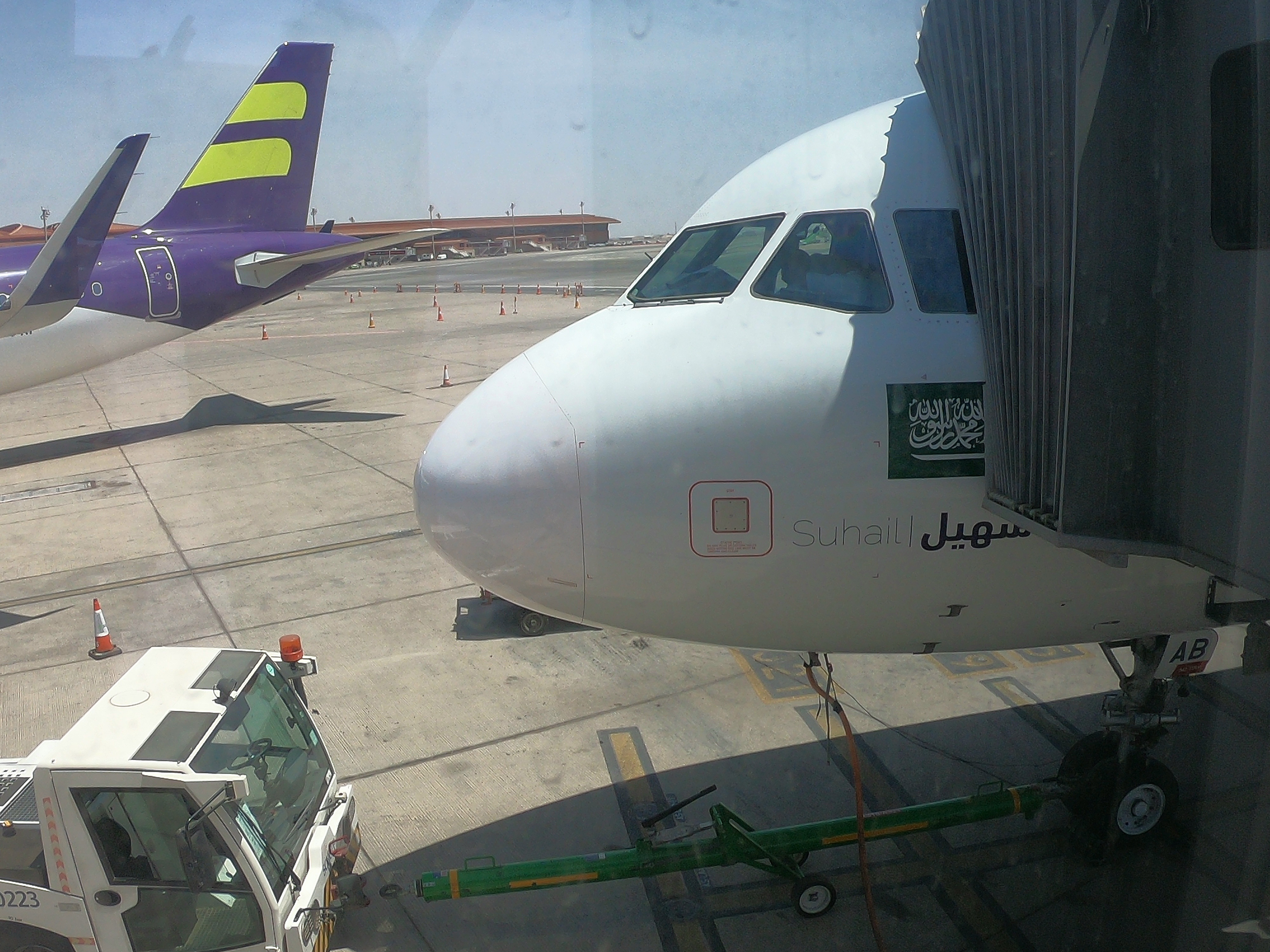
The aircraft involved in the incident (HZ-FAB) parked at Jeddah Airport 14 months earlier

== See also ==
- List of airlines of Saudi Arabia
