= King Fahd International Airport =

Saudi airport and largest in the world by area

King Fahd International Airport Mataar Al-Malik Fahd Al-Duwaly
- IATA: DMM; ICAO: OEDF

Summary
- Airport type: Public
- Owner: GACA
- Operator: Dammam Airports Company
- Serves: The entire Eastern Province
- Location: Northwestern portion of Dammam Governorate; 31 km (19 mi) northwest of downtown Dammam
- Opened: 28 November 1999; 26 years ago
- Hub for: Flynas; Flyadeal; Aramco Aviation (Mukamalah)
- Time zone: AST (UTC+3:00)
- Elevation AMSL: 22 m (72 ft)
- Coordinates: 26°28′16.3″N 049°47′54.9″E
- Website: kfia.sa

Maps
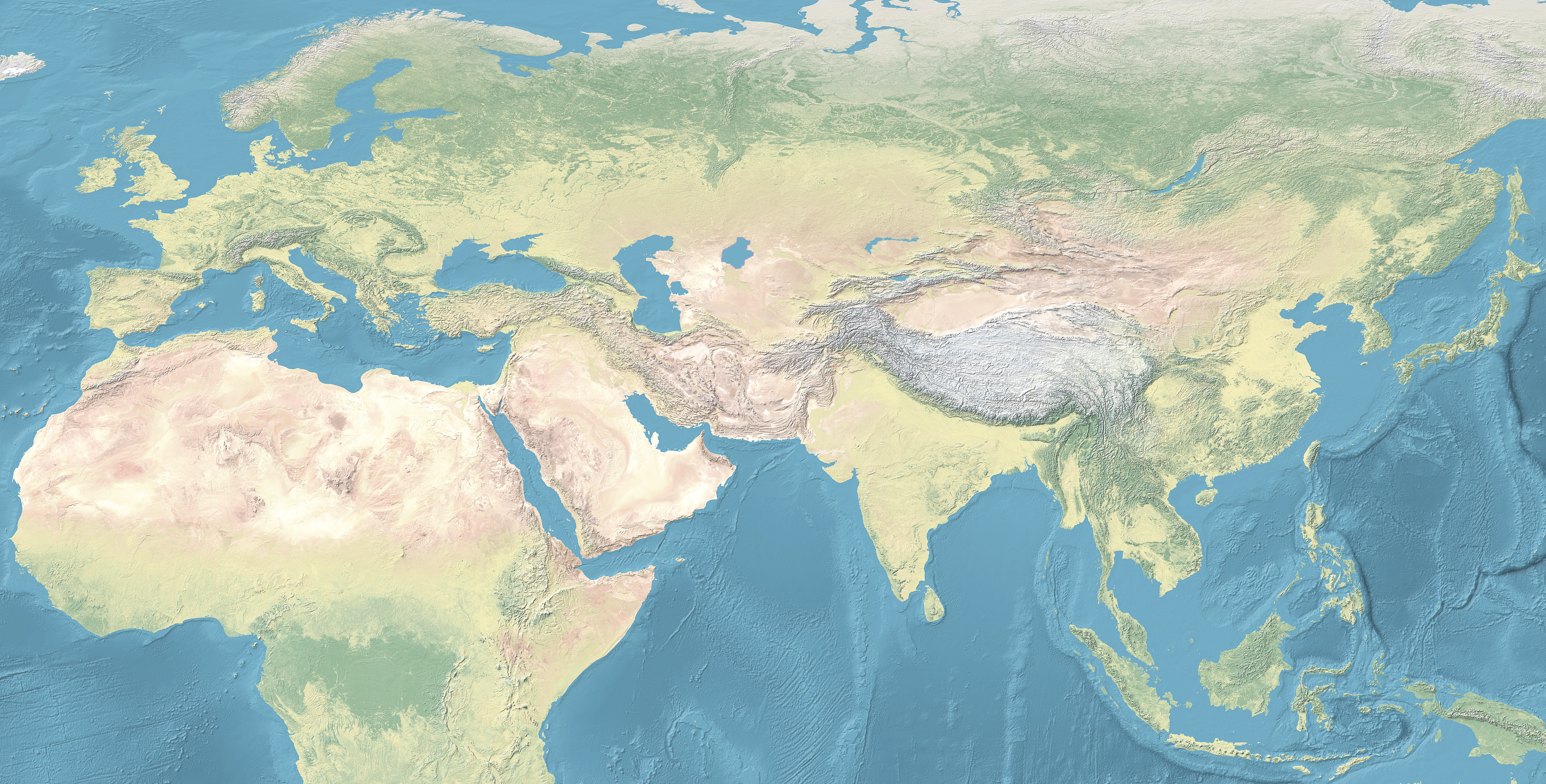
- Location of airport in Saudi Arabia DMM (Middle East) DMM (West and Central Asia) DMM (Asia) DMM (Eurasia) DMM (Afro-Eurasia)
- Interactive map of King Fahd International Airport

Runways
Direction	Length		Surface
Direction	ft	m	Surface
16R/34L	13,123	4,000	Asphalt
16L/34R	13,123	4,000	Asphalt

Statistics (2023)
- Passengers: 10,900,000
- Cargo (tons): 138,870
- Aircraft movements: 99,500+
- Destinations: 65

King Fahd International Airport (Arabic: مطار الملك فهد الدولي; abbr. KFIA) (IATA: DMM, ICAO: OEDF), also known as Dammam International Airport or simply Dammam Airport or King Fahd Airport, is the international airport serving Dammam, Saudi Arabia. The airport is located 31 kilometres (19 miles) northwest of downtown Dammam and is named after the former King of Saudi Arabia, Fahd ibn Abdulaziz (1921–2005). The airport serves the entire Eastern Province of Saudi Arabia and is one of the four primary international airports in the kingdom.

After its construction, it became a US airbase used primarily during the Gulf War, but the airport has been overseeing commercial operations since 28 November 1999 and has since expanded to provide connections to 43 destinations. Before King Fahd International, the primary airport serving the region was the much busier Dhahran International Airport, which has since been converted for military use and is now designated the King Abdulaziz Air Base. Since 1 July 2017, the airport has been operated and managed by the Dammam Airports Company (DACO). Commercial transport was only halted once throughout the history of the airport when, on 21 March 2020, the Saudi Press Agency (SPA) announced the suspension of all domestic and international travel both within and to and from the kingdom due to the COVID-19 pandemic. Domestic operations were reinitiated on 31 May 2020, and international operations resumed on 17 May 2021.

The third largest airport in the kingdom by passenger volume, more than 10 million passengers use King Fahd International each year, and 37 airlines operate flights in and out of the airport. The airport serves as a hub to Flynas and Flyadeal. It previously served as a hub to Saudia as well as the now defunct Sama airline and SaudiGulf Airlines. In addition to these airlines, Saudi Aramco Aviation, the airline operated by Saudi Aramco, the state-owned oil giant, uses it to transport employees in and out of strategic locations such as Yanbu, Tanajib and Shaybah.

The airport is served by two runways; both 4 kilometres (2.5 mi) long, and consists of three terminal buildings: the Passenger Terminal serves mainstream passengers, the Aramco Terminal is used exclusively by Aramco employees to board Saudi Aramco Aviation flights and the Royal Terminal is reserved for use by the Saudi royal family. The busiest route operated between Dammam and another city is round trip to Dubai, with 70 weekly flights, an average of 10 flights a day.

== History ==
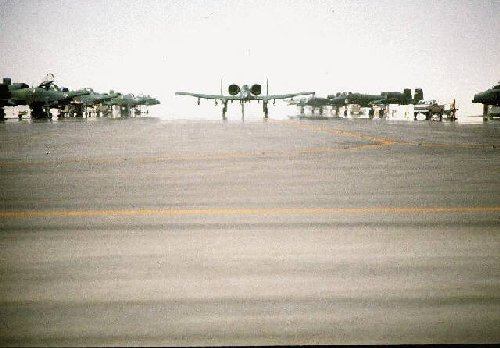
Top: A-10 Thunderbolt IIs parked on the taxiway of King Fahd Int'l Airport Bottom: A MIM-104 Patriot missile battery near the airport. The terminal building and mosque can be seen in the background.

The airport is named for King Fahd (r. 1982–2005), under whose reign it was constructed and inaugurated. As part of the government-run Airports Development Program, the planning stages for the third and final international airport began in 1976. The site master plan was created by architecture firm Yamasaki & Associates and Boeing and completed in 1977, with construction beginning in 1983. The basic infrastructure of the airport was complete by the end of 1990, which allowed the U.S-led coalition forces to use the airport during the Gulf War in early 1991 for the storage of military aircraft, including 144 A-10 Thunderbolt IIs, among other aircraft such as the AH-64 Apaches and CH-47 Chinooks of the 101st Airborne Division, before operations were transferred to the Ahmad al-Jaber Air Base in Kuwait.

The General Authority of Civil Aviation of Saudi Arabia inaugurated the King Fahd International Airport and opened it to commercial traffic on 28 November 1999, and all airlines transferred their operations from the Dhahran International Airport, which had been in use until then. Dhahran International has since been converted for military usage and was designated the King Abdulaziz Air Base.

As part of the Saudi Vision 2030 and the National Transformation Program, King Fahd International was corporatized in July 2017 under the Dammam Airports Company (DACO), which operates and maintains the airport. In an effort to mitigate the spread of COVID-19, all domestic and international flights were suspended until further notice on 21 March 2020. Following strict curfews and lowering in case numbers, domestic flights were allowed to operate once again on 31 May 2020. International flights finally resumed on 18 May 2021.

== Airlines and destinations ==
Airlines	Destinations
Air Arabia	Alexandria, Cairo, Sharjah
Air Cairo	Assiut
Air India	Mumbai
Air India Express	Bengaluru, Chennai, Delhi, Kannur, Mumbai, Tiruchirappalli
Airblue	Lahore
Akasa Air	Kochi (begins 26 October 2026)
Azerbaijan Airlines	Baku
Egyptair	Alexandria, Cairo
Emirates	Dubai–International
Ethiopian Airlines	Addis Ababa
Etihad Airways	Abu Dhabi
Fly Jinnah	Islamabad
Flyadeal	Karachi, Tabuk, Yanbu
FlyAden	Aden
Flydubai	Dubai–International
Flynas	Baku, Damascus, Lucknow, Red Sea
Gulf Air	Bahrain
Himalaya Airlines	Kathmandu
IndiGo	Lucknow
Iran Air	Mashhad
Jazeera Airways	Kuwait City, Vijayawada
Kuwait Airways	Manila
Lufthansa	Frankfurt
Nesma Airlines	Cairo
Pegasus Airlines	Istanbul–Sabiha Gökçen; Seasonal: Trabzon
Qatar Airways	Doha
Royal Jordanian	Amman–Queen Alia
SalamAir	Muscat; Seasonal: Salalah
Saudia	Beijing–Daxing, Jeddah, Riyadh
Turkish Airlines	Istanbul

== Statistics ==
At present, around 9.7 million passengers use King Fahd International Airport annually.

Statistics for King Fahd International Airport
Year	Total passengers	% international	Passenger growth	Total cargo (tons)	Commercial aircraft movements	Movements growth
2001	2,542,000	41%	▲0.4%	55,088	23,312	▼ −2.5%
2002	2,578,000	39%	▲1.4%	53,029	23,281	▼ −0.1%
2003	2,613,000	40%	▲1.4%	48,634	23,308	▲0.1%
2004	2,782,000	41%	▲6.5%	48,065	23,778	▲2.0%
2005	3,013,000	40%	▲8.3%	49,633	24,457	▲2.9%
2006	3,341,000	43%	▲10.9%	59,610	29,162	▲19.2%
2007	4,092,000	41%	▲15.0%	67,427	48,653	▲34.6%
2008	4,165,000	47%	▲1.1%	97,596	50,926	▲3.9%
2009	4,422,000	48%	▲6.8%	83,652	51,166	▲0.7%
2010	4,835,000	52%	▲10.1%	83,426	56,156	▲10.8%
2011	5,531,000	56%	▲15.3%	82,832	62,060	▲11.9%
2012	6,422,000	56%	▲16.5%	103,421	67,390	▲9.6%
2013	7,311,000	55%	▲19.1%	121,655	72,897	▲9.3%
2014	8,248,000	54%	▲12.8%	115,830	79,284	▲9.8%
2015	9,407,000	53%	▲14.0%	95,321	84,803	▲7.8%
2016	9,690,000	53%	▲3.0%	138,870	90,134	▲6.3%

Busiest international routes at King Fahd International Airport (by number of flights weekly)
Rank	City	Number of flights
1	Dubai, United Arab Emirates	70
2	Cairo, Egypt	34
3	Abu Dhabi, United Arab Emirates	28
4	Bahrain, Bahrain	28
5	Delhi, India	21
6	Sharjah, United Arab Emirates	18
7	Muscat, Oman	16
8	Mumbai, India	14
9	Istanbul, Turkey	14

=== Records ===
- King Fahd International Airport has been cited as the largest airport in the world by the Guinness World Records, owning 780 km^{2} (300 sq mi). However, most of this area is undeveloped desert and an unofficial website for the airport reports a utilized area of 3,675 hectares (9,080 acres), or 36.75 km^{2} (14.19 sq mi).
- One of the world's shortest international flights is operated between King Fahd International Airport and Bahrain International Airport, covering a great-circle distance of 87 km (54 mi).

== Ground transportation ==
The terminal can only be accessed via Route 605, a secondary expressway linking the cities of Khobar and Dammam in the south, and Qatif in the north; to the airport. Route 6466, a minor road and spur of Highway 40, links the highway to Route 605 and the airport. SAPTCO offers bus connections from Khobar and Dammam to the airport. Taxis are available at fixed prices to every major city and town in the kingdom, with rideshare companies such as Careem providing similar services.

== See also ==
- List of airports in Saudi Arabia
- Amaala International Airport
- List of things named after Saudi kings
- List of the busiest airports in the Middle East
