= List of Air Arabia destinations =

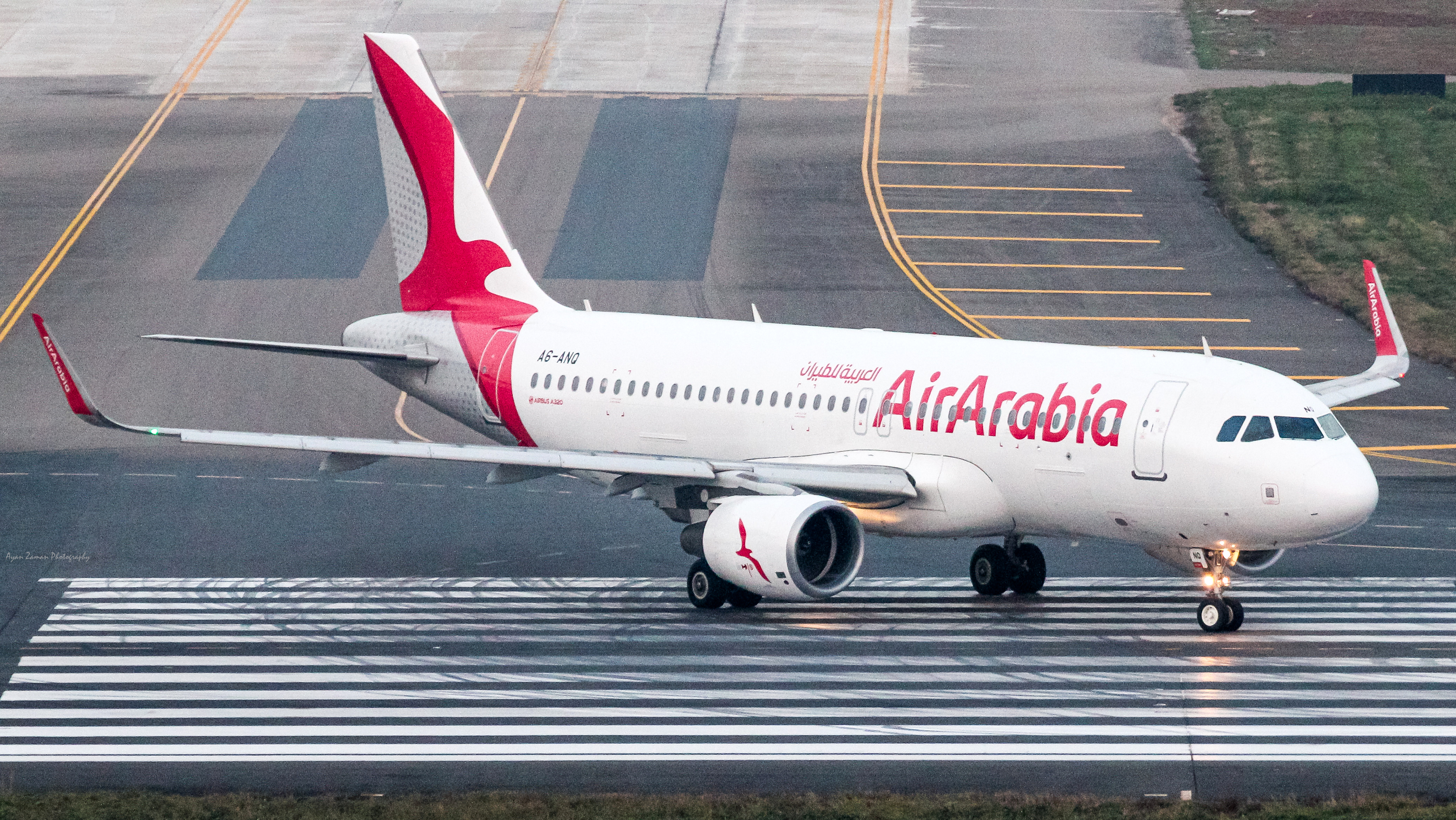
An Air Arabia Airbus A320-200 at Hazrat Shahjalal International Airport, Dhaka

Air Arabia serves the following destinations as of May 2023.

The airline's first destination was Manama, Bahrain in 2003.

The list also includes destinations served by Air Arabia Egypt and Air Arabia Maroc: as well as those of defunct subsidiaries Air Arabia Jordan and Fly Yeti.

== List ==
Country	City	Airport	Notes	Ref
Afghanistan	Kabul	Kabul International Airport		
Armenia	Yerevan	Zvartnots International Airport		
Austria	Vienna	Vienna International Airport		
Azerbaijan	Baku	Heydar Aliyev International Airport		
Azerbaijan	Qabala	Qabala International Airport	Terminated	
Bahrain	Bahrain	Bahrain International Airport		
Bangladesh	Chittagong	Shah Amanat International Airport		
Bangladesh	Dhaka	Hazrat Shahjalal International Airport		
Bangladesh	Cox's Bazar	Cox's Bazar International Airport		
Belgium	Brussels	Brussels Airport		
Belgium	Charleroi	Brussels South Charleroi Airport	Seasonal	
Bosnia and Herzegovina	Sarajevo	Sarajevo International Airport	Seasonal	
Bosnia and Herzegovina	Tuzla	Tuzla International Airport	Terminated	
China	Ürümqi	Ürümqi Diwopu International Airport	Terminated	
Czech Republic	Prague	Václav Havel Airport Prague	Resumes 20 December 2025	
Denmark	Billund	Billund Airport	Terminated	
Denmark	Copenhagen	Copenhagen Airport	Terminated	
Egypt	Alexandria	Borg El Arab Airport	Hub	
Egypt	Assiut	Assiut Airport	Terminated	
Egypt	Aswan	Aswan International Airport	Terminated	
Egypt	Cairo	Cairo International Airport		
Egypt	Giza	Sphinx International Airport		
Egypt	Hurghada	Hurghada International Airport	Terminated	
Egypt	Luxor	Luxor International Airport	Terminated	
Egypt	Sharm El Sheikh	Sharm El Sheikh International Airport	Terminated	
Egypt	Sohag	Sohag International Airport		
Eritrea	Asmara	Asmara International Airport	Terminated	
Ethiopia	Addis Ababa	Addis Ababa Bole International Airport		
France	Bordeaux	Bordeaux–Mérignac Airport		
France	Lyon	Lyon–Saint-Exupéry Airport		
France	Marseille	Marseille Provence Airport		
France	Montpellier	Montpellier–Méditerranée Airport		
France	Nice	Nice Côte d'Azur Airport		
France	Paris	Charles de Gaulle Airport		
France	Pau	Pau Pyrénées Airport	Terminated	
France	Strasbourg	Strasbourg Airport		
France	Toulouse	Toulouse–Blagnac Airport		
Georgia	Batumi	Batumi International Airport	Terminated	
Georgia	Tbilisi	Tbilisi International Airport		
Germany	Cologne/Bonn	Cologne Bonn Airport		
Germany	Düsseldorf	Weeze Airport	Terminated	
Germany	Frankfurt	Frankfurt Airport	Terminated	
Germany	Frankfurt	Frankfurt–Hahn Airport	Seasonal	
Germany	Munich	Munich Airport	Starts 15 December 2025	
Greece	Athens	Athens International Airport		
India	Ahmedabad	Sardar Vallabhbhai Patel International Airport		
India	Bangalore	Kempegowda International Airport		
India	Chennai	Chennai International Airport		
India	Coimbatore	Coimbatore International Airport		
India	Delhi	Indira Gandhi International Airport		
India	Goa	Dabolim Airport	Terminated	
India	Goa	Manohar International Airport		
India	Hyderabad	Rajiv Gandhi International Airport		
India	Jaipur	Jaipur International Airport		
India	Kochi	Cochin International Airport		
India	Kolkata	Netaji Subhas Chandra Bose International Airport		
India	Kozhikode	Calicut International Airport		
India	Mumbai	Chhatrapati Shivaji Maharaj International Airport		
India	Nagpur	Dr. Babasaheb Ambedkar International Airport		
India	Thiruvananthapuram	Trivandrum International Airport		
Iran	Abadan	Abadan International Airport	Terminated	
Iran	Isfahan	Isfahan International Airport	Terminated	
Iran	Lar	Larestan International Airport		
Iran	Mashhad	Mashhad International Airport		
Iran	Sanandaj	Sanandaj Airport	Terminated	
Iran	Shiraz	Shiraz International Airport		
Iran	Tehran	Tehran Imam Khomeini International Airport		
Iraq	Baghdad	Baghdad International Airport		
Iraq	Basra	Basra International Airport	Terminated	
Iraq	Erbil	Erbil International Airport		
Iraq	Najaf	Al Najaf International Airport		
Iraq	Sulaymaniyah	Sulaimaniyah International Airport	Terminated	
Ireland	Dublin	Dublin Airport	Terminated	
Italy	Bergamo	Orio al Serio International Airport		
Italy	Bologna	Bologna Guglielmo Marconi Airport		
Italy	Catania	Catania–Fontanarossa Airport		
Italy	Naples	Naples International Airport		
Italy	Pisa	Pisa International Airport		
Italy	Rome	Leonardo da Vinci–Fiumicino Airport	Terminated	
Italy	Turin-Cuneo	Cuneo International Airport		
Italy	Venice	Venice Marco Polo Airport		
Jordan	Amman	Queen Alia International Airport	Hub	
Kazakhstan	Almaty	Almaty International Airport		
Kazakhstan	Astana	Nursultan Nazarbayev International Airport	Terminated	
Kazakhstan	Shymkent	Shymkent International Airport	Terminated	
Kenya	Nairobi	Jomo Kenyatta International Airport		
Kosovo	Pristina	Pristina International Airport	Terminated	
Kuwait	Kuwait City	Kuwait International Airport		
Kyrgyzstan	Bishkek	Manas International Airport		
Kyrgyzstan	Osh	Osh Airport		
Lebanon	Beirut	Beirut–Rafic Hariri International Airport		
Malaysia	Kuala Lumpur	Kuala Lumpur International Airport		
Maldives	Malé	Velana International Airport		
Morocco	Agadir	Agadir–Al Massira Airport	Hub	
Morocco	Al Hoceima	Cherif Al Idrissi Airport	Terminated	
Morocco	Casablanca	Mohammed V International Airport	Hub	
Morocco	Fes	Fes–Saïss Airport		
Morocco	Guelmim	Guelmim Airport		
Morocco	Marrakesh	Marrakesh Menara Airport		
Morocco	Nador	Nador International Airport		
Morocco	Oujda	Angads Airport		
Morocco	Rabat	Rabat–Salé Airport		
Morocco	Tangier	Tangier Ibn Battouta Airport		
Morocco	Tétouan	Sania Ramel Airport		
Nepal	Kathmandu	Tribhuvan International Airport		
Netherlands	Amsterdam	Amsterdam Airport Schiphol		
Oman	Muscat	Muscat International Airport		
Oman	Salalah	Salalah Airport		
Oman	Sohar	Sohar Airport		
Pakistan	Faisalabad	Faisalabad International Airport		
Pakistan	Islamabad	Islamabad International Airport		
Pakistan	Karachi	Jinnah International Airport		
Pakistan	Lahore	Allama Iqbal International Airport		
Pakistan	Multan	Multan International Airport		
Pakistan	Peshawar	Bacha Khan International Airport		
Pakistan	Quetta	Quetta International Airport		
Pakistan	Sialkot	Sialkot International Airport		
Poland	Kraków	Kraków John Paul II International Airport		
Poland	Warsaw	Warsaw Chopin Airport		
Qatar	Doha	Hamad International Airport		
Russia	Grozny	Grozny Airport	Terminated	
Russia	Kazan	Ğabdulla Tuqay Kazan International Airport	Suspended until 27 March 2027	
Russia	Krasnodar	Krasnodar International Airport	Terminated	
Russia	Moscow	Moscow Domodedovo Airport		
Russia	Moscow	Sheremetyevo International Airport	Terminated	
Russia	Moscow	Vnukovo International Airport	Terminated	
Russia	Rostov-on-Don	Platov International Airport	Terminated	
Russia	Samara	Kurumoch International Airport	Suspended until 27 March 2027	
Russia	Sochi	Adler-Sochi International Airport	Suspended until 27 March 2027	
Russia	Ufa	Mostay Kərim Ufa International Airport	Suspended until 27 March 2027	
Russia	Yekaterinburg	Koltsovo International Airport	Suspended until 27 March 2027	
Saudi Arabia	Abha	Abha International Airport		
Saudi Arabia	Al Jouf	Al Jouf Airport		
Saudi Arabia	Dammam	King Fahd International Airport		
Saudi Arabia	Gassim	Prince Naif bin Abdulaziz International Airport		
Saudi Arabia	Ha'il	Ha'il Regional Airport		
Saudi Arabia	Hofuf	Al-Ahsa International Airport	Terminated	
Saudi Arabia	Jeddah	King Abdulaziz International Airport		
Saudi Arabia	Jizan	Jizan Regional Airport		
Saudi Arabia	Medina	Prince Mohammad bin Abdulaziz International Airport		
Saudi Arabia	Riyadh	King Khalid International Airport		
Saudi Arabia	Tabuk	Tabuk Regional Airport		
Saudi Arabia	Taif	Taif International Airport		
Saudi Arabia	Yanbu	Yanbu Airport		
Slovakia	Bratislava	Bratislava Airport	Terminated	
Somalia	Hargeisa	Hargeisa Airport	Terminated	
Somalia	Bosaso	Bosaso Airport		
Spain	Barcelona	Josep Tarradellas Barcelona–El Prat Airport		
Spain	Bilbao	Bilbao Airport		
Spain	Girona	Girona–Costa Brava Airport		
Spain	Madrid	Madrid–Barajas Airport		
Spain	Málaga	Málaga Airport		
Spain	Murcia	Región de Murcia International Airport		
Spain	Palma de Mallorca	Palma de Mallorca Airport		
Sri Lanka	Colombo	Bandaranaike International Airport		
Sri Lanka	Hambantota	Mattala Rajapaksa International Airport	Terminated	
Sudan	Khartoum	Khartoum International Airport	Terminated	
Sweden	Stockholm	Stockholm Arlanda Airport	Terminated	
Switzerland; France; Germany	Basel; Mulhouse; Freiburg	EuroAirport Basel Mulhouse Freiburg		
Syria	Aleppo	Aleppo International Airport		
Syria	Damascus	Damascus International Airport		
Syria	Latakia	Latakia International Airport	Terminated	
Thailand	Bangkok	Suvarnabhumi Airport		
Thailand	Phuket	Phuket International Airport		
Tunisia	Tunis	Tunis–Carthage International Airport		
Turkey	Bodrum	Milas–Bodrum Airport	Terminated	
Turkey	Istanbul	Istanbul Airport		
Turkey	Istanbul	Istanbul Sabiha Gökçen International Airport		
Turkey	İzmir	İzmir Adnan Menderes Airport	Terminated	
Turkey	Trabzon	Trabzon Airport		
Uganda	Entebbe	Entebbe International Airport		
Ukraine	Donetsk	Donetsk International Airport	Terminated	
Ukraine	Kharkiv	Kharkiv International Airport	Terminated	
Ukraine	Kyiv	Boryspil International Airport	Terminated	
Ukraine	Odesa	Odesa International Airport	Terminated	
United Arab Emirates	Abu Dhabi	Zayed International Airport	Hub	
United Arab Emirates	Ras Al Khaimah	Ras Al Khaimah International Airport	Hub	
United Arab Emirates	Sharjah	Sharjah International Airport	Hub	
United Kingdom	London	Gatwick Airport		
United Kingdom	London	London Stansted Airport	Terminated	
United Kingdom	Manchester	Manchester Airport	Terminated	
Uzbekistan	Tashkent	Tashkent International Airport		
Uzbekistan	Namangan	Namangan Airport		
Yemen	Sanaa	Sanaa International Airport	Terminated	
Yemen	Socotra	Socotra Airport		Terminated
