= List of Flydubai destinations =

Flydubai serves the following destinations:

== List ==
Country	City	Airport	Notes	Ref
Afghanistan	Kabul	Kabul International Airport		
Afghanistan	Kandahar	Kandahar International Airport	Terminated	
Albania	Tirana	Tirana International Airport Nënë Tereza		
Armenia	Yerevan	Zvartnots International Airport		
Austria	Salzburg	Salzburg Airport		
Azerbaijan	Baku	Heydar Aliyev International Airport		
Azerbaijan	Qabala	Qabala International Airport	Terminated	
Bahrain	Manama	Bahrain International Airport		
Bangladesh	Chittagong	Shah Amanat International Airport		
Bangladesh	Dhaka	Hazrat Shahjalal International Airport		
Bangladesh	Sylhet	Osmani International Airport	Terminated	
Belarus	Minsk	Minsk National Airport		
Bosnia and Herzegovina	Sarajevo	Sarajevo International Airport		
Bulgaria	Sofia	Vasil Levski Sofia Airport		
Burundi	Bujumbura	Bujumbura International Airport	Terminated	
Croatia	Dubrovnik	Dubrovnik Airport	Seasonal	
Croatia	Zagreb	Zagreb Airport	Seasonal	
Czech Republic	Prague	Václav Havel Airport Prague		
Democratic Republic of the Congo	Kinshasa	N'djili Airport	Terminated	
Djibouti	Djibouti City	Djibouti–Ambouli International Airport		
Egypt	Alexandria	Alexandria International Airport		
Egypt	Assiut	Assiut Airport	Terminated	
Egypt	El Alamein	El Alamein International Airport		
Egypt	Giza	Sphinx International Airport		
Egypt	Luxor	Luxor International Airport	Terminated	
Egypt	Sharm El Sheikh	Sharm El Sheikh International Airport	Terminated	
Egypt	Sohag	Sohag International Airport		
Eritrea	Asmara	Asmara International Airport		
Ethiopia	Addis Ababa	Addis Ababa Bole International Airport		
Finland	Helsinki	Helsinki Airport	Terminated	
Georgia	Batumi	Batumi International Airport	Seasonal	
Georgia	Kutaisi	Kutaisi International Airport	Terminated	
Georgia	Tbilisi	Tbilisi International Airport		
Greece	Corfu	Corfu International Airport	Seasonal	
Greece	Mykonos	Mykonos Airport	Seasonal	
Greece	Santorini	Santorini (Thira) International Airport	Seasonal	
Hungary	Budapest	Budapest Ferenc Liszt International Airport		
India	Ahmedabad	Ahmedabad Airport		
India	Bengaluru	Kempegowda International Airport	Terminated	
India	Chennai	Chennai International Airport	Terminated	
India	Delhi	Indira Gandhi International Airport		
India	Hyderabad	Rajiv Gandhi International Airport		
India	Kochi	Cochin International Airport		
India	Kolkata	Netaji Subhash Chandra Bose International Airport		
India	Kozhikode	Calicut International Airport		
India	Lucknow	Chaudhary Charan Singh Airport		
India	Mumbai	Chhatrapati Shivaji Maharaj International Airport		
India	Thiruvananthapuram	Thiruvananthapuram International Airport	Terminated	
Iran	Ahvaz	Ahvaz International Airport	Terminated	
Iran	Bandar Abbas	Bandar Abbas International Airport	Terminated	
Iran	Hamedan	Hamadan International Airport	Terminated	
Iran	Isfahan	Isfahan International Airport	Terminated	
Iran	Kerman	Kerman International Airport	Terminated	
Iran	Kish	Kish International Airport	Terminated	
Iran	Lar	Larestan International Airport	Terminated	
Iran	Mashhad	Mashhad International Airport	Terminated	
Iran	Shiraz	Shiraz International Airport	Terminated	
Iran	Tabriz	Tabriz International Airport	Terminated	
Iran	Tehran	Tehran International Airport	Terminated	
Iraq	Baghdad	Baghdad International Airport		
Iraq	Basra	Basra International Airport		
Iraq	Erbil	Erbil International Airport		
Iraq	Najaf	Al Najaf International Airport		
Iraq	Sulaymaniyah	Sulaimaniyah International Airport		
Israel	Tel Aviv	Ben Gurion Airport	Terminated	
Italy	Catania	Catania–Fontanarossa Airport		
Italy	Naples	Naples International Airport		
Italy	Pisa	Pisa International Airport	Seasonal	
Jordan	Amman	Queen Alia International Airport		
Jordan	Aqaba	King Hussein International Airport	Terminated	
Kazakhstan	Almaty	Almaty International Airport		
Kazakhstan	Aqtau	Aqtau Airport	Begins 19 December 2026	
Kazakhstan	Astana	Nursultan Nazarbayev International Airport		
Kazakhstan	Atyrau	Atyrau Airport	Begins 18 December 2026	
Kazakhstan	Şymkent	Şymkent International Airport	Resumes 25 December 2026	
Kuwait	Kuwait City	Kuwait International Airport		
Kenya	Mombasa	Moi International Airport		
Kyrgyzstan	Bishkek	Manas International Airport		
Kyrgyzstan	Osh	Osh Airport	Terminated	
Latvia	Riga	Riga International Airport		
Lebanon	Beirut	Beirut–Rafic Hariri International Airport		
Lithuania	Vilnius	Vilnius Čiurlionis International Airport		
Malaysia	Langkawi	Langkawi International Airport		
Malaysia	Penang	Penang International Airport		
Maldives	Malé	Velana International Airport		
Malta	Valletta	Malta International Airport	Terminated	
Moldova	Chișinău	Chișinău Eugen Doga International Airport		
Montenegro	Podgorica	Podgorica Airport	Terminated	
Montenegro	Tivat	Tivat Airport	Seasonal	
Myanmar	Yangon	Yangon International Airport	Terminated	
Nepal	Pokhara	Pokhara International Airport		
Nepal	Bhairahawa	Gautam Buddha Airport		
Nepal	Kathmandu	Tribhuvan International Airport		
North Macedonia	Skopje	Skopje International Airport	Resumes 1 April 2027	
Oman	Muscat	Muscat International Airport		
Oman	Sohar	Sohar Airport	Terminated	
Oman	Salalah	Salalah International Airport		
Pakistan	Faisalabad	Faisalabad International Airport		
Pakistan	Islamabad	Islamabad International Airport		
Pakistan	Karachi	Jinnah International Airport		
Pakistan	Lahore	Allama Iqbal International Airport		
Pakistan	Multan	Multan International Airport		
Pakistan	Quetta	Quetta International Airport		
Pakistan	Sialkot	Sialkot International Airport		
Poland	Kraków	Kraków John Paul II International Airport		
Poland	Poznań	Poznań–Ławica Airport		
Poland	Warsaw	Warsaw Chopin Airport		
Qatar	Doha	Hamad International Airport		
Romania	Bucharest	Henri Coandă International Airport		
Romania	Cluj-Napoca	Avram Iancu Cluj International Airport	Terminated	
Romania	Iași	Iași International Airport		
Russia	Grozny	Kadyrov Grozny International Airport	Terminated	
Russia	Kazan	Ğabdulla Tuqay Kazan International Airport		
Russia	Krasnodar	Krasnodar International Airport		
Russia	Makhachkala	Uytash Airport		
Russia	Mineralnye Vody	Mineralnye Vody Airport		
Russia	Moscow	Sheremetyevo International Airport	Terminated	
Russia	Moscow	Vnukovo International Airport		
Russia	Moscow	Zhukovsky International Airport	Terminated	
Russia	Nizhny Novgorod	Strigino International Airport	Terminated	
Russia	Novosibirsk	Tolmachevo Airport		
Russia	Perm	Perm International Airport	Terminated	
Russia	Rostov-on-Don	Platov International Airport	Terminated	
Russia	Rostov-on-Don	Rostov-on-Don Airport	Airport Closed	
Russia	Saint Petersburg	Pulkovo Airport		
Russia	Samara	Kurumoch International Airport	Seasonal	
Russia	Sochi	Adler-Sochi International Airport		
Russia	Tyumen	Roshchino International Airport	Begins 19 December 2026	
Russia	Ufa	Mostay Kərim Ufa International Airport		
Russia	Volgograd	Volgograd International Airport		
Russia	Voronezh	Voronezh International Airport	Terminated	
Russia	Yekaterinburg	Koltsovo International Airport		
Rwanda	Kigali	Kigali International Airport	Terminated	
Saudi Arabia	Abha	Abha International Airport		
Saudi Arabia	Gassim	Prince Nayef bin Abdulaziz International Airport		
Saudi Arabia	Dammam	King Fahd International Airport		
Saudi Arabia	Ha'il	Ha'il Regional Airport		
Saudi Arabia	Hofuf	Al-Ahsa Domestic Airport		
Saudi Arabia	Jeddah	King Abdulaziz International Airport		
Saudi Arabia	Jizan	Jizan Regional Airport		
Saudi Arabia	Medina	Prince Mohammad bin Abdulaziz International Airport		
Saudi Arabia	Nejran	Najran Domestic Airport		
Saudi Arabia	Neom	Neom Airport		
Saudi Arabia	Red Sea Project	Red Sea International Airport		
Saudi Arabia	Riyadh	King Khalid International Airport		
Saudi Arabia	Hafar al-Batin	Al Qaisumah/Hafr Al Batin Airport		
Saudi Arabia	Tabuk	Tabuk Regional Airport		
Saudi Arabia	Taif	Taif International Airport		
Saudi Arabia	Yanbu	Yanbu Airport	Terminated	
Serbia	Belgrade	Belgrade Nikola Tesla Airport		
Slovakia	Bratislava	Bratislava Airport	Terminated	
Slovenia	Ljubljana	Ljubljana Jože Pučnik Airport		
Somalia	Hargeisa	Egal International Airport		
Somalia	Mogadishu	Aden Adde International Airport	Suspended	
South Sudan	Juba	Juba Airport		
Sri Lanka	Colombo	Bandaranaike International Airport		
Sri Lanka	Hambantota	Mattala Rajapaksa International Airport	Terminated	
Sudan	Khartoum	Khartoum International Airport	Terminated	
Sudan	Port Sudan	Port Sudan New International Airport	Terminated	
Switzerland	Basel	EuroAirport Basel Mulhouse Freiburg		
France	Mulhouse	EuroAirport Basel Mulhouse Freiburg		
Germany	Freiburg	EuroAirport Basel Mulhouse Freiburg		
Syria	Aleppo	Aleppo International Airport	Terminated	
Syria	Damascus	Damascus International Airport		
Syria	Latakia	Latakia International Airport	Terminated	
Tanzania	Dar Es Salaam	Julius Nyerere International Airport		
Tanzania	Kilimanjaro	Kilimanjaro International Airport	Terminated	
Tanzania	Zanzibar	Abeid Amani Karume International Airport		
Tajikistan	Dushanbe	Dushanbe International Airport		
Thailand	Bangkok	Suvarnabhumi Airport	Terminated	
Thailand	Krabi	Krabi International Airport		
Thailand	Pattaya	U-Tapao International Airport	Terminated	
Turkey	Ankara	Ankara Esenboğa Airport		
Turkey	Antalya	Antalya Airport	Seasonal	
Turkey	Bodrum	Milas-Bodrum Airport	Seasonal	
Turkey	Istanbul	Istanbul Airport		
Turkey	Istanbul	Istanbul Sabiha Gökçen International Airport		
Turkey	İzmir	İzmir Adnan Menderes Airport	Seasonal	
Turkey	Trabzon	Trabzon Airport	Seasonal	
Turkmenistan	Ashgabat	Ashgabat International Airport		
Uganda	Entebbe	Entebbe International Airport		
Ukraine	Donetsk	Donetsk International Airport	Terminated	
Ukraine	Kharkiv	Kharkiv International Airport	Terminated	
Ukraine	Kyiv	Boryspil International Airport	Terminated	
Ukraine	Kyiv	Kyiv International Airport (Zhuliany)	Terminated	
United Arab Emirates	Dubai	Al Maktoum International Airport	Terminated	
United Arab Emirates	Dubai	Dubai International Airport	Hub	
Uzbekistan	Namangan	Namangan Airport		
Uzbekistan	Samarqand	Samarqand International Airport	Resumes 29 December 2026	
Uzbekistan	Tashkent	Tashkent International Airport		
Yemen	Aden	Aden International Airport	Terminated	
Yemen	Sanaa	Sanaa International Airport	Terminated	
