= Yasmeen Al Maimani =

First woman pilot from Saudi Arabia

- Born: Yasmeen Al Maimani; Kingdom of Saudi Arabia
- Occupation: Commercial Airline Pilot
- Years active: 2019–present
- Known for: First Saudi Woman Commercial Airline Pilot

Yasmeen Al Maimani (Arabic: ياسمين الميمني) is the first woman from Saudi Arabia and first woman from the Memon community to become a commercial airline pilot. She received her commercial pilot license from FAA in 2013, which she converted to Saudi General Authority of Civil Aviation (GACA) license and became the first Saudi Arabian commercial airline pilot in 2019. Her first official flight was on June 9, 2019 with Nesma Airlines.

== Initial years as pilot ==
Yasmeen Al Maimani obtained a PPL in 2010 from RJAA, Jordan. When she submitted this license in Saudi Arabia, it was rejected owing to the country lacking such a provision. She completed her studies in the US and having clocked 300 hours of flying practice, she was granted a Commercial Pilot License on 13 May 2013. She returned to Saudi Arabia and exchanged her license for the one issued by the Saudi Aviation Authority, GACA. For the next few years, Yasmeen Al Maimani searched for a job as a commercial pilot in Saudi Arabia but was refused owing to being a woman.

== Breakthrough ==
In 2018, Saudi Arabia announced a shift in policy in its aviation sector by hiring women to serve as cabin crew and permitting enrollment of women in flight schools. For the first time, Saudi women were given the opportunity to become co-pilots. Yasmeen Al Maimani applied along with more than 50 candidates. Eventually, she was among the 11 that were selected and underwent the mandatory training.

== First official flight ==
In June 2019, GACA declared Yasmeen Al Maimani as the first Saudi female pilot to fly a commercial airline. Her first official flight as a commercial pilot took place on June 9, 2019 between Ha'il Regional Airport and Prince Nayef bin Abdulaziz International Airport in Qaseem and between Ha'il Regional Airport and Prince Sultan bin Abdulaziz International Airport in Tabuk.

== See also ==
- History of women in aviation in Saudi Arabia
