= History of women in aviation in Saudi Arabia =

Women in Saudi Arabian aviation

Prior to June 2018, limitations to women's rights in Saudi Arabia and a longtime ban on women's driving largely kept women from participating freely in the country's general and commercial aviation industries. While there were no laws against women becoming pilots or participating in aviation, few would find entry into the industry. Negative stereotypes of women in aviation further limited opportunities. In 2002, requests by Saudi Crown Prince Abdullah asking that no women air traffic controllers be responsible for his flight while visiting Texas made international headlines. Before increasing liberalization of women's rights laws in the country, aspiring Saudi women pilots had to train abroad to obtain a pilot's license. Few would be allowed to practice their chosen profession on their return.

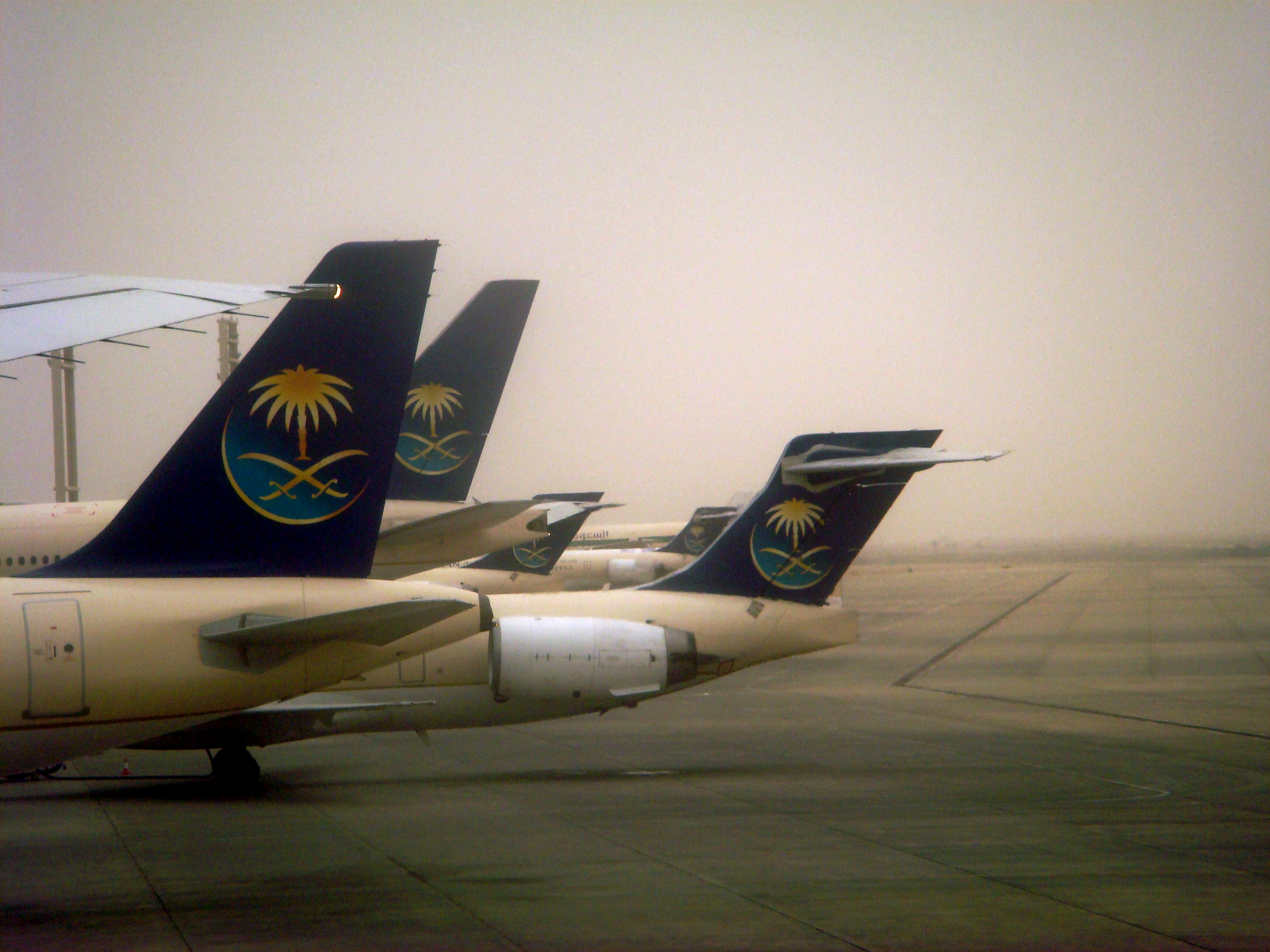
Saudi Arabian airlines

On 24 June 2018, Saudi Arabia lifted the longtime ban that prohibited women from driving as part of the country's Vision 2030 project. The policy created new opportunities for women in aviation, giving Saudi women wider opportunities to legally become airline pilots in their home country. The country's Vision 2030 reforms additionally provided new opportunities for women to become active across all areas of Saudi Arabia's aviation industry for the first time.

The following highlights key developments of non-military achievements of women in the Saudi aviation industry.

== Prior to 2018 ==
Prior to the removal of the ban on women's driving, women aviation pioneers had few opportunities to practice their chosen profession in the country. There were several notable exceptions:

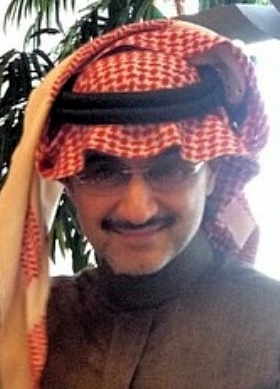
Al Waleed bin Talal personally intervened to issue the first commercial pilot's license to a woman to operate in Saudi Arabia

In 2013, Hanadi Zakaria Al-Hindi became the first woman to receive a commercial pilot's license in Saudi Arabia. It was made possible by an intervention by Saudi prince Alwaleed Bin Talal, who ensured that Al-Hindi, a private jet pilot for his Kingdom Holding Company would be able to fly within Saudi Arabia, despite the ban. The exception was possible as Al-Hindi's father, served as an employee of the prince and accompanied her on her flights. At the time, Al-Hindi was known as a pioneering Saudi woman aviator, whose earning of a pilot's license in 2001 made headlines. She trained abroad at Jordan's Middle East Academy of Aviation. She made her first solo flight as a pilot in 2004. In 2006, she became the first Saudi woman to earn a commercial pilot's license. She later took a job as a pilot flying for Kingdom Holding Company, where she received a 10-year contract to personally fly Alwaleed bin Talal's private jet.

In June 2014, Yasmin Al-Maimani became the second Saudi woman to receive a commercial pilot license from the General Authority of Civil Aviation. Al Maimani completed her pilot training in Jordan in 2010 and received her pilot's license in the United States. After exchanging her U.S. license for a Saudi pilot's license, Al-Maimani struggled to find pilot jobs in either Saudi or the Gulf. She would wait until the ban was lifted to pursue her flight career in Saudi Arabia.

The next significant achievement for women in Saudi Arabian aviation came in 2016, when an all-female flight crew from Brunei made history as the first women commercial aviators to land a flight in the country. In honor of Brunei's National Day, the Boeing 787 Dreamliner flight from Brunei to Jeddah was crewed by Captain Sharifah Czarena, and assisted by Senior First Officers Sariana Nordin and Dk Nadiah Pg Khashiem. The flight made international headlines for the paradox of female pilots operating in a country where they were legally not permitted to drive.

The next month, Turkish Airlines announced a recruitment drive for Saudi women pilots in reference to the ban. The company highlighted the need for more flight deck personnel and shared, “There are many positions in the airline industry for women. Turkish Airlines prefers to employ captains, both male and female, who are Muslim”.

On 26 September 2017, Saudi King Salman bin Abdulaziz Al Saud issued a decree allowing women to obtain drivers licenses the following year. Shortly after, Saudi flag carrier Saudia announced it would begin to consider offering scholarships to send Saudi women to flight training, in an effort to improve women's empowerment and support women's rights. At the time, the airline employed 500 Saudi women, but no women pilots.

== 2018-onwards ==
After the lifting of the driving ban, Saudi women began to make considerable strides into the aviation industry. At the time, Saudi Arabia's first woman pilot Hanadi Zakaria Al-Hindi said, “I’ve been in tears since yesterday – I can see all my dreams that for the last 13 years I’ve been fighting for. “We know now that the government’s on our side.”

The country's flight schools soon opened to women, and the response was enthusiastic. In July 2018, Oxford Aviation Academy reportedly received hundreds of applications from prospective women aspiring pilots. The response to an opening in the Saudi Academy of Civil Aviation was similarly received, as 130 women signed up to become air traffic controllers. In August 2018, the General Authority of Civil Aviation issued the first five licenses for women trainee pilots to work as aircraft captains. In September 2018, Flynas reported 1,000 women applied for positions within the first 24 hours after the airline opened recruitment for aspiring co-pilots.

=== 2019 ===
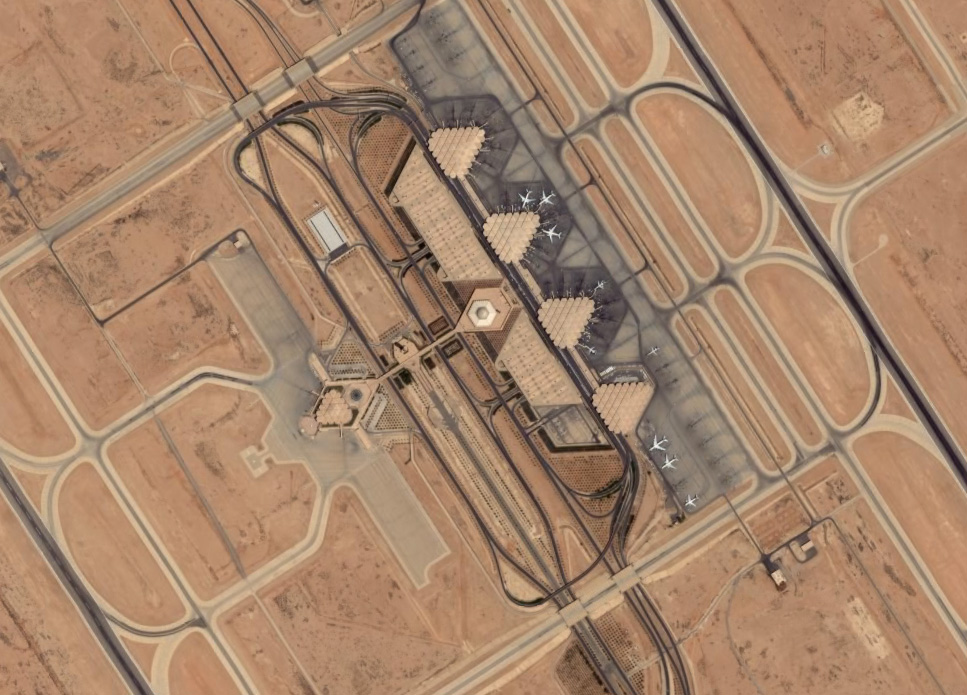
King Khalid International Airport, Riyadh

In March 2019, the Saudi Air Navigation Services announced the first appointment of 11 women to become the country's first female air traffic controllers. That month, pilot Rawia Abdulrahim Al-Rifi became the first Saudi woman to fly an Airbus A320 internationally as she flew for Etihad Airways. Al-Rifi studied civil aviation in the United Arab Emirates before joining Etihad.

On June 25, 2019, 29-year old co-pilot Yasmin Al-Maimani became the first woman to co-pilot a commercial airline in Saudi Arabia when she flew from King Khalid International Airport in Riyadh and Prince Naif International Airport in Qaseem. Al-Maimani previously was recognized as the second Saudi woman to receive a commercial pilots license. The Saudi Arabian General Authority of Civil Aviation announced the official milestone flight co-piloted by a Saudi female pilot. Al-Maimani earned her commercial pilot's license in the United States and undertook the flight as part of the flight crew for Nesma Airlines.

=== 2020 ===
The country's increasing openness for international visitors additionally created new opportunities for foreign women aviators in the country. In January 2020, international balloonists invited by the Saudi Commission for Tourism and National Heritage and the Royal Commission of Al-Ula were invited to fly hot air balloons in the country. British world record holding balloon pilot Allie Dunnington became one of the first foreign women to pilot a hot air balloon in the country during the trip.

International women aviators were later invited by Prince Sultan bin Salman to participate in an airshow at the Thumamah Airport operated by the Saudi Aviation Club. The airshow was hosted by Saudi female general aviation pilot Adwa Al-Dakheel.

By March 2020, 26 women had successfully completed training and were employed as air traffic controllers.

In December 2020, Saudi Arabian Airlines announced they had hired 23 women to serve as flight attendants across their routes.

=== 2021 ===
By 2021, Saudi low-cost carrier flyadeal employed 56 Saudi women employees, in roles across the organization from flight dispatching, air operations and as pilots.

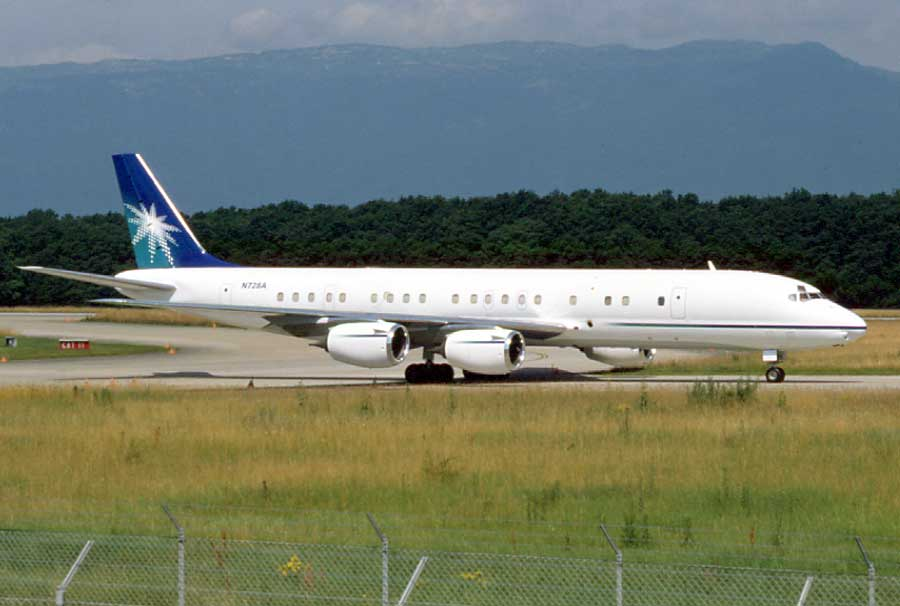
Plane operated by Saudi Aramco

=== 2022 ===
On 21 May 2022, flyadeal made the first domestic flight with an all-female flight crew. The Airbus A320 flight from Riyadh to Jeddah was co-piloted by the carrier's youngest female pilot, 23-year old Yara Jan. That summer, Saudi Aramco announced it had trained, sponsored and employed four fully qualified female pilots, who would join their 180 male pilot team.

=== 2023 ===
Based on the success of their initial crew of female pilots, in January 2023, Saudi Aramco launched an aviation training program exclusively for future women pilots.

In May 2023, 22-year-old Afrah Al-Harbi became Saudi Arabia's first woman to obtain a pilot's license to operate a hot air balloon. In September 2023, Reem Filmban became the first Saudi woman to become a certified helicopter pilot. Filmbam travelled to the United States to receive her pilots license after completing high school in Saudi Arabia. That month, the General Authority of Civil Aviation named Ibtisam Al Shihri the organization's first woman spokesperson. In December 2023, the country hosted its first Women in Aviation General Assembly to further encourage women's participation in aviation.

=== 2024 ===
In 2024, newly formed flag carrier Riyadh Air announced the launch of an all-female aircraft engineering program. The program received thousands of applicants for the 30-month diploma course.

== Saudi women in private aviation ==
- Randa Mohammed Bin Laden M.D., received her private pilot's license in Florida in 1978 after encouragement from her brother Salem bin Laden. Randa is considered the first Saudi woman pilot by the Ninety Nines
- Mara Krisbergs Culp, Latvian dental hygienist and private pilot who started the Arabian section of the Ninety-Nines in the 1980s while working for Saudi Aramco, as she was frustrated over the country's driving ban that prevented her from flying
- Nawal al-Hawsawi, recognized as one of the first Saudi women to qualify as a private pilot in the early 2000s. After receiving her pilot's license in the United States, she was unable to fly on her return due to the country's driving ban.
- Rayyanah Barnawi, first Saudi woman astronaut

== See also ==
- Timeline of women in aviation
