= Riyadh Airports Company =

Saudi Arabian airport management company

- شركة مطارات الرياض
- Formation: March 19, 2015; 11 years ago
- Type: Governmental
- Headquarters: Riyadh, Saudi Arabia
- Fields: Aviation management
- Parent organization: Matarat Holding Company
- Affiliations: Airports Council International
- Website: riyadhairports.com

Riyadh Airports Company (RAC) (Arabic: شركة مطارات الرياض), or simply Riyadh Airports (Arabic: مطارات الرياض), is a Saudi Arabian state-owned airport management company and a subsidiary of Matarat Holding that operates and provides aviation related services to the King Khalid International Airport in Riyadh, Saudi Arabia. It was established in 2015 by the country's General Authority of Civil Aviation as part of the government's strategy to privatize nationwide publicly owned assets amid falling oil prices.

== History and background ==
In November 2008, King Abdullah issued a royal decree that allowed the privatization of Saudi Arabia's civil aviation sector under the supervision of the General Authority of Civil Aviation. In April 2013, the General Authority of Civil Aviation established the Saudi Civil Aviation Holding Company.

In September 2013, Prince Fahd bin Abdullah al-Saud, then president of the General Authority of Civil Aviation floated the idea of privatization of Saudi Arabia's international airports before 2022 while opening them up to investments.

The emancipation of King Khalid International Airport, alongside its counterparts in Jeddah and Dammam from statutory entities was first surfaced in Saudi media in 2013, when Prince Fahd bin Abdullah al-Saud, then president of General Civil Aviation Authority established the Saudi Civil Aviation Holding Company and discussed the denationalization of the country's airports before 2022.

In April 2014, Okaz reported that the Saudi Civil Aviation Holding Company intends to privatize the King Khalid International Airport by September 2015.

In November 2015, the General Authority of Civil Aviation announced that Saudi Arabia's international and domestic airports would soon be opening up to foreign investments and will be privatized by 2020, beginning from the first quarter of 2016. The decision came as a result of falling oil prices due to the rampant global oil glut that was affecting the country's economy as well as attempts to privatize government-owned assets.

Riyadh Airports Company was officially established on March 19, 2015, through a decision of the Board of Directors of the General Authority of Civil Aviation and commenced its operations on July 1, 2016, after it assumed responsibilities of King Khalid International Airport.

Asharq al-Awsat reported that on the day of assuming responsibilities, the airport saw heavy mismanagement and irregularities in some of the terminals that resulted in the haphazard arrival and departure of several unscheduled flights, including the country's flag-carrier Saudia. Later, the General Authority of Civil Aviation and Riyadh Airports Company jointly apologized to the passengers for the incident.

In May 2017, the Riyadh Airports Company rebranded itself with a new identity by updating its logo, a move to exhibit a more "corporate" image of the organization rather than showing semblance of a public department, something which reflected in its initial customized logo of the General Authority of Civil Aviation. In July 2017, sources told Reuters that the Saudi government had appointed Goldman Sachs to manage the Saudi Civil Aviation Holding Company in order to sell a minority stake in King Khalid International Airport, however there was no reply from the American enterprise and the privatization was put on hold.

In 2021, Bloomberg reported that the Saudi government relaunched its privatization strategy after the General Authority of Civil Aviation announced transferring of all the airports in the country to Matarat Holding.

In June 2022, King Khalid International Airport was ranked 29th out of the world's top 100 airports and won the Skytrax award for being the most improved airport. In November 2022, it was ranked first among Saudi Arabia's airports in a report published by the General Authority of Civil Aviation.

In February 2023, Riyadh Airports Company announced the implementation of the facial recognition technology experiment at King Khalid International Airport.
