= Prince Mohammad bin Abdulaziz International Airport =

Airport in Medina, Saudi Arabia

Prince Mohammad bin Abdulaziz International Airport مطار الأمير محمد بن عبد العزيز الدولي

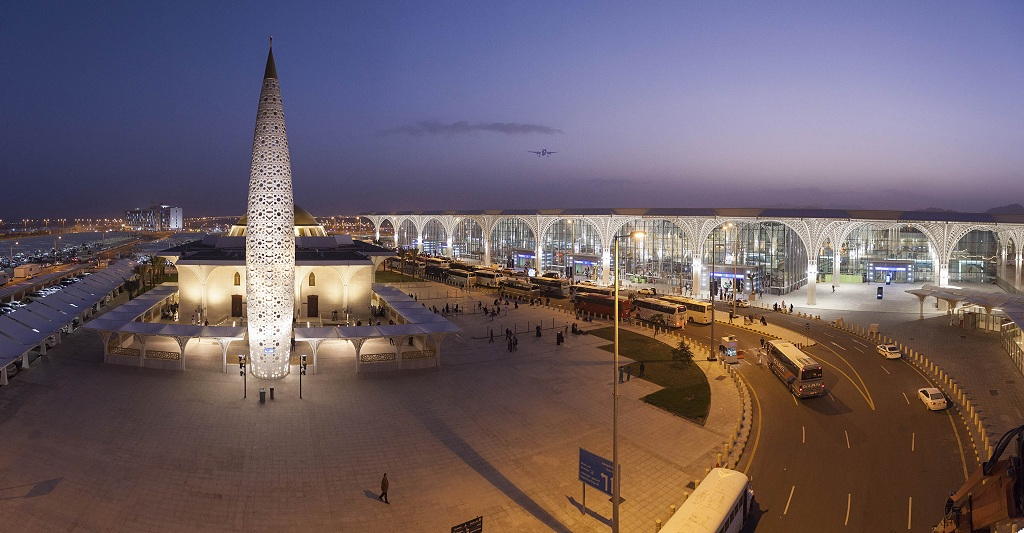
- IATA: MED; ICAO: OEMA

Summary
- Airport type: Public
- Owner: General Authority of Civil Aviation
- Operator: TAV Airports Holding
- Serves: Medina Province
- Location: Medina, Saudi Arabia
- Opened: 1950; 76 years ago
- Hub for: Saudia
- Elevation AMSL: 2,151 ft (656 m)
- Coordinates: 24°33′12″N 039°42′18″E
- Website: www.tibahairports.com

Maps
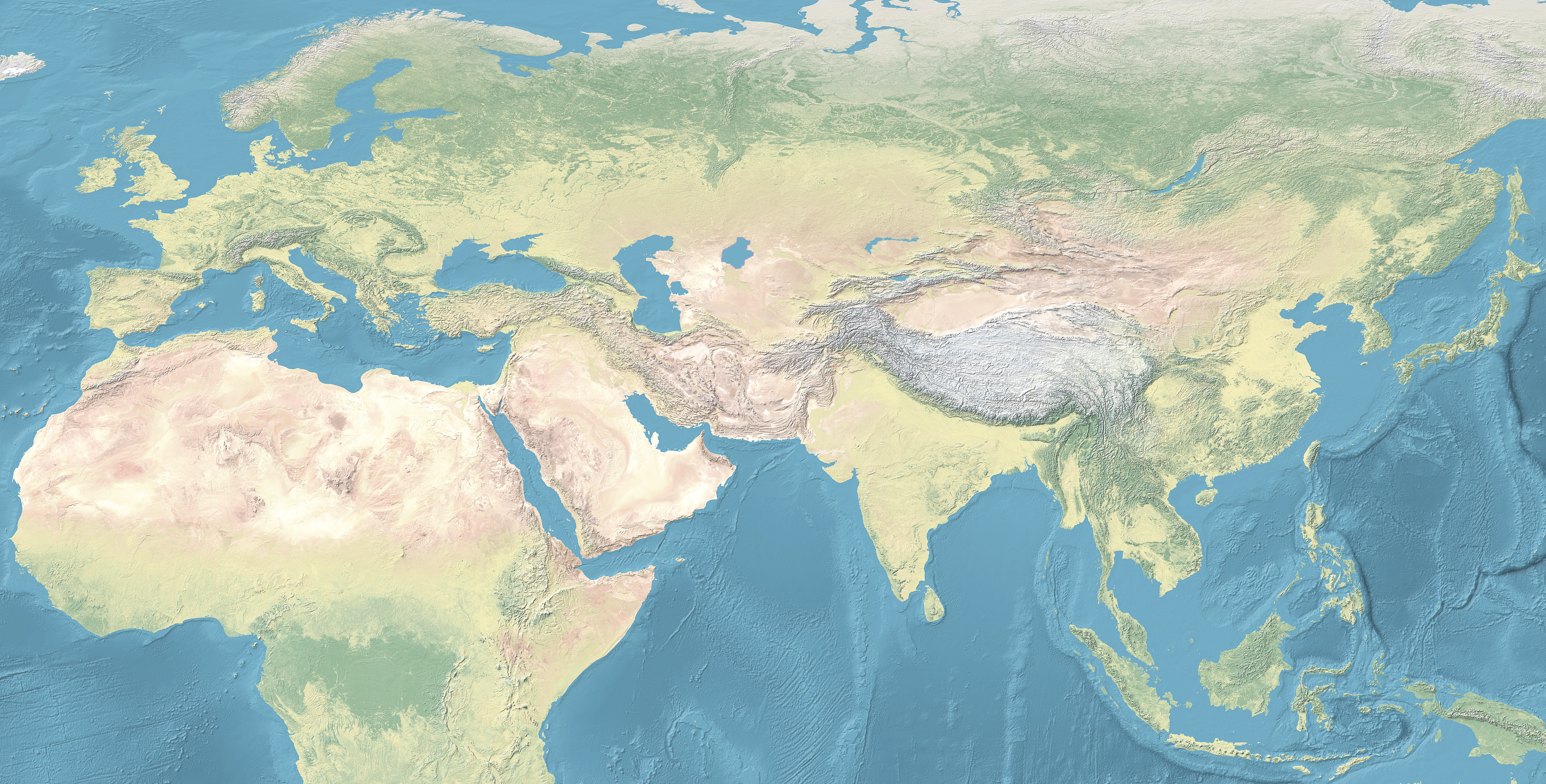
- Location of airport in Saudi Arabia MED (Middle East) MED (West and Central Asia) MED (Asia) MED (Eurasia) MED (Afro-Eurasia)
- Interactive map of Prince Mohammad bin Abdulaziz International Airport

Runways
Direction	Length		Surface
Direction	ft	m	Surface
17/35	14,222	4,335	Asphalt
18/36	10,007	3,050	Asphalt

Statistics (2018)
- Passengers: 8,144,790
- Air traffic movements: 60,665

Prince Mohammad bin Abdulaziz International Airport, more commonly known as Medina Airport (IATA: MED, ICAO: OEMA), is an airport located in Medina, Saudi Arabia. The airport accommodates charter international flights during the Hajj and Umrah seasons. Pilgrims may enter Saudi Arabia through this airport or through King Abdulaziz International Airport in Jeddah. It is the fourth-busiest airport in Saudi Arabia and the 18th busiest airport in the Middle East, handling 10,912,802 passengers in 2024. It is named in honor of Mohammad bin Abdulaziz, the first governor of the Medina Province.

== History ==
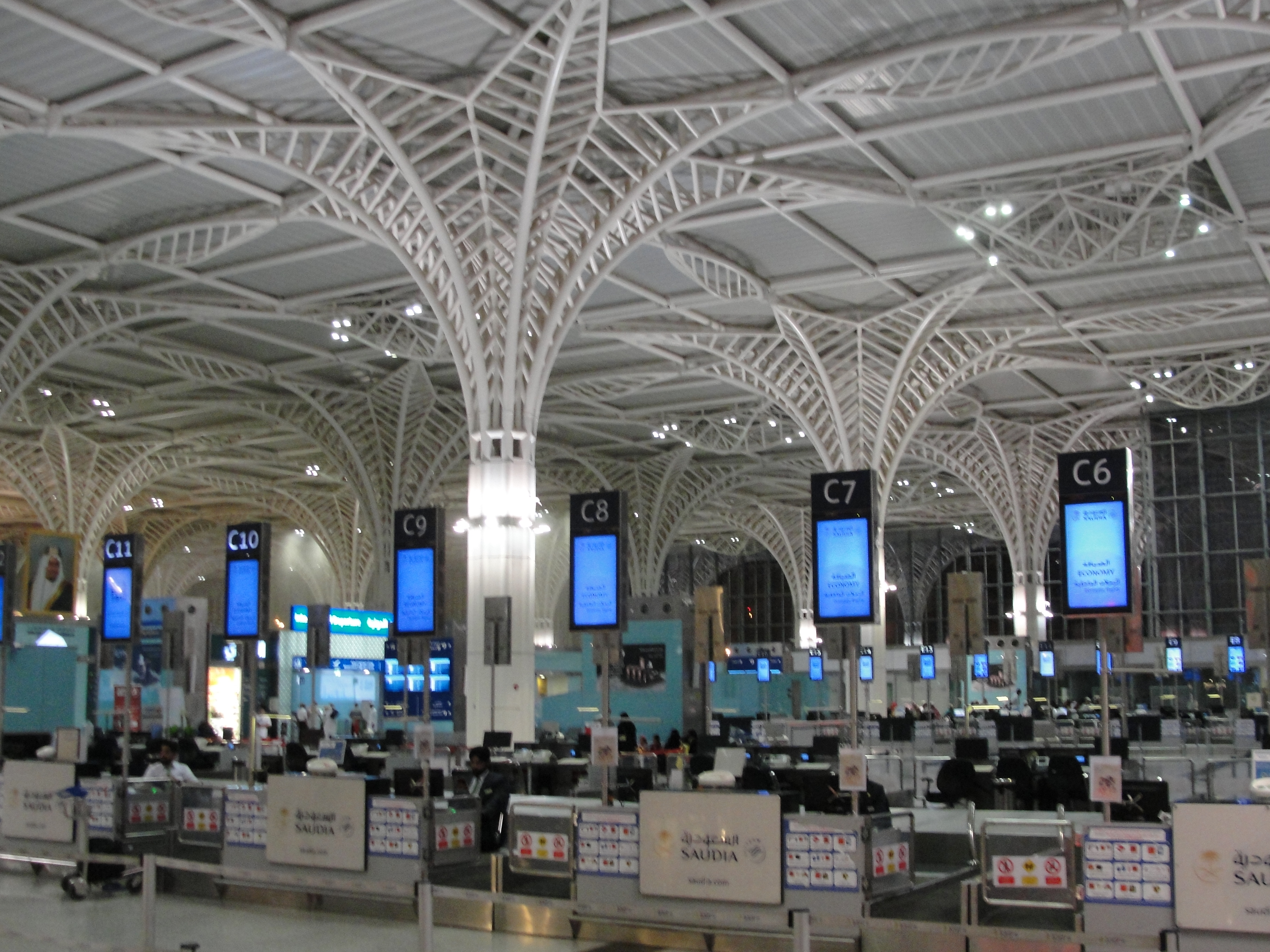
Check-in hall interior

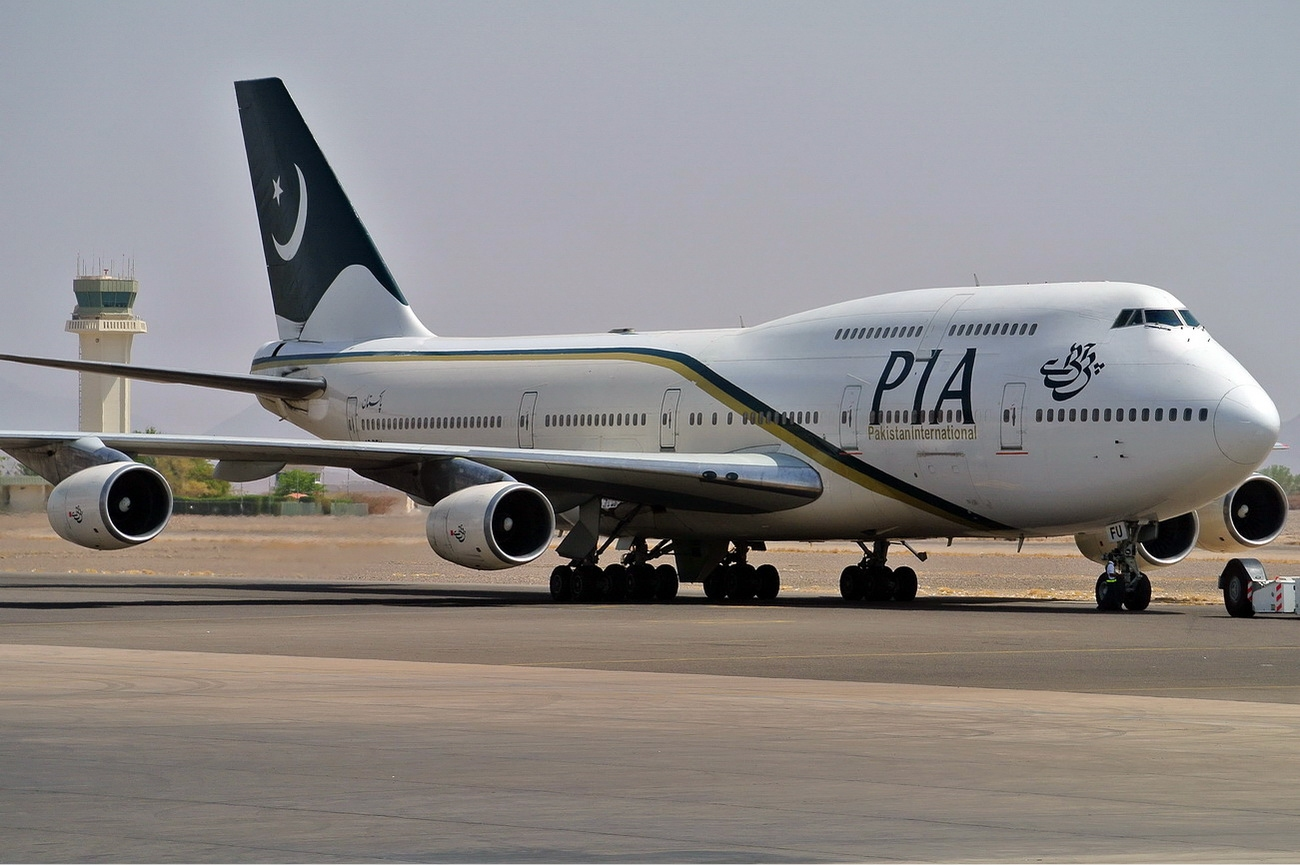
A Pakistan International Airlines Boeing 747-300

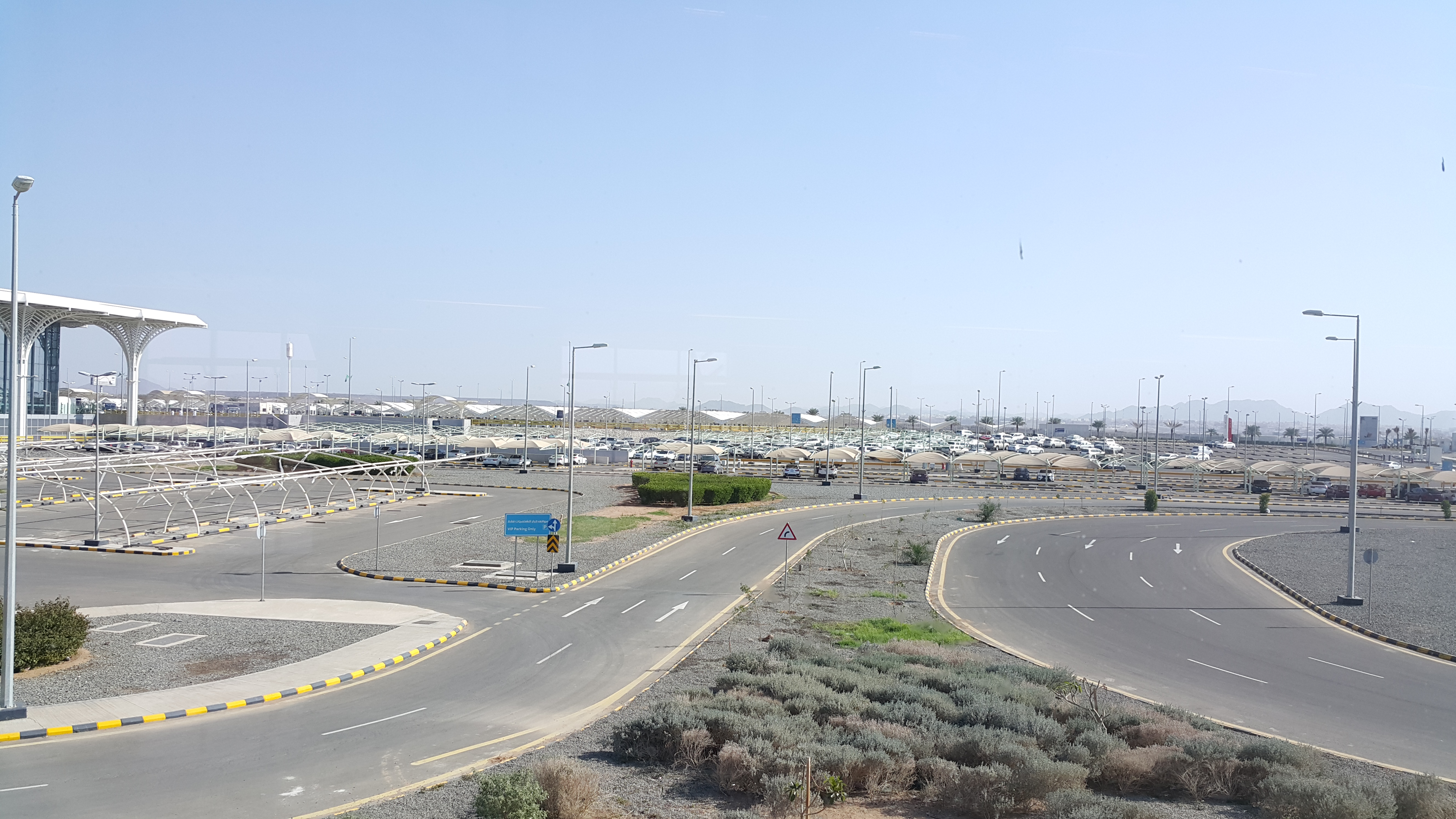
Parking area of airport

The original airport serving Medina dates back to the 1950s. By 1972, it operated with two runways: 18/36, which remains in use, and 15/33, which has since been decommissioned. Runway 15/33 was closed in 1986. Measuring roughly 8,000 feet, it was later converted into an apron based on historical imagery from Google Earth.

In 2007, the airport was granted international status after a consortium comprising TAV Airports Holding, Saudi Oger Limited, and Alrajhi Holding Group was selected to expand and operate the facility. In October 2011, the group signed a 25-year concession agreement with the General Authority of Civil Aviation (GACA) to redevelop and run Prince Mohammed bin Abdulaziz International Airport.

This concession represented Saudi Arabia’s first full public-private partnership (PPP) in the aviation sector. The initial construction cost totalled US$1.2 billion, with potential expansions raising the figure to US$1.5 billion. It was the largest transport infrastructure project to close in the GCC region in 2012. Funding came from National Commercial Bank, Arab National Bank, and Saudi British Bank through an Islamic financing structure consisting of a three-year US$436 million commodity Murabaha equity bridge, an 18-year US$719 million procurement facility, and a US$23 million working capital facility, largely denominated in Saudi Riyals (SAR).

The new terminal achieved Leadership in Energy and Environmental Design (LEED) Gold certification from the U.S. Green Building Council (USGBC), making Medina Airport the first commercial airport terminal in the Middle East and North Africa to achieve a LEED Gold rating. The project also received the Middle East Infrastructure Deal of the Year (2013) from Project Finance International Middle East & Africa Awards, and Best Islamic Finance Project Finance Deal of the Year (2013) from the Euromoney Islamic Finance Awards.

Test operations for the new Medina terminal began on 12 April 2015. A Saudia domestic flight from Riyadh, flight SV1435, landed at 11:00 a.m., becoming the first arrival at the upgraded facility. Flight SV1476 departed at 11:45 a.m., marking the first takeoff.

The new terminal complex was officially inaugurated by King Salman on 2 July 2015. Later that year, the project was named the world’s best airport development at Engineering News-Record's 3rd Annual Global Best Projects Competition, held on 10 September 2015. The airport is named after King Abdulaziz’s son, former Crown Prince and first governor of Medina Province, Mohammad bin Abdulaziz.

== Airlines and destinations ==
Airlines	Destinations
Air Arabia	Alexandria
Air Astana	Almaty
AJet	Istanbul–Sabiha Gökçen
Biman Bangladesh Airlines	Dhaka
Citilink	Seasonal: Makassar
Etihad Airways	Abu Dhabi
Flynas	Abha, Amman–City, Bahrain, Brussels, Cairo, Damascus (begins 19 November 2026), Dubai–International, Giza, Hofuf, Karachi, Pristina (begins 26 October 2026), Riyadh
Garuda Indonesia	Seasonal: Yogyakarta–International
IndiGo	Hyderabad, Mumbai
Jazeera Airways	Seasonal charter: Grozny
Lion Air	Seasonal: Medan
Malaysia Airlines	Kuala Lumpur–International
Nesma Airlines	Hail
Pakistan International Airlines	Multan, Sialkot
Pegasus Airlines	Istanbul–Sabiha Gökçen; Seasonal Trabzon
Philippine Airlines	Seasonal charter: Manila
Qatar Airways	Doha
SalamAir	Muscat
Saudia	Istanbul
SCAT Airlines	Seasonal: Almaty
Syrian Air	Damascus
Transavia	Lyon, Marseille, Paris–Orly, Toulouse
Turkish Airlines	Istanbul
Uzbekistan Airways	Seasonal: Samarqand

== Statistics ==
Years	Passengers	Movements
2011	▲3,547,508	▲32,935
2012	▲4,588,158	▲36,499
2013	▲4,669,181	▲40,000
2014	▲5,703,349	▲48,549
2015	▲5,831,163	▲49,031
2016	▲6,572,787	▲54,451
2017	▲7,805,295	▲58,045
2018	▲8,144,790	▲60,665
Source: TAV Investor Relations

== Accidents and incidents ==
- On 16 March 2001, the airport was the scene of a bloody end to the hijacking of a Russian-based Vnukovo Airlines Tupolev Tu-154 jet bound from Istanbul to Moscow carrying 162 passengers. The hijackers, apparently Chechen separatists, had landed at the airport and had demanded additional fuel to fly to Afghanistan. After 18 hours of no negotiations, Saudi Security forces stormed the plane, bringing an end to the hijack. There were three fatalities, including a hijacker, a Turkish passenger, and a Russian Air stewardess.
- On 5 January 2014, a Saudia Boeing 767-300, flight SV2841 from Mashhad, Iran made an emergency landing after one of its main landing gear failed to deploy. The aircraft was traveling from the Iranian city of Mashhad with 315 passengers on board. 29 people were injured as they exited the aircraft that was in a nose-up position, 11 were taken to hospital, and the rest were treated at the airport's medical center.

== See also ==
- List of airports in Saudi Arabia
- List of the busiest airports in the Middle East
