= Abdulhakim Al-Tamimi =

Saudi politician

Abdulhakim Mohammed Sulaiman Al Tamimi (Arabic: عبد الحكيم التميمي) is a Saudi politician. Since 17 June 2017, he has been the President and Minister of the General Authority of Civil Aviation. Prior to that, he served as Assistant Chairman of the Authority for Safety, Security and Air Transport at the General Authority of Civil Aviation and an Executive Member of the Council of the Arab Civil Aviation Authority.
