= Matarat Holding Company =

Saudi state-owned airport operator company

- شركة مطارات القابضة
- Formation: April 13, 2013; 13 years ago
- Type: State-owned enterprise
- Headquarters: Riyadh, Saudi Arabia
- Key people: Abdulaziz al-Duailej, Chairman; Mohammed Almowkley, CEO
- Parent organization: General Authority of Civil Aviation
- Subsidiaries: Riyadh Airports Company; Jeddah Airports Company; Dammam Airports Company; Cluster 2 Airports Company
- Website: www.matarat.com.sa
- Formerly called: Saudi Civil Aviation Holding Company (2013–2020)

Matarat Holding Company (Arabic: شركة مطارات القابضة), formerly the Saudi Civil Aviation Holding Company (SAVC) (Arabic: شركة الطيران المدني السعودي القابضة), is a Saudi Arabian state-owned closed joint-stock company based in Riyadh, Saudi Arabia that offers services in aviation management. Established in 2013 by the country's General Authority of Civil Aviation, it today operates all of Saudi Arabia's 29 civilian airports through its four wholly owned subsidiaries.

== History and background ==
The Saudi Civil Aviation Holding Company was established on 13 April 2013, through a decision of the Board of Directors of the General Authority of Civil Aviation. Its establishment was based on the Royal Decree No. (M / 78) dated 20 /11/1429 AH, corresponding to 18 November 2008 issued by King Abdullah, that allows privatization of Saudi Arabia's aviation sector under the General Authority of Civil Aviation.

In an interview with al-Eqtisadiah in September 2013, Prince Fahd bin Abdullah al-Saud, then president of the General Authority of Civil Aviation floated the idea of privatization of Saudi Arabia's international airports before 2022 while opening them up to investments.

In 2014, Okaz reported that the Saudi Civil Aviation Holding Company intends to privatize the King Khalid International Airport by September 2015. In March 2015, the General Authority of Civil Aviation established the Riyadh Airports Company as a wholly owned subsidiary of the Saudi Civil Aviation Company.

In November 2015, the General Authority of Civil Aviation announced that Saudi Arabia's international and domestic airports would soon be opening up to foreign investments and will be privatized by 2020, beginning from the first quarter of 2016. The decision came as a result of falling oil prices due to the rampant global oil glut that was affecting the country's economy as well as attempts to privatize government-owned assets. In July 2016, the responsibilities of King Khalid International Airport was transferred to Riyadh Airports Company.

In July 2017, the General Authority of Civil Aviation established the Dammam Airports Company as a subsidiary of the Saudi Civil Aviation Holding Company to operate the King Fahd International Airport, Al Ahsa International Airport and Al Qaisumah/Hafr al Batin Airport.

In 2020, the Saudi Civil Aviation Holding Company's rebranded itself as the Matarat Holding Company.

In 2021, Bloomberg reported that the Saudi government relaunched its privatization strategy after the General Authority of Civil Aviation announced transferring of all civilian airports in the country to Matarat Holding.

The General Authority of Civil Aviation and Matarat Holding established the Jeddah Airports Company to operate the King Abdulaziz International Airport and Cluster 2 Airports Company for the rest of civilian airports in early 2022. In November 2022, Abdulaziz al-Duailej, the head of General Authority of Civil Aviation hinted the possibility of trading the company on Tadawul, the Saudi Stock Exchange.

In 2024, Matarat and Egis were jointly recognized with the Global Project Excellence Award by the Project Management Institute (PMI).
