= Nasser Al Tayyar =

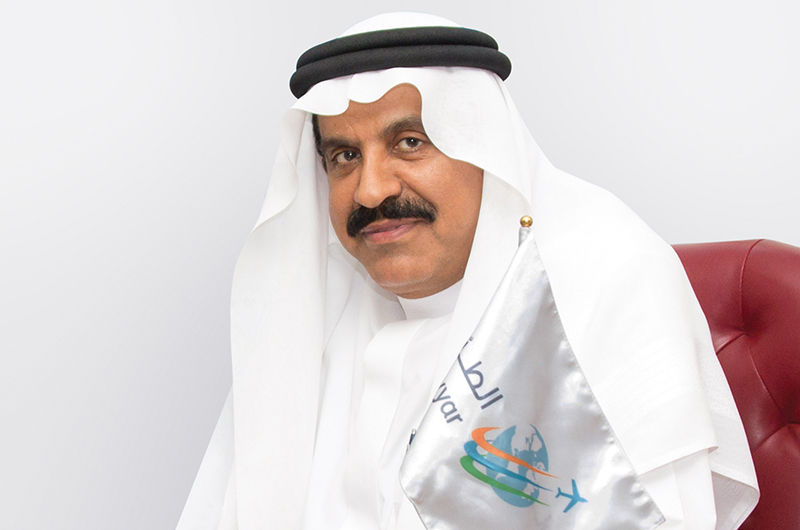
Nasser Al Tayyar

Nasser Al Tayyar (Arabic: د. ناصر بن عقيل عبد الله الطيار b. 1957) Is a Saudi businessman. He is the Founder and Deputy Chairman of Al Tayyar Travel Group. He has interests in many industries, including Leisure, Tourism, Education, Transport, Real Estate, Retail Trading, Hospitality, Aviation and Food and Beverages.

Al Tayyar is the President of Arab Publisher House and publisher of the leading business magazine, Forbes Middle East. He is a Member of the Board of Madina Press, one of the oldest publishers in the Middle East. Al Tayyar was ranked as one of the most influential Saudi figures from the private sector in the Tourism industry by Arabian Travel News, which compiled a list of the 50 most powerful figures within the Travel sector.

== Early life and education ==
Al Tayyar is the son of Aqeel Al Tayyar, hailing from the Saudi Arabian province of Zulfi.

== Career ==
In 1980, he launched the first Al Tayyar Group office in the business centre of Riyadh.

In 2008, he helped start Nile Air.

== Arrest ==
On 4 November 2017, Nasser Al Tayyar was arrested in Saudi Arabia in a "corruption crackdown" conducted by a new royal anti-corruption committee. This was done by the authority of Crown Prince Mohammad Bin Salman.

According to Bloomberg News, Al Tayyar carries a personal fortune of $600 million and is among the wealthiest of those arrested, which included Alwaleed bin Talal, ($19 billion), Mohammed Al Amoudi, ($10.1 billion), and Saleh Kamel, ($3.7 billion).

== Affiliations ==
Al Tayyar is an elite member of The World Tourism Organization, the Saudi Chambers Definition, International Congress and Convention Association, the GCC Commercial Arbitration Center, Ministry of Justice Saudi Arabia, and Consulting Member Saudi Commission for Tourism and Antiquities. He serves as chairman of the board at Nile Air, Egypt's second national carrier.

== Personal life ==
Al Tayyar is married and has 7 children.

== See also ==
- Nile Air
- Elegant Resorts
