= AlMasria Universal Airlines =

Egyptian private airline

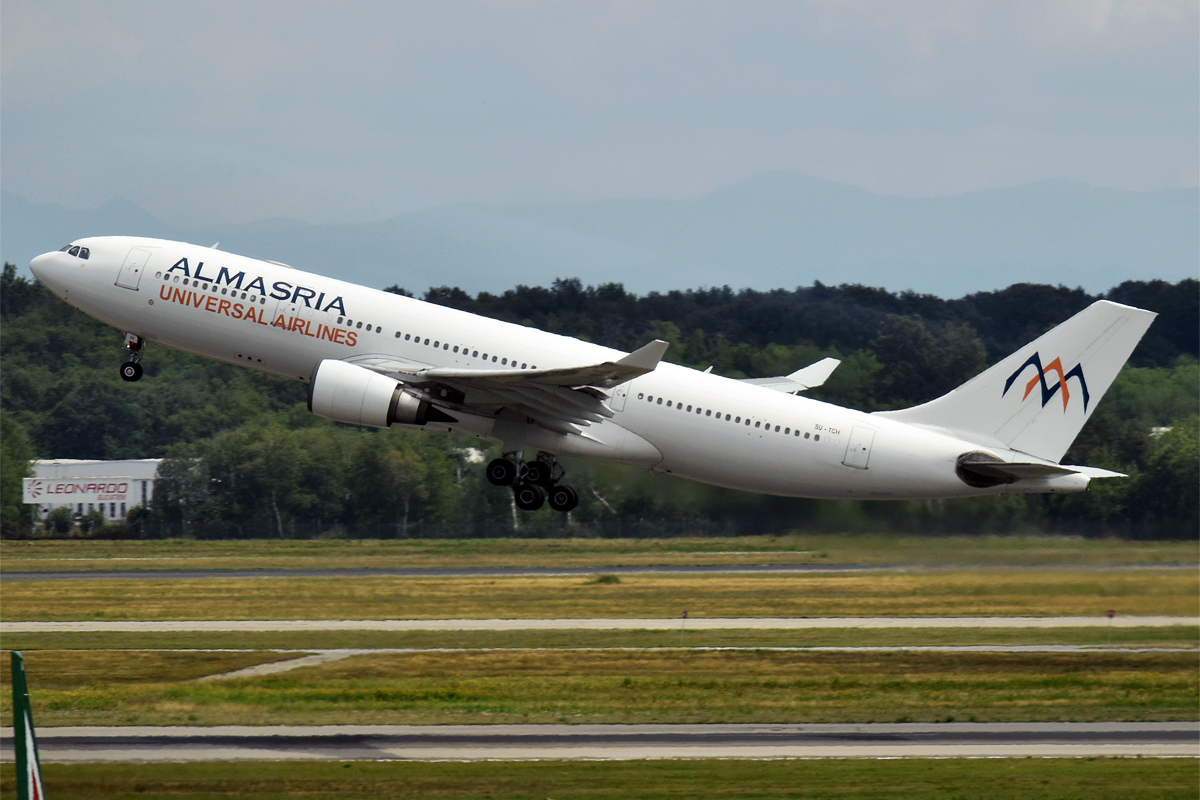
- AlMasria Universal Airlines Airbus A330-200
IATA	ICAO	Call sign
UJ	LMU	ALMASRIA
- Founded: 2008
- Hubs: Cairo International Airport
- Fleet size: 8
- Destinations: 5
- Headquarters: Cairo, Egypt
- Key people: Ahmed Ismail (Chairman); Ahmed Gadallah (President & CEO)
- Website: www.almasriaairlines.com

AlMasria Universal Airlines (Arabic: المصرية العالمية للطيران) is an Egyptian private airline. The airline operates scheduled and charter services from Egypt. 'AlMasria' is derived from the Arabic word for 'Egyptian'.

== Operations ==
Plans for AlMasria Universal Airlines were announced in 2008 and the airline launched operations in June 2009. In an interview in April 2009 the appointed company president and CEO, Hassan Aziz stated that the airline would launch operations in 2009 to take advantage of low prices during the 2008 financial crisis to tap demand for air travel in the most populous Arab country. The first aircraft arrived in Egypt in April 2009 and the second one in August 2009. Both aircraft are leased from BOC Aviation. The airline's CEO stated the plans call for a further 3 A320 will join during the first year of operation. An eventual fleet of 10 aircraft is planned by 2014. "We aim to dry-lease the first aircraft for the first three years", says Aziz. "After five years we aim to buy aircraft from Airbus by 2014. We don't want to load the balance sheet by buying $250 million in assets at the start."

In December 2009 the airline became the first international airline to operate flights to Saudi Arabia's Yanbu Airport. In June 2010 the airline repeated the milestone at Qassim Regional Airport. Previously both Yanbu and Qassim airports were domestic airports. Both flights originate from Cairo International Airport. The company also offers cargo services in the bellyhold of its passenger fleet. Maintenance is outsourced completely to Egyptair under a total service agreement, with the airline also training AlMasria flight crew and the technical team. Ground-handling will be through Egyptair, with passenger services undertaken by Egypt Aviation Services and catering by a new venture between Egyptair and Lufthansa's LSG Sky Chefs.

In 2017, the airline scaled back scheduled operations and resumed charter services and ACMI operations (including Tunis Air).

== Destinations ==
The AlMasria Universal Airlines route network consists of the following destinations:

Country	City	Airport	Notes
Egypt	Alexandria	Borg El Arab Airport	
Egypt	Cairo	Cairo International Airport	Hub
Egypt	Hurghada	Hurghada International Airport	
Egypt	Sharm El Sheikh	Sharm El Sheikh International Airport	Focus city
Italy	Milan	Orio al Serio International Airport	
Italy	Parma	Parma Giuseppe Verdi Airport	
Russia	Chelyabinsk	Balandino Airport	Seasonal charter
Russia	Kaliningrad	Khrabrovo Airport	Seasonal charter
Russia	Kazan	Ğabdulla Tuqay Kazan International Airport	Seasonal charter
Russia	Krasnodar	Krasnodar International Airport	Seasonal charter
Russia	Orenburg	Yuri Gagarin Orenburg International Airport	Seasonal charter
Russia	Perm	Bolshoye Savino Airport	Seasonal charter
Russia	Saint Petersburg	Pulkovo Airport	Seasonal charter
Russia	Tyumen	Roshchino Airport	Seasonal charter
Russia	Volgograd	Gumrak Airport	Seasonal charter
Saudi Arabia	Al-Qassim Region	Prince Nayef bin Abdulaziz International Airport	
Saudi Arabia	Jeddah	King Abdulaziz International Airport	
Saudi Arabia	Ta'if	Ta'if Regional Airport	
Saudi Arabia	Tabuk	Tabuk Regional Airport	
Saudi Arabia	Yanbu	Yanbu Airport	
Turkey	Istanbul	Istanbul Airport	

== Fleet ==
=== Current fleet ===
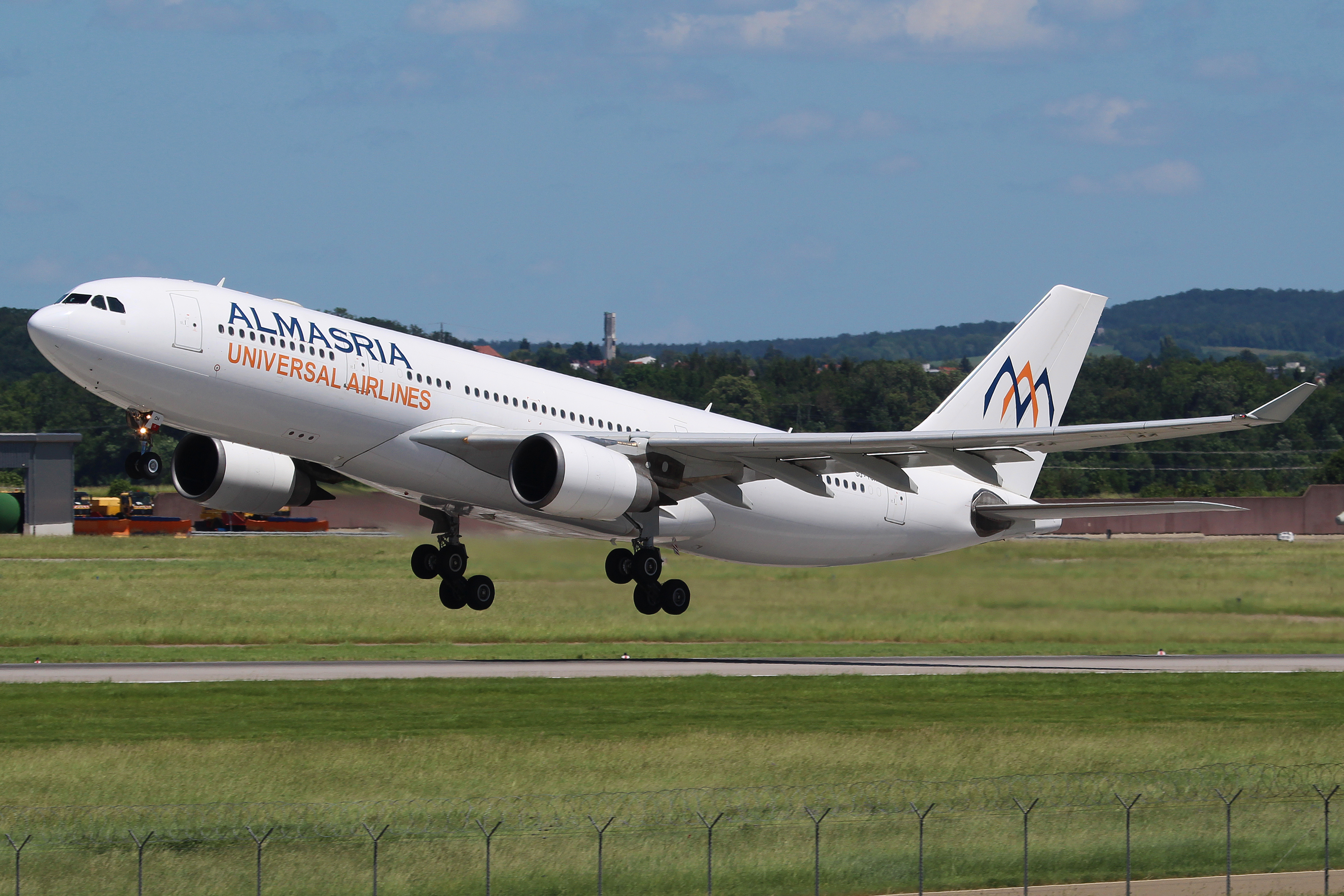
AlMasria Universal Airlines Airbus A330-200

As of July 2026, AlMasria Universal Airlines operates the following aircraft:

AlMasria Universal Airlines fleet
Aircraft	In service	Orders	Passengers			Notes
Aircraft	In service	Orders	C	Y	Total	Notes
Airbus A320	2	—	—	177	177	
Airbus A321	4	—	—	—	—	
Boeing 737-400	2	—	—	168	168	
Total	8	—				

=== Former fleet ===
The following aircraft were previously operated by the airline:

- 1 Airbus A330-200
- 1 Boeing 737-500
