= Elegant Resorts =

British travel agency, 1988–2014

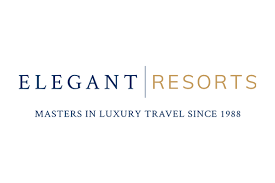
- Company type: Wholly owned subsidiary
- Industry: Travel
- Founded: 1988
- Headquarters: Chester, England
- Services: Luxury Travel

Elegant Resorts is a luxury travel retailer based in Chester, England. The company was founded in 1988 in Chester by Geoff Moss and Barbara Catchpole.

The company was sold to Al Tayyar, a global travel group, in 2014 for a reported £14.3 million. Al Tayyar is now known as the Seera Group.

== Background ==
Elegant Resorts is located in Cheshire and founded in 1988.

The company was acquired by Thomas Cook Group in April, 2008 for an undisclosed sum. In February 2014, it was sold for £14.3 million to Al Tayyar, a global travel group based in Saudi Arabia. Al Tayyar is now known as the Seera Group.

In 2018, Lisa Fitzell was named as managing director for Elegant Resorts. She joined the business with 30 years’ experience in the travel industry, most recently as group managing director of Diethelm Travel's Asian businesses based in Bangkok.

Lisa Fitzell announced that she would be stepping down from her role as managing director of Elegant Resorts in February 2025 after 8 years at the helm of the business. She has been replaced by Gordon McCreadie who had previously served as General Manager for the group.

== Recognition ==
In 2010, Elegant Resorts was recognised by The Sunday Times as the Favourite Luxury Tour Operator in their Travel Reader Awards. In 2011, the company won the Best Small Tour Operator in the UK as part of The Ultratravel 100.

== Space Travel ==
Elegant Resorts was selected by Virgin Galactic in 2007 to sell its space experience, which led to the company becoming the Accredited Space agent for the UK.
