= Hanadi Zakaria al-Hindi =

Saudi Arabian aviator

Hanadi Zakaria al-Hindi هنادي زكريا الهندي
- Born: September 1978 (age 47); Mecca, Saudi Arabia
- Occupation: Aviator

Hanadi Zakaria al-Hindi (Arabic: هنادي زكريا الهندي) is the first Saudi woman to become a pilot.

== Biography ==
She was born in Mecca in September 1978. She passed her final exams at the Middle East Academy for Commercial Aviation in Amman, Jordan on 15 June 2005. She worked a ten-year contract with Prince Al-Waleed bin Talal’s Kingdom Holding Company as a pilot of his private jet, the Kingdom.

After her early flying work with Prince Al‑Waleed bin Talal, she went to the U.S. to complete additional training with the Federal Aviation Administration. Despite her certification, she was unable to find work as a commercial pilot within Saudi Arabia, and currently teaches aviation.

== Recognitions ==
Al-Waleed, who is considered a proponent for female emancipation in the Saudi world, financed her training and stated on her graduation that he is "in full support of Saudi ladies working in all fields". Al-Hindi became certified to fly within Saudi Arabia in 2014.

Reports highlighted the irony that a Saudi woman is allowed to pilot an aeroplane but may not drive a car (although this changed in 2017). Al-Hindi, however, does not see this as a contradiction.

== See also ==
- History of women in aviation in Saudi Arabia
