= Nile Air =

Egyptian airline

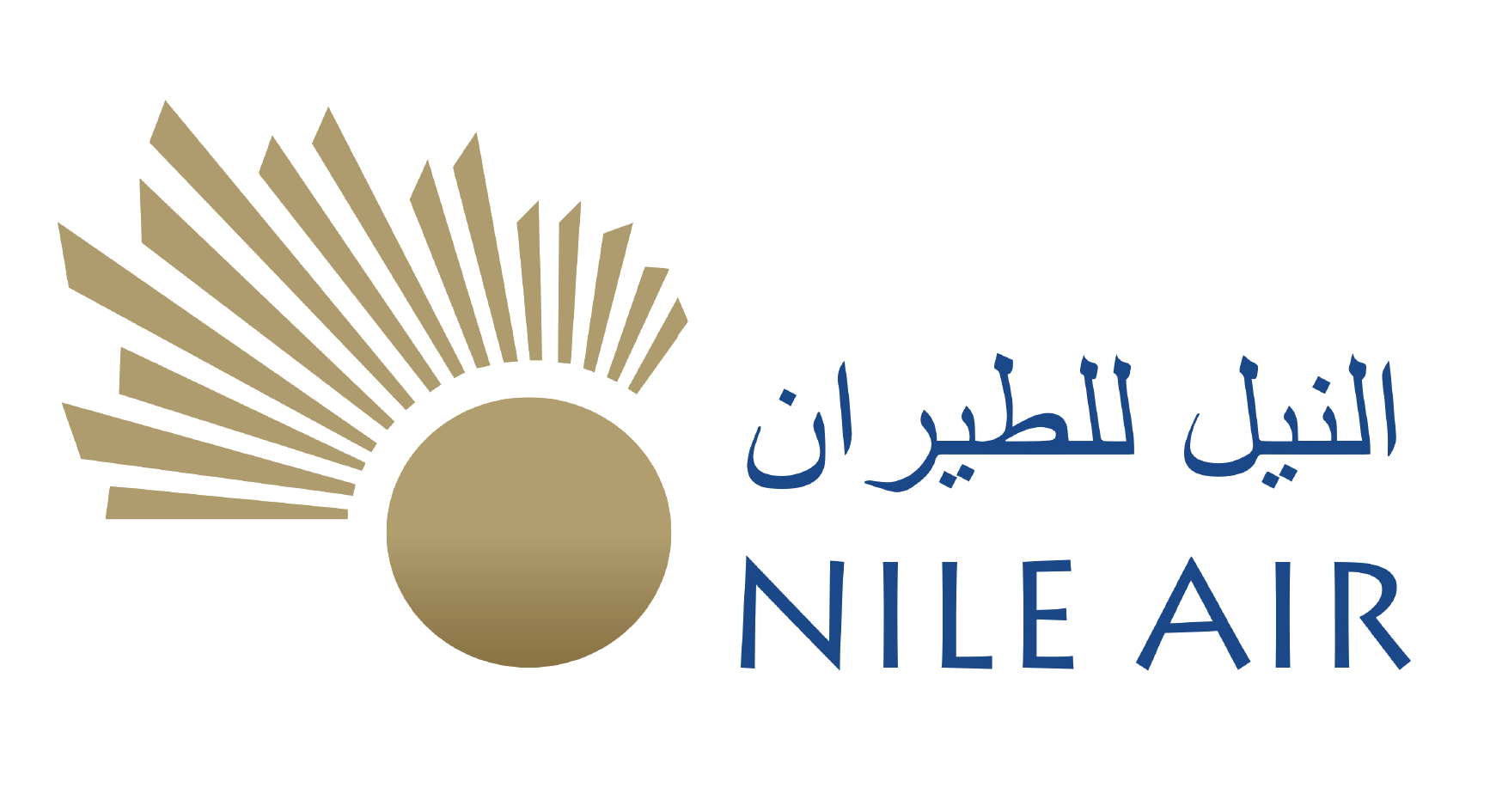

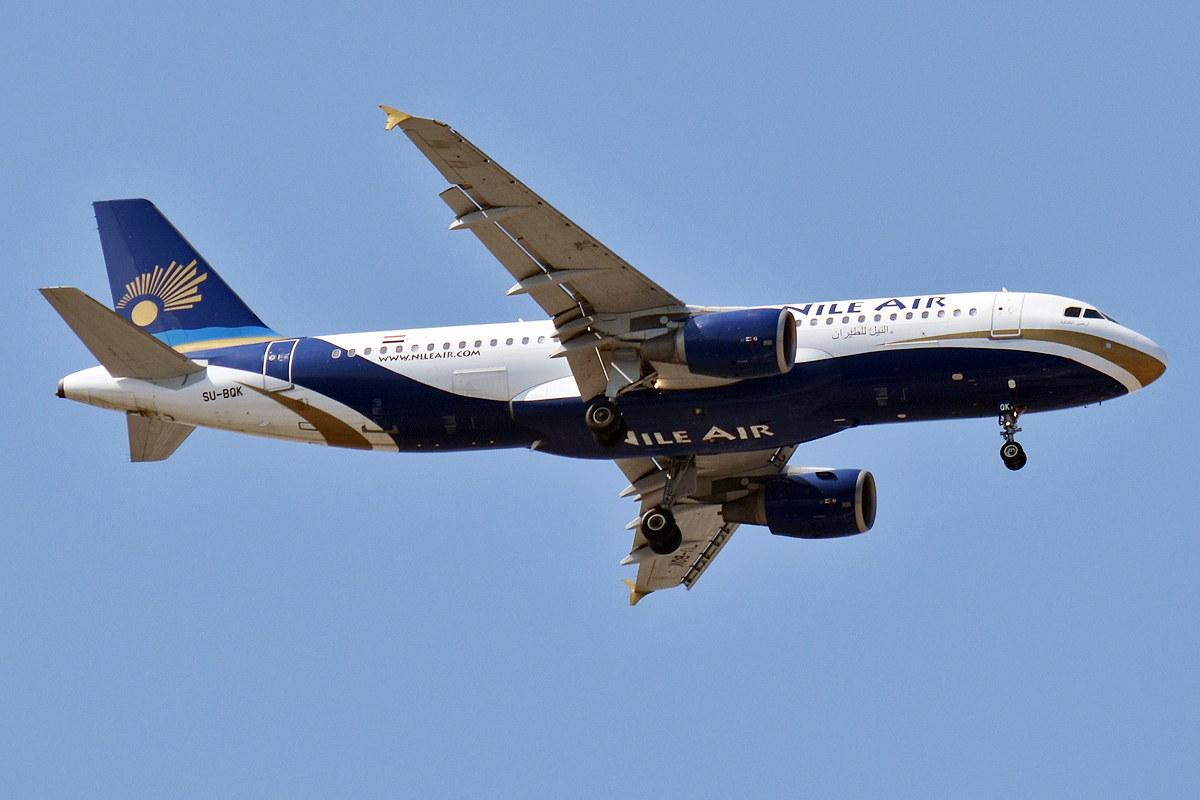
- Nile Air Airbus A320-214
IATA	ICAO	Call sign
NP	NIA	NILE BIRD
- Founded: 2006
- Commenced operations: March 2011
- Hubs: Cairo International Airport
- Fleet size: 7
- Destinations: 23
- Headquarters: Cairo, Egypt
- Website: nileair.com

Nile Air (Arabic: النيل للطيران) is an Egyptian airline based at Cairo International Airport that operates scheduled services to destinations in Egypt and the Middle East, the Persian Gulf, Southern Europe, Asia and Africa. Nile Air is the largest private airline in Egypt and the second largest overall, being surpassed by only Egyptair. It is a full-service carrier (with business and economy class services) that operates scheduled services, using a fleet of Airbus A320-200s & Airbus A321-200s.

== History ==
On 1 November 2009, the airline received its Air operator's certificate (AOC) from the Egyptian Civil Aviation Authority, which permitted the airline to launch operations. The airline had ordered nine Airbus A321-200 aircraft in 2007, however in 2015 this order was adjusted to two aircraft. It launched operations in August 2010, operating a short-term wet lease contract with Libyan Arab Airlines, before starting scheduled services from Egypt in March 2011, with the launch of flights to Saudi Arabia.

In January 2011, the airline became the first private Egyptian airline to publish its schedule and flight availability on the Global Distribution System (GDS) and is now covered on all 3 GDS systems; Amadeus, Sabre Corporation & Travelport.

Also in 2016, the airline became the first airline in the Middle East to use Amadeus’ complete Airline IT portfolio, which provides end-to-end IT solutions. In June 2016, Nile Air and Lila Design worked together on the Nile Air A320 special 'Egypt Tourism' livery which was unveiled on an Airbus A320 (SU-BQM).

In 2017, the airline became the official airline of the Egypt national football team - the first deal of its kind. In addition, the airline is among the main sponsors of the team.

== Corporate affairs ==
=== Ownership ===
Nile Air is an Egyptian Joint Stock Company established in 2008, with 60% ownership by Egyptian individuals & companies and the remaining 40% by Dr. Nasser Al Tayyar, former President of Al Tayyar Group (now called Seera), a prominent travel agency based in Kingdom of Saudi Arabia with operations in over 15 countries. Nile Air is shown in the accounts of the Al Tayyar Travel Holding Company as a 'related company'.

There have been several press reports in recent years that the airline was looking to go public on the Egyptian Stock Exchange, with as much as 30% of the carrier's stock being offered to Egyptian investors, with the owner and founder Nasser Al Tayyar retaining a 40% stake.

=== Business trends ===
Nile Air is a private company, and annual reports are not published. In the absence of these, limited information on financial trends especially, is available. Available figures are shown below (for years ending 31 December):

	2013	2014	2015	2016	2017	2018
Turnover						n/a
Profits						n/a
Number of employees				665	762	770
Number of passengers (m)	0.35			0.93	1.36	1.04
Passenger load factor (%)				66.9	68.5	70
Number of aircraft (at year end)	2	4	4	6	7	7
Notes/sources						

=== Head office ===
The airline's head office is located opposite Cairo International Airport's Terminal 1 in Cairo, Egypt.

== Destinations ==
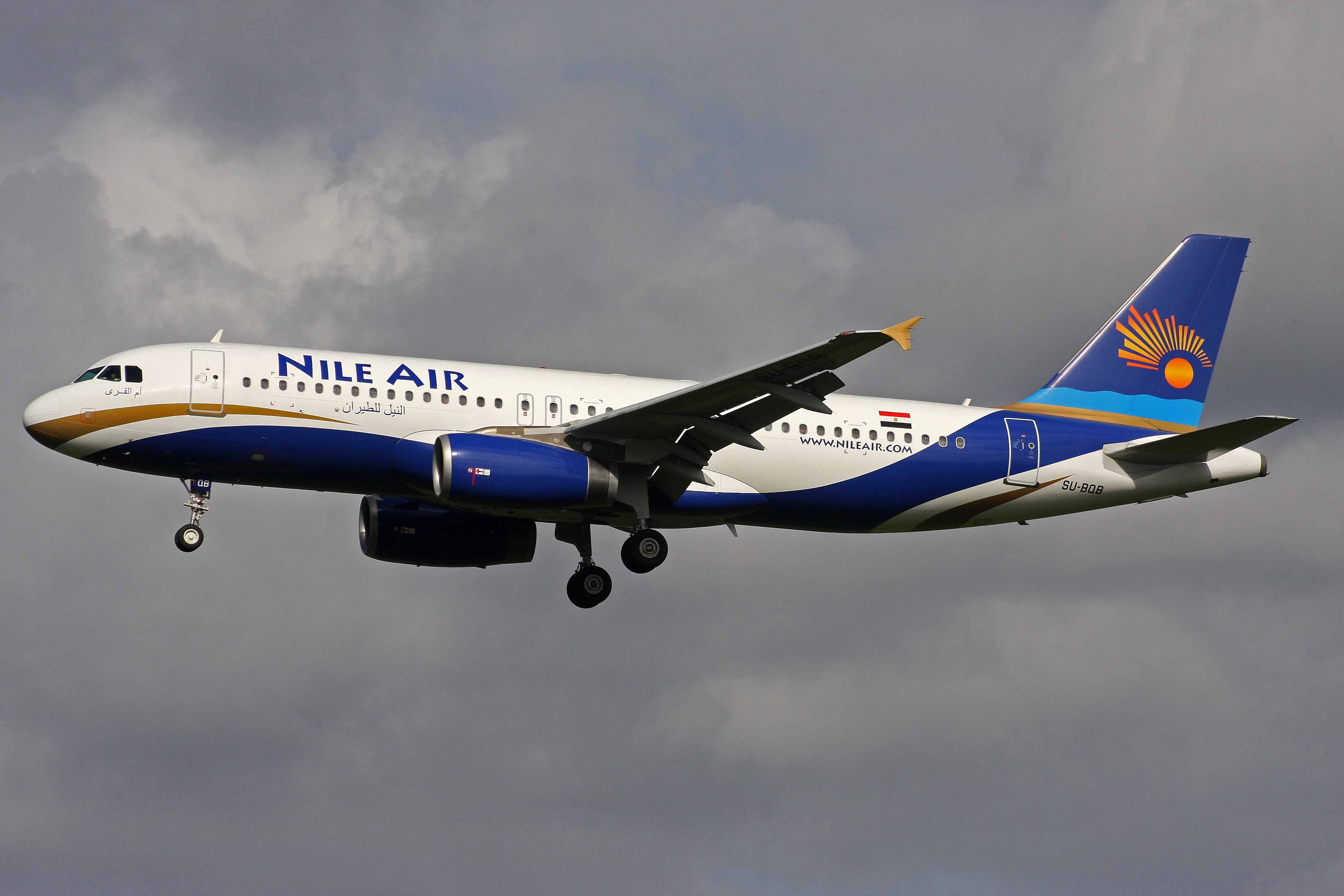
A Nile Air Airbus A320-200

As of April 2025, Nile Air serves the following destinations with scheduled services:

Country	City	Airport	Notes	Refs
Egypt	Aswan	Aswan International Airport		
Egypt	Cairo	Cairo International Airport	Hub	
Egypt	Hurghada	Hurghada International Airport		
Egypt	Luxor	Luxor International Airport		
Egypt	Sharm El Sheikh	Sharm El Sheikh International Airport		
Germany	Cologne	Cologne Bonn Airport		
Iraq	Baghdad	Baghdad International Airport		
Italy	Bergamo	Milan Bergamo Airport		
Kuwait	Kuwait City	Kuwait International Airport		
Saudi Arabia	Arar	Arar Domestic Airport		
Saudi Arabia	Sakakah	Al Jouf International Airport		
Saudi Arabia	Buraidah	Prince Naif bin Abdulaziz International Airport		
Saudi Arabia	Ha'il	Ha'il Regional Airport		
Saudi Arabia	Jeddah	King Abdulaziz International Airport		
Saudi Arabia	Jizan	Jizan Regional Airport		
Saudi Arabia	Sakakah	Al Jouf Airport		
Saudi Arabia	Ta’if	Taif International Airport		
Saudi Arabia	Tabuk	Tabuk Regional Airport		
Saudi Arabia	Yanbu	Yanbu Airport		
Sudan	Port Sudan	Port Sudan New International Airport		
Sweden	Stockholm	Stockholm Arlanda Airport		
Turkey	Istanbul	Istanbul Airport		
United Arab Emirates	Al Ain	Al Ain International Airport		
United Arab Emirates	Sharjah	Sharjah International Airport		
Uzbekistan	Tashkent	Tashkent International Airport		

== Fleet ==
=== Current fleet ===
As of July 2026, Nile Air operates the following aircraft:

Nile Air Fleet
Aircraft	In Service	Orders	Passengers			Notes
Aircraft	In Service	Orders	C	Y	Total	Notes
Airbus A320-200	5	—	8	156	164	
Airbus A321-200	2	—		196	204	
Airbus A321neo	—	2	TBA			Aircraft deliveries in 2026
Airbus A321XLR	—	4	TBA			Aircraft deliveries in 2026
Total	7	6				

=== Former fleet ===
As of August 2025, Nile Air operated 4 Airbus A320 and 2 Airbus A321.
