= Prince Naif bin Abdulaziz International Airport =

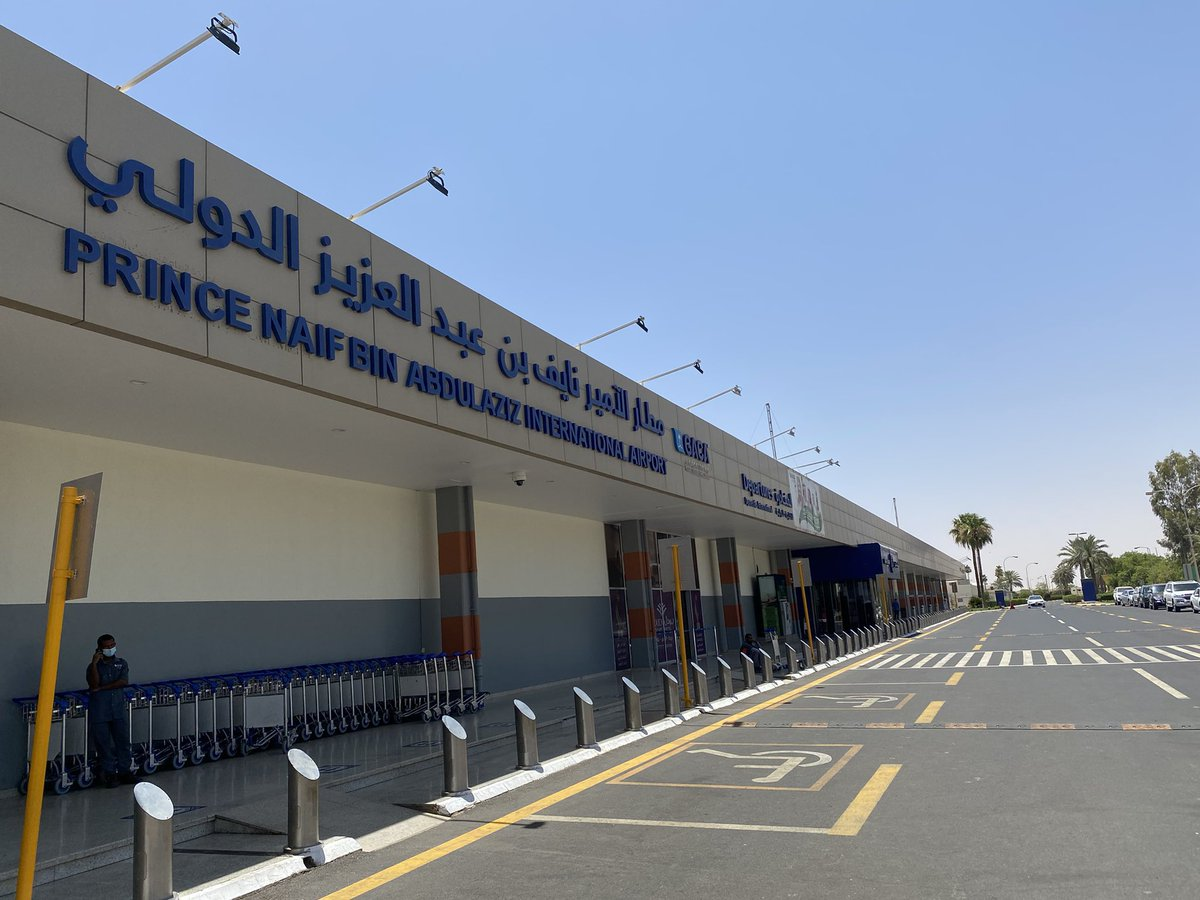
- IATA: ELQ; ICAO: OEGS

Summary
- Airport type: Public
- Operator: Matarat Holding Company
- Serves: Al-Qassim Province
- Location: Buraidah, Saudi Arabia
- Elevation AMSL: 2,126 ft (648 m)
- Coordinates: 26°18′10″N 043°46′26″E
- Website: www.matarat.com.sa

Map
- Location of airport in Saudi Arabia

Runways
| Direction | Length | | Surface |
| Direction | ft | m | Surface |
|---|---|---|---|
| 15/33 | 9,843 | 3,000 | Asphalt |

Prince Naif bin Abdulaziz International Airport (Arabic: مطار الأمير نايف بن عبدالعزيز الدولي) (IATA: ELQ, ICAO: OEGS), formerly Qassim International Airport, is an international airport serving Buraidah, Saudi Arabia. Located in Buraidah and named after the former Crown Prince Nayef bin Abdulaziz, it primarily serves the northern provinces of the kingdom. International routes are limited to 9 countries: the United Arab Emirates, Egypt, Bahrain, Azerbaijan (seasonal), Bosnia and Herzegovina (seasonal), Qatar, Kuwait, Pakistan, and Turkey. The airport is owned and operated by the Matarat Holding Company.

== History ==
Established in 1964, It was renamed Prince Naif bin Abdulaziz International Airport by royal decree by King Abdullah on 5 July 2012 in memory of former Crown Prince Naif who died in June 2012.

Prince Sultan, then crown prince and minister of defense and aviation, launched an expansion project of the royal terminal at the airport in 2003. GACA has spent more than SR300 million on expansion projects since 1964, and the airport continues to undergo further expansion as it consolidates its position as a main aviation hub in Saudi Arabia's central region.

In October 2026, Saudia and Riyadh Air temporarily moved several flights from King Khalid International Airport to Al Qassim, due to operational restrictions at King Khalid following missile and drone attacks by the Houthis. Both carriers arranged complimentary bus service to carry passengers on the 375 km drive between Al Qassim and Riyadh.

== Airlines and destinations ==
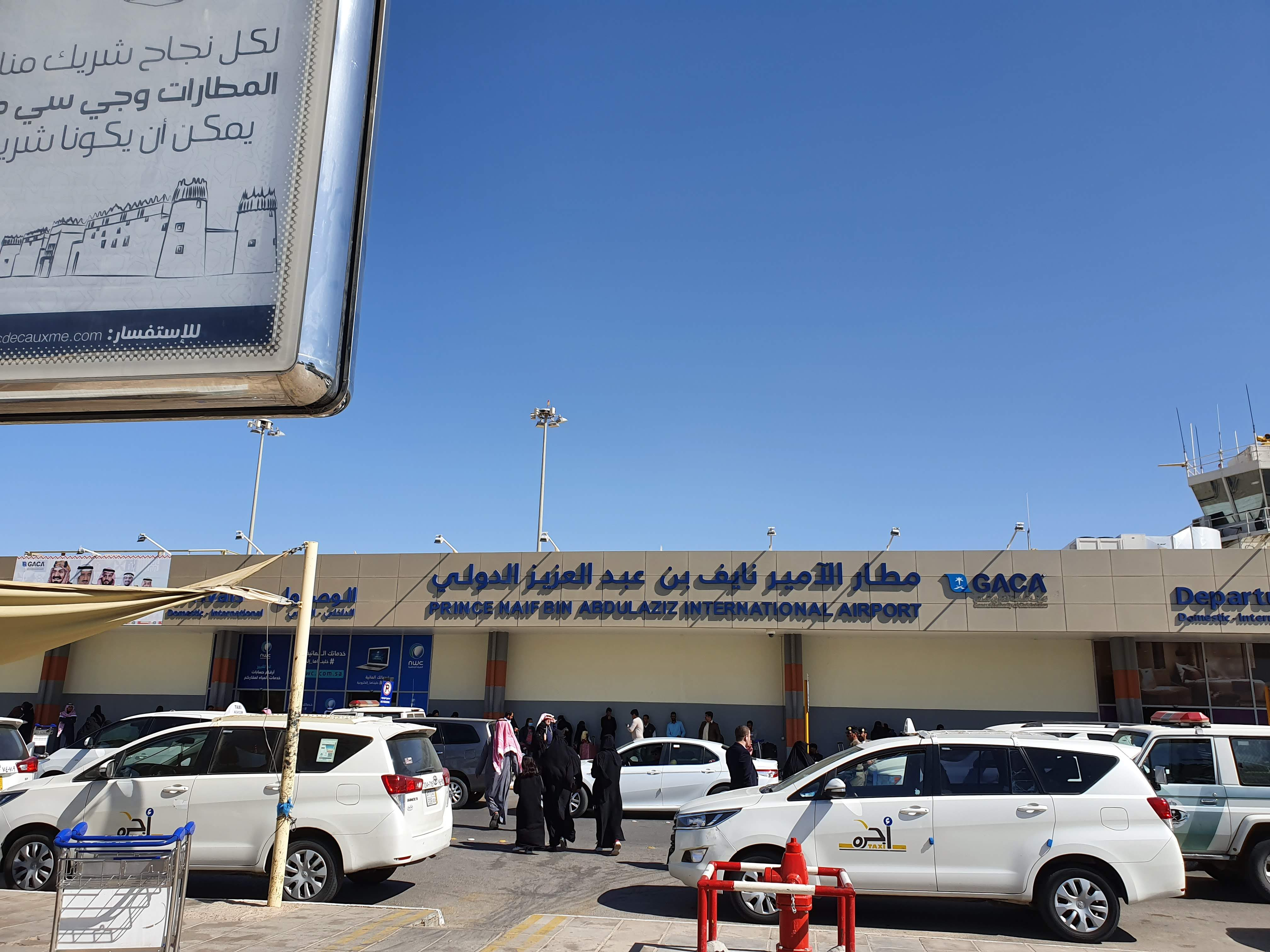

| Airlines | Destinations |
|---|---|
| Air Arabia | Cairo, Sharjah, Sohag |
| Air Cairo | Assiut, Cairo, Sohag |
| AlMasria Universal Airlines | Cairo |
| Egyptair | Cairo |
| Etihad Airways | Abu Dhabi |
| Flyadeal | Dammam, Jeddah; Seasonal: Sarajevo, Trabzon |
| Flydubai | Dubai–International |
| Flynas | Abha, Dammam, Jeddah, Istanbul–Sabiha Gökçen |
| Gulf Air | Bahrain |
| Jazeera Airways | Kuwait City |
| Nesma Airlines | Cairo, Ha'il |
| Nile Air | Cairo, Sohag |
| Pakistan International Airlines | Islamabad, Multan |
| Qatar Airways | Doha |
| Riyadh Air | Cairo, Dhaka, Jeddah, Islamabad, Lahore |
| Saudia | Dubai–International, Jeddah, Riyadh |
| Turkish Airlines | Istanbul; Seasonal: Rize |

== Incidents and accidents ==
- On 28 May 2005, three military helicopters parked in the airport caught fire, also damaging the buildings next to the hangar. There were no human casualties.

== See also ==
- List of airports in Saudi Arabia
