= Kingdom Holding Company =

Saudi conglomerate holding company

- Native name: شركة المملكة القابضة
- Type: Joint-stock company
- Traded as: Tadawul: 4280
- ISIN: SA31RG522S19
- Founded: 1980; 46 years ago
- Headquarters: Riyadh, Saudi Arabia
- Key people: Prince Alwaleed Bin Talal (Chairman); Eng. Talal Ibrahim Al Maiman (CEO)
- Revenue: 1,759,917,000 Saudi riyal (2019)
- Operating income: 2,498,508,000 Saudi riyal (2023)
- Net income: 988,243,000 Saudi riyal (2023)
- AUM: US$ 13.6 billion (2022)
- Total assets: 54,098,335,000 Saudi riyal (2023)
- Owner: Al-Waleed bin Talal (78.13%); Public Investment Fund (16.87%)
- Website: www.kingdom.com.sa

The Kingdom Holding Company (KHC; Arabic: شركة المملكة القابضة) is a Saudi holding company, based in Riyadh and listed on the Saudi stock exchange.

KHC's founder and chairman is Prince Al-Waleed bin Talal, while Engineer Talal Ibrahim Al Maimand is chief executive officer.

== Investments ==
The company's investments are spread in financial services, real estate, tourism and hospitality, media, entertainment, petrochemicals, aviation and technology.

Current investments include:

- Four Seasons Hotels & Resorts (Canada-based) (owns 23.75% with Cascade Investment, LLC, and others)
- Fairmont Raffles Swissotel (minority ownership with Accor)
- Hotel George V (100%) (France)
- National Industrialization Company (100%) (Saudi Arabia)
- Rotana Group (Arabic: روتانا), entertainment company (100%) (Saudi Arabia)
- xAI (minority stake)

KHC had previously invested in 21st Century Fox (US / 6% minority stake, sold in 2017); 360buy (China / now publicly traded as JD.com); Amazon (US); AOL / Time Warner (US); Apple (US); Canary Wharf (UK); Euro Disney S.A.S. (France / now owned by The Walt Disney Company on an 87.15%; Mövenpick Hotels & Resorts (Switzerland / 33% minority stake, sold in 2018 to Accor); X Corp. (US / minority stake, now owned by xAI); and in many others.

== Other endeavors ==
The company hired the first Saudi female commercial pilot, Captain Hanadi Zakaria al-Hindi, who trained at the Mideast Aviation Academy in Jordan.
