= Fahd bin Abdullah Al Saud =

Saudi royal and military officer (born 1948)

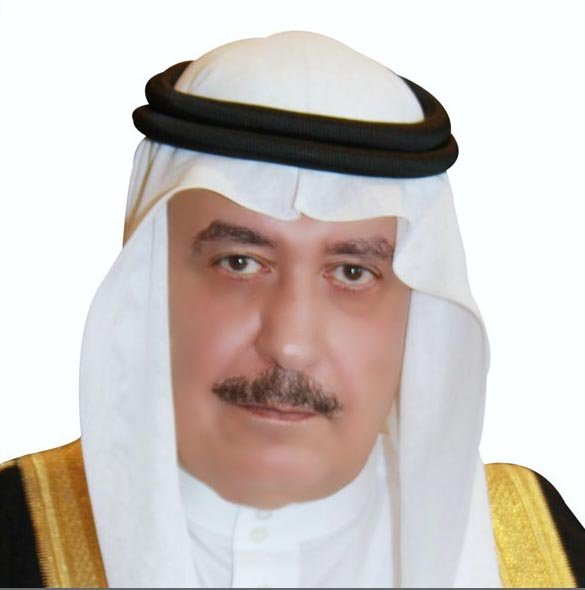
- Prince Fahd bin Abdullah
- Born: 3 January 1948 (age 78); Mecca, Saudi Arabia
Names
- Fahd bin Abdullah bin Mohammed bin Saud Al Kabeer
- House: House of Saud
- Father: Abdullah bin Mohammed
- Mother: Seeta bint Abdulaziz

Fahd bin Abdullah Al Saud (Arabic :الأمير فهد بن عبدالله بن محمد آل سعود; born 3 January 1948) is a Saudi royal and former military officer who is a member of Al Kabir family, a cadet branch of House of Saud.

== Early life and education ==
Fahd bin Abdullah was born in Mecca on 3 January 1948. His parents are Abdullah bin Mohammed bin Saud Al Saud Al Kabir and Seeta bint Abdulaziz Al Saud. Fahd's father, Abdullah, was Mohammed bin Saud Al Kabir's son. Princess Seeta, who died on 2011, was the sister of late King Abdullah. Prince Fahd has four blood siblings: Turki, Bandar, Noura and Nouf and a step sister, Al Jawhara.

Prince Fahd had received his primary and secondary education at the Capital Institute in Riyadh. After advanced education in English in the United Kingdom, he joined the Royal Saudi Air Force (RSAF), where he received pilot training followed by tactical training in the U.S. He graduated from the U.S. Air Force Command and Staff College. In 1965 he also completed T33 jet qualification training in Randolph Air Force Base.

== Career ==
As a squadron commander, he oversaw the introduction of the F-5 fighter into the RSAF. In 1975 he was appointed Director of Operations in HQ RSAF, rising to the rank of Brigadier General in 1982.

As Director of Air Operations, he oversaw the introduction of the F-15 fighter, AWACS as well as an extensive command, control and communication system. He thus made a significant contribution towards the modernization of this highly capable air force.

Prince Fahd's overall objective was to create a self-sufficient fighting force. To demonstrate this capability, he deployed a RSAF squadron to the U.S. to participate in war games with U.S. Air Force units. The success of this deployment was noted by the U.S. Secretary of Defense and was instrumental in his approval of the AWACS and a modern command and control system, both of which would be under the control Saudi Arabian authority.

In 1984, Prince Fahd was appointed as assistant to the minister of defense. His role included regulating the Saudi Meteorological & Environmental Protection Agency (MEPA). He was president of the executive office of the Arab Ministerial Council of MEPA from 1987 to 2003.

In 1987, Prince Fahd was also appointed Chairman of the Saudi Economic Offset Committee (SEOC) responsible for implementing the Saudi Economic Offset Plan (SEOP), established to enhance the diversification of the Saudi economy through the introduction of high technology industries and the creation of new joint ventures between Saudi and foreign investors.

Under his leadership, the EOP generated investments in excess of SR 21 Billion and created more than 7,200 jobs with 56% Saudisation. Economic Offset companies accumulated revenues in excess of SR 49 Billion, almost 25% of which was from exports. Prince Fahd was taking his objective of self-sufficiency to the private sector. He structured the program to develop industries which could support both the national defense and private sector commercial requirements.

Prince Fahd was appointed to a new position as president of the General Authority for Civil Aviation (GACA) and chairman of the board of Saudi Arabian Airlines in November 2011 when the GACA was separated from the ministry defence and was reorganized as an independent unit. The GACA is responsible for the running of all national airports and controls civil air traffic within the kingdom.

Prince Fahd oversaw the introduction of the modern fleet to the Saudi Arabian Airlines 747-8 cargo, 777, and 787. Having established GACA on a very firm footing, Prince Fahd left the government in 2015.

== Personal life ==
Prince Fahd has seven children, including Saud. He spends his time focusing on a non profit organizations and giving back to the public. He is also a member of the board of trustees at The Princess Seeta bint Abdulaziz Foundation for Social Excellence.
