= Nawal al-Hawsawi =

Saudi Arabian female pilot

Nawal al-Hawsawi is a Saudi Arabian female pilot. Women becoming pilots is nearly impossible in Saudi Arabia, making Nawal al-Hawsawi a pioneer and a problem for the monarchy in the country. She also has led the country's women in fights against racism and domestic violence.

She has been referred to as the "Rosa Parks of Saudi Arabia", due to her indomitable spirit and desire to see women move forward in her country. Al-Hawsawi, who originated from Mecca, married a white American male.

She has a commercial pilot's license and is also a mental health counselor and marriage therapist. She founded the therapy provider Soundheart.org, which is not allowed to pass through filters on the internet with Saudi Arabia. She was verbally abused by a woman in Saudi, where verbal abuse is a crime. She won her case in Saudi Arabia, but she dropped charges against the woman, who is now her friend.She is not permitted to fly an aircraft in Saudi Arabia.

Her predicament does not appear to have gone unheard. Al-Hawsawi sent an accumulation of the hostile messages she has received on social media to the department of the interior in Saudi Arabia, and says the issue is being considered important, yet endeavors to find the abusers, the greater part of whom post secretly is requiring some serious effort. She is known for taking lessons from Nelson Mandela, Martin Luther King Jr., and Mahatma Gandhi, who fought with peaceful resistance, believing that only love and light will change the darkness of repression.
