= Al-Ahsa International Airport =

Airport in Hofuf, Saudi Arabia

Al-Ahsa International Airport مطار الأحساء الدولي
- IATA: HOF; ICAO: OEAH

Summary
- Airport type: Public
- Owner/Operator: General Authority of Civil Aviation
- Serves: Al-Ahsa Governorate
- Location: Hofuf, Saudi Arabia
- Opened: 1948; 78 years ago
- Elevation AMSL: 588 ft (179 m)
- Coordinates: 25°17′07″N 049°29′06″E

Map
- Location of airport in Saudi Arabia

Runways
Direction	Length		Surface
Direction	m	ft	Surface
16/34	3,060	10,039	Asphalt

Al-Ahsa International Airport (IATA: HOF, ICAO: OEAH) is an airport located in Hofuf, serving Al-Ahsa Governorate in Saudi Arabia.

== History ==
In 1945, Al-Ahsa International Airport was originally built as an airstrip.

In 1985, the airport was upgraded with a short runway, serving as an alternative landing ground to King Fahd International Airport. During Operation Desert Shield and the Gulf War in 1991, it served as an air base for the French Air Force.

General Authority of Civil Aviation (GACA), which is Saudi Arabia's civil aviation regulator, formally approved the airport's international status in 2011. A GACA study predicted that the airport was expected to grow by 300,000 passengers per annum between 2015 and 2020. Around 300,000 expatriate workers live in the area.

== Airlines and destinations ==
Airlines	Destinations
Flyadeal	Jeddah
flydubai	Dubai–International
flynas	Jeddah, Medina
Saudia	Jeddah

== See also ==
- Transport in Saudi Arabia
- List of airports in Saudi Arabia
