= Nesma Airlines =

Egyptian airline

IATA	ICAO	Call sign
NE	NMA	NESMA
- Founded: 2007
- Hubs: Cairo International Airport
- Fleet size: 10
- Destinations: 12
- Parent company: Nesma Holding Company Ltd.
- Headquarters: Cairo, Egypt
- Key people: Faisal Al-Turki, (CEO, Saudi Arabia); Karim Baky (CEO, Egypt)
- Website: nesmaairlines.com

Nesma Airlines is an Egyptian airline (member of Saudi Arabia’s Nesma Group) which operates scheduled international flights to/from Egypt as well as domestic flights within Egypt and Saudi Arabia. It operates as a full-service carrier on international flights.

== History ==
Nesma Airlines' first commercial flight was on 18 July 2010 from Hurghada to Ljubljana. The airline also operated charter flights linking Egypt, Europe, the Middle East, Saudi Arabia, the United Kingdom and Italy, Spain, Poland and France.

The airline started to operate scheduled flights to Saudi Arabia on the 24 June 2011 to Ha'il, Tabuk and Taif.

On 27 October 2016, the airline launched domestic services within Saudi Arabia, operating out of a central hub at Ha'il Regional Airport to various locations in the Saudi Arabia including Tabuk and Qaisumah using ATR 72-600 aircraft.

On 21 November 2016, Nesma Airlines began new routes from Jeddah between Riyadh, Dammam and Ha'il using A320 aircraft.

== Destinations ==
As of August 2024, Nesma Airlines' schedule flights included:

=== Africa ===
Egypt

- Cairo – Cairo International Airport Base
- Hurghada - Hurghada International Airport
- Luxor - Luxor International Airport
- Marsa Alam – Marsa Alam International Airport
- Sohag – Sohag International Airport

=== Asia ===
Egypt

- Sharm El Sheikh – Sharm El Sheikh International Airport

Saudi Arabia

- Al-Jawf – Al-Jawf Airport
- Ha'il - Ḥa'il Regional Airport
- Jeddah – King Abdulaziz International Airport
- Qassim – Qassim Airport
- Riyadh – King Khaled International Airport
- Tabuk – Tabuk Airport
- Taif – Taif Airport

=== Europe ===
Italy

- Milan - Milan Malpensa Airport

Russia

- Krasnodar - Krasnodar International Airport Seasonal charter
- Moscow - Vnukovo International Airport Seasonal charter
- Saint Petersburg - Pulkovo Airport Seasonal charter
- Saratov - Saratov Gagarin Airport Seasonal charter
- Volgograd - Gumrak Airport Seasonal charter

Slovakia

- Poprad - Poprad-Tatry Airport Seasonal charter

=== Interline agreements ===
- APG Airlines
- Hahn Air

== Fleet ==
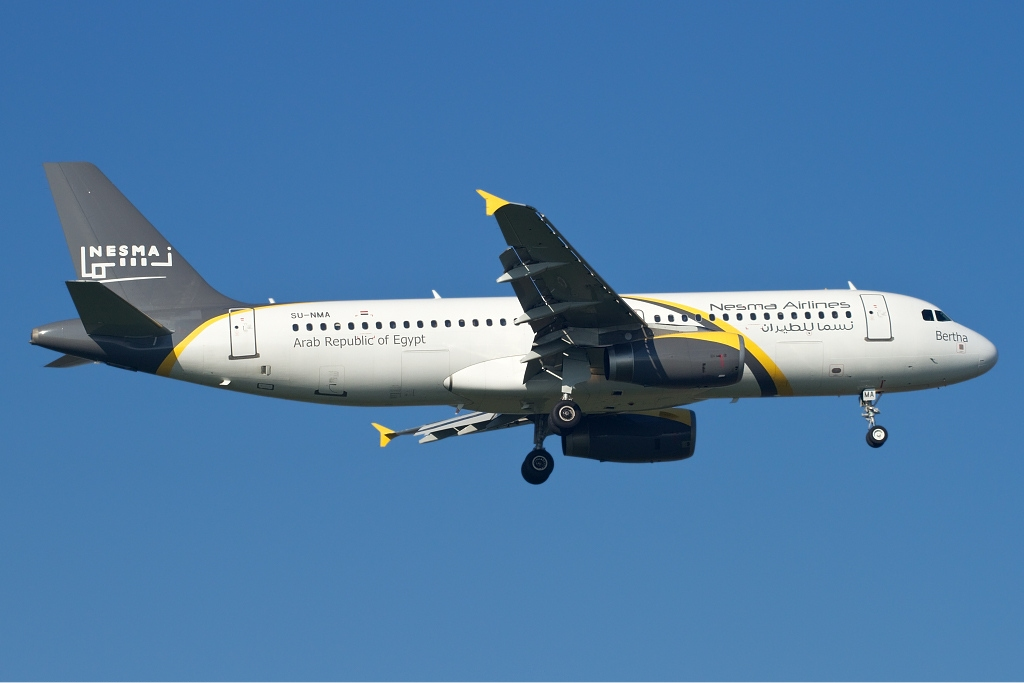
Nesma Airlines Airbus A320 Bertha

As of July 2026, Nesma Airlines operates the following aircraft:

=== Nesma Airlines Egypt current fleet ===
Nesma Airlines (Egypt) fleet
Aircraft	In service	Orders	Passengers	Notes
Airbus A320-200	7	—	180	
Airbus A321-200	3	—		
Total	10	—		

=== Former fleet ===
As of August 2025, Nesma Airlines operated 7 Airbus A320.

The airline previously operated the following aircraft:

- 1 Airbus A319
- 1 further Airbus A320

=== Nesma Airlines Saudi Arabia current fleet ===
As of July 2022, Nesma Airlines Saudi Arabia does not operate any of their own aircraft.

=== Nesma Airlines Saudi Arabia former fleet ===
- 4 ATR 72-600s
- 3 Airbus A320-200s
- 2 Airbus A321-200s
- 1 Boeing 777-200ER
