= Hail International Airport =

Airport in Hail, Saudi Arabia

Hail International Airport مطار حائل الدولي
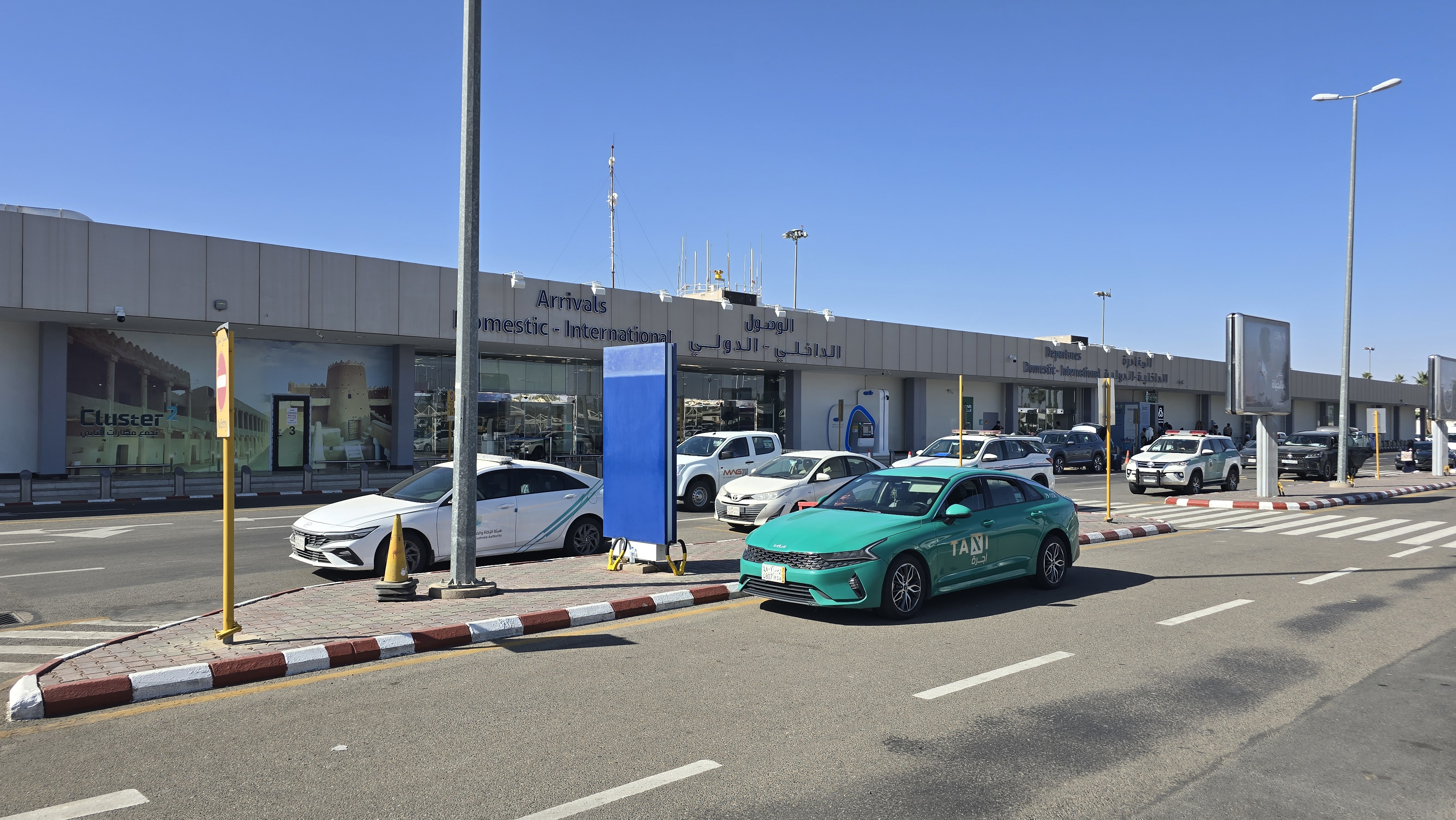
- IATA: HAS; ICAO: OEHL

Summary
- Airport type: Public
- Owner: General Authority of Civil Aviation
- Operator: Nesma Airlines
- Serves: Hail Province
- Location: Hail City, Saudi Arabia
- Opened: 1979; 47 years ago
- Elevation AMSL: 3,331 ft (1,015 m)
- Coordinates: 27°26′16″N 041°41′10″E

Map
- Location of airport in Saudi Arabia

Runways
Direction	Length		Surface
Direction	m	ft	Surface
18/36	3,720	12,204	Asphalt

Hail International Airport (IATA: HAS, ICAO: OEHL) is an airport located in Hail City, serving Hail Province in Saudi Arabia.

Hail International Airport was originally a regional airport but was later upgraded to international status in 2017. It currently operates a limited number of international flights.

== Facilities ==
The airport resides at an elevation of 3,331 feet (1,015 m) above mean sea level. It has one runway designated 18/36 with an asphalt surface measuring 3,720 by 45 metres (12,205 ft × 148 ft).

== Airlines and destinations ==
Airlines offering regularly scheduled passenger service:

Airlines	Destinations
Air Arabia	Cairo, Sharjah
Flyadeal	Dammam, Jeddah, Riyadh
Flydubai	Dubai–International
Flynas	Dammam, Riyadh
Jazeera Airways	Kuwait City
Nesma Airlines	Cairo
Nile Air	Cairo
Qatar Airways	Doha
Saudia	Jeddah, Riyadh

Note all international flights all offered by non-domestic airlines.

== Accidents and incidents ==
- On September 14, 2000, a Qatar Airways Airbus A300 from Doha en route to Amman, was diverted to Hail Airport after being hijacked by an Iraqi asylum seeker. The hijacker immediately surrendered to Saudi authorities upon landing, and the flight continued onward to Amman with no injuries or casualties.

== See also ==
- Transport in Saudi Arabia
- List of airports in Saudi Arabia
