= General Authority of Civil Aviation =

Saudi aviation authority

Coordinates: 24°55′28.61″N 46°42′58.14″E

- الهيئة العامة للطيران المدني

Agency overview
- Formed: 1934
- Jurisdiction: Government of Saudi Arabia
- Headquarters: Riyadh, Saudi Arabia
- Agency executive: Abdulaziz Al-Duailej, (President)
- Parent department: Ministry of Transport and Logistic Services
- Website: www.gaca.gov.sa

The General Authority of Civil Aviation (GACA; Arabic: الهيئة العامة للطيران المدني) is a governmental authority in Riyadh, Saudi Arabia, first established in 1934. GACA regulates and develops civil aviation and the air transport industry in Saudi Arabia, and monitors their performance.

== History ==
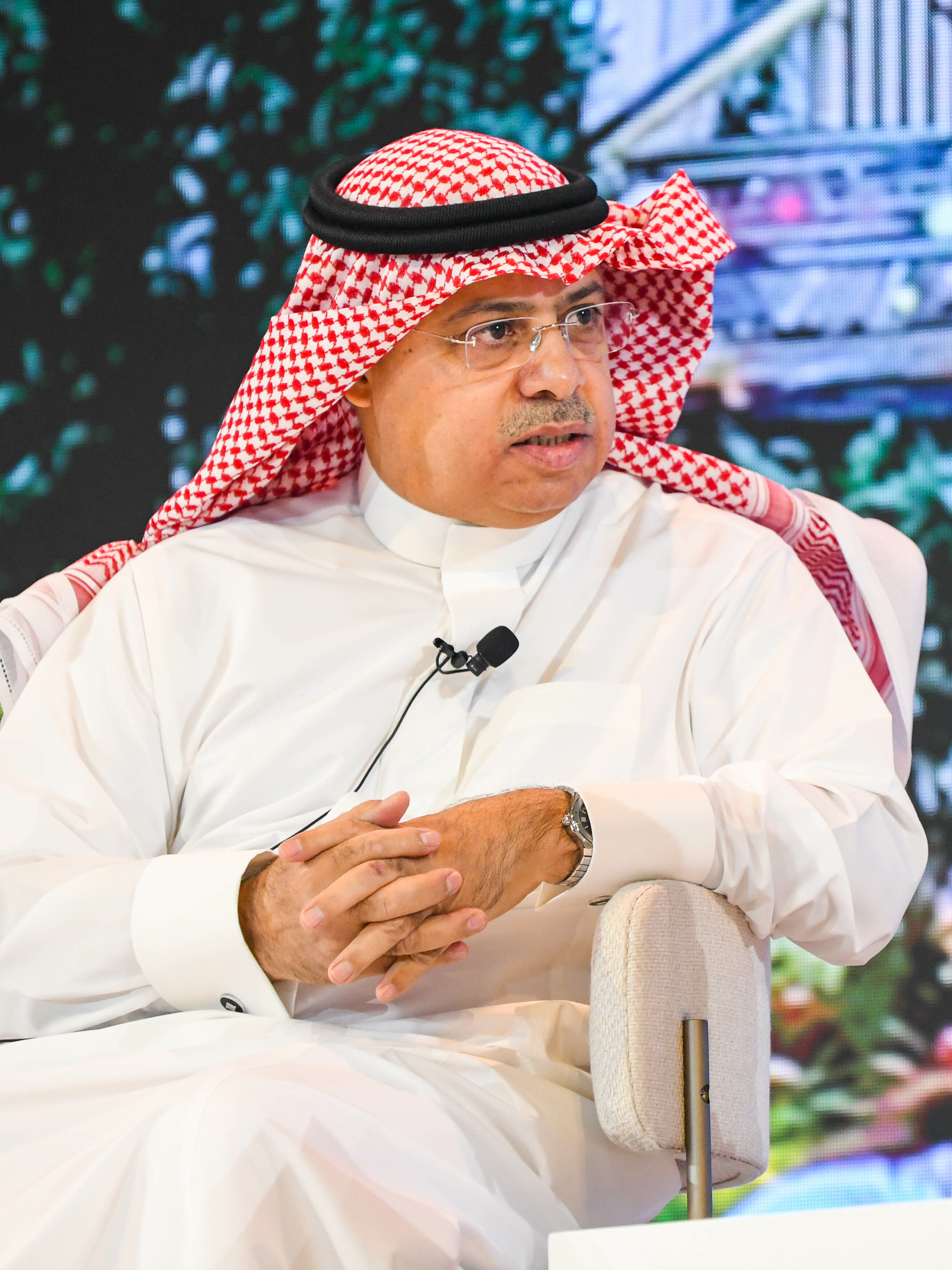
Abdulaziz Al-Duailej, the GACA head, in November 2022

In 1947, the authority responsible for civil aviation in Saudi Arabia was formally established under the name "Civil Aviation Authority", which included both Saudi Airlines and the Civil Aviation Administration.

In 1963, it was renamed the "Civil Aviation Directorate", and Saudi Airlines was separated from it. In 1977, it was renamed to the "Civil Aviation Presidency".

Over the period of 2004-2017, the Saudi cabinet has issued several decisions that transformed GACA. In 2004, it was renamed "General Authority of Civil Aviation", officially abbreviated as "GACA", and transformed into a public authority with legal personality, financial independence, and administrative autonomy, operating based on commercial principles and standards. In 2011, it was separated from the Ministry of Defense, and in 2016, it was linked to the Ministry of Transport and Logistic Services. In 2017, GACA's operational and legislative functions were made separate.

== See also ==
- Matarat Holding Company
- Saudi Aviation Club
- History of women in aviation in Saudi Arabia
