= Bondar (disambiguation) =

Bondar is a surname of East Slavic origin.

Bondar may also refer to:

== Places in Iran ==
=== Hormozgan Province ===
- Bondar, Bandar Abbas
- Bondar, Minab
- Bondar Rural District

=== Isfahan Province ===
- Bondar, Isfahan

=== Kerman Province ===
- Bondar, Kerman
- Bondar-e Gavsin
- Bondar-e Geshkin
- Bondar Ziaratgah

=== Mazandaran Province ===
- Bondar-e Olya
- Bondar-e Sofla

=== Other uses ===
- Bondar (dance), Ukrainian folk dance

== See also ==
- Bandar (disambiguation)
- Bandor (disambiguation)
