= Bandar (port) =

Persian word for "port" or "haven"

Bandar or Bunder (in Persian بندر) is a Persian word meaning 'port' and 'haven'. Etymologically it combines Persian بند Band ('enclosed') and در dar ('gate, door') meaning 'an enclosed area' (i.e. protected from the sea) derived from Avestan Bandha (to tieup) and Dwara (entrance). The word travelled with Persian sailors over a wide area leading to several coastal places in Iran and elsewhere having Bandar ('haven') as part of their names. In some Indian languages the word Bandargah means 'port'. In Malay the word has undergone a semantic drift and is now always taken to mean 'city'. However, the word syahbandar, a historical term for 'harbourmaster', still survives. In Indonesian the meaning 'port' is somewhat retained (compare the term bandar udara, which literally translates to 'airport'). In Assamese-Bengali languages bondor means 'port'.

== Places ==
Various ports around the world derive their names from the word bandar. Some of them are listed (country-wise) below.

=== Bangladesh ===
- Bandar Upazila
- Bandar Thana

=== India ===
The west coast of India, with its historic links to Persia, has several place names that include the word bunder. The city of Bombay historically had a number of piers along its waterfronts, each named after the cargo it typically handled (or at times a landmark or important personality). The piers are long gone, but the place names continue to be used today. A coastal town in Andhra Pradesh by name Machilipatnam is also called Bandar by the local people over there. These include:

- Apollo Bunder
- Akhtar Bunder
- Arthur Bunder
- Ballard Bunder
- Boree Bunder (boree = sack or bag)
- Brick Bunder
- Carnac Bunder
- Chendani Bunder
- Chinch Bunder
- Chincholi Bunder
- Colsa Bunder (colsa = coal)
- Dana Bunder (dana = grain)
- Ghod Bunder (ghod = horses)
- Haji Bunder
- Hay Bunder
- Kerosene Bunder
- Lakdi Bunder (lakdi = timber)
- Masjid Bunder (masjid = mosque - however, this pier was named after the Gate of Mercy Synagogue)
- Machilipatnam or Masulipatnam is also called Bundaru by Andhra people in Andhra Pradesh
- Mith Bunder
- Nagla Bunder
- Reti Bunder (reti = sand)
- Tank Bunder
- Wadi Bunder
- Zakaria Bunder

Similarly, in the state of Gujarat, several town names include the word bunder:

- Bhavnagar
  - Ferry Bunder
  - Old Bunder
- Billimoria
  - Vakharia Bunder
- Jambusar
  - Kavi Bunder
  - Tankari Bunder
- Jamnagar
  - Bedi Bunder
  - Salaya Bunder
  - Sikka Bunder
  - Rozi Bunder
  - Vadinar Bunder
- Kandla
  - Jafarwadi Bunder
  - Tuna Bunder
- Porbunder
- Valsad
  - Valsad Bunder
- Veraval Bunder
  - Bhidiya Bunder
  - Khadi Bunder
  - Nava Bunder
  - Veraval Bunder
- Sanjan
  - Sanjan Bunder

=== Indonesia ===
- Banda Aceh
- Bandar Lampung
- Banjarmasin

=== Iran ===
- Bandar Abbas
- Bandar Anzali
- Bandar Imam
- Bandar Lengeh
- Bandar Torkman
- Bandar Charak
- Bandar-e Jask
- Bandar-e Olya
- Bandar-e Sofla, Mazandaran
- Bandar, Isfahan
- Bandar, Kermanshah
- Bandar, Yazd
- Bondar (disambiguation)
- Bandor (disambiguation)

=== Malaysia ===
- Bandar Ainsdale
- Bandar Baru Bangi
- Bandar Bayan Baru
- Bandar Tun Razak
- Bandar Samariang
- Bandar Seberang Jaya
- Bandar Seri Putra
- Bandar Sri Damansara

=== Oman ===
- Bandar Khayran
- Bandah Jadidah
- Bandar Jissah

=== Pakistan ===
- Keti Bandar
- Shamal Bandar

=== Somalia and the East African Coast ===
- Bandar Beyla
- Boosaaso, formerly known as Bandar Qaasim
- A coastal region of Somalia is called Banaadir, however Arab geographers applied the term historically to all port cities of the East African coast, from Somalia to Mozambique.

=== Other countries ===
- Bandar el-Mansura, Egypt
- Bandar Seri Begawan, capital of Brunei
- Bandar, Afghanistan
- Bandar, India
- The Bund, a district in Shanghai, China
- Bandara, linked to original Persian "port". A name, a title, for a clan of chieftains in central highlands of Sri Lanka, whose origins date back to early migrations from Northwest India.
- Al Bandar, Abu Dhabi, UAE.
