= Bandar =

Bandar or Bunder may refer to:

== Places ==
- Bandar, Afghanistan
- Bandar, Narayanganj, Bangladesh
- Bandar, Isfahan, Iran
- Bandar, Kermanshah, Iran
- Bandar, Yazd, Iran
- Bandar Abbas, Iran
- Bandar Ainsdale, Malaysia
- Banda Aceh, Indonesia
- Bandar Lampung, Indonesia
- Bandar Seri Begawan, Brunei
- Machilipatnam, India, alternative name

== Persons ==
=== Given name ===
- Bandar Al Hajjar (born 1953), Saudi Arabian economist
- Bandar bin Talal Al Rashid, one of the emirs of Jabal Shammar
- Bandar bin Abdulaziz Al Saud, a former senior prince in Saudi Arabia
- Bandar bin Faisal Al Saud, a former Saudi royal
- Bandar bin Khalid Al Saud, Saudi businessman
- Bandar bin Sultan Al Saud, former Saudi ambassador to the USA
- Bandar Abdulrahman Al-Mohanna, Saudi chief executive officer Flynas
- Bandar Nasser (born 1990), Saudi professional footballer

=== Surname ===
- Awad Hamed al-Bandar, Iraqi chief judge under Saddam Hussein's presidency

=== Father name ===
- Faisal bin Bandar Al Saud, Saudi prince, governor of Riyadh Region
- Faisal bin Bandar Al Saud, Saudi businessman and government official
- Khalid bin Bandar Al Saud, Saudi ambassador to the UK
- Khalid bin Bandar Al Saud, former president of the General Intelligence and former governor of the Riyadh Province
- Reema bint Bandar Al Saud, Saudi ambassador to the USA

== Other uses ==
- Bandar (port), a Persian word
- Bandar tribe, in the comic series The Phantom
- Bandar, a fictional Middle-Eastern country with a Persian-speaking population, in the fifth season of the TV series Scandal
- Bandar (beetle), a genus of long-horned beetles in the subfamily Prioninae
- Bandar (state constituency), state constituency in Malaysia
- Operation Bandar, codename of the 2019 Balakot airstrike by India in Pakistan
- Bandar (film), 2025 Indian film directed by Anurag Kashyap

== See also ==
- Banda (disambiguation)
- Bandar-log, a term in Rudyard Kipling's novel The Jungle Book
- Bandar-e Mahshahr, city in Iran
- Bandari (disambiguation)
- Bandor (disambiguation)
- Bandargah (disambiguation)
- Bandra, a suburb of West Mumbai in the state of Maharashtra, India
- Bondar (disambiguation)
