= Bandari =

Bandari can refer to:

== People with the name ==
- Bandari (name), list of people with the name

== Other uses ==
- Bandari music, a style of music of Iran
- Bandari dance, a dance style of Iran
- Bandari language, an Iranian language
- Bandari F.C. (Kenya), a Kenyan football club
- Bandari F.C. (Tanzania), a Tanzanian football club
- Bandari (music project), a Swiss music project

== See also ==
- Bhandari, a surname
- Bandar (disambiguation)
