= Billimoria =

Billimoria or Bilimoria is an Indian (Parsi) toponymic surname from the town of Bilimora in the Navsari district of Gujarat, India.

. Notable people with the surname include:

- Cawas Billimoria (born 1962), Indian judoka
- Dinshaw Billimoria (1904–1942), Indian actor
- Eddie Billimoria (1900–1981), Indian actor
- F. N. Billimoria (1933–2005), Indian Army officer
- Gulestan Rustom Billimoria, Indian philanthropist
- Homi Billimoria (1901–1956), Ceylonese architect
- Jeroo Billimoria (born 1965), Indian social entrepreneur
- Karan Bilimoria, Baron Bilimoria, British-Indian entrepreneur
- Purushottama Bilimoria, Australian-American philosopher and professor
- Rustomji Bomanji Billimoria, Indian physician
