= Afanasy Nikitin =

Russian merchant and traveler (died 1475)

- Афанасий Никитин
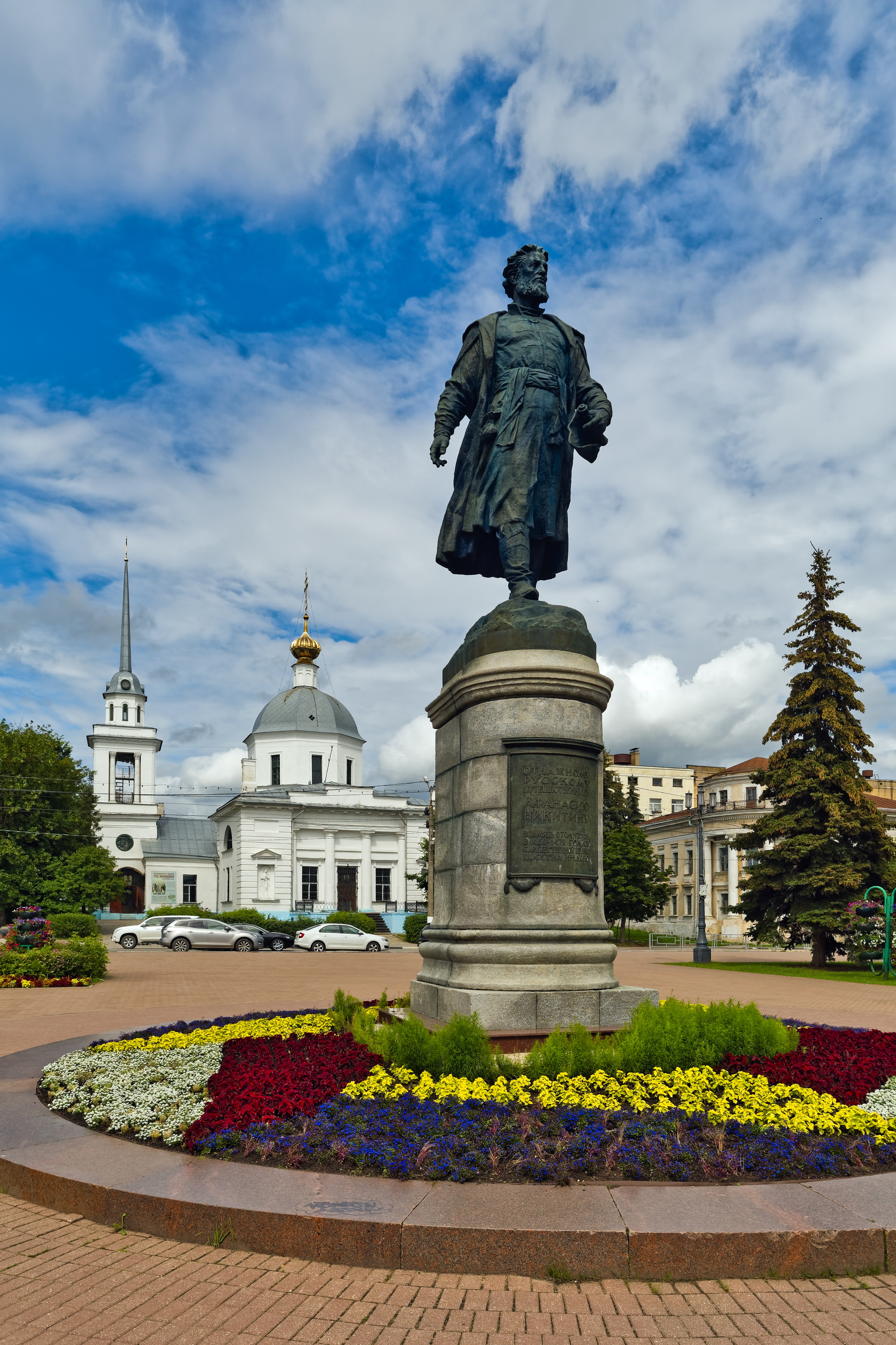
- Monument to Afanasy Nikitin in Tver, Russia
- Born: Tver, Principality of Tver
- Died: c. spring 1475; Near Smolensk, Grand Duchy of Lithuania
- Writing career
- Language: Russian
- Notable work: A Journey Beyond the Three Seas

Afanasy Nikitin (Note: Also known as Athanasius Nikitin.) (Russian: Афанасий Никитин; died 1475) was a Russian merchant from Tver and one of the first Europeans (after Niccolò de' Conti) to travel to and document his visit to India. He described his trip in a narrative known as A Journey Beyond the Three Seas (Khozheniye za tri morya).

== Life ==
Afanasy Nikitin, son of Nikita, was a merchant in Tver. Prior to his voyage to Persia and India, Afanasy Nikitin was probably engaged in long-distance trade and had previously traveled to the Ottoman Empire, the Grand Duchy of Lithuania, Moldavia, Wallachia, Georgia, Crimea, and other countries. In 1466 or 1468, (Note: Previously, 1466 was widely accepted as the beginning of Nikitin's journey. This date was first proposed by Izmail Sreznevsky in 1856. In 1978, L. S. Semyonov proposed 1468 as the date of Nikitin's departure from Russia. This later date has been increasingly used as the start of Nikitin's journey. Nikitin's account contains no concrete dates, which makes the precise dating of its events difficult.) Nikitin left his hometown of Tver on a commercial trip, planning to trade in the lands around the Caspian Sea and go as far as Shirvan (in modern-day Azerbaijan). He travelled down the Volga, stopping at the Makaryev Monastery, then passing through Uglich, Kostroma, and Plyos to get to Nizhny Novgorod. Following the caravan of the returning ambassador to Moscow from Shirvan, Hasan Beg, Nikitin and his fellow merchants traveled further south.

Near Astrakhan, his party was attacked and robbed first by Nogais (whom he calls Tatars), then again by Kaitags on the Caspian coast. Niktin's belongings were stolen, and some of his fellow Russian merchants were taken prisoner by the Kaitags. Nikitin went to the Shirvanshah's (the ruler of Shirvan) camp in Shemakha to plead for help. The Russian merchants "humbly begged" Shirvanshah to give them "the wherewithal to reach Rus". His captured companions were rescued by the Shirvanshah; however, he refused to give him and his companions means to return home. At that point, Nikitin writes, his party dispersed: "we wept and dispersed; those of us who owned something in Rus left for Rus, and those who had debts there went wherever they could; some remained at Shemakha, while others went to work at Baku".

Hoping to recoup his losses, (Note: Yakov Lurye writes that Nikitin must have acquired his goods on credit and would have faced enslavement as a debtor if he had returned home empty-handed, thus explaining his decision to continue his journey and seek further trading opportunities. This is disputed by Gail Lenhoff and Janet Martin, who write that it is more likely that Nikitin had purchased his goods using his own modest resources.) Nikitin continued on to Derbent, which was a familiar market to him, and then to Baku. He then crossed the Caspian Sea into Persia, where he followed a known trade route and made prolonged stops in market towns. He passed through Chapakur (Chapak Rud, where he remained for six months), Sari, Amol, Kashan, and Yazd before reaching Hormuz in the Persian Gulf. All in all, he remained in Persia for two years. Having heard about the riches of India from Muslim merchants, he decided to travel there. In the spring of 1471, Nikitin sailed for India from Hormuz and, after making several stops, arrived in the port of Chaul six weeks later. It was probably after his arrival in India that he began writing his travel notes.

Nikitin observed the markets, lifestyles and courts of the Bahmani Sultanate and the Vijayanagara Empire. He visited the Hindu sanctuary of Parvattum, which he called "the Jerusalem of the Hindus". He mentions that he engaged in horse-dealing, although his mercantile activities may have been more extensive than directly stated in his account. He spent almost three years in India, before deciding to return to Russia after concluding that further travel would not make him any great profit and that he could not afford to remain in India. Nikitin, in his writings, showed a longing to return to his homeland: "May God protect the Russian land! There is no land in the world like it. But why can the princes in the Russian land not live with each other as brothers? May the Russian land be well ordered, because justice there is quite rare".

On his way back, Nikitin visited Muscat, the Arabian sultanate of Somalia, and Trabzon. In November 1474, he sailed from Trebizond to Caffa (now Feodosia), where there was a large Russian settlement. It is most likely in Caffa that he composed Khozheniye za tri morya on the basis of his travel notes and memories. On his way to Tver, Nikitin died not far from Smolensk in the spring of 1475. Other Russian merchants took his notes to Vasily Mamyrev, secretary to Ivan III, the grand prince of Moscow. Nikitin's notes were considered valuable, so they were included in state chronicles dating from the late 15th to the 17th centuries. The author of the Lvov Chronicle writes that he received Nikitin's notes in 1475 and incorporated them into his work but was unable to learn anything more about the traveler.

== Writings ==
During his trip, Nikitin studied the population of India, its political structure, agriculture, trade (he witnessed war-games featuring war elephants), customs and ceremonies. He describes the appearances of Indians, their clothing and food, interrelations, and so on. Nikitin's notes mention: "the countrymen are very poor, but the boyars are rich and live in luxury". The abundance and trustworthiness of Nikitin's factual material provide a valuable source of information about India at that time, and his remarks on the trade of Hormuz, Cambay, Calicut, Dabhol, Ceylon, Pegu and China; on royal progresses and other functions, both ecclesiastical and civil, at the Bahmani capital Bidar, and on the wonders of the great fair at Parvattum—as well as his comparisons of things Russian and Indian—deserve special notice.

Nikitin's descriptions show his ability to describe geographical features that were completely unfamiliar to him. He described the rainy season while living in Junnar, when "throughout four months there was water and mud everywhere, both by day and at night. That is the season of ploughing and of sowing wheat and rice and pulse, and all other crops". Nikitin also gained first-hand knowledge of Hindu customs. His notes mention: "They did not hide from me when eating, praying, or doing something else; nor did they conceal their wives". Some of the customs and behaviors of the people were so alien to him that his descriptions of everyday life were sometimes exaggerated—for example, the women's love for "white" European men. He also mentioned the following two legends, which he appeared to accept as true:

In that Aland [Aladinand?] there is a bird, gukuk, that flies at night and cries gukuk, and any roof it lights upon, there the man will die; and whoever attempts to kill it will see fire flashing from its beak... As to monkeys, they live in the woods and have their monkey kniaz [prince], who is attended by a host of armed followers. When any of them is caught they complain to their kniaz, and an army is sent after the missing one; and when they come to a town they pull down the houses and beat the people; and their armies, it is said, are many. They speak their own tongues and bring forth a great many children; and when a child is unlike its father or its mother, it is thrown out on the highroad. Thus they are often caught by the Hindoos, who teach them every sort of handicraft, or sell them at night, that they might not find their way home, or teach them dancing.

== Religion ==
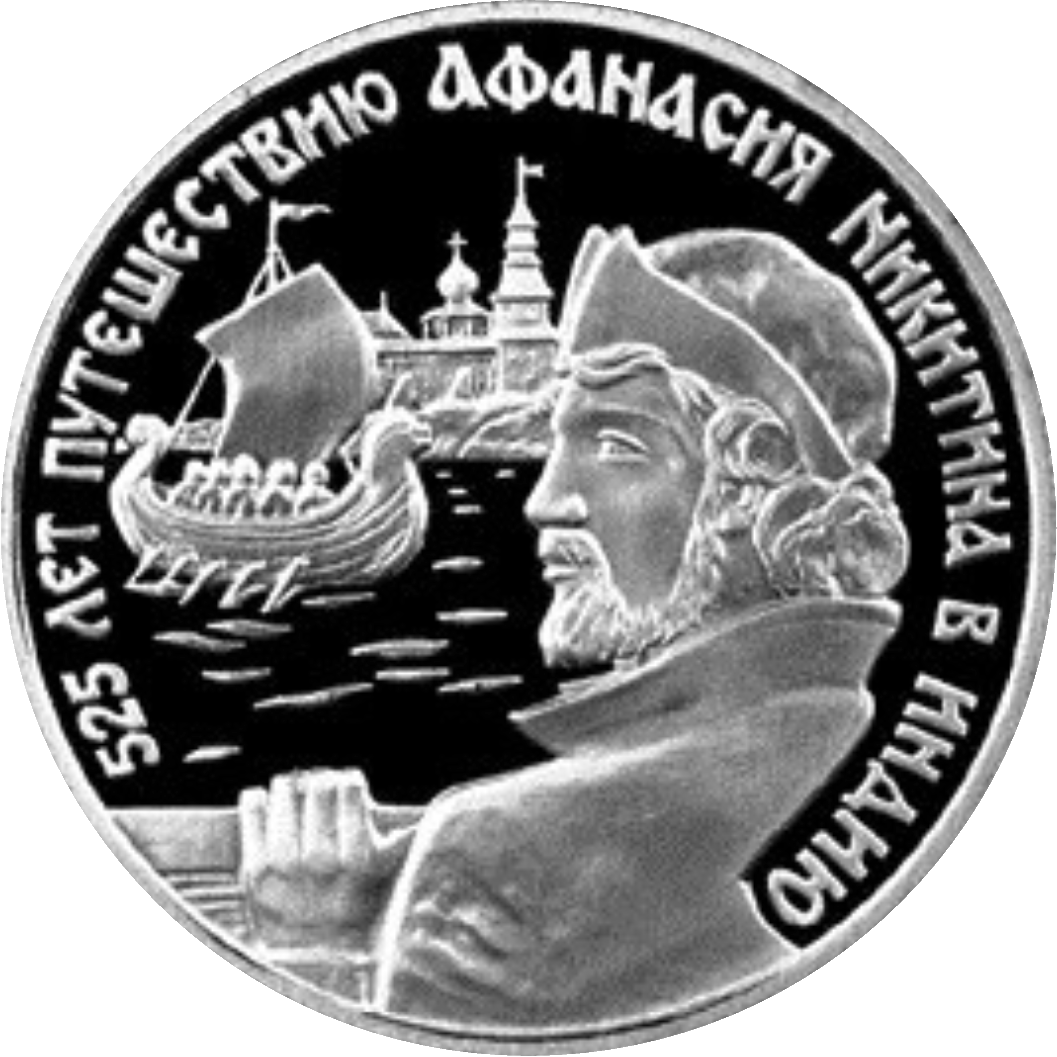
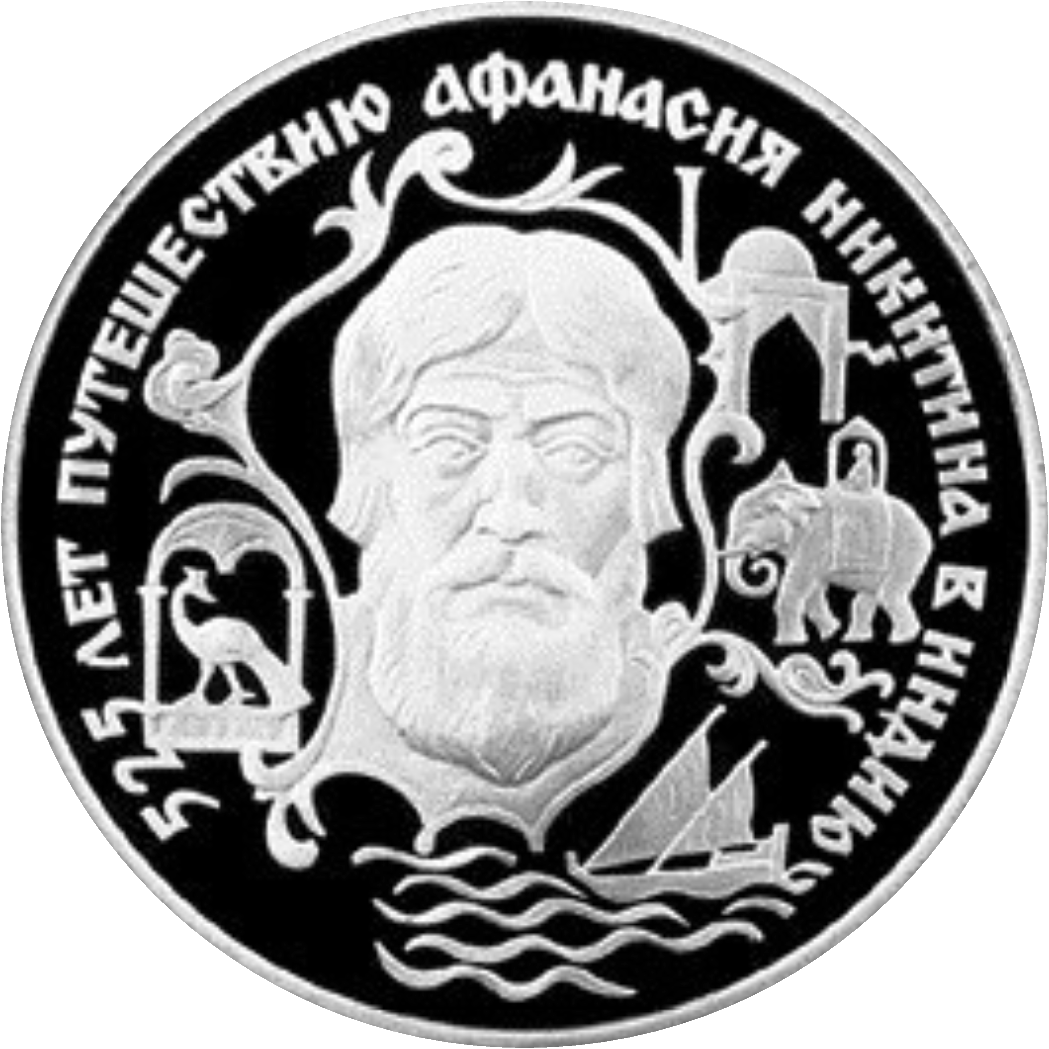
1997 commemorative coin of the Bank of Russia

After studying Nikitin's account, and especially his references to Islam (much of India was ruled by Muslim sultans, and many Muslim merchants lived along the coast), particularly the prayers he transliterates from Arabic and Turkic into Cyrillic letters, Gail Lenhoff and Janet Martin speculated that Nikitin might have converted to Islam in India.

His loss of contact with Christianity and his life among Muslims (and apparent lapse from Christianity and conversion to Islam) bothered him, as he mentioned several times in his account. Indeed, he began his account calling it his "sinful voyage beyond three seas." He went on to explain that he continued to date events by Christian religious holidays and invoked the Mother of God and the saints ("the Holy Fathers"), he could not remember when Christian holidays were and so he could not celebrate Easter and other movable feast days or keep the Christian fasts (Lent, the St. Peters' Fast, the fast during Advent, etc.). Thus, he kept the fasts of the Muslims and broke fast when they did so. He also wrote that at Bindar in the third year of his journey he "shed many tears for the Christian faith". Very near the end of his account, he wrote of his wish to return home and to the Christian faith: "I, Afanasy, a damned servant of Almighty God, Maker of heaven and earth, pondered over the Christian faith, the Baptism of Christ, the fasts established by the Holy Fathers, and the apostolic commandments, and I longed to go [back] to Rus!".

Yakov Lurye, an editor of Nikitin's Journey, sees his conversion as doubtful, pointing out that a circumcised convert would have been persecuted or even put to death in Rus', so if Nikitin had indeed become a Muslim, he would have avoided returning to his country, while in fact he died on his way back in the territory of the Grand Duchy of Lithuania not far from the Muscovite border. However, Lurye characterizes Nikitin's religious expressions as "the peculiar syncretism of a man who acknowledged any monotheistic faith as 'true', if practiced with a pure heart".

== Legacy ==
=== Historiography ===
Scholars became aware of Nikitin's Voyage relatively early and prominent historians mentioned it in their works, such as Nikolay Karamzin (1766–1826) in his History of the Russian State (1817). The text of Nikitin's Voyage in the Sofia Second Chronicle was published in its entirety for the first time in 1821. A German translation of Nikitin's notes was also published in 1835 as "Reise nach Indien unternommen von einem Russischen Kaufmann im 15 Jahrhundert" in Dorpater Jahrbücher für Literatur. The Russian diplomat in London, Mikhail Vielgorsky, translated a version for the Hakluyt Society, which was published in 1855. Many historians have used Nikitin's notes as a dependable source for the history of India in the 15th-century.

The dates of Nikitin's travels have been debated by scholars; it was generally accepted until the 1980s that Nikitin spent the years 1466–1472 in India, when Leonid S. Semyonov challenged these dates and published a book dedicated to Nikitin's travels in 1980. His chronology was accepted in the Literaturnye Pamiatniki series by the Russian Academy of Sciences. According to Semyonov's reconstruction, Nikitin left Russia in 1468 and spent the years 1471–1474 in India.

=== Tributes ===
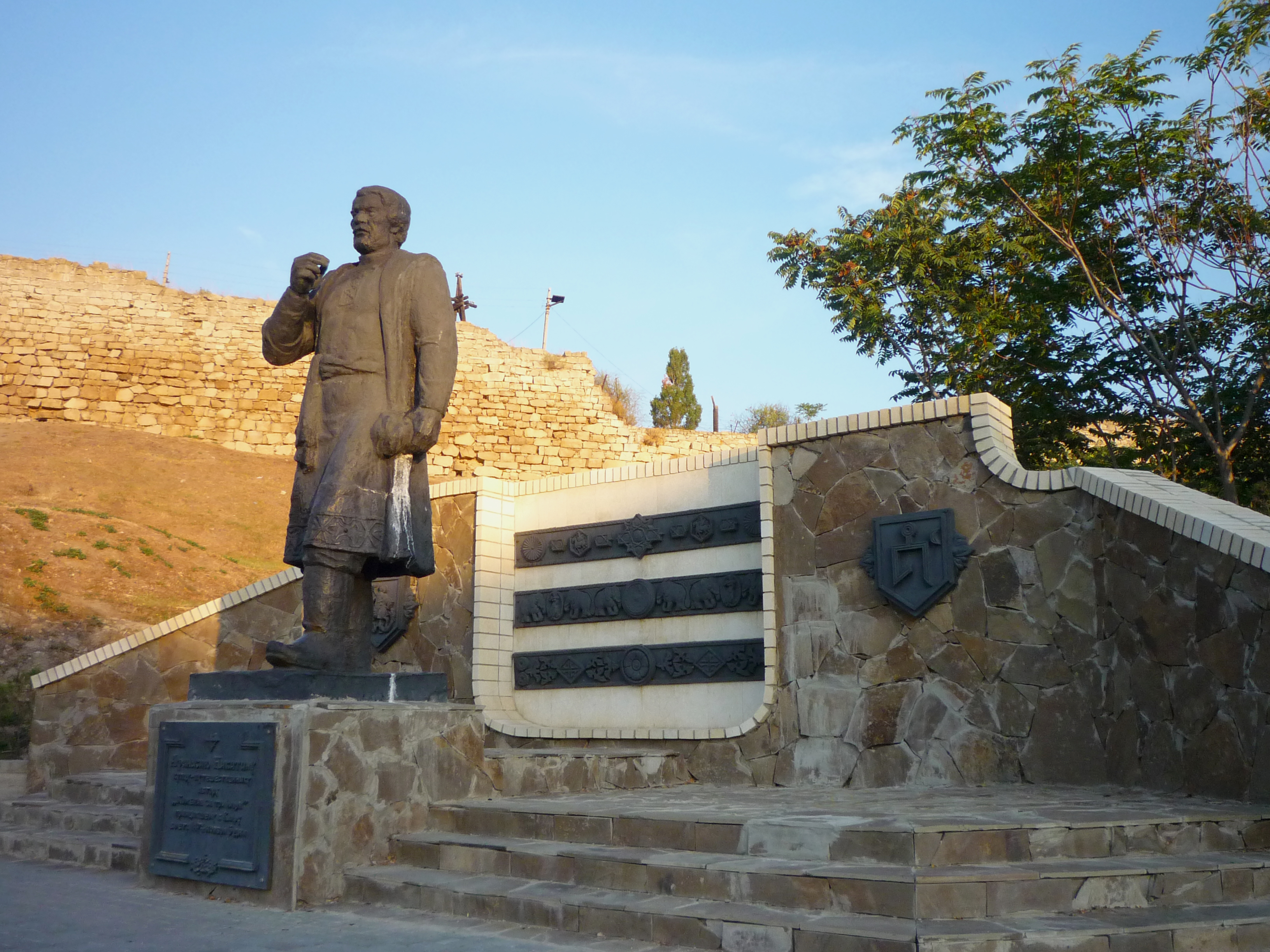
Monument to Afanasy Nikitin in Feodosia, Crimea

In 1955, the local authorities of Tver erected a bronze monument to Afanasy Nikitin on the bank of the Volga River. The sculptor was Sergei Orlov. There is a folk legend that this statue was raised because Nikita Khrushchev, upon visiting India, told Prime Minister Jawaharlal Nehru that there was a statue of Nikitin in Russia when in fact there was not (Nehru had asked if the Russians had honored the first Russian to visit India). So as not to be proven a liar, Khrushchev phoned back to Russia demanding that a statue of Nikitin be built immediately, before Nehru's state visit to Russia. The statue was featured on a Russian postage stamp in 2005 commemorating the 75th anniversary of the establishment of Tver Oblast.

In 1997, Nikitin was featured on a coin commemorating the 525th anniversary of his journey, issued by the Bank of Russia.

In 1958, the Russian state-owned Mosfilm Studio and Indian director Khwaja Ahmad Abbas' "Naya Sansar International" production house co-produced a film entitled The Journey Beyond Three Seas with Oleg Strizhenov cast as Nikitin.

The 1962-built icebreaker Ledokol-2 was renamed Afanasy Nikitin in 1966.

In 2000, a black obelisk was erected in Nikitin's honor at Revdanda, 120 km south of Mumbai, the probable location where he first set foot in India.

In 2006, the Indian organization Adventures & Explorers, with the support of the Embassy of India in Moscow and the Tver Regional Administration sponsored a Nikitin Expedition, in which 14 travelers set out from Tver to retrace Nikitin's journey through Russia, the Middle East, and Central Asia to India. The expedition lasted from 12 November 2006 to 16 January 2007. The Indian newspaper The Hindu filed several reports on the expedition's progress. After reaching India, two members of the expedition set out in March 2007 from Mumbai in SUVs to retrace Nikitin's travels around India itself.

The Afanasy Nikitin Seamount in the Indian Ocean is named in his honor.

On 17 April 2022, the Kozhikode Corporation paid tribute to Afanasy Nikitin, commemorating the 550th anniversary of his visit to Kozhikode. Moreover, Customs Road in the city was renamed after Nikitin, also establishing a ‘twin city’ status with Tver, the birthplace of Nikitin.

=== In popular culture ===
The Russian rock band Aquarium composed a song titled "Afanasy Nikitin Boogie". The power metal band Epidemia composed a song titled "Khozhdeniye za tri morya (Walking the three seas) about Nikitin's writings. A brand of Tver beer, "Afanasy", is named after Afanasy Nikitin.

== See also ==
- Daniel the Traveller
- Chronology of European exploration of Asia

== Sources ==
- Alam, Muzaffar; Subrahmanyam, Sanjay (2007). Indo-Persian Travels in the Age of Discoveries, 1400–1800. Cambridge University Press. ISBN 978-0-521-78041-4.
- Berite, I. G., ed. (1960). Khozhenie za tri moria Afanasiia Nikitina 1466-1472 gg Хожение за три моря Афанасия Никитина 1466-1472 гг. [Afanasy Nikitin's Voyage Beyond Three Seas] (in Russian, English, and Hindi). Translated into English by S. Z Apresyan. Moscow: Geografiz.
- Cornwell, Neil (2 December 2013). Reference Guide to Russian Literature. Routledge. p. 583. ISBN 978-1-134-26070-6.
- Lenhoff, Gail D.; Martin, Janet L. B. (1989). "The Commercial and Cultural Context of Afanasij Nikitin's Journey Beyond Three Seas". Jahrbücher für Geschichte Osteuropas. 37 (3): 321–344. ISSN 0021-4019. JSTOR 41048307.
- Lenhoff, Gail (2004). "Nikitin, Afanasy". In Millar, James R. (ed.). Encyclopedia of Russian History. Vol. 3. Macmillan Reference USA. pp. 1055–1056.
- Lurye, Ia. S. (1986). "Russkiĭ «chuzhezemets» v Indii XV veka" Русский «чужеземец» в Индии XV века. In Semyonov, L. S.; Lurye, Ia. S. (eds.). Khozhenie za tri moria Afanasiia Nikitina Хожение за три моря Афанасия Никитина. Leningrad: Nauka. pp. 61–87.
- Major, R. H. (1857). "The Travels of Athanasius Nikitin". In Major, Richard Henry (ed.). India in the Fifteenth Century: Being a Collection of Narratives of Voyages to India in the Century Preceding the Portuguese Discovery of the Cape of Good Hope, from Latin, Persian, Russian, and Italian Sources. Translated by Count Wielhorsky. New York: Burt Franklin.
- Maxwell, M. J. (September 2006). "Afanasii Nikitin: An Orthodox Russian's Spiritual Voyage in the Dar al-Islam, 1468-1475". Journal of World History. 17 (3): 243–266. doi:10.1353/jwh.2006.0049.
- Perkhavko, V. B. (2013). "Nikitin Afanasiĭ" Ники́тин Афанасий. Bolʹshaia rossiĭskaia ėntsiklopediia Большая российская энциклопедия [Great Russian Encyclopedia] (in Russian). Vol. 22. Moscow: Great Russian Encyclopedia. pp. 717–718.
- Postnikov, Alexei V. (2003). Speake, Jennifer (ed.). Literature of Travel and Exploration: G to P. Taylor & Francis. pp. 859–861. ISBN 978-1-57958-424-5.
- Postnikov, Alexei V. (2007). "Nikitin, Athanasius". The Oxford Companion to World Exploration. Oxford University Press. ISBN 978-0-19-514922-7.
