= Bandargah =

Bandargah (Persian: بندرگاه) may refer to:

- Bandargah, Bushehr
- Bandargah, Zanjan

== See also ==
- Bandar (disambiguation)
