= Malay nobility =

Nobility system practised in Malay kingdoms of Southeast Asia

The Malay nobility comprises both hereditary and non-hereditary titles that have been integral to the Malay kingdoms of Maritime Southeast Asia since the 13th century. The Malacca Sultanate formalised the current nobility system, which has since influenced the political and social structures of most Malay kingdoms. Variations of this system continue to be practised today, particularly in regions where Malay monarchies still exist. These include areas in Brunei, Indonesia, and Malaysia.

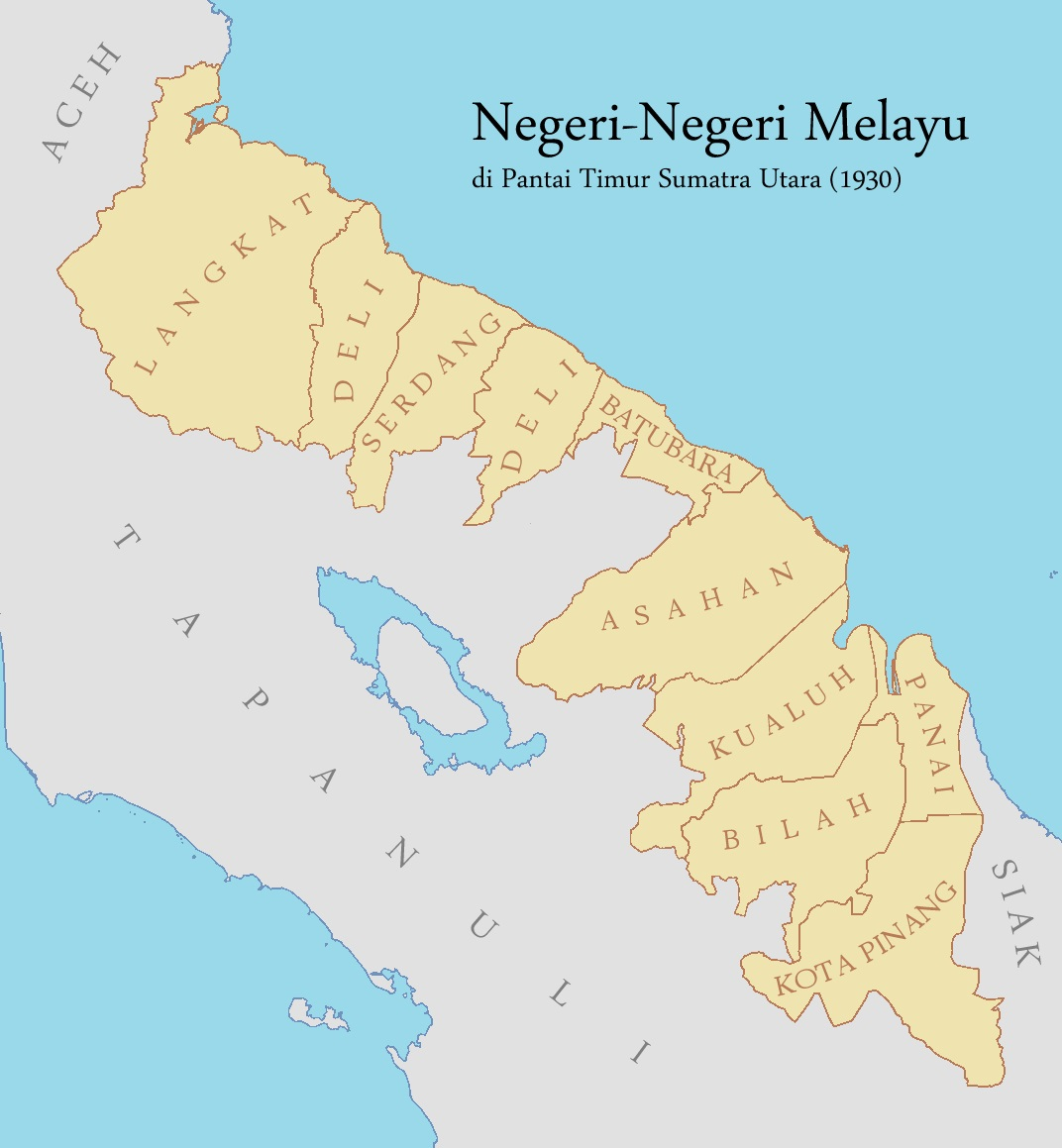
The map depicts the Malay kingdoms in Sumatra, Indonesia, during the 1930s. Although these monarchies were officially dissolved in 1946 during the socialist movement led by Sukarno, the royal institutions continued to be quietly maintained by the local population. In recent years, efforts have been made to revive them in a ceremonial capacity. Some noble families may have also survived and retained elements of their traditional status.

Before the rise of the Malacca Sultanate, many polities in Maritime Southeast Asia adhered to the mandala system (Sanskrit: मण्डलम्), a political model rooted in ancient Indian nobility and statecraft. The Islamisation of the region, along with influences from Middle Eastern merchants, travellers and scholars, played a significant role in transforming and formalising the nobility into the structure later recognised during the Malacca period. This led to the introduction of a new system of Malay peerage known as the Pembesar Empat Lipatan (Jawi: ڤمبسر امڤت ليڤتن).

Although each Malay kingdom across the archipelago has developed its own distinctive peerage structure, most remain heavily influenced by the hierarchical framework established by the Malacca Sultanate. Some kingdoms have preserved the tradition by retaining systems closely modelled on the Malaccan model, albeit with minor adaptations over time.

The following are examples of Malay peerage systems still in use today:

- Peerage of Brunei
- Peerage of Kedah
- Peerage of Negeri Sembilan
- Peerage of Pahang
- Peerage of Perak
- Peerage of Sarawak
- Peerage of Selangor
- Peerage of Terengganu

== Pembesar Empat Lipatan: Foundation of the Malay Nobility ==
The Pembesar Empat Lipatan (Jawi: ڤمبسر امڤت ليڤتن), meaning "Four tiers of Nobility", was a hierarchical system of hereditary peerage established during the era of the Malacca Sultanate. It formed the structural basis of Malay aristocracy and continues to influence the nobility systems of modern Malay monarchies, albeit in adapted forms. At least three present-day Malaysian monarchies continue to maintain the Pembesar Empat Lipatan in a form closely resembling its original structure. Others have significantly modified the system, although the foundational framework remains recognisable.

The system was partially inspired by the mandala political model practised by earlier Malay civilisations such as Srivijaya, Malayapura, and Dharmasraya. The mandala model revolved around concentric zones of influence, where power and authority were concentrated near the political centre and diminished outward. However, this model was not entirely suitable for most Malay polities due to their geographical settings. Many of these kingdoms were situated near river mouths or coastal settlements, which made the application of the mandala system in its original form impractical.

With the spread of Islam and increased contact with the Middle East, new ideas of royal and noble hierarchy were introduced by merchants, scholars, and travellers from West Asia, Central Asia, and South Asia. The Malacca Sultanate adopted and adapted these concepts, blending them with the indigenous mandala-inspired structure. Although the philosophical underpinnings shifted, the Malay system retained the principle of layered authority.

The Pembesar Empat Lipatan developed into a four-tiered, feudal-style hierarchy of hereditary nobility. The highest tier consisted of four senior nobles. Each subsequent tier doubled in number, resulting in eight, sixteen, and thirty-two nobles, respectively. Each level carried distinct administrative, military, and ceremonial duties. These nobles served the monarch directly and played crucial roles in governance, defence, and state administration.

The four tiers of nobility were arranged in ascending order of rank and function as follows:

The Pembesar Empat Lipatan
Name	English translation	European feudal nobility equivalent (Note: This comparison isn't exact, as the regions are far apart, and Malay peerage is more influenced by Middle Eastern traditions than European ones. However, European peerage is used for familiarity.)	Notes
Pembesar Berempat	Four Nobles	Dukes	Also known as Menteri Empat Orang (منتري امڤت اورڠ; lit. 'Four Ministers'), this was the highest-ranking tier of hereditary nobility directly below the monarch. It comprised four powerful nobles who held significant influence over the administration and royal court.
Pembesar Berlapan	Eight Nobles	Marquess	The second tier, originally called Pembesar Delapan (ڤمبسر ديلاڤن), included eight hereditary nobles.
Pembesar Berenam Belas	Sixteen Nobles	Counts	The third tier consisted of sixteen hereditary nobles.
Pembesar Bertiga Puluh Dua	Thirty-Two Nobles	Baron	The lowest hereditary tier, comprising thirty-two nobles.

These nobles held roles in both administrative and royal court capacities. Their influence within the hierarchy was determined by their respective tier, with higher-ranking nobles possessing greater authority and responsibilities.

== Malay nobility during the Malacca Sultanate ==
The Malay nobility played a central role in the governance and expansion of the Malacca Sultanate. Their relationship with the Sultan was characterised by mutual dependence, forming a symbiotic alliance in which both parties required one another to maintain authority and influence. The Sultan relied on the loyalty and administrative capabilities of the nobility to consolidate and sustain his rule, while the nobles, in turn, depended on royal patronage to legitimise their positions and exercise local power.

These nobles formed the foundational structure of the Sultanate's political and administrative system. Empowered by royal decree, they contributed to the stability and prosperity of Malacca, enabling the Sultanate to grow into a dominant regional power. At its height, Malacca exerted control over much of the Malay Peninsula and parts of Sumatra.

The influence of the Malacca Sultanate also extended culturally and linguistically. The Malay language, promoted through the Sultanate's administration and trade networks, emerged as the lingua franca of Maritime Southeast Asia. The following section provides an overview of the class structure of the Malay nobility during the period of the Malacca Sultanate:

=== Administrative class structure of the Malacca Sultanate ===
The administrative framework of the Malacca Sultanate was centred around the Pembesar Empat Lipatan system, a four-tiered hierarchy of hereditary nobility. This system was further supported by a fifth tier comprising non-hereditary administrative officials. Each tier held distinct roles and responsibilities within the governance of the realm, forming a structured and hierarchical bureaucracy.

Administrative class structure
Name		Notes	Example of positions
Sultan (سلطان)		The Sultan serves as the sovereign monarch of the kingdom, with his word constituting a royal decree on all matters within his domain. He is supported by a royal court comprising nobles from the Pembesar Empat Lipatan hierarchy. In addition, the Sultan may appoint a Yamtuan (يمتوان), or Viceroy, to act as his regent and administer territories or colonies under his authority.	Sultan of Malacca
Pembesar Empat Lipatan (ڤمبسر امڤت ليڤتن)	Pembesar Berempat (ڤمبسر برامڤت)	The Pembesar Berempat were responsible for overseeing major fiefs and serving as senior ministers in key areas such as finance, warfare, internal affairs, and trade. They played a vital role in maintaining the stability and governance of the sultanate.	Bendahara (بنداهارا) (Prime minister and Minister of War), Laksamana (لقسامان) (Minister of Foreign Affairs, Deputy Minister of War, and Admiral of the fleet), (Note: Laksamana is the second-highest minister after the Bendahara, overseeing the Sultanate's naval fleet, diplomatic affairs, and serving as Deputy Minister of War.) Temenggong (تماڠڬوڠ) (Minister of Interior Affairs), and Penghulu Bendahari (ڤڠهولو بنداهاري) (Minister of Finance)
Pembesar Empat Lipatan (ڤمبسر امڤت ليڤتن)	Pembesar Berlapan (ڤمبسر برلاڤن)	This tier consists of sixteen nobles who held less critical ministerial roles and governed fiefs granted to them, which were smaller than those of the Pembesar Berempat. In some cases, their fiefs were located within the territories of the larger fiefs governed by the Pembesar Berempat.	Syahbandar (Note: Also spelt Shahbandar) (شهبندر) (Minister of Transport and Harbor master), Raja Besar Muda (راج بسر مودا) (Minister of Custom and Protocol), Qadhi (قاضي) (Minister of Justice), and Seri Bija Diraja (سري بيجا دراج)/Hulubalang Besar (هولوبالڠ بسر) (Note: During the Kingdom of Singapore and early Malacca Sultanate, the position akin to Chief of Army was Hulubalang Besar, and its holder was titled Seri Bija Diraja. Over time, the position itself became known as Seri Bija Diraja.) (General of the army).
Pembesar Empat Lipatan (ڤمبسر امڤت ليڤتن)	Pembesar Berenam Belas (ڤمبسر برانم بلس)	Sixteen nobles within this tier were entrusted with the management of smaller fiefs and the performance of specialised administrative duties on behalf of the Sultan or higher-ranking nobles within the kingdom's governance framework.	
Pembesar Empat Lipatan (ڤمبسر امڤت ليڤتن)	Pembesar Bertiga Puluh Dua (ڤمبسر برتيڬ ڤولوه دوا)	This tier represents the lowest level of hereditary nobility, serving as local administrators who assist higher-ranking nobles in the governance of the kingdom. They act on behalf of the Sultan or senior nobles, ensuring the smooth administration of minor regions and fiefs.	
Penghulu (ڤڠهولو)		Penghulu were non-hereditary nobles appointed by the monarch or fief lords, serving as intermediaries between the central authority and local communities. Their responsibilities included administering a mukim (مقيم) (township) or several villages and ensuring effective governance at the grassroots level. A Penghulu could be appointed from among the sons of nobles or from prominent clan leaders.	Town lord

• All writings in the Jawi script represent official titles that use classical Malay vocabulary (kosakata klasik).

• All positions within the administrative class, apart from the Sultan, were typically accompanied by the honorific prefix Dato' as part of their official titles. For instance, the title Bendahara would be formally styled as Dato' Bendahara, while Seri Bija Diraja would become Dato' Seri Bija Diraja.

=== Basic social and political structure of the Malacca Sultanate ===
The social hierarchy of the Malacca Sultanate closely reflected its administrative framework while encompassing a broader range of dynastic, courtly, military, and social roles beyond the Pembesar Empat Lipatan. Although modern Malaysian history textbooks often divide Malaccan society into two broad categories, namely the ruling class (golongan pemerintah; ݢولوڠن ڤمرينته) and the governed subjects (golongan diperintah; ݢولوڠن دڤرينته), the royal class (kerabat diraja; قرابت دراج) formed a distinct third group. Royal descent did not automatically confer government office, nor were members of the royal family ordinary subjects. However, royals could be appointed to pembesar positions, thereby entering the administrative establishment.

The social and political structure of the Sultanate differed significantly from European feudalism and modern constitutional monarchies. Administrative power was exercised through held offices rather than through dynastic lineage alone. Conversely, high-ranking pembesar exercised political authority that could limit royal power.

A prominent example of pembesar influence over royal succession occurred during the reign of Sultan Mansur Shah. According to the Sulalatus Salatin, the crown prince, Raja Muhammad, killed Tun Besar, who was the son of Bendahara Tun Perak, after Tun Besar accidentally knocked off the prince's headgear during a game of sepak raga. In response, Tun Perak and the leading pembesar refused to accept Raja Muhammad as the rightful heir to the throne. Tun Perak famously declared:

Nyiah! Nyiah kamu semua, nyiah kerana istiadat hamba Melayu tiada pernah derhaka. Tetapi akan anak raja seorang ini janganlah kita pertuan.

[Away, away, all of you! For by the custom of a Malay servant, I would never commit treason. But as for this particular prince, let us not acknowledge him as our lord.]

— Tun Perak, in Sulalatus Salatin

Sultan Mansur Shah subsequently exiled Raja Muhammad to Pahang, where he was installed as ruler instead. The episode demonstrates that dynastic descent alone did not guarantee succession, and that the pembesar held significant veto power in dynastic affairs.

The foundations of Malacca's administrative framework were traditionally established during the reign of Parameswara. The Sulalatus Salatin records that Parameswara appointed four pembesar to oversee the initial settlement, forty bentara to carry out royal commands, and forty biduanda kecil to serve the royal household. This early framework laid the groundwork for the more complex Pembesar Empat Lipatan system that developed in later decades.

The Malaccan social and administrative order was structured as follows:

Social class hierarchy during Malacca Sultanate
Types	Class Name		Members	Notes
Golongan pemerintah (ݢولوڠن ڤمرينته) (Rulling class)	Monarch		Sultan (سلطان) (King)	The supreme ruler of the kingdom, whose authority and decrees were absolute.
Golongan pemerintah (ݢولوڠن ڤمرينته) (Rulling class)	Upper class	Pembesar Empat Lipatan (ڤمبسر امڤت ليڤتن) or Orang Kaya-kaya (اورڠ كاي٢) (Note: Pembesar Empat Lipatan refers to the structure of the social hierarchy, whereas Orang Kaya-kaya denotes the title held by members of that class.)	Pembesar Berempat (ڤمبسر برامڤت); Pembesar Berlapan (ڤمبسر برلاڤن); Pembesar Berenam Belas (ڤمبسر برانم بلس); Pembesar Bertiga Puluh Dua (ڤمبسر برتيڬ ڤولوه دوا)	This elite class comprised high-ranking officials such as ministers, military commanders, diplomats, and other key figures involved in governance and administration. They were regarded as the highest tier within the noble class (golongan bangsawan).
Kerabat diraja (قرابت دراج) (Royal family)	Upper class	Royalty Class	Sultanah (سلطانه) (Queen consort); Gundik (ڬونديق) (Sultan's secondary wife) (Note: Islam permits polygamy. In this context, the Gundiks are the monarch's officially recognised secondary wives.); Putera Raja (ڤوترا راج) (Royal Prince); Puteri Raja (ڤوتري راج) (Royal Princess); Kerabat Diraja (كرابت دراج) (Royalty)	This social group comprised the Sultanah, the gundik-gundik (secondary wives), the Sultan's children and other close relatives. Although members of the royal household possessed considerable influence through their proximity to the throne, membership of the royal household did not in itself confer formal administrative authority. The Pembesar Empat Lipatan held the principal administrative offices of the Sultanate. Members of the royal family could, however, be appointed to these offices and thereby exercise the authority associated with them.
Golongan diperintah (ݢولوڠن دڤرينته) (Governed subjects)	Upper class	Scholarly Class	Cerdik pandai (چرديق ڤنداي) (Intellectual/Scholar); Pendeta (ڤندتا) or 'Alim (عاليم) (Religious scholar); Pujangga (ڤوجڠڬ) (Literary scholar)	This respected group included religious scholars, intellectuals, legal experts, and teachers who were responsible for educating the royal family and advising the Sultan and royal court on religious and legal matters. Their offices were located within the royal palace, and they were regarded as part of the noble class (golongan bangsawan).
Golongan diperintah (ݢولوڠن دڤرينته) (Governed subjects)	Upper class	Lower Upper Class	Ceteria (چيتيريا) (Royal guard); Hulubalang (هولوبالڠ) (Knight/Warlord); Penghulu (ڤڠهولو) (Town lord); Bentara (بنتارا) (Note: During the Malacca Sultanate, Bentara was a term roughly translated as "servant". Typically, Bentaras were sons of aristocrats trained for future roles in either the military or civil administration. Depending on their path and status, they could be promoted to Hulubalang (knight or warlord) or Penghulu (town lord). If born into a Pembesar Empat Lipatan family and designated as an heir, they could advance further within the noble hierarchy. The role of Bentara had no direct equivalent in European feudal society, though functionally they combined aspects of a squire, herald, and serjeant-at-arms. Depending on age and duties, they could be likened to either a European squire or page. Bentaras often served as heralds and were frequently sent on diplomatic missions to foreign courts, typically accompanied by the Laksamana.) (Squire and/or Herald and/or Serjeant-at-arms); Orang Kaya (اورڠ كاي) (lit. 'Noble person', a title that encompassed individuals of high social status, including members of aristocratic families who were part of the Pembesar Empat Lipatan)	This group wielded power, at least within their respective fields or through their connections, although not at the level of the royal court. While the Pembesar Empat Lipatan and the scholarly class served as the brains of the kingdom's administration, this group functioned as the arms or intermediaries who carried out tasks on behalf of the kingdom. They were regarded as the lowest tier within the noble class (golongan bangsawan).
Golongan diperintah (ݢولوڠن دڤرينته) (Governed subjects)	Istanawan (ايستانوان) (Royal households)		Dayang (دايڠ) (Lady-in-waiting and/or Lady's companion); Penghulu Inang (ڤڠهولو اينڠ) (Head of palace servants); Inang (اينڠ) (Royal nanny and/or female palace servant); Sida (سيدا) (Male palace retainer); Biduanda Kecil (بيدواندا کچيل) (Note: During the Malacca Sultanate, Biduanda was also translated as "servant," similar to Bentara but with a much lower social status. They were typically not from local Malacca aristocracy and were tasked with serving the monarch, nobles, or hulubalangs (knights). Hamba Raja (royal slaves), often prisoners of war from enemy nobility, could be appointed as Biduanda if they swore loyalty to the Sultan, thereby escaping their status as royal slaves.) (Page)	Encompassing a variety of roles essential to the functioning of the royal palace.
Golongan diperintah (ݢولوڠن دڤرينته) (Governed subjects)	Tantara (تنتارا) (Warrior) Class		Pendekar (ڤنديکر) (Skilled warrior); Lasykar (لشكر) (Soldier); Penjurit (ڤنجوريت) (Mercenary)	Professionally trained combatants and military personnel.
Golongan diperintah (ݢولوڠن دڤرينته) (Governed subjects)	Commoner Class		Kiwi (کيوي) (Merchant and/or trader); Farmer; Fisherman; Craftsman; Freemen; Townspeople; Villager; Peasant	The backbone of the sultanate's economy. Under the serah dan kerah (سراه دان كراه) system, commoners could be conscripted to serve as Lasykar (لشكر) (soldier) during times of war, temporarily stepping away from their civilian roles to bolster the sultanate's military forces.
Golongan diperintah (ݢولوڠن دڤرينته) (Governed subjects)	No class	Hamba (همبا) (Slave)	Hamba Raja (همبا راج) (Royal Slaves) (Note: Hamba Raja translates to "slave owned by the King". This status was typically assigned to criminals from the kingdom's aristocracy or prisoners of war from enemy royal or noble families. They held a higher status than other slaves and were under the Sultan's protection.); Hamba Berhutang (همبا برهوتڠ) (Serfs and/or In-debt Slaves) (Note: Individuals who became enslaved to settle debts); Hamba (همبا) or Abdi (عبدي) (Ordinary Slaves)	The lowest tier in the hierarchy.

• All writings in the Jawi script represent official titles that use classical Malay vocabulary (kosakata klasik).

• All the examples above are singular. In plural form, for instance, Kerabat Diraja ( كرابت دراج) becomes Kerabat-kerabat Diraja ( كرابت٢ دراج), and Dayang ( دايڠ) becomes Dayang-Dayang ( دايڠ٢).

==== Yamtuan ====
In the context of feudal Malay kingdoms, the Yamtuan (يمتوان) served as a regent appointed by the Sultan to govern a distant colony or territory within the empire, particularly those located far from the kingdom's administrative centre. The appointment of a Yamtuan was typically reserved for individuals of high status and unwavering loyalty to the crown, often drawn from the Sultan's immediate family, close relatives, or members of the Pembesar Berempat.

These outlying territories replicated the social and administrative structure of the central kingdom, with the Yamtuan functioning as the Sultan's representative at the local level. The Yamtuan was entrusted with governance, civil administration, and the enforcement of royal decrees, ensuring that the Sultan's authority remained intact across the empire.

The term Yamtuan, a contraction of Yang di-Pertuan (يڠ دڤرتوان), may be translated as "He who is appointed as the lord". In historical usage, titles such as Yamtuan Pahang (يمتوان ڤهڠ) denoted an individual appointed by the Sultan to rule over Pahang, effectively serving as a viceroy or provincial monarch.

In contemporary Malaysia, the title retains both cultural and political relevance. The Yamtuan Besar Negeri Sembilan (يمتوان بسر نݢري سمبيلن), for instance, translates as "He who is appointed as the High Lord of Negeri Sembilan". This title reflects the state's unique system of monarchy, wherein the Yamtuan Besar is selected by the Undangs (اوندڠ), the hereditary kings of the constituent territories, known as Luaks (Classical Malay: Luhak لوهق). (Note: Negeri Sembilan is a federation formed by unifying nine kingdoms known as Luak(s), each led by a king called Undang. In 1808, the Undang of the Luak Tanah Mengandung was appointed as their chief, becoming the "king of kings.")

Similarly, the national title Yang di-Pertuan Agong (يڠ دڤرتوان اݢوڠ) translates as "He who is appointed as the Supreme Lord". It refers to Malaysia's constitutional monarch and head of state, who is elected on a rotational basis by the Conference of Rulers (Majlis Raja-Raja; مجليس راج٢).

== Roles and responsibilities of Malay nobility in traditional Malay kingdoms ==
Maintenance of peace and security

Nobles were entrusted by the monarch with the responsibility of safeguarding their respective territories or fiefs. They held the authority to maintain peace, enforce laws, and defend their domains from external threats. In return, they were expected to ensure the loyalty of all individuals under their jurisdiction, including subordinate nobles and commoners, to the reigning monarch.

Administrative functions

The nobility formed the backbone of the kingdom's administrative apparatus. High-ranking nobles, such as the Pembesar Berempat and Pembesar Berlapan, held senior ministerial roles. These included the Bendahara (Prime minister), Laksamana (Chief of Naval and Diplomatic Affairs), Qadhi (Minister of Legal Affairs), Penghulu Bendahari (Minister of Finance), and Seri Bija Diraja (General of the Army), each responsible for vital aspects of governance.

Lesser nobles administered local affairs, including the management of districts and smaller settlements within their fiefs. This layered arrangement enabled effective decentralised governance while maintaining coherence with the central authority.

Advisory role to the monarch

Nobles served as key advisers to the monarch, particularly through their participation in the royal advisory council. They were consulted on governance, policy formulation, and judicial matters. Their counsel provided alternative perspectives that often helped refine royal decisions and contributed to effective and balanced statecraft.

Military leadership

Through a system known as serah dan kerah (Jawi: سراه دان كراه), nobles were required to mobilise their subjects for military service during times of conflict. They functioned as military commanders, leading forces raised from their own territories in the service of the monarch. This system bore similarities to feudal military levies found in other regions, such as in medieval Japan.

Diplomatic representation

Nobles frequently undertook diplomatic responsibilities on both domestic and international fronts. Within the kingdom, they accompanied the monarch during regional visits, providing security and ceremonial presence. On foreign missions, they served as envoys representing the ruler. For instance, the Laksamana is historically recorded as having travelled to India, China, the Ottoman Empire, and Japan. These missions, documented in sources such as the Malay Annals, Hikayat Hang Tuah, and Rekidai Hōan, played an important role in maintaining diplomatic relations and projecting the kingdom's influence abroad.

Preservation of traditions and cultural practices

The nobility played a central role in safeguarding and perpetuating the cultural identity of the kingdom. Senior nobles were key participants in royal ceremonies and functioned as official witnesses during significant state events. They were also responsible for transmitting news and decrees from the palace to the general populace. Lesser nobles acted as guardians of local traditions and customs within their fiefs, ensuring the continuity of cultural practices and reinforcing societal cohesion.

Ceremonial duties and court protocol

Each noble was assigned a specific ceremonial function within the palace. The Bendahara served as the master of ceremonies and custodian of royal regalia, ensuring protocol was properly observed. The Penghulu Bendahari oversaw the arrangement of the royal hall and the preparation of royal meals. The Temenggong organised palace banquets and assigned ceremonial roles to participants. These coordinated duties ensured that palace events were executed with grandeur and precision, enhancing the prestige of the monarchy.

Tax collection and economic administration

Taxation was a fundamental element of the kingdom's economy. Nobles were authorised to collect taxes from the territories under their control. In larger fiefs, this duty was often delegated to subordinate officials such as the Penghulu or Penggawa (Jawi: ڤڠڬوا). (Note: The term Penggawa is literally translated as Team Leader. In feudal Malay kingdoms, it became an official title and position held by lower-ranking nobles who were appointed by the monarch or fief lord to oversee tax collection.) Nobles retained a portion of the collected revenue to sustain themselves and manage their local administrations, as they did not receive fixed salaries from the crown.

In matters of international commerce, the Syahbandar (harbourmaster) regulated port activities and collected levies from foreign merchants. Operating under the supervision of the Penghulu Bendahari, the Syahbandar played a key role in securing the kingdom's fiscal health through the efficient administration of maritime trade.

Tribute to the monarch

A portion of the revenue collected by nobles was formally submitted to the monarch as tribute, known in Malay as serahan (Jawi: سراهن). This act symbolised loyalty and reaffirmed the monarch's supreme authority over all fiefs within the realm.

Provision of labour for state projects

Under the serah dan kerah system, nobles were also obliged to supply labour for state projects. Workers from their territories were deployed for the construction of royal palaces, fortifications, roads, and other public works. This obligation was considered a civic duty and was performed without financial compensation.

Judicial responsibilities

Nobles served as local magistrates within their domains. They enforced codified legal systems such as the Undang-Undang Melaka (Jawi: اوندڠ٢ ملاك), alongside Islamic legal principles. Nobles had the authority to impose penalties for various offences. However, cases involving capital punishment required the monarch's direct approval. This judicial function reinforced the nobles' role as upholders of law, order, and morality within society.

Intermediaries between the monarch and the people

Nobles acted as crucial intermediaries between the monarch and the populace. They conveyed royal decrees, policies, and announcements to the people and ensured they were properly implemented. Conversely, they also communicated the concerns, grievances, and needs of the people to the royal court. This bidirectional flow of information was essential for maintaining social stability and fostering trust between the ruler and the ruled.

== Present-day roles of the Malay nobility ==
In the modern era, particularly in Malay kingdoms where monarchies and traditional noble systems are still preserved, most noble titles serve ceremonial purposes. However, in several kingdoms, titled nobles continue to hold formal roles in constitutional and state affairs, especially in matters concerning royal succession.

For example, in 2008, following the death of Tuanku Ja'afar, the tenth Yang di-Pertuan Besar of Negeri Sembilan, the Undangs, who govern the smaller constituent territories of the state, exercised their traditional authority to elect a new ruler from among the eligible royal candidates. In the Selangor Sultanate, the Laws of the Constitution of Selangor 1959 (Undang-Undang Tubuh Negeri Selangor 1959) require that any succession to the throne must be approved by the Selangor Council of the Royal Court (Dewan Diraja Selangor). This council consists of 22 members, including five hereditary nobles (Malay: Orang-orang Besar) who play a significant constitutional role. Their involvement serves to prevent succession disputes, disqualify unsuitable candidates, (Note: Individuals deemed unsuitable—such as those with chronic illnesses, mental or psychological disorders, anger management issues, tyrannical behaviour, or who have renounced Islam—are not eligible.) and ensure that no individual is installed before attaining the minimum required age.

A comparable process is practised in the Pahang Sultanate, where the Undang-Undang Tubuh Kerajaan Pahang 1948 (Pahang State Constitution 1948) stipulates that royal succession must receive the endorsement of the royal council before a new monarch may be appointed.

In the contemporary Brunei Sultanate, the noble hierarchy remains active and retains a clear distinction between hereditary and non-hereditary titles. The principal noble classes are Wazir, Cheteria, and Manteri. The titles in Wazir class are non-hereditary and typically reserved for senior members of the royal family. The Cheteria class consists of hereditary nobles recognised for their distinguished service to the state, whereas the Manteri titles are non-hereditary and are conferred upon ministers, senior civil servants, and other individuals who serve the interests of the sultanate.

== Hereditary and non-hereditary titles in the Malay nobility ==
Although systems of Malay peerage differ across various kingdoms, they share fundamental similarities with the feudal traditions found in both Europe and Asia. In general, noble titles within the Malay world may be classified as either hereditary or non-hereditary.

=== Hereditary titles ===
Hereditary titles are positions granted by the monarch to individuals who have pledged loyalty to the sovereign, with the right to pass these titles on to their descendants. Such titles are typically inherited through the male line upon the death of the original holder. In many cases, the conferment of a hereditary title included the grant of a territory or fief within the kingdom, which the noble was tasked with administering, maintaining, and defending on behalf of the monarch.

Once conferred, hereditary titles generally remain within the family unless revoked due to serious misconduct, the extinction of the male lineage, or the complete disappearance of the family.

=== Non-hereditary titles ===
Non-hereditary titles are not passed on to descendants. These honours expire upon the death of the holder and are returned to the monarch, who may subsequently bestow them upon another suitable individual. Such titles are typically awarded in recognition of distinguished service and are held only for the lifetime of the recipient.

In many Malay monarchies, royal titles are also considered non-hereditary and are reserved for close members of the royal family. These titles, while high-ranking and prestigious, are not inherited and are instead conferred as personal honours. For instance, upon ascending the throne of Pahang in 2019, Tengku Abdullah bestowed royal titles upon his children and his stepmother, the former Queen consort of Pahang. Although these titles were of significant rank, they were non-hereditary and ceased upon the holder's death.

A similar example occurred in Johor, where Sultan Ibrahim Iskandar declared that no successor would be appointed to bear the title Tunku Laksamana Johor following the death of his son, Tunku Abdul Jalil, from cancer. When Sultan Ibrahim established the Tunku Laksamana Johor Cancer Foundation in 2016, he announced that the title would be retired in honour of his late son.

== Malay peerage systems still in use today ==
As a result of colonisation, political upheaval, and modernisation, many traditional Malay peerage systems have become extinct. Nevertheless, several have endured and remain in use today, particularly in regions where Malay monarchies continue to exist. The following is a list of surviving Malay peerage systems:

Peerage	Kingdom	Notes
Peerage of Brunei	Brunei Sultanate	The kingdom was founded around the 6th century. Its present peerage system was established in the 16th century as a result of diplomatic relations with the Malacca Sultanate and later the Johor Sultanate. Although the system underwent major changes with the introduction of the Wazir, Cheteria, and Manteri classes, it continued to be based on the Pembesar Empat Lipatan as its core structure.
Peerage of Deli	Deli Sultanate	The Deli Sultanate was established in the 17th century as a vassal state of the Aceh Sultanate. Influenced by surrounding major kingdoms, it adopted the Malaccan system of nobility. The Deli Sultanate was among the few Indonesian monarchies that were not formally abolished under Dutch rule in the Dutch East Indies. However, it was officially dissolved in 1946 during the socialist movement led by Sukarno. Despite this, elements of the royal institution continued to be observed quietly by the local population, and in recent years, efforts have been made to revive it in a ceremonial capacity.
Peerage of Kedah	Kedah Sultanate	The kingdom was established around the 4th century. Its present peerage system was formalised in the 15th century following diplomatic and trade relations with the Malacca Sultanate. Kedah is one of three kingdoms that have preserved the Malaccan nobility system in its purest form, with only minor alterations.
Peerage of Negeri Sembilan	Negeri Sembilan royal institution (Note: There are currently fourteen minor kingdoms, known as Luak(s), in Negeri Sembilan, each possessing its own distinct system of peerage.)	Negeri Sembilan possesses the most unique and complex monarchy system in Malaysia. Its current peerage combines the mandala system with elements of the Malaccan nobility system. Originally a federation of nine small kingdoms known as Luak, the rulers of these Luak would elect one among them to serve as the Yang di-Pertuan Besar, or king of kings. Formerly a colony of the Malacca Sultanate, Negeri Sembilan declared its independence from the Johor Sultanate, which succeeded the Malacca Sultanate, in the 18th century and eventually formed a formal federation in the 19th century. Each Luak within Negeri Sembilan maintains its own distinct peerage system.
Peerage of Pahang	Pahang Sultanate	The kingdom was established in the 5th century and was conquered by the Malacca Sultanate in the 15th century. Prior to that, it was known as Inderapura, a kingdom consisting of settlers from the Siamese region. It later became a colony of the Malacca Sultanate, and a prince from the Malaccan royal family was typically appointed as the Yamtuan (Viceroy) of Pahang, thereby introducing the Malaccan nobility system to the region. The territory was later elevated to the status of a vassal state after an exiled Malaccan prince, Raja Muhammad, founded the Old Pahang kingdom. Following the fall of Malacca in 1511, Pahang became a vassal state of the Johor Sultanate. In 1770, it gained independence from Johor. Pahang is one of three kingdoms that have preserved the Malaccan nobility system in its most authentic form, with only minor modifications.
Peerage of Perak	Perak Sultanate	The kingdom was established in the 15th century as a colony of the Malacca Sultanate and was later elevated to the status of a vassal state in 1528. During its time as a colony, a prince from the Malaccan royal family was typically appointed as the Yamtuan of Perak and, following its elevation, as the monarch of the vassal state. Today, the monarch of this kingdom is the only ruler with a direct lineage to the Sultan of Malacca. After the Portuguese conquest of Malacca, the Sultan and his royal family retreated to Johor and established a rump state known as the Johor Sultanate, to which Perak became a vassal. In the 17th century, Raja Sulong, a descendant of the Sultan of Malacca, was enthroned as Sultan of Perak following the death of his cousin, Sultan Salehuddin of Perak, and the royal family due to a cholera epidemic. (Note: At that time, Perak was struck by a cholera epidemic. The Sultan of Perak, Sultan Salehuddin, brought his family to Riau, within the Johor Sultanate, in an attempt to isolate themselves from the outbreak. Unfortunately, he and his royal family did not survive and died in Kampar, Riau.) Perak is one of three kingdoms that have preserved the Malaccan nobility system in its most authentic form, with only minor modifications.
Peerage of Sarawak	Raj of Sarawak	Sarawak is a unique case in Malaysia. Although it no longer has a monarchy, the region has preserved the nobility system of its earlier kingdoms. Originally a colony under the Brunei Sultanate, Sarawak was granted to James Brooke in the 19th century in recognition of his efforts in suppressing rebellion and piracy. He was subsequently proclaimed ruler by the Sultan of Brunei and established the Raj of Sarawak. To gain the loyalty of the local population and prevent further uprisings, Brooke adopted the local Malacca-derived nobility system and recognised the existing Sarawak-Brunei nobles as part of his new realm. Although the Raj of Sarawak was abolished following the Second World War and the region became a British Crown Colony, the nobility and peerage system continued to be maintained by the government.
Peerage of Selangor	Selangor Sultanate	The kingdom was established in the 16th century as a colony of the Malacca Sultanate. Following the fall of Malacca, it came under the control of the Johor Sultanate. In the 18th century, it gained independence from Johor with the assistance of the Perak Sultanate. Initially, the kingdom's peerage followed the Malacca nobility system. However, in the early 1880s, this was replaced with a British-style system upon the advice of Frank Swettenham, the British Resident of Selangor.
Peerage of Terengganu	Terengganu Sultanate	The kingdom was established in the 5th century by settlers from Champa. It was later conquered by the Malacca Sultanate in the 15th century and became one of its vassal states. After the fall of Malacca, the kingdom came under the control of the Johor Sultanate. In the 18th century, Tun Zainal Abidin, son of Tun Habib, the Bendahara of Johor, was appointed as the Yamtuan of Terengganu by Sultan Abdul Jalil IV. In the 1770s, Terengganu declared its independence from Johor. Initially, the kingdom's peerage followed the Malacca nobility system, but in 1911, during the reign of Sultan Zainal Abidin III, it was restructured into a British-style system following the advice of Arthur Henderson Young, the British Resident of Terengganu.

== Abolished traditional Malay peerage systems ==
Several traditional Malay peerage systems have been abolished over time, particularly during the colonial and post-independence periods. These systems, which once conferred genuine administrative and territorial authority, have largely been replaced by modernised honours and ceremonial titles. The contemporary systems, introduced primarily in the 20th century, retain symbolic value but no longer carry governing power or feudal responsibilities.

Peerage	Kingdom	Notes
Peerage of Kelantan	Kelantan Sultanate	The kingdom was established in the 16th century as a rump state of the Langkasuka Kingdom following its defeat by the Ayutthaya Kingdom. It initially adopted the Malaccan nobility system after becoming a vassal of the Kedah Sultanate in the 17th century. However, the peerage system was later changed to the Siamese nobility model in the early 19th century after the kingdom gained independence from the Terengganu Sultanate with assistance from the Rattanakosin Kingdom. One of the major nobles, Long Senik Mulut Merah, emerged victorious in civil war and ascended the throne. Upon taking power, he abolished the entire peerage and replaced it with government-appointed officials to administer the districts of Kelantan. In modern times, a new peerage structure has been reintroduced, although it is largely reserved for members of the royal family and senior state officials, such as the Menteri Besar.
Peerage of Modern Johor	Johor Sultanate (Temenggong dynasty)	Originally part of the Malacca Sultanate, the territory became a rump state of Malacca following its fall to the Portuguese. At the end of the 17th century, the last Sultan of Johor descended from the Sultan of Malacca, Sultan Mahmud Shah II, and was deemed unfit to rule due to his young age at the time of accession. He was eventually overthrown by his Bendahara, Tun Abdul Jalil, who ascended the throne and established the House of Bendahara. During the reign of these two royal houses, Johor continued to use the Malaccan nobility system. Following the Johor succession conflict from the 1870s to the 1880s, Wan Abu Bakar, then Temenggong of Johor and a descendant of Tun Abdul Jalil, was crowned as the new Sultan of Johor, founding the House of Temenggong. He subsequently abolished the traditional peerage system of Johor and replaced it with government-appointed officials to administer the districts of the kingdom. In modern times, a new peerage structure has been introduced, although it is primarily reserved for members of the royal family.
Peerage of Perlis	Kingdom of Perlis	The kingdom was established in the 19th century after gaining independence from the Kedah Sultanate with the assistance of the Rattanakosin Kingdom. Although it was formerly a colony of Kedah, it never adopted the Pembesar Empat Lipatan system. Following the formation of the Conference of Rulers in 1948, the kingdom began to introduce a peerage system based on the Malay nobility structure, though this system has since remained largely ceremonial in nature reserved for members of the royal family and senior state officials.
