= Flynas =

Low-cost airline in Saudi Arabia

Flynas طيران ناس

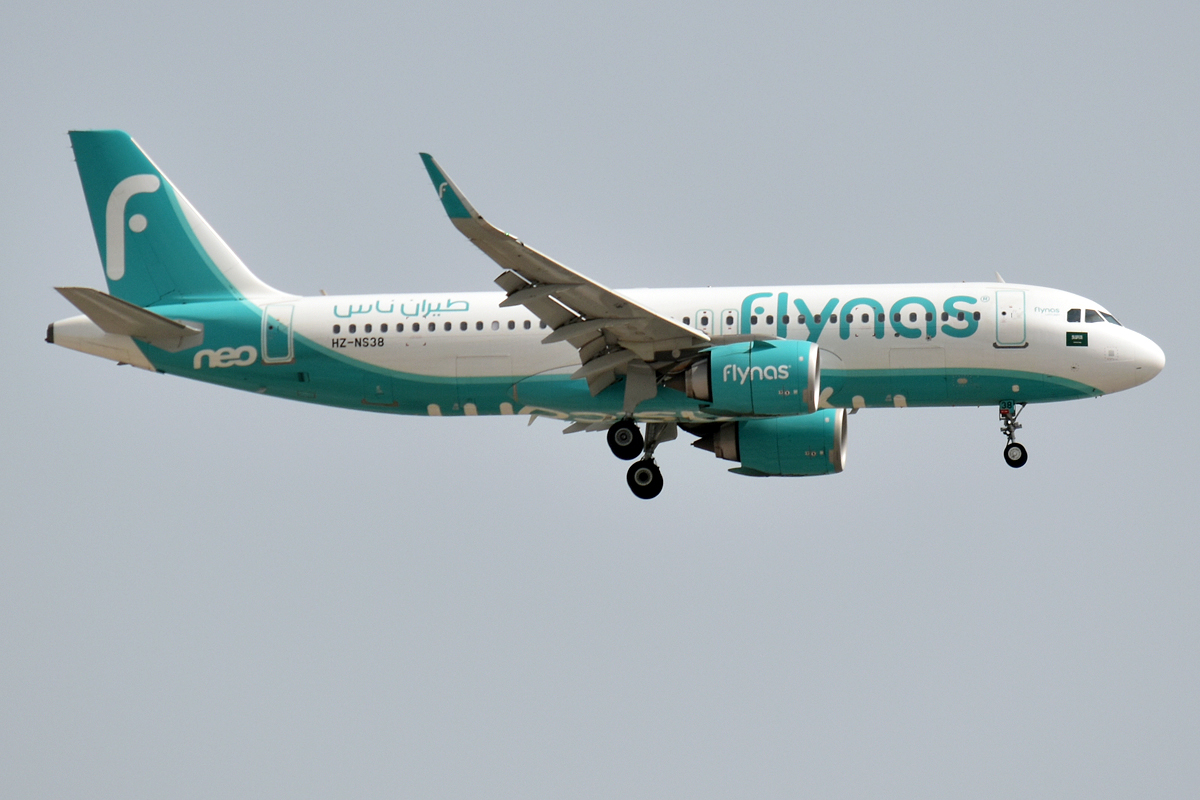
IATA	ICAO	Call sign
XY	KNE	FLYNAS
- Founded: 2007
- Commenced operations: February 25, 2007
- Operating bases: Abha; Dammam; Jeddah; Medinah; Riyadh
- Frequent-flyer program: Nasmiles
- Fleet size: 65
- Destinations: 88
- Parent company: National Air Services
- Headquarters: Riyadh, Saudi Arabia
- Key people: Ayed Al-Jeaid (chairman); Bander Al-Mohanna (CEO)
- Website: www.flynas.com

Flynas (stylized flynas; Arabic: طيران ناس), formerly Nas Air, is a private Saudi low-cost airline. It is the first low-cost airline in Saudi Arabia. The company's headquarters are located in Riyadh.

It operates more than 1,500 flights per week, which serve more than 70 domestic and international destinations in the Middle East, Asia, Europe and Africa.

Its operating bases are King Khalid International Airport in Riyadh, King Abdulaziz International Airport in Jeddah, King Fahd International Airport in Dammam and Prince Mohammad bin Abdulaziz International Airport in Madinah. Its fleet consists of 61 aircraft as of February 2025.

== History ==
Former logo from 2008 until 2013

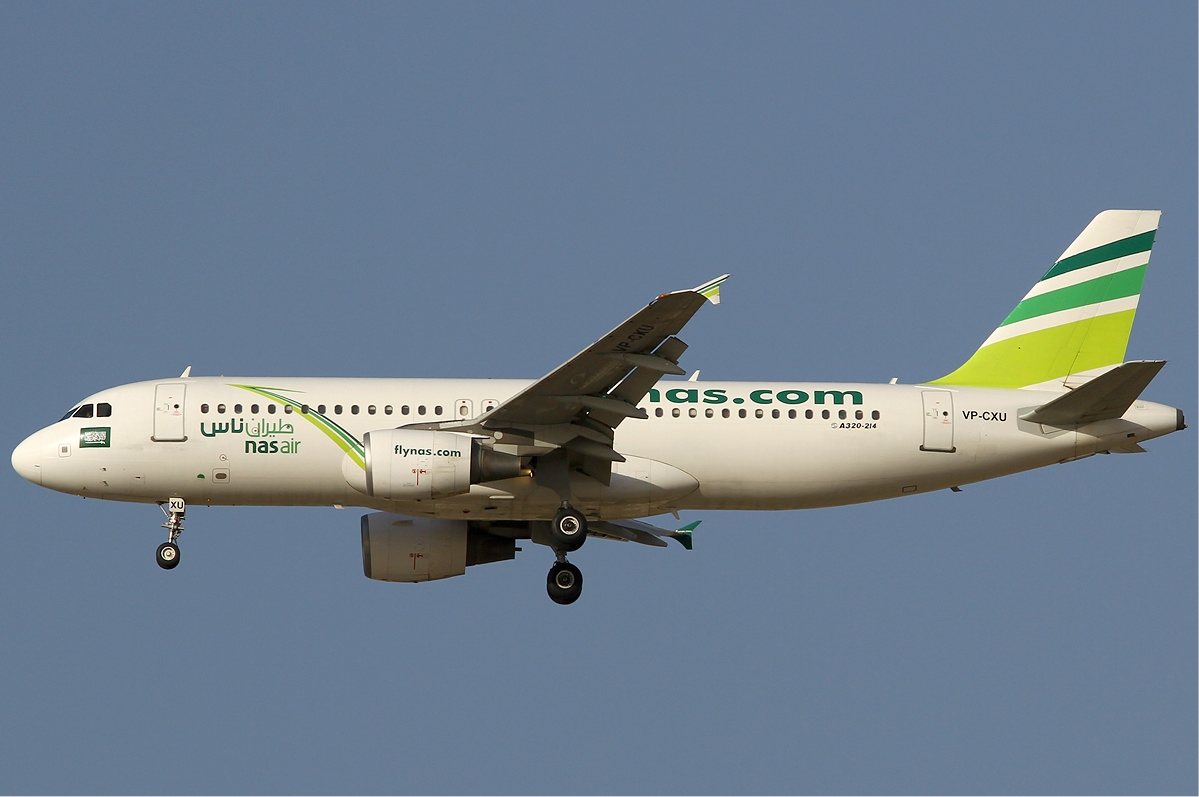
A Nas Air Airbus A320-200 in 2014

=== Nas Air ===
Saudi Arabian Airlines was the only airline in the country when budget carriers Nas Air and Sama Airlines got their licenses from the government. Nas Air was founded in 2007. Operations started on 25 February that year. In late 2007, Nas Air firmed up an order for 20 aircraft of the Airbus A320 family.

=== Flynas ===
The company changed its name from Nas Air to Flynas in November 2013. In January 2017, Flynas signed an agreement to order 80 Airbus A320neo family with deliveries scheduled from 2018 to 2026. In July 2017, the Flynas application on smart devices, iPhone and Android, achieved one million downloads of the application by users. In November 2018, Flynas took delivery of the first Airbus A320neo family aircraft. In June 2023, Flynas ordered 30 Airbus A320neo, taking the airline's total order with Airbus to 120 A320neo aircraft, including 10 A321XLR.

== Corporate affairs ==
As of September 2026, the Managing Director and CEO of Flynas is Bander Al-Mohanna, whose appointment took place in February 2015. the chairman position is held by Ayed Al Jeaid.

== Destinations ==
As of September 2023, Flynas served 54 destinations across 99 routes; the airline had Riyadh, Jeddah, Dammam, and Medinah as operating bases. As of September 2026, the number of destinations grew to more than 80, with the airline operating 156 routes across 38 countries.

Initial service to Assiut and Sharm el Sheikh in Egypt began in 2009, with flights to the latter initially operated on a seasonal basis. In 2011, the airline started services to three cities in Turkey: Adana, Antakya and Istanbul. Also that year, Lahore in Pakistan became the second city served in the country after Karachi. In February 2013, flights to Yanbu from Dammam were launched. Also that month, the airline started flying from Dammam to Khartoum, with the Sudanese capital becoming the airline's first international destination to be linked to that Saudi city.

In February 2014, Flynas introduced its Global Flight Routes program, aimed at offering affordable rates to passengers for flights between Jeddah and points in Africa, Asia and Europe, and at carrying religious tourists to Saudi Arabia. In March 2014, Flynas incorporated the first of three Airbus A330s the carrier would lease from Portugal's Hi Fly. These aircraft, including both the –200 and the –300 models, would be used to start medium-haul services. The airline also planned to add the Airbus A350 to its fleet for long-haul services.

Flynas became the first low-cost carrier to serve the Saudi Arabia-UK market when it launched the Jeddah–London Gatwick service, its first European long-haul route, in April 2014. Medium-haul routes to Karachi and Lahore were also planned, along with long-haul services to Jakarta, Kuala Lumpur, Casablanca, Manchester and Islamabad. Flights to Iran were also due to commence by the same time. Manchester became the airline's second destination in the United Kingdom on 7 May 2014. Cairo was made part of the route network in June 2014, making the Egyptian capital the carrier's seventh destination in the country. The London-Gatwick–Riyadh sector would also be served from 27 July the same year. A month later, it was informed that services to Manchester would be discontinued in August 2014, just after three months of operations. That month, the Indian market was expected to be served for the first time with flights to Hyderabad, followed by Calicut in September 2014. Plans were also to serve France next as well as China, Philippines, Nigeria and South Africa later on. Flynas also expected to serve the US market in 2015. However, Manchester was removed from the carrier's list of destinations in early August 2014, and in October of the same year, the airline announced the cancellation of most of its long- and medium-haul services owing to poor performance. Also in October 2014, Al-Qassim was incorporated to the route network.

At April 2015, Flynas' top three domestic routes in terms of available seats were Jeddah (JED)–Riyadh (RUH), Dammam (DMM)–RUH and JED–DMM. The carrier also performs Hajj services.

=== Codeshare agreements ===
Flynas has a codeshare agreement with following airlines:

- Ethiopian Airlines
- Etihad Airways
- Gulf Air
- Pegasus Airlines
- Turkish Airlines

In February 2020, Flynas joined the International Air Transport Association (IATA), which will help the company with "greater co-operation" with other member airlines and increase connectivity through codeshare agreements.

== Fleet ==
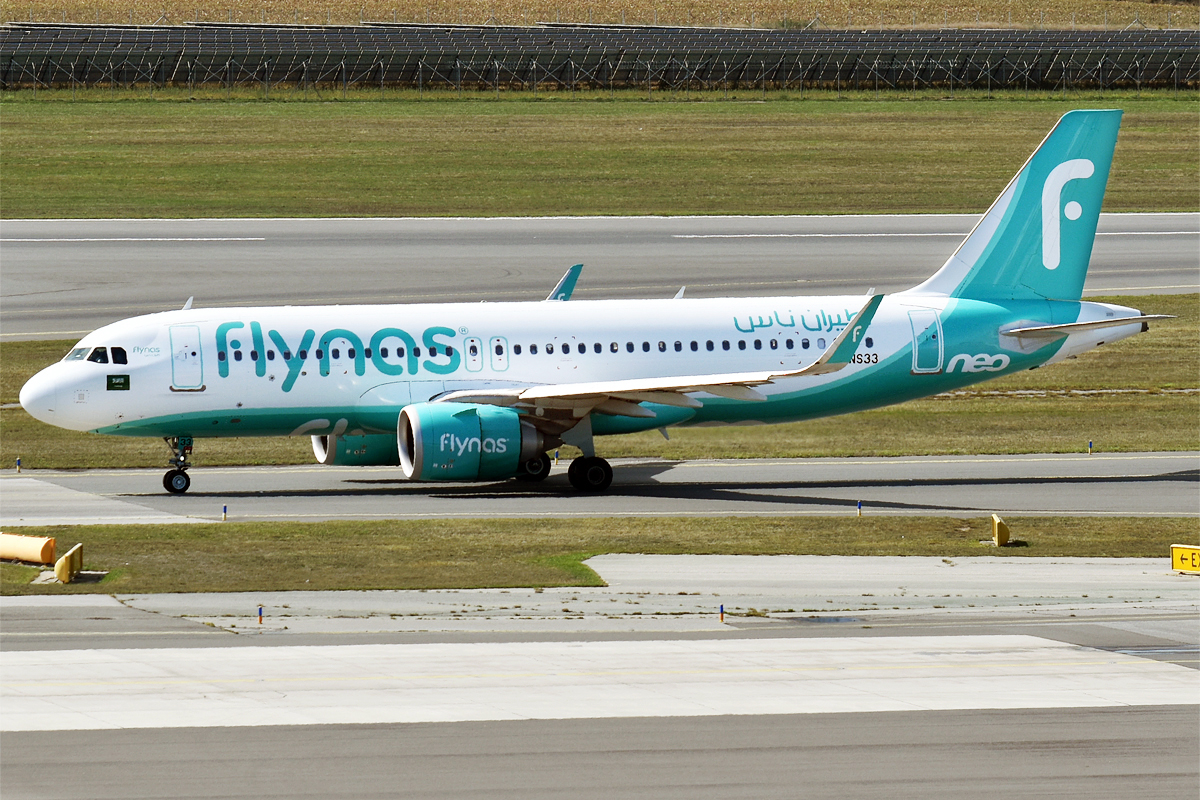
Flynas Airbus A320neo in 2022

=== Current fleet ===
As of November 2026, Flynas operates the following aircraft:

Flynas fleet
Aircraft	In service	Orders	Passengers	Notes
Airbus A320neo	64	159	174	
Airbus A321XLR	—	56	TBA	
Airbus A330-300	2	—	335	
Airbus A330-300	2	—	436	
Airbus A330-900	—	20	TBA	
Total	66	235		

=== Historic fleet ===
Throughout its history, Flynas and its predecessor, Nas Air, operated the following aircraft types:

- Airbus A319-100
- Airbus A320-200
- Airbus A330-200
- Boeing 747-400
- Boeing 767-300ER

== See also ==
- Transport in Saudi Arabia
