= Bandari (music project) =

Swiss new-age music project

- Origin: Au, Zürich, Switzerland
- Genre: New-age music
- Years active: 1989; 1994–present
- Label: AVC
- Members: Oliver Schwarz

Bandari is a new-age music project under the Swiss record label AVC. It was founded in 1989 and mainly produces ambient music and meditation music. The project is very well known in China, and their music is widely used as background music in Chinese TV programs and major public places. Their most famous songs include "Annie's Wonderland", "Snowdreams", "Moonglow", amongst others.

== History ==
In 1989, Peter Pozza, who was working in music at the MCS record company, founded the music project Bandari. According to his description, the name Bandari was "casually written down by me". He hired three members: Klaus Löhmer, Michael Rüßmann and Tom Astor to produce and release Bandari's first album "Zwischen Tag & Träum: Musik Zur Entspannung", but in 1991, the company went bankrupt, and Peter Pozza then founded AVC music company to take over the business of the previous company, with the newly formed company focusing on world music and classical compositions. For the first three years, AVC was busy with other projects, and Bandari remained on hold until 1994, when the project was revived and Oliver Schwarz became the project's leader and led the project's creation. In the following years, AVC released many Bandari albums in Switzerland and Germany, such as the album series "Reflections Vol. 1-5", "Zeit zum Träumen Vol. 1-8" and "Music For Relaxation Vol. 1-5", etc.

AVC began to investigate the Chinese music market early. As early as 1996, they released their first record in China through China Record Guangzhou Branch. In 1998, they cooperated with Jingo Records and let Jingo Records distribute a series of records. These albums unexpectedly achieved huge success in China and won Bandari a large number of Chinese fans. Later in 2005, AVC also put many of Bandari's series of music albums on digital music websites such as Apple music and Spotify.

== Artistry ==
According to Peter Pozza's own description, when he founded Bandari, he hoped to play a kind of "quiet, contemplative, and relaxing" popular music. Bandari is famous for its soothing, ethereal music style. They have been described as "the natural sound of the Alps", "like the gentle sea breeze of summer, like the silent spring rain that moistens things, with the almost perfect natural sound of nature". In addition to performing works composed by the project members themselves, they also performed covers of some famous pop songs. Bandari's later albums underwent some "artistic processing", such as adding the sound of running water and wind, which gave listeners a feeling of being in nature, and the style was more inclined to Celtic music.

== Legacy ==
Bandari is almost unknown in its homeland Switzerland, but has achieved great success in China. As of 2013, Bandari's record sales in China are about 1 million, not including a large number of pirated albums. They are regarded as representatives of New Age music by Chinese music fans along with Vangelis, Yanni and others. Their music is often used by Chinese people to relax and relieve stress. Many drivers said they like to play Bandari's songs while driving, and many pregnant women also listen to Bandari's songs as prenatal education music. In addition, Chinese TV programs and advertisements, as well as public places such as airports, schools, and parks, all use Bandari's songs as background music.

== Controversy ==
Since Bandari is almost unknown outside China, many Chinese Bandari music fans want to search for Bandari's foreign language information, but find that it is almost impossible to find it. This made "what exactly is Bandari" initially a mystery to many Bandari fans. Some fans believed that Bandari was a lie concocted by Taiwanese record label Jingo Records and didn't actually exist.

On the other hand, Bandari was also falsely promoted as a band that "hides in the mountains of the Alps", which raised a lot of questions. Peter Pozza himself refuted these rumors, stating that most of Bandari's songs are produced in recording studios in Germany. "Musicians don't necessarily have to hide in the forest to create music."

== Members ==
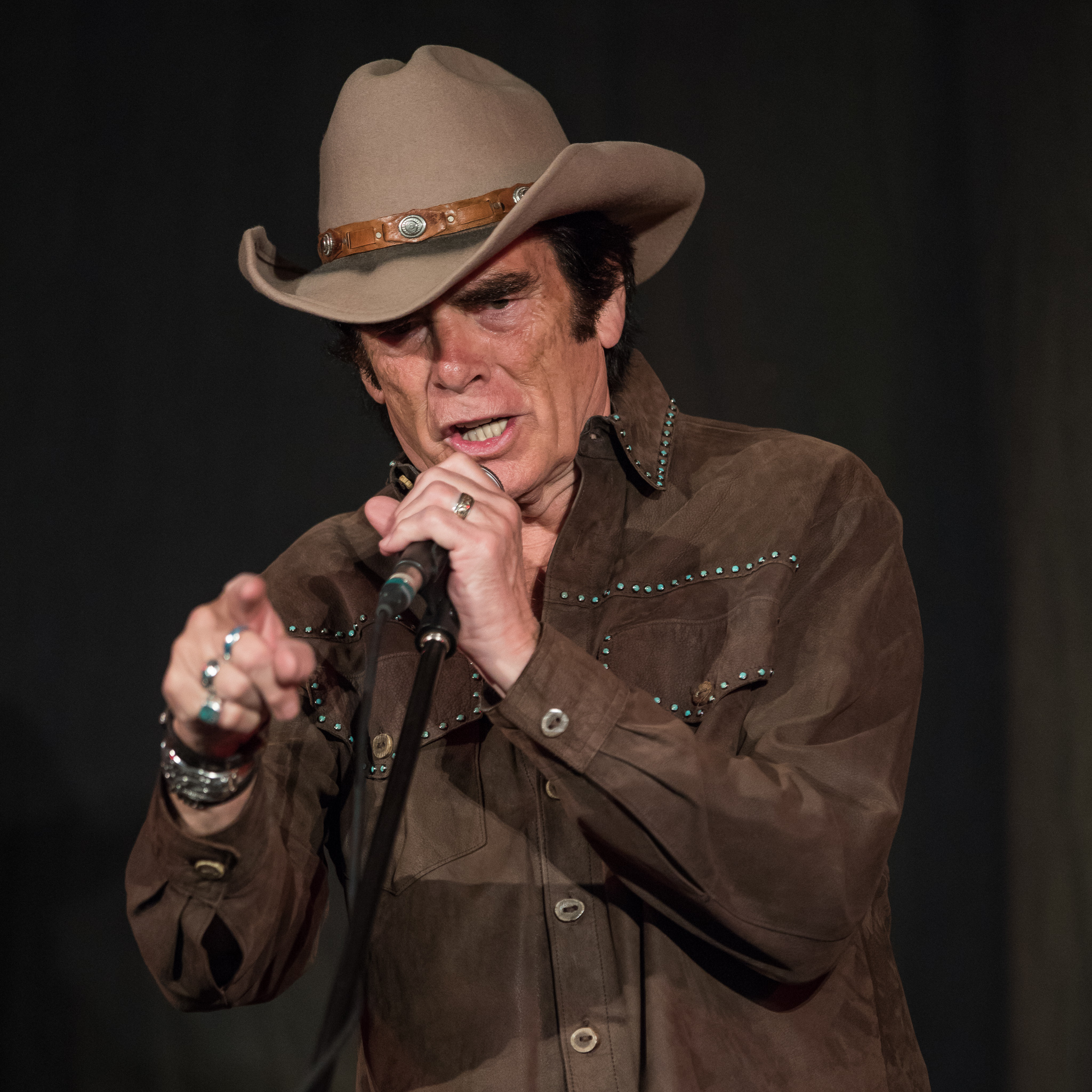
Tom Astor

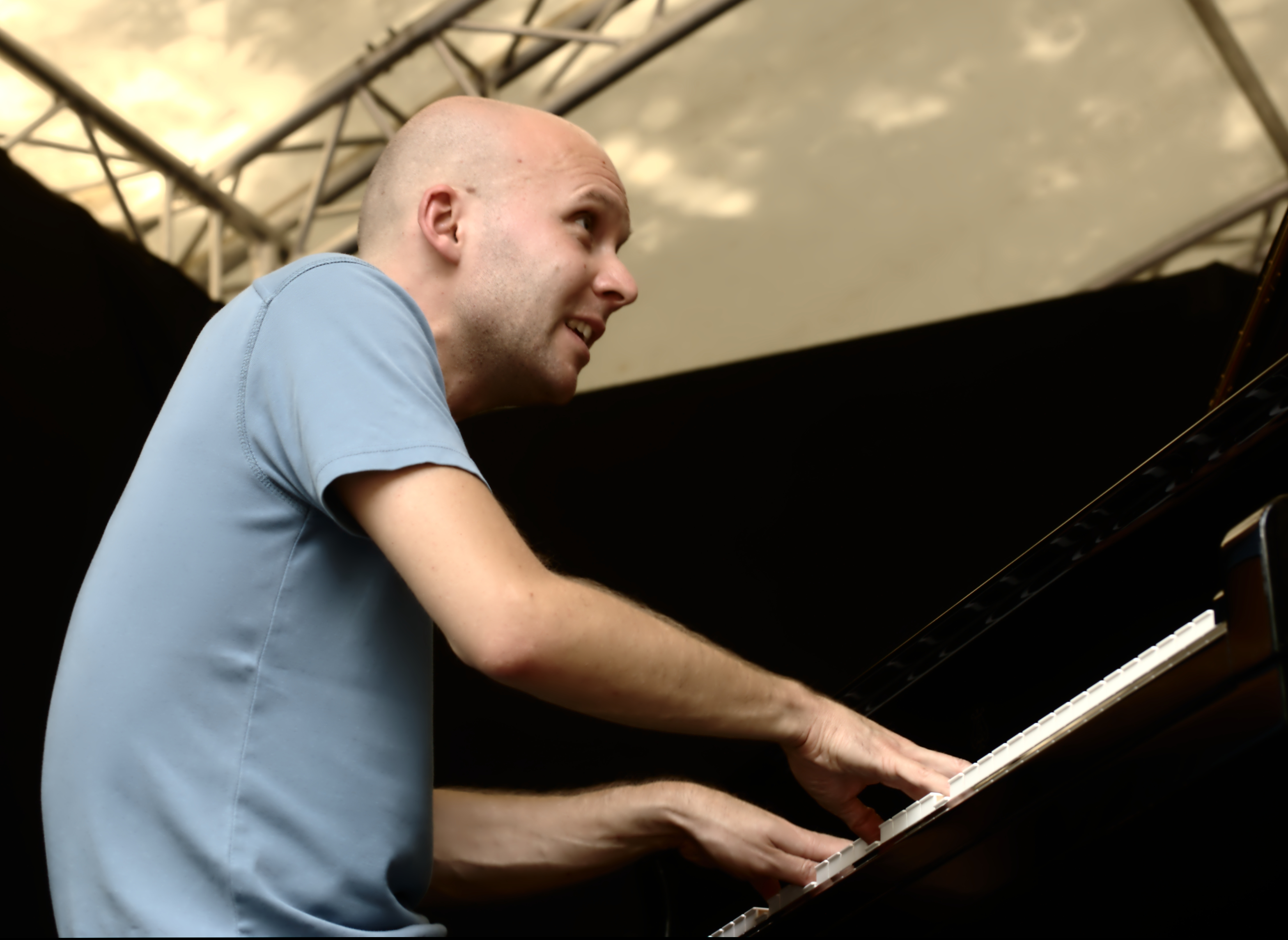
Carsten Daerr

- Oliver Schwarz
- Klaus Löhmer
- Detlef Blanke
- Hagen Hartung
- Tom Astor
- Felix Ernst
- Udo Hilwerling
- Christian Reddeker
- Arno Höddinghaus
- Oliver Thöne
- Evelin Stekla
- Uwe Kepper
- Anja Schwarz
- Michael Rüßmann
- Lars Hess
- Thomas Heinecke
- Michael Koch
- Michael Driesner
- Michael Cramtu
- Damian Luca
- Carsten Daerr

== Discography ==
=== Albums released in Europe ===
AVC has released a small number of albums in Europe and South America. Their physical discs are rare, and some albums have been released on music streaming platforms. Since The Best of Meditation album series, AVC has started releasing all new albums on streaming music platforms such as Apple Music and Spotify.

- Zwischen Tag & Traum: Musik Zur Entspannung (1989)
- Reflections - Zeit Zum Träumen (1994-1995, total 5 albums)
- Zeit Zum Träumen (1995-1996, total 8 albums)
- Music for Relaxation (1997-1998, total 5 albums)
- Silence - Music - Harmony - Inspiration (1998-1999, total 3 albums)
- The Best of New Age (2001)
- Celtic Christmas (2001)
- The Best of Meditation（2003）
- Summerdreams (2004)
- Relaxation (2008，total 10 albums)
- Peace on Earth (2023)
- Blue Mountain (2023)
- Children of Atlantis (2023)
- Relaxation - In Tune with Nature (2023)

=== Albums released in China ===
The following are their most common and best-selling albums, released by Jingo Records or Singo Records.

- Wonderland (1998)
- Silence with Sound from Nature (1998)
- One Day in Spring (1998)
- Heaven Blue (1998)
- Mist (1999)
- Sunny Bay (2000)
- Garden of Dreams (2001)
- Crystal Lake (2002)
- Breezy Valley (2003)
- Moonlight Bay (2004)
- Mistyland (2006)
- Emerald Valley (2007)
- Sunrise Hill (2009)
- Bandari 20th Anniversary Collection (2010)
- Chinese Poem (2015)
- The Island Was Glitter with Stars (2016)
- The Lost Piece Of (2021)
