= Penghulu =

Local leader in Brunei, Indonesia and Malaysia

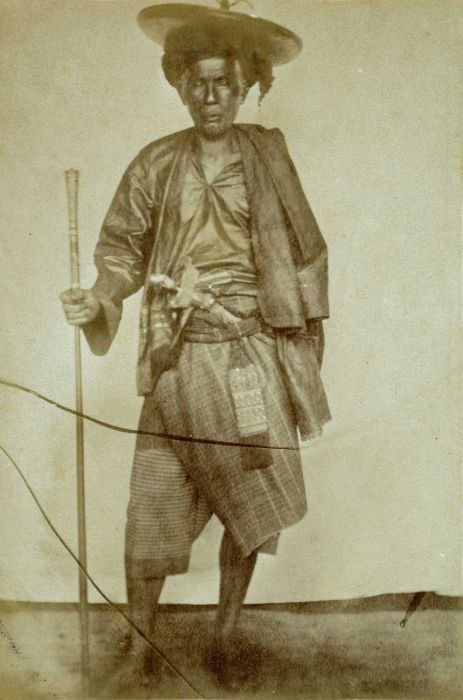
Portrait of a penghulu from a Royal Netherlands Geographical Society expedition to Central Sumatra (now in Indonesia) in the late 19th century (photo by D.D. Veth)

Penghulu (Jawi: ڤڠهولو; also romanised as pěnghulu) is a traditional title for a headman or chief in Malay-speaking societies throughout the Malay Archipelago. Historically, the term referred to the leader of a region or community. In contemporary usage, penghulu denotes a local administrative leader in Brunei, Indonesia, and Malaysia, typically overseeing a small territorial subdivision such as a mukim or village.

== Etymology ==
The word penghulu is derived from the agentive prefix peng- and the root word hulu, meaning "head". It is commonly translated as "headman" and, in the Malay context, refers to "one who is at the top" or a "leader". The term is cognate with the Tagalog word pangulo, which is the official title of the President of the Philippines.

According to Muhammad Hisyam, an Indonesian scholar and historian, in his 2005 article Potret Penghulu dalam Naskah, the origin of the word penghulu is rooted in the Malay language. In Java, the equivalent title is Kepala Negeri, while in the Riau region, it is known as Kepala Desa.

== History ==
The earliest known reference to the term penghulu appears in the Malay Annals, a literary work compiled in the 15th and 16th centuries. For example, the titles Penghulu Bendahari (literally "head of finance", akin to a modern finance minister) and Tun Perak as Penghulu of Kelang (equivalent to a town lord) indicate that the title denoted a significant rank within the traditional Malay hierarchy.

In the late 17th century, Minangkabau settlers who migrated to the region now known as Negeri Sembilan in present-day Malaysia began selecting their penghulus through a form of community voting. Over time, these local leaders amassed power, becoming de facto warlords and initiating territorial expansion. Eventually, nine principal penghulus emerged, each ruling over distinct territories. In 1773, amid the decline of the Johor Sultanate, these regions declared independence, and their leaders adopted the title Undang, effectively elevating themselves to sovereign rulers. Their territories were known as luak, and together they formed a loose confederation that came to be known as Negeri Sembilan, meaning "Nine States".

Due to subsequent warfare and territorial changes, only four of the original luak—Sungai Ujong, Jelebu, Johol, and Rembau—survive today as part of modern Negeri Sembilan. During the Padri War (1803–1837), several Undangs allied themselves with Dutch colonial authorities to combat Wahhabi-influenced Islamic extremism in the region.

A similar administrative role developed in Brunei during British colonial rule. The office of penghulu was introduced at the mukim (subdistrict) level to assist colonial authorities in governance and tax collection. Until the reign of Sultan Omar Ali Saifuddien III in the mid-20th century, individuals granted noble titles were often assigned to govern specific mukims, with appointments made at the discretion of the Sultan.

== Current usage ==
=== Brunei ===
In Brunei, penghulu is an administrative post and refers to the community leader of a mukim (Jawi: مقيم; subdistrict), which is the second-level administrative division below a district (Malay: Daerah) and comprises several villages (Malay: Kampung). Until 2015, the appointment of penghulu was determined by the District Office based on recommendations from members of the Mukim Consultative Council. Since 2015, the appointment process has been conducted through local elections, with citizens of each mukim aged 18 and above eligible to vote.

=== Indonesia ===
In Indonesia, penghulu currently refers, in certain regions, to a religious official or council responsible for managing Islamic religious affairs. The usage of the term in this context began during the period of Dutch East India Company (VOC) rule, when the traditional administrative functions of penghulu were assumed by colonial officers, except for religious duties, which remained under the purview of the penghulu. Over time, the term became closely associated with religious authority.

=== Malaysia ===
In modern Malaysia, similar to Brunei, penghulu is an administrative position and denotes the community leader of a mukim (subdistrict). Commonly referred to as Penghulu Mukim (ڤڠهولو مقيم) or Tok Penghulu (توء ڤڠهولو), the post is held by a government officer who serves under the District Officer and assists with governance at the subdistrict level. The penghulu represents the local government at the grassroots level and carries out both ceremonial and administrative functions. Ceremonial responsibilities include participating in events at the mukim level, while official duties involve overseeing development, administrative matters, and religious and cultural activities. This includes identifying, planning, monitoring, and implementing development projects within the mukim.

=== Philippines ===
In the Philippines, the cognate term pangulo is the Filipino word for "President", and is used as the official title for the head of state.

== See also ==
- Adat
- Malay nobility
