= Bandari (name) =

Bandari (Arabic: البندري,) is a feminine given name. It is also Telugu surname (Telugu: బండారి) of unrelated origin. Notable people with the name include:

== Given name ==
- Al Bandari Mobarak (born 2001), Saudi Arabian footballer
- Al Bandari bint Abdulaziz Al Saud (1928–2008), member of the Saudi royal family
- Al Bandari bint Abdul Rahman Al Saud (died 2019), member of the Saudi royal family

== Surname ==
- Jagadeesh Prathap Bandari (born 1993), Indian actor
- Jayamma Bandari (born c. 1978), Indian activist

== See also ==
- Bhandari
