= Shahbandar =

Title of port officials

Shahbandar (Persian: شاه‌بندر, lit. 'Harbourmaster'), was an official of the ports in Safavid Persia and one also known on other shores of the Indian Ocean. The Shahbandar (Port Master) was in charge of the traders and the collection of taxes.

The office of shahbandar first appeared in Persia, and from there spread throughout the Indian Ocean basin.

Later on, having become obsolete for the port towns of Persia, the term shahbandar was used for the official who represented the interests of the Turkish merchants operating within Persia.

In the Brunei Sultanate, Pengiran Shahbandar or Pengiran Indera Mahkota was the highest honour for a politician, reserved for the royal family.

== Malacca Sultanate ==
During the era of the Malacca Sultanate, the Shahbandar, also spelt Syahbandar, played a crucial role in managing port affairs. In addition to overseeing traders and collecting taxes from international merchants, the Shahbandar was responsible for enforcing maritime laws in accordance with the Undang-undang Laut Melaka (Jawi: اوندڠ٢ لاوت ملاك) (Maritime Laws of Malacca). At the height of the sultanate's power, four Shahbandars were appointed, each overseeing specific trading communities within the bustling port of Malacca:

- The first Shahbandar managed the affairs of Gujarati traders.
- The second Shahbandar oversaw traders from Southern India, Bengal, Burma, and Pasai.
- The third Shahbandar was responsible for traders from Maritime Southeast Asia.
- The fourth Shahbandar handled traders from Annam, China, and the Ryukyu Islands.

In the Malay nobility system, the Shahbandar held ranks below the Laksamana (admiral) and the Temenggung (chief of public security). They were part of the Pembesar Berlapan (ڤمبسر برلاڤن), one of the tiers within the Pembesar Empat Lipatan (ڤمبسر امڤت ليڤتن), the hierarchical structure of Malacca’s nobility.

== See also ==
- Shahbandar (Pakistan)
