= Rustomji Bomanji Billimoria =

Indian physician, social worker, and the founder of Bel-Air Hospital

- Born: 13 May 1882; Bombay, Bombay Presidency, British India
- Occupations: Physician; Social worker
- Known for: Panchgani Tuberculosis Sanatorium
- Spouse: Gulestan Rustom Billimoria
- Parent: Bomanji Jamshedji Billimoria
- Awards: Padma Bhushan

Rustomji Bomanji Billimoria was an Indian physician, social worker, and the founder of Bel-Air Hospital, a tuberculosis sanatorium at Panchgani, a hill station in Maharashtra. Born on 13 May 1882 in Mumbai to Bomanji Jamshedji Billimoria as the youngest of his four children, Billimoria took up medicine as his profession and, in 1912, established a sanatorium for treating tuberculosis at Dalkeith in Panchgani. The facility has grown over the years to become a 250-bedded healthcare centre and is managed by Indian Red Cross Society. He was married to Gulestan Rustom Billimoria, a known social worker and a Padma Bhushan recipient. The Government of India awarded him the third highest civilian honour of the Padma Bhushan, in 1961, for his contributions to medicine.
