= Bandar Khayran =

- Town
- Location in Oman
- Coordinates: 23°30′5″N 58°43′57″E
- Country: Oman
- Governorate: Muscat Governorate
- Established: 1854
- Time zone: UTC+4 (+4)

Bandar Khayran (Arabic: بندر الخيران) is a coastal town in northeastern Oman. It is located at around 23°30′5″N 58°43′57″E.
