= Bondar Ziaratgah =

Bondar Ziaratgah بندرزيارتگاه
- Village
- Location within Iran
- Coordinates: 29°27′14″N 57°18′53″E
- Country: Iran
- Province: Kerman
- County: Kerman
- Bakhsh: Rayen
- Rural District: Hoseynabad-e Goruh

Population (2006)
  - Total: 15
- Time zone: UTC+3:30 (IRST)
  - Summer (DST): UTC+4:30 (IRDT)

Bondar Ziaratgah (Persian: بندرزيارتگاه, also Romanized as Bondar Zīāratgāh) is a village in Hoseynabad-e Goruh Rural District, Rayen District, Kerman County, Kerman Province, Iran. At the 2006 census, its population was 15, in 5 families.
