= Bondar (dance) =

Ukrainian folk dance

Bondar (literally "cooper") is a Ukrainian folk dance of khorovod type (circle dance). Its pattern is based on imitation of the professional movements of the cooper.
