= Bondar-e Geshkin =

Bondar-e Geshkin بندرگشكين
- Village
- Country: Iran
- Province: Kerman
- County: Anbarabad
- Bakhsh: Central
- Rural District: Amjaz

Population (2006)
  - Total: 224
- Time zone: UTC+3:30 (IRST)
  - Summer (DST): UTC+4:30 (IRDT)

Bondar-e Geshkin (Persian: بندرگشكين, also Romanized as Bonbdar-e Geshkīn) is a village in Amjaz Rural District, in the Central District of Anbarabad County, Kerman Province, Iran. At the 2006 census, its population was 224, in 42 families.
