= Gulestan Rustom Billimoria =

Indian philanthropist

- Born: Mumbai, Maharashtra, India
- Occupations: Philanthropist, social worker, writer
- Known for: Social service
- Awards: 1972 Padma Bhushan

Gulestan Rustom Billimoria was an Indian philanthropist, social worker, writer and painter, best known for her services for the special needs children of Mumbai.

== Early life and education ==
Born Gulestan J. Bhadurjee, Billimoria did her schooling at Girton High School and college studies at St. Xavier's College, Mumbai during which period she was a fellow of the University of Mumbai for two terms and a member of the university senate.

== Career ==
After her marriage to Rustomji Bomanji Billimoria, the founder of Bel-Air Hospital of Indian Red Cross Society and a Padma Bhushan recipient, she took over the management of the functions of the hospital. Later, she helped found the Savera Special School Gulestan And Billimoria School, Mumbai of the Maharashtra State Women's Council, an institution for the mentally and physically handicapped children.

She served as the Sheriff of Mumbai in 1957 and was the lady superintendent of the Alexandra Girls' English Institution, Mumbai from 1922 to 1937.

Billimoria was a known painter and one of her paintings has been exhibited at the Prince of Wales Museum, Mumbai (present-day Chhatrapati Shivaji Maharaj Vastu Sangrahalaya. He has also written several articles on children with disabilities. In 1972, the Government of India awarded him the Padma Bhushan, the third highest civilian honour. An annual lecture series is organised in his honour, called the Gulistan and Rustam Billimoria Endowment Lecture.

== Awards and honours ==
The Government of India awarded her the Padma Bhushan, the third highest civilian award, in 1972.

== Legacy ==
Gulestan and Rustom Billimoria Endowment Lecture is an annual event organized in her honour.
