= Tom Astor =

German singer and composer

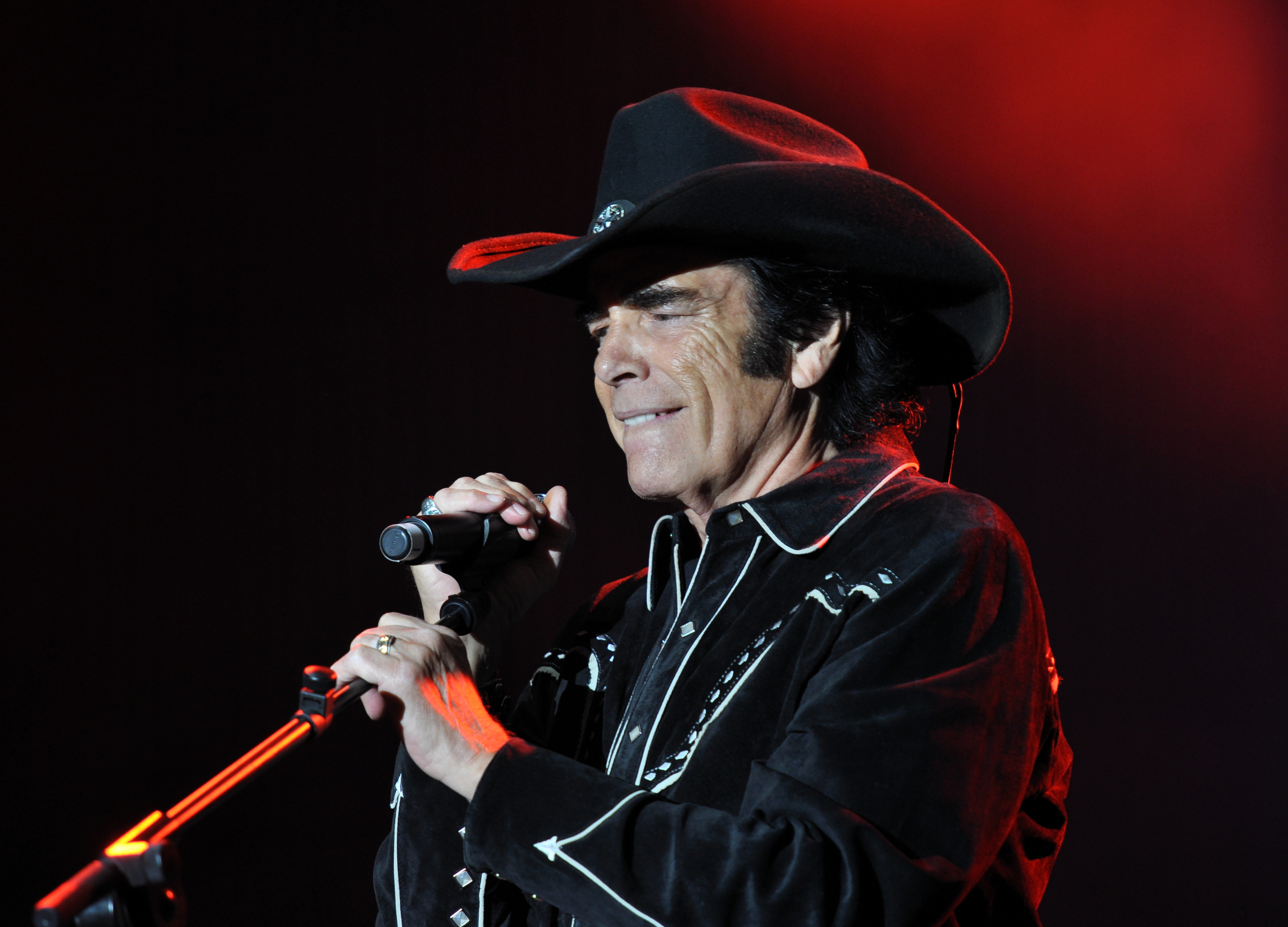

Background information
- Born: Wilhelm Bräutigam; 27 February 1943 (age 83); Schmallenberg, Germany
- Genres: Country music, Schlager music
- Occupations: Singer, songwriter
- Instruments: Vocals, Guitar
- Labels: Ariola, BMG, EMI
- Website: http://www.tom-astor.de

Tom Astor (born 27 February 1943) is a German singer and composer. He is noted for his extensive country and western recordings. He has worked with Johnny Cash, Kris Kristofferson, Dolly Parton, Kenny Rogers, John Denver, The Bellamy Brothers, Willie Nelson, Billy Ray Cyrus, George Jones, Wanda Jackson and Charlie McCoy among others.

== Discography ==
Astor has recorded some 40 albums and around 600 songs. He has sold more than 4 million sound recordings.

=== Albums ===
- Grand Prix 1976
- Asphalt Cowboy 1980
- Hallo Trucker 1981
- Country & Western Super Hits (Folge 1) 1983
- Country & Western Super Hits (Folge 2) 1983
- Westwind 1984
- Hallo, guten Morgen Deutschland 1986
- Trucker Weihnacht 1986
- Lass rollen Trucker 1987
- Hallo Freunde 1987
- Eine kleine Dosis Freiheit 1988
- International Airport
- Fröhliche Trucker Weihnacht 1988
- Meine schönsten Country & Trucker Songs 1989
- Junger Adler 1990
- Voll aus dem Leben 1991
- Auf Achse 1991
- Hallo Trucker 1991
- Kapitäne der Landstraße 1992
- Fröhliche Trucker Weihnacht 1992
- Sturm und Drang 1993
- Flieg junger Adler 1993
- Ich bin wie ich bin 1994
- Kameraden der Straße 1994
- Meilensteine 1995
- Tom Astor 1996
- Das Beste ... Live 1997
- ...und ich bin dein Freund 1998
- Hautnah 2000
- Mein Eldorado 2003
- Tom Astor Live 2004
- Ich will mehr 2005
- Lass es schnei’n 2005
- Duette 2007 (with Johnny Cash, Kenny Rogers, Waylon Jennings, Billy Swan and Willie Nelson)
- Alles klar – kein Problem! 2008
- Tom Astor & Band unplugged live 2009
- Leben pur 2010
- Kinder Country Party 2012
- Volle Kraft voraus 2014
- Lieder zum Anfassen 2015
- Ein Abend mit Tom Astor 2016

=== Singles ===
- Hallo, guten Morgen Deutschland 1984 und 1990
- Freunde 1988
- Junger Adler 1990
- Ich bin kein Dichter- kein Poet 1991
- Take it easy nimm’s leicht 1991
- Flieg junger Adler 1993
- Kleiner Rebell 1994
- Hungrige Herzen 1994
- Irgendwie wird's schon geh´n 1996
- Eisen im Feuer 1997
- Ich bin dein Freund
- Mein Eldorado 2003
- Steh immer wieder auf 2005
- Wir werden nicht älter 2008
- Mit voller Kraft voraus 2014

== Awards and honors ==
- Goldene Stimmgabel 1994
- ZDF-Hitparade - Hit of the Year with Junger Adler, 1994
- Nomination „Global Artist Award“ 2007 - Country Music Association
- 3 Gold records
