= Bandar Abdulrahman Al-Mohanna =

Saudi businessman

Bandar Abdulrahman Almohanna
- Education: King Saud University; American University; University of Michigan
- Occupations: CEO & Managing Director of (Flynas)

Bandar Abdulrahman Al-Mohanna (Arabic: بندر عبدالرحمن المهنا) is a Saudi Arabian businessman and the Chief Executive Officer and Managing Director of Flynas, the leading low-cost airline based in the Kingdom of Saudi Arabia.

== Early life and education ==
Mr. Almohanna completed his Bachelor of Science degree in Accounting from King Saud University, Riyadh in 1993. He then obtained an MBA degree from American University in 1998 and a Master’s of Actuarial Mathematics & Finance from the University of Michigan Ann Arbor in 2002. He also completed the Advanced Management Program at Harvard Business School.

== Career ==
In 2003, Mr. Almohanna was appointed as Chief Financial Analyst at Makshaff Investments and Services where he was tasked with overseeing transportation, media, insurance and real estate divisions of the Group. Furthermore, throughout 11 years of his career, Mr. Almohanna held several positions at the Saudi Arabian Monetary Agency (SAMA), the central bank of Saudi Arabia, including the Banking Supervision Department.

Mr. Almohanna’s career with National Air Services (flynas) started in 2006 with his appointment as Chief Financial Officer. He was promoted to Vice President of flynas in 2007, and later to Chief Executive Officer in February 2015.

Serving through various positions at flynas / NAS Holding, Mr. Almohanna played a key role in the development of the various subsidiaries and brands listed under it, especially flynas, the first leading low-cost airline in Saudi Arabia, and flynas Hajj & Umrah.

Additionally, Mr. Almohanna is the Chairman of MEFIC Capital and a member of the Board of Directors for multiple companies including Flynas, NAS ExecuJet and Saudi Air Navigation Services (SANS).
