= Bondar-e Gavsin =

Bondar-e Gavsin بندرگاوسين
- Village
- Location within Iran
- Coordinates: 28°33′06″N 58°06′07″E
- Country: Iran
- Province: Kerman
- County: Anbarabad
- Bakhsh: Jebalbarez-e Jonubi
- Rural District: Garmsar

Population (2006)
  - Total: 79
- Time zone: UTC+3:30 (IRST)
  - Summer (DST): UTC+4:30 (IRDT)

Bondar-e Gavsin (Persian: بندرگاوسين, also Romanized as Bondar-e Gāvsīn; also known as Bondargāvsīn) is a village in Garmsar Rural District, Jebalbarez-e Jonubi District, Anbarabad County, Kerman Province, Iran. At the 2006 census, its population was 79, in 15 families.
