= Bandar, Yazd =

Bandar بندر
- Village
- Location within Iran
- Coordinates: 32°24′49″N 54°39′10″E
- Country: Iran
- Province: Yazd
- County: Ardakan
- Bakhsh: Kharanaq
- Rural District: Rabatat

Population (2006)
  - Total: 22
- Time zone: UTC+3:30 (IRST)
  - Summer (DST): UTC+4:30 (IRDT)

Bandar (Persian: بندر) is a village in Rabatat Rural District, Kharanaq District, Ardakan County, Yazd Province, Iran. At the 2006 census, its population was 22, in 8 families.
