= Bandar, Kermanshah =

Bandar بندار
- Village
- Location within Iran
- Coordinates: 34°29′02″N 46°32′44″E
- Country: Iran
- Province: Kermanshah
- County: Kermanshah
- Bakhsh: Kuzaran
- Rural District: Sanjabi

Population (2006)
  - Total: 240
- Time zone: UTC+3:30 (IRST)
  - Summer (DST): UTC+4:30 (IRDT)

Bandar (Persian: بندار, also Romanized as Bandār and Bendār; also known as Bandār-e Sheykh and Bindār) is a village in Sanjabi Rural District, Kuzaran District, Kermanshah County, Kermanshah Province, Iran. At the 2006 census, its population was 240, in 54 families.
