= List of airlines of Kuwait =

This is a list of airlines currently operating in Kuwait.

== Scheduled airlines ==
Airline	Arabic name	Image	IATA	ICAO	Callsign	Hubs	Commenced operations	Notes
Jazeera Airways	طيران الجزيرة		J9	JZR	JAZEERA	Kuwait International Airport	2004	The airline is Kuwait's second national airline after Kuwait Airways.; The airline is the Middle East's first fully privately owned airline.
Kuwait Airways	الخطوط الجوية الكويتية		KU	KAC	KUWAITI	Kuwait International Airport	1954	The airline is Kuwait's national airline.

== See also ==
- List of defunct airlines of Kuwait
- List of defunct airlines of Asia
- List of airports in Kuwait
- List of airlines
