= Trans Arabia Airways =

Kuwaiti airline headquartered in Kuwait City

- Commenced operations: September 1959; 66 years ago
- Ceased operations: April 1964; 62 years ago (absorbed by Kuwait Airways)
- Fleet size: 3
- Destinations: 10
- Headquarters: Kuwait City

Trans Arabia Airways was a Kuwaiti airline. It had its headquarters in the Karnak Building in Kuwait City.

== History ==
The carrier started operations in September 1959 serving the Beirut–Kuwait route with a Douglas DC-4 that previously belonged to Australian National Airways. Shortly after those flights began, a second DC-4 was chartered from Starways to boost capacity in the route. In March 1960, the airline placed a provisional order for two Argosy aircraft; however, this order never materialised, and the airline ordered three Douglas DC-6Bs instead.

By April 1964, the Trans Arabia Airways fleet included three Douglas DC-6Bs to serve a route network that comprised seven destinations in the Middle East, including Bahrain, Beirut, Cairo, Damascus, Doha, Jeddah, Jerusalem, and three in Europe, including Frankfurt, London and Rome; that month, the airline was absorbed by Kuwait Airways.

== See also ==
- List of airlines of Kuwait
- Transport in Kuwait
