= Fawaz Alfarah =

Kuwaiti civil aviation official

Fawaz Abdulaziz Alfarah
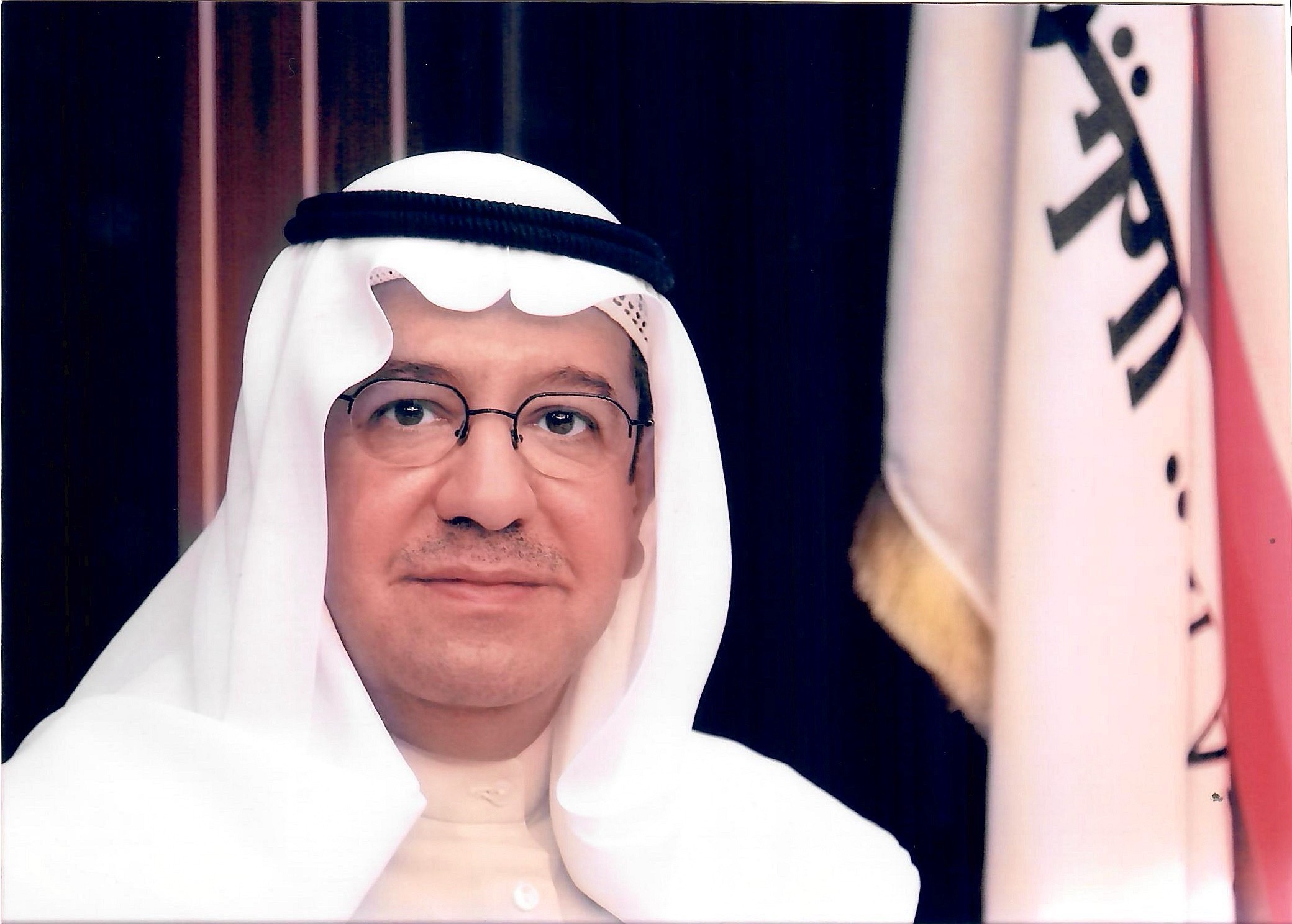

President of Civil Aviation in the State of Kuwait
- In office 2006–2016

Personal details
- Born: March 5, 1958
- Died: June 5, 2024 (aged 66)

Fawaz Abdulaziz Alfarah is a Kuwaiti civil aviation official who served as the President of Kuwait's Directorate General of Civil Aviation (DGCA) from December 2006 until August 2016.

== Early life and education ==
Alfarah received a bachelor's degree in Business Administration from Kuwait University in 1981, and an MBA from American University in Washington, D.C., in 1984.

== Career ==
Alfarah joined Kuwait's Directorate General of Civil Aviation in 1981 as an Administrative Researcher in the Air Transport Department. He subsequently served as Superintendent of International Relations (1987), Director of Air Transport (1989), and Director of Aviation Safety (1996). In 1997, he became Deputy Director General for Aviation Safety and Air Transport Affairs, simultaneously serving as Secretary General of Kuwait's Supreme Council of Civil Aviation.

In December 2006, Alfarah was appointed President of the DGCA. He was reappointed to this position in December 2014. He resigned in August 2016, completing approximately 35 years of service in Kuwait's civil aviation sector.

From 2002 to 2006, Alfarah was a member of the Kuwait Airways Corporation board, and from 2007 to October 2012, he served as Vice Chairman during the company's transition toward privatization.

=== Contributions and Achievements ===
During his tenure, Alfarah supported the implementation of Kuwait's "Open Skies" aviation policy, designed to liberalize air traffic among Gulf Cooperation Council (GCC) member states. He oversaw the establishment of bilateral air transport agreements, including an Open Skies agreement with Thailand.

In 2011, a new radar system was installed at Kuwait International Airport under his oversight. Additionally, he approved the construction of a new airport terminal costing approximately $3 billion to expand capacity and reduce congestion. He announced in 2013 plans for the government to select from 18 international companies bidding to undertake the construction.

Alfarah introduced an electronic communication portal at Kuwait International Airport in 2014, and implemented new fees for commercial aircraft using Kuwaiti airspace.

In 2015, he inaugurated the Sheikh Saad Al-Abdallah General Aviation Terminal (Terminal 3) and facilitated the increase of DGCA's staff nationalization rate to 98 percent.

He also proposed reforms aimed at restructuring the DGCA into an independent authority, and initiated cooperation with the Singapore Civil Aviation College to create an ICAO-accredited training facility in Kuwait.

=== Infrastructure and Development ===
Alfarah announced plans in 2012 to expand Kuwait International Airport's passenger capacity from approximately 7 million to 13 million annually by 2016, with additional targets of 25 million by 2025 and potentially 50 million by 2035.

His administration managed expansions such as the addition of four departure gates, increasing terminal capacity by approximately 40 percent, and renewed a five-year concession agreement with the World Duty Free Group. He also initiated major construction projects, including Terminal 2, additional runways, a control tower, and upgraded navigation systems.

During his presidency, Kuwait International Airport recorded annual revenues of approximately 18 million Kuwaiti dinars and passenger growth averaging 5% per year.

=== International Representation ===
Alfarah represented Kuwait in international aviation meetings and events. He led Kuwait's delegations to ICAO Air Services Negotiation Conferences and participated in the EU–GCC Aviation Dialogue held in Brussels in 2014. He also engaged in diplomatic dialogues, including a 2014 discussion with Prince Andrew, Duke of York, regarding Kuwait's airport expansion plans. Alfarah represented Kuwait at international aviation conferences, including ICAO and EU–GCC Aviation Dialogues
