= List of airports in Kuwait =

This is a list of airports in Kuwait, sorted by location.

== Airports ==
Airport names shown in bold indicate the airport has scheduled service on commercial airlines.

City served	ICAO	IATA	Airport name	Coordinates
**Civil airports**				
Kuwait City	OKBK	KWI	**Kuwait International Airport**	29°13′36″N 047°58′48″E
**Military airports**				
Kuwait	OKAJ	XIJ	Ahmad al-Jaber Air Base	28°56′05″N 047°47′31″E
Kuwait	OKAS		Ali Al Salem Air Base	29°20′48″N 047°31′14″E
Kuwait	OKDI		Udairi Army Airfield (Camp Buehring)	29°41′51″N 047°26′09″E

== See also ==
- Transport in Kuwait
- List of the busiest airports in the Middle East
- List of airports by ICAO code: O#OK - Kuwait
- Wikipedia:WikiProject Aviation/Airline destination lists: Asia#Kuwait
