= Kuwait Metropolitan Rapid Transit System Project =

Defunct subway plan in Kuwait

Overview
- Locale: Kuwait City, Kuwait
- Transit type: Rapid transit
- Number of lines: 4

Operation
- Character: Underground and elevated

Technical
- System length: 160 km (99.4 mi)

The Kuwait Metropolitan Rapid Transit System Project was a plan to build a rapid transit network in Kuwait. The project, which had been in the planning stages since the 2000s, was officially cancelled in 2023 due to a lack of funds.

== History ==
The project was supposed to have been implemented through a public-private partnership (PPP) under the management of the Kuwait Authority for Partnership Projects (KAPP), where the government would have owned 10% of the project and raised 50% of the funds through an initial public offer. The remaining 40% would have been held by the private developer.

In 2023, the Supreme Committee of the KAPP decided to cancel the Kuwait Metro project. This decision, ratified by the Authority's Board of Directors and endorsed by Amiri Diwan, was prompted by the project's substantial administrative and financial burdens on public funds, amounting to د.ك 2,152,000, as highlighted by the Audit Bureau.

== Routes ==
Four lines were planned to be built in five phases, with a total of 160 kilometres (99 mi) with 68 stations.

- Line 1: 23.7 km, 19 stations, with a 57.3 km extension
- Line 2: 21 km, 27 stations, with a 16.4 km extension
- Line 3: 24 km, 15 stations
- Line 4: 22.7 km, 17 stations

== See also ==
- Transport in Kuwait
- Gulf Railway
