= Transport in Kuwait =

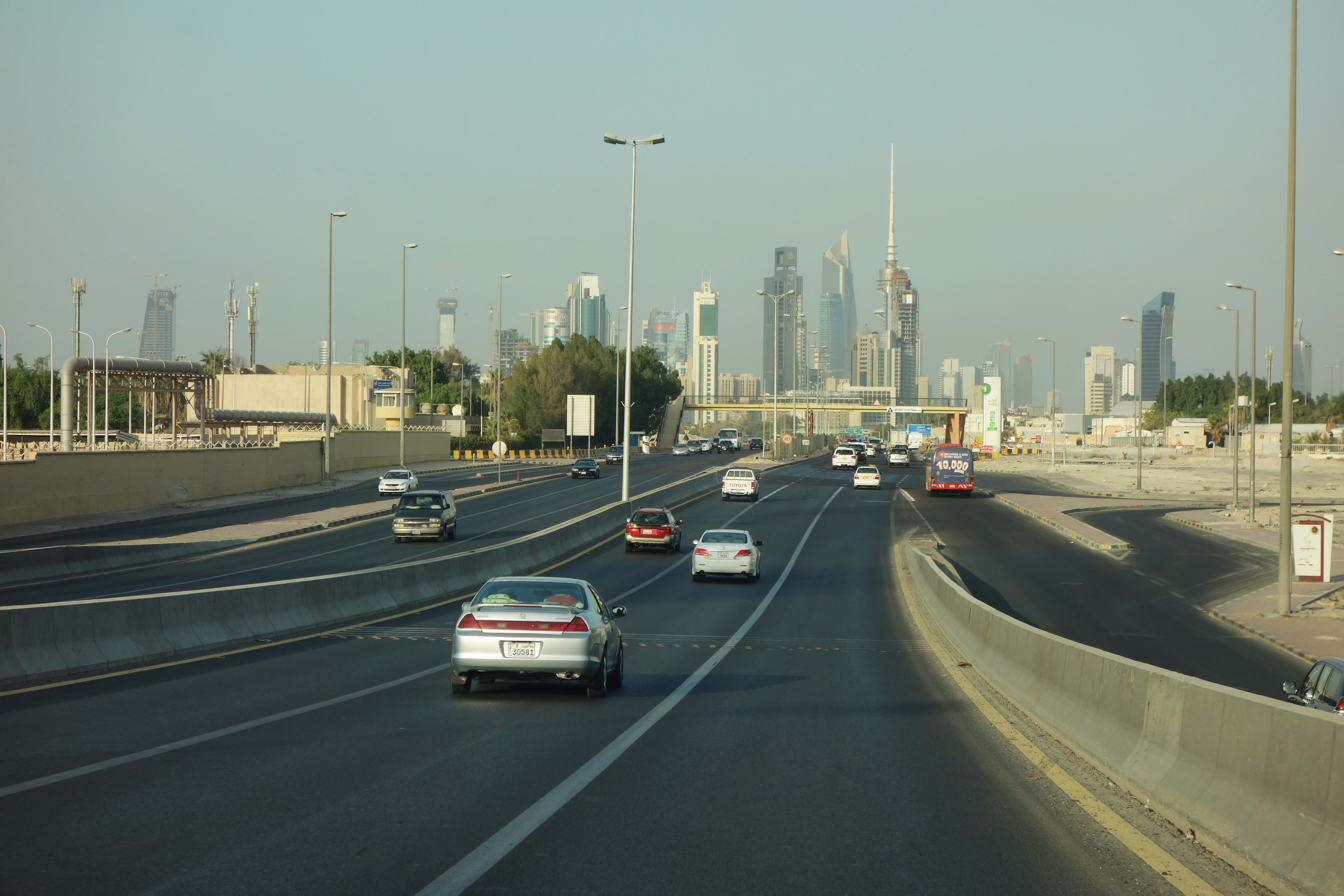
Kuwait City Downtown

As a small country, local transport in Kuwait is largely road-based with one car for every 2.25 people. Bus services make up Kuwait's entire public transport network. There are seven airports in Kuwait, the largest of which and solely allocated for civil use is Kuwait International Airport. The Gulf Railway is currently under planning in Kuwait. Kuwait has several maritime ports along the coast of the Persian Gulf, the largest port is Mubarak Al Kabeer Port which is currently under construction.

During the First Gulf War, a lot of Kuwait's infrastructure was damaged or destroyed.

== Road transport ==
As a nation with one car per 2.25 people, Kuwait relies heavily on its road network for transportation. The total length of paved and unpaved roads was 6,524 km in 2009. Traffic congestion is common throughout the day, particularly in Kuwait City.

The country's public transport network consists entirely of bus routes. The state-owned Kuwait Public Transportation Company was established in 1962. It runs local bus routes across Kuwait. The main private bus company is CityBus, which operates about 28 routes across the country. Another private bus company, Kuwait Gulf Link Public Transport Services, was started in 2006. It runs local bus routes across Kuwait and longer distance services to neighbouring Arab countries.

== Ports and harbors ==
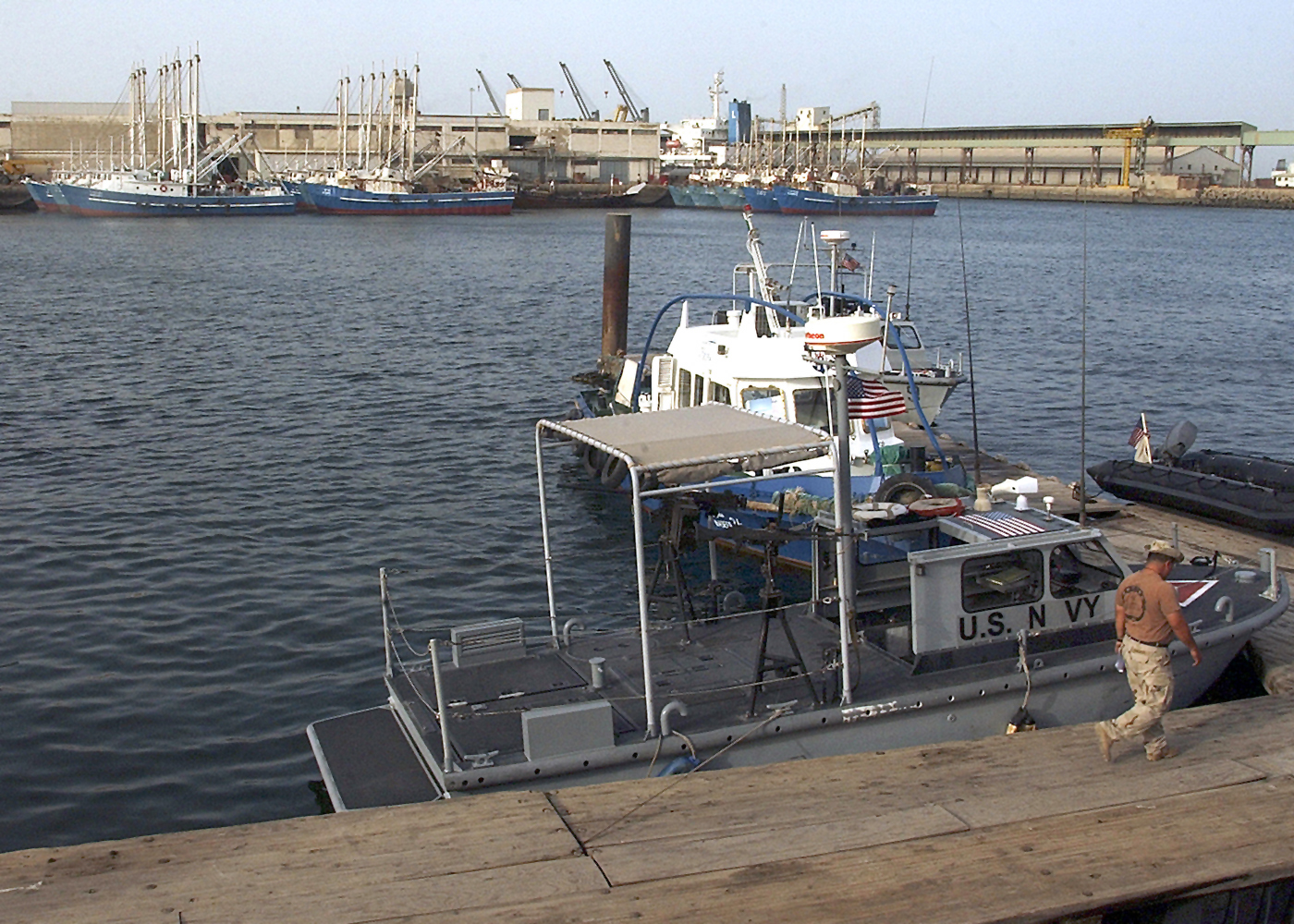
The Ash Shu'aybah port

Kuwait lies on the Persian Gulf and ports include: Ash Shu'aybah, Ash Shuwaykh, Kuwait, Mina' 'Abd Allah, Mina' al Ahmadi, Mina' Su'ud, and Mubarak Al Kabeer Port.

=== Mubarak Al Kabeer Port ===
Under China's Belt and Road Initiative, the Mubarak Al Kabeer Port is part of the first phase of the Silk City project. As of 2021, the Mubarak Al Kabeer Port is currently under construction. In September 2020, it was reported that the port was 53% complete. In March 2021, it was announced that Kuwait and Pakistan will develop linkages between Pakistan's Gwadar Port and Mubarak Al Kabeer Port. In April 2021, the port's first phase was completed (4 berths). As part of Mubarak Al Kabeer Port's development, Bubiyan Island will contain power plants and substations. A 5,000-megawatt power plant has already been built in Subiya, the Subiya power plant is the largest power plant in Kuwait. Mubarak Al Kabeer Port is among Kuwait's largest infrastructure projects in 2021. There is a current road project connecting Mubarak Al Kabeer Port's first phase to the existing road network in Bubiyan Island. Mubarak Al Kabeer Port's fire stations are currently under development. The port is set to be environmentally sustainable.

=== Merchant marine ===
total: 38 ships (1000 GT or over) 2,294,233 GT/3,730,776 DWT
ships by type: bulk carrier 2, cargo 1, container 6, liquefied gas 5, livestock carrier 4, petroleum tanker 20
foreign-owned: 1 (Iran 1)
registered in other countries: 29 (Bahrain 3, Comoros 1, Liberia 1, Libya 1, Panama 2, Qatar 7, Saudi Arabia 6, UAE 8) (2005)

== Airports ==
=== Overview ===
There are seven airports, the largest of which and solely allocated for civil use is Kuwait International Airport. Kuwait International Airport recently inaugurated two new terminals to cater to Kuwait-based airlines. Moreover, the largest Kuwait International Airport terminal (Terminal 2) is currently under construction and will expand the airport's overall capacity by 25–50 million passengers per year. The new terminal is environmentally sustainable. It is one of the world's largest environment friendly airport projects.

=== Airports - with paved runways ===
- Total: 4
- over 3,047 m: 1
- 2,438 to 3,047 m: 2
- 1,524 to 2,437 m: 1

=== Airports - with unpaved runways ===
- Total: 3
- 1,524 to 2,437 m: 1
- under 914 m: 2 (2005)

=== Heliports ===
- 12 (2023)

=== Kuwait-based Airlines ===
This is a list of airlines currently operating in Kuwait.

Airline	Arabic name	Image	IATA	ICAO	Callsign	Hubs	Notes
Jazeera Airways	طيران الجزيرة		J9	JZR	JAZEERA	Kuwait International Airport	The airline commenced operations in 2004.; The airline is Kuwait's second national airline after Kuwait Airways.; The airline is the Middle East's first fully privately owned airline.
Kuwait Airways	الخطوط الجوية الكويتية		KU	KAC	KUWAITI	Kuwait International Airport	The airline commenced operations on 16 March 1954.; The airline is Kuwait's national airline.

== Railways ==
=== Gulf Railway ===
Kuwait City will form one terminus of the Gulf Railway, a 2,000 km (1,200 mi) railway network which will run from Kuwait to Oman, via cities across the Persian Gulf. As of 2021, the Gulf Railway project is currently under construction in Kuwait.

Mubarak Al Kabeer Port in Bubiyan Island is part of the Gulf Railway.

=== Metro ===
The Kuwait Metropolitan Rapid Transit System Project was a planned four-line metro network covering 160 km with 69 stations. The project was meant to solve the increasing congestion to the country's roads. The project was eventually cancelled in 2023, citing financial burden.

== See also ==
- Kuwait
- Jazeera Airways
- Wataniya Airways
