= Israel–Kuwait relations =

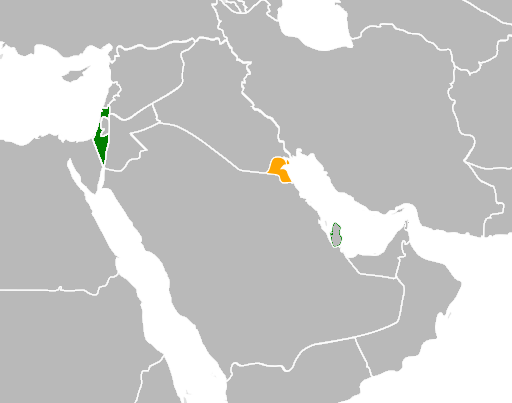

- Israel: Kuwait

Israel and Kuwait do not maintain diplomatic relations. Israel does not have formal entry or trade restrictions with Kuwait. During the wars between Israel and the Arab countries, Kuwaiti forces participated against Israel. Kuwait's long line of Emirs (kings) have since then continued to fiercely deny establishing any diplomatic relations with Israel.

== History ==
Kuwait boycotts and bans Israeli products and its media and government refers to Israel as the "Zionist entity".

Following the Iraqi invasion of Kuwait and the start of the Gulf War, during which Iraq launched missiles against Israel, America insisted on Israel not to join the war in fears that it would lead to Arab states abandoning the coalition created in order to fight Iraq.

In January 2014, Kuwait boycotted a renewable energy conference in Abu Dhabi as it was attended by Israel.

In October 2017, Kuwaiti Speaker of the National Assembly Al-Ghanim, at a Inter-Parliamentary Union meeting in Russia, labeled the Israeli delegation as "state terrorism" and urged them to pack their bags and get out. The Israeli delegates left amid applause from other attendees. He was welcomed back in Kuwait with praises by the Emir as well as people of Kuwait.

On the heels of the Abraham Accords, in response to Trump announcing that Kuwait could be the next Arab country to recognize Israel, Kuwait denied the claims and said, "Kuwait will be the last country to recognise Israel". The Late Emir of Kuwait, Sheikh Sabah Al-Ahmad Al-Jaber Al-Sabah refused, on the last days of his life, to attend the normalizing Bahrain Economic Conference, which was held in Manama in 2020. Marzouq Al-Ghanim reported in an interview that the Emir of Kuwait called him in anger at that time and told him: "Look my son, I am old now and I don't want to meet my Lord having shaken hands with Zionists." The Emir then asked Al-Ghanim to work on Kuwait's non-participation in the conference.

== Travel ==
Kuwait does not allow entry in its territory to anyone with an Israeli passport; anyone can be barred from entry for having Israeli visa stamps on their passport or if they are dual citizens between any country and Israel. Citizens of Kuwait can enter Israel as long as they apply for a visa, but if their passport was stamped with an Israeli visa or entry to Israel stamp, they cannot be allowed back into Kuwait.

Per Kuwaiti law, no agreement, commercial or otherwise, can be entered into between Kuwaitis and individuals either residing in Israel or holding Israeli citizenship. The Department of Transportation of the United States of America claimed in 2015 that the refusal of Kuwait Airways to sell tickets to Israeli passport holders on certain routes apparently amounted to "discrimination", ordering the airline to stop denying transport to Israeli citizens. In response, the airline cited Kuwaiti law while upholding its decision, discontinued its JFK–London service in 2015, and later won a 2017 German court case upholding its right to deny Israeli passport holders transit through Kuwait. The German court was subsequently accused of endorsing antisemitism.

== See also ==
- History of the Jews in Kuwait
- Ministry of Foreign Affairs (Kuwait)
