= Marwan Boodai =

Kuwaiti businessman

Marwan Marzouk Boodai
- مروان بودي
- Born: مروان مرزوق بودي; 1960
- Citizenship: Kuwait
- Occupation: Executive businessman
- Known for: Co-founder of Jazeera Airways

Marwan Marzouk Boodai (born 1960) is a Kuwaiti executive and businessman. He is the CEO and Chairman of Kuwait-based low-cost airline Al-Jazeera Airways, and the vice chairman of the Boodai Corp.

== Career ==
Marwan Boodai is the co-founder, Chairman, and CEO of Al-Jazeera Airways, the first private airline in Kuwait, established in 2005, the company ended Kuwait’s reliance on a single national carrier for 50 years. He is also the Vice President Boodai Corp, a family-owned company that invests in various businesses across the Gulf countries and the parent company of Al-Jazeera, along with other businesses such as Ramedia Group, the owner of several newspapers and broadcasting channels such as Al-Rai TV. It also owns City Group Company, a transportation company in Kuwait, along with other ventures in engineering, services, and cement production.

Al-Jazeera Airways began its budget flights in October 2005, quickly transporting 100,000 passengers in just four months. The company started with a capital of $34 million. On the occasion of its first anniversary, Jazeera Airways announced that it had carried half a million passengers on its planes. Al-Jazeera currently has 24 planes and operates flights to around 20 cities across the Middle East and India.

== Family ==
His brother, Jassim Boodai, is a journalist and owner of Al Rai Media Group.
