= List of the busiest airports in the Middle East =

Middle East Airports Statistics

This is a list of the busiest airports in the Middle East (handling more than 5,000,000 passengers per year), ranked by total passengers per year, including both terminal and transit passengers.

The tables also show the percentage change in total passengers for each airport over the last year. Data is sourced individually for each airport and normally originates from national aviation authority statistics, or those of the airport operator or international civil aviation authorities. Data for Iranian airports is accumulated based on Solar Hijri calendar as presented by Civil Aviation Authority of Islamic Republic of Iran and Iran Airports and Air Navigation Company (IAC).

== 2025 statistics ==
2025 data is being updated as not all airports and state regulatory entities have disclosed the statistic yet.

| Rank | Airport | City served | Country | Code (IATA/ICAO) | Total passengers | Rank change | % change |
|---|---|---|---|---|---|---|---|
| 1. | Dubai International Airport | Dubai | United Arab Emirates | DXB/OMDB | 95,200,000 | Steady | ▲3.1% |
| 2. | Istanbul Airport (Note: Located on the European side of Turkey) | Istanbul | Turkey | IST/LTFM | 84,457,421 | Steady | ▲5.0% |
| 3. | Hamad International Airport | Doha | Qatar | DOH/OTHH | 54,300,000 | Steady | ▲3.0% |
| 4. | King Abdulaziz International Airport | Jeddah | Saudi Arabia | JED/OEJN | 53,400,000 | Steady | ▲8.8% |
| 5. | Istanbul Sabiha Gökçen International Airport | Istanbul | Turkey | SAW/LTFJ | 48,420,757 | Steady | ▲16.8% |
| 6. | King Khalid International Airport | Riyadh | Saudi Arabia | RUH/OERK | 40,700,000 | ▲1 | ▲8.3% |
| 7. | Antalya Airport | Antalya | Turkey | AYT/LTAI | 39,160,491 | ▼1 | ▲2.7% |
| 8. | Zayed International Airport | Abu Dhabi | United Arab Emirates | AUH/OMAA | 32,300,000 | Steady | ▲7.1% |
| 9. | Cairo International Airport | Cairo | Egypt | CAI/HECA | 30,944,269 | Steady | ▲6.8% |
| 10. | Sharjah International Airport | Sharjah | United Arab Emirates | SHJ/OMSJ | 19,480,000 | Steady | ▲13.9% |
| 11 | Ben Gurion International Airport | Tel Aviv | Israel | TLV/LLBG | 19,160,160 | ▲1 | ▲31.8% |
| 12. | Kuwait International Airport | Kuwait City | Kuwait | KWI/OKKK | 15,412,956 | ▼1 | ▲0.2% |
| 13. | Ankara Esenboğa Airport | Ankara | Turkey | ESB/LTAC | 13,987,298 | ▲1 | ▲8.3% |
| 14. | King Fahd International Airport | Dammam | Saudi Arabia | DMM/OEDF | 13,700,000 | Steady | ▲7.0% |
| 15. | Muscat International Airport | Muscat | Oman | MCT/OOMS | 13,200,000 | ▲1 | ▲2.3% |
| 16. | İzmir Adnan Menderes Airport | İzmir | Turkey | ADB/LTBJ | 12,660,080 | ▲1 | ▲10.0% |
| 17. | Prince Mohammad bin Abdulaziz International Airport | Medina | Saudi Arabia | MED/OEMA | 11,891,855 | ▲1 | ▲9.0% |
| 18. | Hurghada International Airport | Hurghada | Egypt | HRG/HEGN | 11,425,529 | ▲1 | ▲18.5% |
| 19. | Mehrabad International Airport^{*} | Tehran | Iran | THR/OIII | 10,500,000 | ▼6 | ▼23.6% |
| 20. | Larnaca International Airport | Larnaca | Cyprus | LCA/LCLK | 9,914,092 | ▲2 | ▲14.8% |
| 21. | Queen Alia International Airport | Amman | Jordan | AMM/OJAI | 9,780,000 | Steady | ▲11.2% |
| 22. | Bahrain International Airport | Muharraq | Bahrain | BAH/OBBI | 9,740,000 | ▼2 | ▲4.2% |
| 23. | Sharm El Sheikh International Airport | Sharm El Sheikh | Egypt | SSH/HESH | 9,046,690 | ▲2 | ▲32.3% |
| 24. | Mashhad Shahid Hasheminejad International Airport^{*} | Mashhad | Iran | MHD/OIMM | 7,360,000 | ▼1 | ▼12.7% |
| 25. | Imam Khomeini International Airport^{*} | Tehran | Iran | IKA/OIIE | TBU | ▼1 | ▼TBU |
| 26. | Beirut–Rafic Hariri International Airport | Beirut | Lebanon | BEY/OLBA | 7,000,000 | ▲1 | ▲24.6% |
| 27. | Dalaman Airport | Dalaman | Turkey | DLM/LTBS | 5,638,025 | ▼1 | ▲0.1% |
| 28. | Çukurova International Airport | Adana / Mersin | Turkey | COV/LTDB | 5,401,952 | New entry | ▲180.1% |

^*Data for Iranian airports is of year 1404 of Solar Hijri calendar.

== 2024 statistics ==
| Rank | Airport | City served | Country | Code (IATA/ICAO) | Total passengers | Rank change | % change |
|---|---|---|---|---|---|---|---|
| 1. | Dubai International Airport | Dubai | United Arab Emirates | DXB/OMDB | 92,300,000 | Steady | ▲6.2% |
| 2. | Istanbul Airport | Istanbul | Turkey | IST/LTFM | 80,430,740 | Steady | ▲3.9% |
| 3. | Hamad International Airport | Doha | Qatar | DOH/OTHH | 52,700,000 | Steady | ▲14.8% |
| 4. | King Abdulaziz International Airport | Jeddah | Saudi Arabia | JED/OEJN | 49,100,000 | Steady | ▲15.0% |
| 5. | Istanbul Sabiha Gökçen International Airport | Istanbul | Turkey | SAW/LTFJ | 41,449,044 | Steady | ▲12.0% |
| 6. | Antalya Airport | Antalya | Turkey | AYT/LTAI | 38,133,273 | Steady | ▲7.3% |
| 7. | King Khalid International Airport | Riyadh | Saudi Arabia | RUH/OERK | 37,000,000 | Steady | ▲17.8% |
| 8. | Zayed International Airport | Abu Dhabi | United Arab Emirates | AUH/OMAA | 29,400,000 | ▲1 | ▲28.1% |
| 9. | Cairo International Airport | Cairo | Egypt | CAI/HECA | 28,970,000 | ▼1 | ▲11.4% |
| 10. | Sharjah International Airport | Sharjah | United Arab Emirates | SHJ/OMSJ | 17,101,725 | ▲2 | ▲11.4% |
| 11. | Kuwait International Airport | Kuwait City | Kuwait | KWI/OKKK | 15,384,590 | Steady | ▼1.5% |
| 12 | David Ben Gurion International Airport | Tel Aviv | Israel | TLV/LLBG | 13,879,490 | ▼2 | ▼34.2% |
| 13. | Mehrabad International Airport^{*} | Tehran | Iran | THR/OIII | 13,750,000 | ▲1 | ▲11.3% |
| 14. | Ankara Esenboğa Airport | Ankara | Turkey | ESB/LTAC | 12,913,753 | ▲1 | ▲7.5% |
| 15. | Muscat International Airport | Muscat | Oman | MCT/OOMS | 12,899,829 | ▼2 | ▲2.4% |
| 16. | King Fahd International Airport | Dammam | Saudi Arabia | DMM/OEDF | 12,800,000 | Steady | ▲17.4% |
| 17. | İzmir Adnan Menderes Airport | İzmir | Turkey | ADB/LTBJ | 11,507,296 | Steady | ▲9.1% |
| 18. | Prince Mohammad bin Abdulaziz International Airport | Medina | Saudi Arabia | MED/OEMA | 10,912,802 | ▲1 | ▲15.8% |
| 19. | Hurghada International Airport | Hurghada | Egypt | HRG/HEGN | 9,636,689 | ▲2 | ▲9.6% |
| 20. | Bahrain International Airport | Muharraq | Bahrain | BAH/OBBI | 9,350,000 | Steady | ▲8.0% |
| 21. | Queen Alia International Airport | Amman | Jordan | AMM/OJAI | 8,798,595 | ▼2 | ▼7.4% |
| 22. | Larnaca International Airport | Larnaca | Cyprus | LCA/LCLK | 8,661,354 | Steady | ▲6.9% |
| 23. | Mashhad Shahid Hasheminejad International Airport^{*} | Mashhad | Iran | MHD/OIMM | 8,420,000 | ▲2 | ▲19.0% |
| 24. | Imam Khomeini International Airport^{*} | Tehran | Iran | IKA/OIIE | 7,429,391 | ▼1 | ▲19.6% |
| 25. | Sharm El Sheikh International Airport | Sharm El Sheikh | Egypt | SSH/HESH | 6,837,007 | ▲1 | ▲14.2% |
| 26. | Dalaman Airport | Dalaman | Turkey | DLM/LTBS | 5,637,067 | ▲1 | ▲7.9% |
| 27. | Beirut–Rafic Hariri International Airport | Beirut | Lebanon | BEY/OLBA | 5,620,000 | ▼4 | ▼20.8% |

^*Data for Iranian airports is of year 1403 of Solar Hijri calendar.

== 2023 statistics ==
| Rank | Airport | City served | Country | Code (IATA/ICAO) | Total passengers | Rank change | % change |
|---|---|---|---|---|---|---|---|
| 1. | Dubai International Airport | Dubai | United Arab Emirates | DXB/OMDB | 86,900,000 | Steady | ▲31.7% |
| 2. | Istanbul Airport | Istanbul | Turkey | IST/LTFM | 76,011,907 | Steady | ▲18.2% |
| 3. | Hamad International Airport | Doha | Qatar | DOH/OTHH | 45,916,104 | Steady | ▲25.8% |
| 4. | King Abdulaziz International Airport | Jeddah | Saudi Arabia | JED/OEJN | 42,700,000 | Steady | ▲34.9% |
| 5. | Istanbul Sabiha Gökçen International Airport | Istanbul | Turkey | SAW/LTFJ | 36,825,424 | ▲1 | ▲20.5% |
| 6. | Antalya Airport | Antalya | Turkey | AYT/LTAI | 35,664,138 | ▼1 | ▲14.2% |
| 7. | King Khalid International Airport | Riyadh | Saudi Arabia | RUH/OERK | 31,409,000 | Steady | ▲10.3% |
| 8. | Cairo International Airport | Cairo | Egypt | CAI/HECA | 26,000,000 | Steady | ▲29.9% |
| 9. | Abu Dhabi International Airport | Abu Dhabi | United Arab Emirates | AUH/OMAA | 22,935,316 | ▲1 | ▲47.6% |
| 10 | David Ben Gurion International Airport | Tel Aviv | Israel | TLV/LLBG | 21,088,237 | ▼1 | ▲9.7% |
| 11. | Kuwait International Airport | Kuwait City | Kuwait | KWI/OKKK | 15,616,800 | Steady | ▲8.0% |
| 12. | Sharjah International Airport | Sharjah | United Arab Emirates | SHJ/OMSJ | 15,356,212 | Steady | ▲17.7% |
| 13. | Muscat International Airport | Muscat | Oman | MCT/OOMS | 12,600,000 | ▲4 | ▲46.5% |
| 14. | Mehrabad International Airport^{*} | Tehran | Iran | THR/OIII | 12,355,296 | ▼1 | ▼0.6% |
| 15. | Ankara Esenboğa Airport | Ankara | Turkey | ESB/LTAC | 11,950,940 | ▲1 | ▲37.3% |
| 16. | King Fahd International Airport | Dammam | Saudi Arabia | DMM/OEDF | 10,900,000 | ▼2 | ▲9.0% |
| 17. | İzmir Adnan Menderes Airport | İzmir | Turkey | ADB/LTBJ | 10,556,199 | ▼2 | ▲8.7% |
| 18. | Queen Alia International Airport | Amman | Jordan | AMM/OJAI | 9,500,000 | Steady | ▲21.2% |
| 19. | Prince Mohammad bin Abdulaziz International Airport | Medina | Saudi Arabia | MED/OEMA | 9,423,410 | ▲3 | ▲48.6% |
| 20. | Bahrain International Airport | Muharraq | Bahrain | BAH/OBBI | 8,700,000 | Steady | ▲26.1% |
| 21. | Hurghada International Airport | Hurghada | Egypt | HRG/HEGN | 8,700,000 | ▼2 | ▲21.4% |
| 22. | Larnaca International Airport | Larnaca | Cyprus | LCA/LCLK | 8,100,000 | ▲2 | ▲34.2% |
| 23. | Imam Khomeini International Airport^{*} | Tehran | Iran | IKA/OIIE | 7,429,391 | Steady | ▲19.6% |
| 24. | Beirut–Rafic Hariri International Airport | Beirut | Lebanon | BEY/OLBA | 7,100,000 | ▼2 | ▲11.8% |
| 25. | Mashhad Shahid Hasheminejad International Airport^{*} | Mashhad | Iran | MHD/OIMM | 7,074.816 | Steady | ▲18.5% |
| 26. | Sharm El Sheikh International Airport | Sharm El Sheikh | Egypt | SSH/HESH | 5,900,000 | Steady | ▲31.1% |
| 27. | Dalaman Airport | Dalaman | Turkey | DLM/LTBS | 5,235,558 | Steady | ▲16.0% |

^*Data for Iranian airports is of year 1402 of Solar Hijri calendar.

== 2022 statistics ==
| Rank | Airport | City served | Country | Code (IATA/ICAO) | Total passengers | Rank change | % change |
|---|---|---|---|---|---|---|---|
| 1. | Dubai International Airport | Dubai | United Arab Emirates | DXB/OMDB | 66,069,981 | ▲1 | ▲127.0% |
| 2. | Istanbul Airport | Istanbul | Turkey | IST/LTFM | 64,518,073 | ▼1 | ▲73.5% |
| 3. | Hamad International Airport | Doha | Qatar | DOH/OTHH | 35,730,482 | ▲3 | ▲101.8% |
| 4. | King Abdulaziz International Airport | Jeddah | Saudi Arabia | JED/OEJN | 31,648,324 | ▲3 | ▲134.6% |
| 5. | Antalya Airport | Antalya | Turkey | AYT/LTAI | 31,108,181 | ▼1 | ▲41.3% |
| 6. | Istanbul Sabiha Gökçen International Airport | Istanbul | Turkey | SAW/LTFJ | 30,737,854 | ▼3 | ▲23.4% |
| 7. | King Khalid International Airport | Riyadh | Saudi Arabia | RUH/OERK | 26,299,612 | ▼2 | ▲63.5% |
| 8. | Cairo International Airport | Cairo | Egypt | CAI/HECA | 20,009,336 | TBU | ▲76.4% |
| 9. | David Ben Gurion International Airport | Tel Aviv | Israel | TLV/LLBG | 20,008,532 | TBU | ▲197.8% |
| 10. | Abu Dhabi International Airport | Abu Dhabi | United Arab Emirates | AUH/OMAA | 15,540,000 | TBU | ▲202.0% |
| 11. | Kuwait International Airport | Kuwait City | Kuwait | KWI/OKKK | 14,460,000 | TBU | ▲306.1% |
| 12. | Sharjah International Airport | Sharjah | United Arab Emirates | SHJ/OMSJ | 13,000,000 | TBU | ▲84.7% |
| 13. | Mehrabad International Airport | Tehran | Iran | THR/OIII | 12,430,000 | TBU | ▲13.0% |
| 14. | King Fahd International Airport | Dammam | Saudi Arabia | DMM/OEDF | 10,000,000 | TBU | ▲66.7% |
| 15. | İzmir Adnan Menderes Airport | İzmir | Turkey | ADB/LTBJ | 9,834,578 | TBU | ▲29.9% |
| 16. | Ankara Esenboğa Airport | Ankara | Turkey | ESB/LTAC | 8,679,594 | TBU | ▲23.5% |
| 17. | Muscat International Airport | Muscat | Oman | MCT/OOMS | 8,600,000 | TBU | ▲132.0% |
| 18. | Queen Alia International Airport | Amman | Jordan | AMM/OJAI | 7,837,501 | TBU | ▲71.9% |
| 19. | Hurghada International Airport | Hurghada | Egypt | HRG/HEGN | 7,164,088 | TBU | ▲46.0% |
| 20. | Bahrain International Airport | Manama | Bahrain | BAH/OBBI | 6,900,000 | TBU | ▲127.5% |
| 21. | Beirut–Rafic Hariri International Airport | Beirut | Lebanon | BEY/OLBA | 6,349,799 | TBU | ▲47.0% |
| 22. | Prince Mohammad bin Abdulaziz International Airport | Medina | Saudi Arabia | MED/OEMA | 6,340,684 | TBU | ▲24.4% |
| 23. | Imam Khomeini International Airport | Tehran | Iran | IKA/OIIE | 6,211,927 | TBU | ▲205.0% |
| 24. | Larnaca International Airport | Larnaca | Cyprus | LCA/LCLK | 6,037,133 | TBU | ▲68.1% |
| 25. | Mashhad Shahid Hasheminejad International Airport | Mashhad | Iran | MHD/OIMM | 5,970,000 | TBU | TBU |

== See also ==
=== Busiest Airports by Country ===
- List of the busiest airports in Iran
- List of the busiest airports in Israel
- List of the busiest airports in Turkey

=== Busiest Airports by Region ===
- List of the busiest airports in the world
- List of the busiest airports in Africa
- List of the busiest airports in Asia
- List of the busiest airports in Europe
