= Jazeera Airways =

Kuwaiti airline

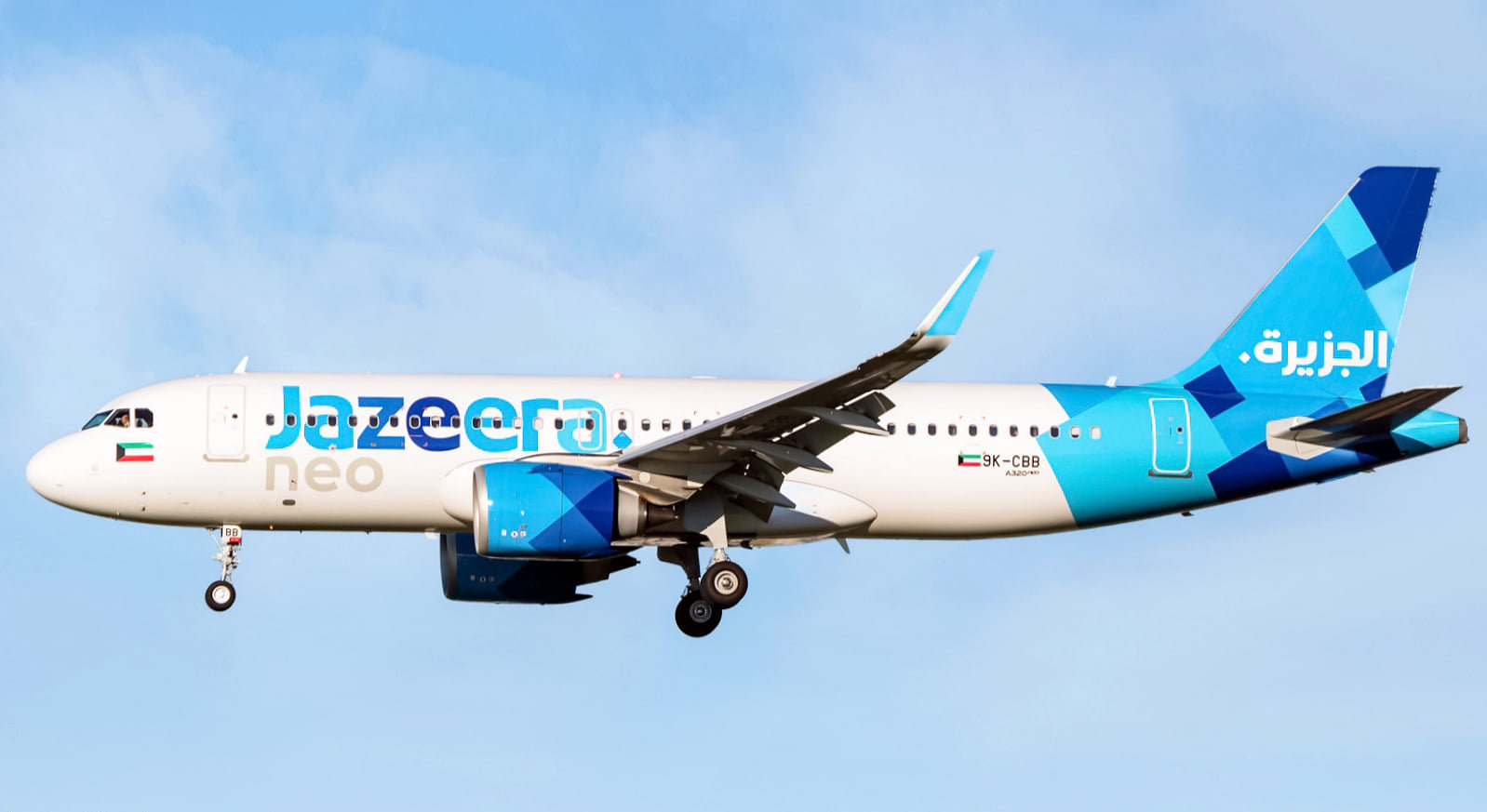
IATA	ICAO	Call sign
J9	JZR	JAZEERA
- Founded: 2004; 22 years ago
- Hubs: Kuwait International Airport
- Fleet size: 22
- Destinations: 57
- Parent company: Boodai Group
- Headquarters: Kuwait International Airport
- Key people: Marwan Boodai (Chairman) Barathan Pasupathi (CEO) Mithun Sudhevan (CFO)
- Website: www.jazeeraairways.com

Jazeera Airways K.S.C (Arabic: طيران الجزيرة) is a Kuwaiti low-cost airline with its head office on the premises of Kuwait International Airport in Al Farwaniyah Governorate, Kuwait. It operates scheduled services in the Middle East, Nepal, Pakistan, Bangladesh, India, Sri Lanka and Europe. Its main base is Kuwait International Airport. The airline has grown since its launch to become Kuwait's second national airline. Jazeera Airways is one of the largest operators at Kuwait Airport, having handled a quarter of all aircraft movements and passengers at the airport during July 2009. According to the July 2009 report issued by Kuwait Directorate General for Civil Aviation's, Jazeera Airways had the largest number of aircraft movement in the month with 1,834 take-offs and landings, 4% higher in terms of aircraft movement than the second-largest carrier.

== History ==
In 2004 the Kuwait Government permitted the establishment of the non-governmental airline firm, essentially ending Kuwait's 50-year-old dependency on Kuwait Airways. The 2004 Emiree Decree #89 established Jazeera Airways as the first airline to enter this newly liberalized industry.

Jazeera Airways raised its capital of KD 10 million (US$35 million) through an initial public offering in Kuwait that was oversubscribed 12 times. The capital was doubled to KD 20 million (US$70 million) in 4Q 2007 by a second offering to existing shareholders. In May 2009, a share distribution of 10% effectively increased the capital to KD 22 million (US$77 million).

About 26% of the airline is owned by two companies affiliated with the Boodai Group: Wings Finance (9%) and Boodai Projects (17%). 6-7% is also held by Jasem M. al-Mousa Trading, a company owned by a former Minister of Public Works in the first Kuwaiti government established after the end of Iraq's invasion of Kuwait. About 17.5% is held by two real estate companies, and the rest is publicly held.

Jazeera Airways started operations on 30 October 2005 with a fleet of brand new Airbus A320 aircraft, all leather seats, flying to several destinations in the Middle East.

In Q2 2009, UAE authorities requested the airline to terminate its hub operations in Dubai. This step was seen as a support to Dubai's upcoming launch of its own low-cost airline, FlyDubai. Jazeera Airways changed its operation model by concentrating on its Kuwait hub and trying to launch a second hub somewhere else. By Q2 2010, the new model proved unprofitable as the Kuwait hub suffered from overcapacity. The airline changed its plans by cancelling many stations and parking some aircraft which were later returned to their lessors.

== Destinations ==
Jazeera Airways flies to destinations across the Middle East and Europe from its base in Kuwait. Since 2018, the company has expanded its available routes.

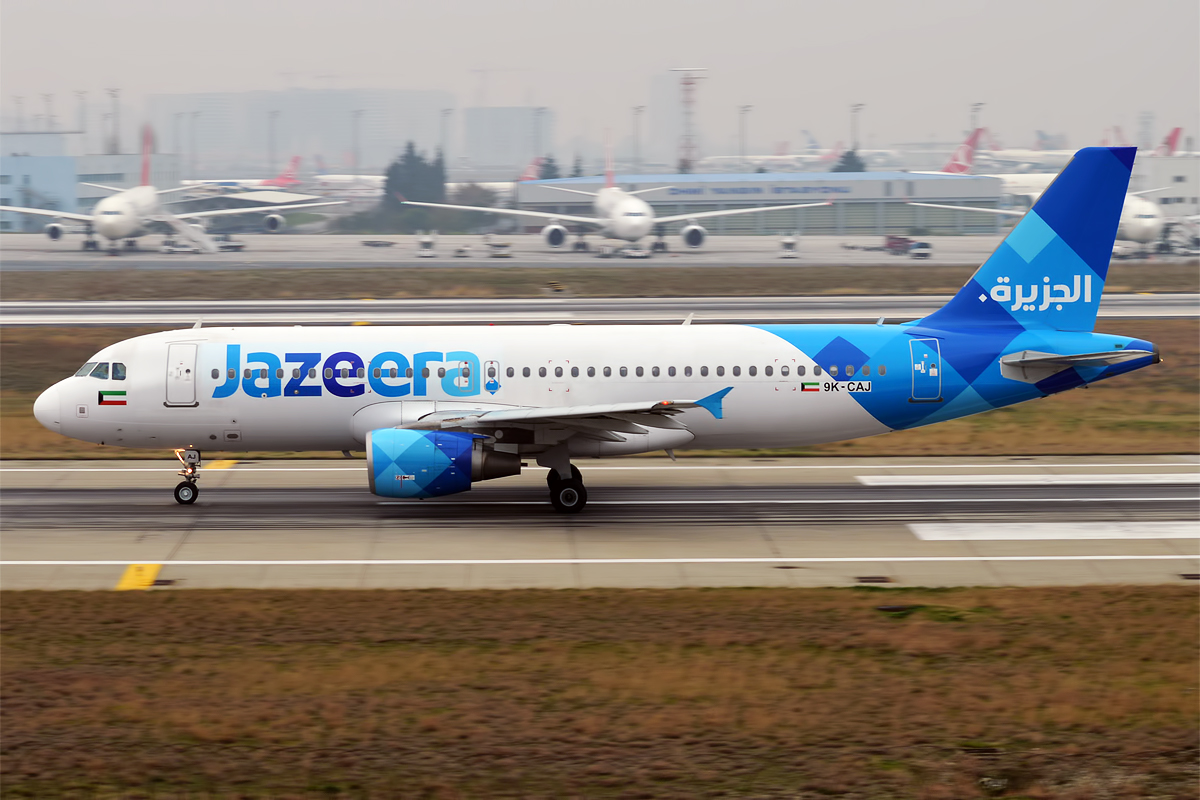
A Jazeera Airways Airbus A320 aircraft

In October 2019, Jazeera Airways launched its first flight to London, bringing the first new service from Kuwait to the UK in 55 years. It operated the flight to London Gatwick Airport's South Terminal with its newest A320neo aircraft. This service has now been terminated.

On 24 February 2021, the airline started flying to Colombo, Sri Lanka.

=== Interline agreements ===
- Hahn Air

== Dedicated terminal ==
In 2018, Jazeera Airways opened its own dedicated terminal at Kuwait International Airport. The facility is claimed to be the first owned, built and operated by a private airline in the Middle East. It features a dedicated check-in hall for Jazeera passengers, a business class lounge, direct access to Jazeera boarding gates, and a car park with 350 spaces connected by a sky bridge.

== Fleet ==
As of July 2026, Jazeera Airways operates the following aircraft:

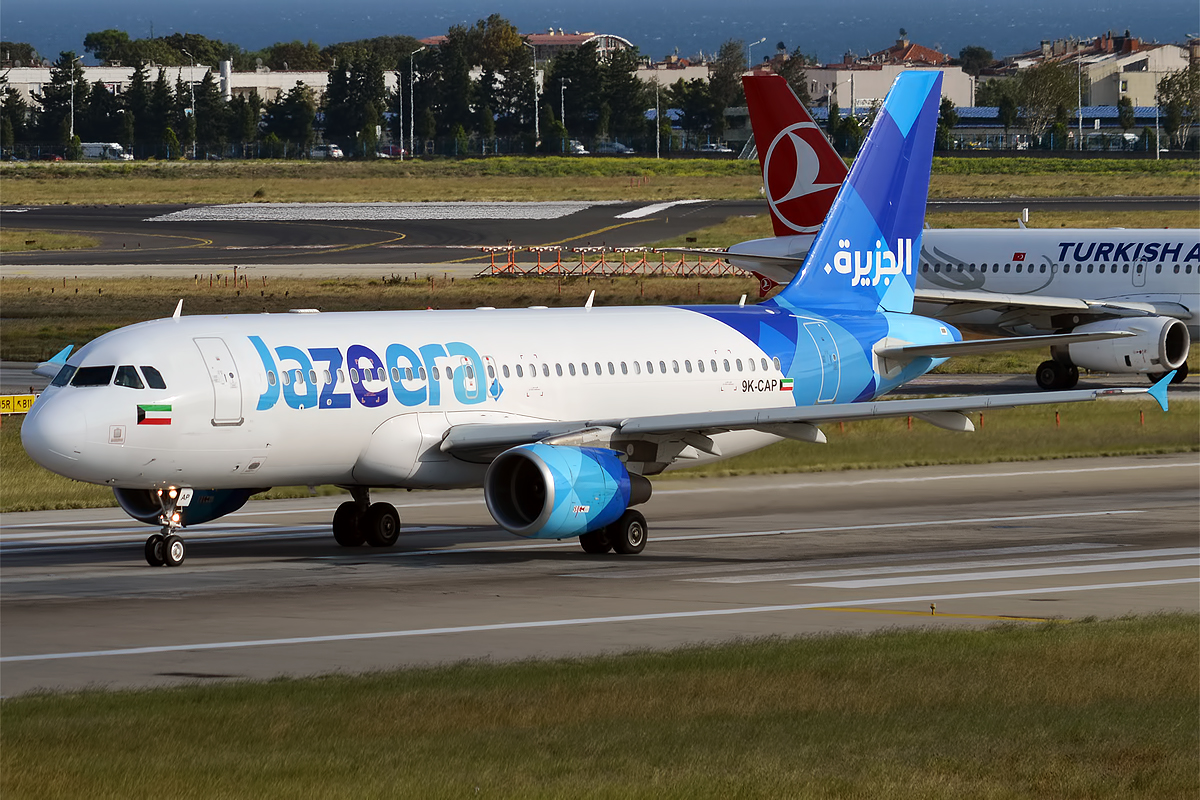
A Jazeera Airways Airbus A320-214 aircraft in 2018

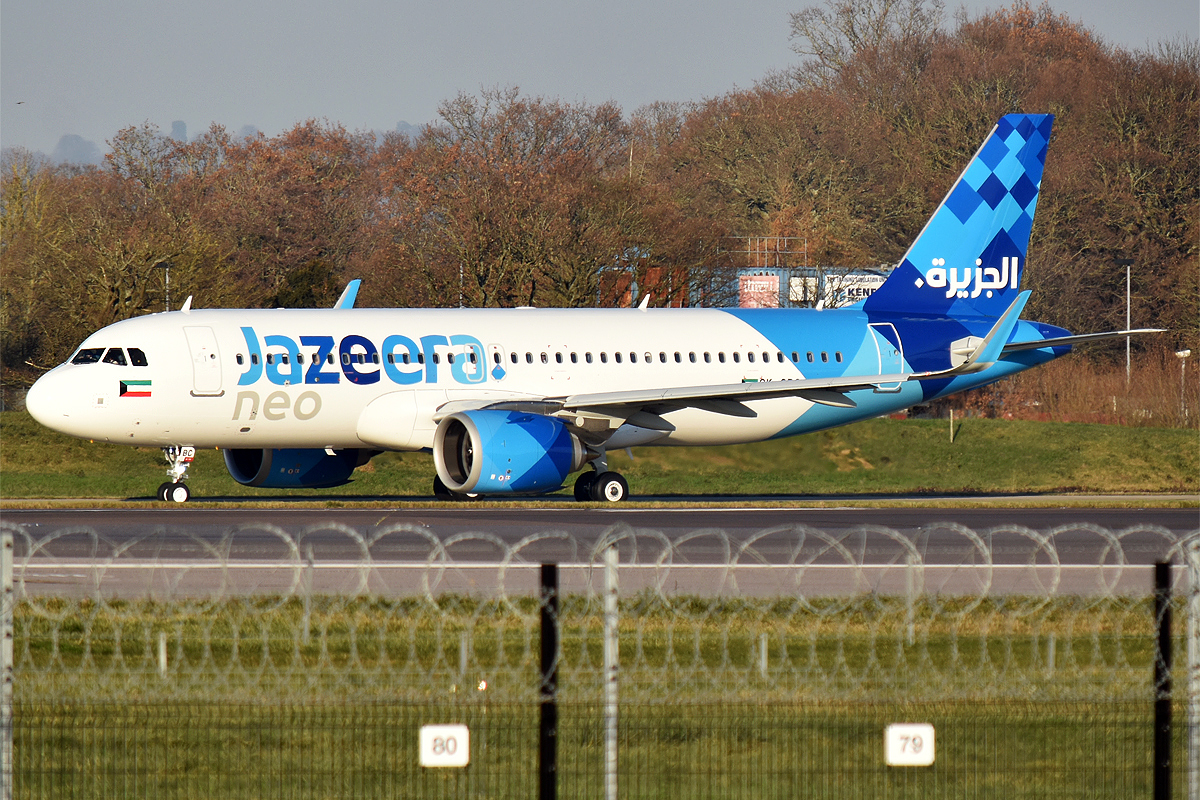
A Jazeera Airways Airbus A320neo aircraft

Jazeera Airways fleet
Aircraft	In service	Orders	Passengers			Notes
Aircraft	In service	Orders	C	Y	Total	Notes
Airbus A320-200	11	—	12	147	159	To be replaced by Airbus A320neo family.
Airbus A320-200	11	—	—	165	165	To be replaced by Airbus A320neo family.
Airbus A320neo	11	18	12	150	162	Order with 5 options. Deliveries began in 2018. To replace older A320ceo aircraft.
Airbus A321neo	—	8	TBA			Deliveries expected to begin in 2023. To replace older A320ceo aircraft.
Total	22	26				

=== Fleet development ===
The last of the A320ceos was delivered by Airbus on 11 January 2010.

The airline's fleet is powered by CFM56-5B engines. All of Jazeera Airways aircraft are fitted with 165 leather seats, and split into two cabins: Jazeera and Jazeera Business. When Jazeera Business is offered, six seats are removed to provide 12 Plus seats in addition to 147 Economy seats.

Jazeera Airways ordered 30 Airbus A320s on 18 June 2007. This was announced at the Paris Air Show bringing its total orders up to 35 Airbus A320s.

During 2010, due to the airline's change of operation plans, several aircraft were parked, and eventually, five were returned to lessor Sahaab which subsequently leased them to Virgin America and SriLankan Airlines.

In April 2011, Jazeera Airways canceled 25 of the 40 A320s it ordered in 2007. Jazeera took delivery of four A320s still on order from 2012 to 2014.

In 2018, Jazeera Airways took delivery of the first Airbus A320neo aircraft in the Middle East and employed it on their Dubai route. In September 2019, Jazeera also planned to order the A321LR. They also started their longest A320 family route which is 6 hours from its hub in Kuwait to London Gatwick.

=== Former fleet ===
As of August 2025, Jazeera Airways operated 13 Airbus A320 and 11 Airbus A320neo.

== Cabins ==
The airline offers business and economy class seating. The economy class seating has leather seats and shareable TV screens. Business class seats have leather seats and personal TV screens and two seats per row.

Jazeera Airways is one of the few airlines which does not serve alcoholic beverages on its flights.

== Accidents and incidents ==
On 2 August 2018, Jazeera flight (J9 608) from Kuwait caught fire in its right engine on landing at Hyderabad. All 145 passengers were evacuated safely and the fire was extinguished.
