= Kuwait Airways =

Flag carrier airline of Kuwait

Kuwait Airways الخطوط الجوية الكويتية al-Khuṭūṭ al-Jawiyyah al-Kuwaītiyyah

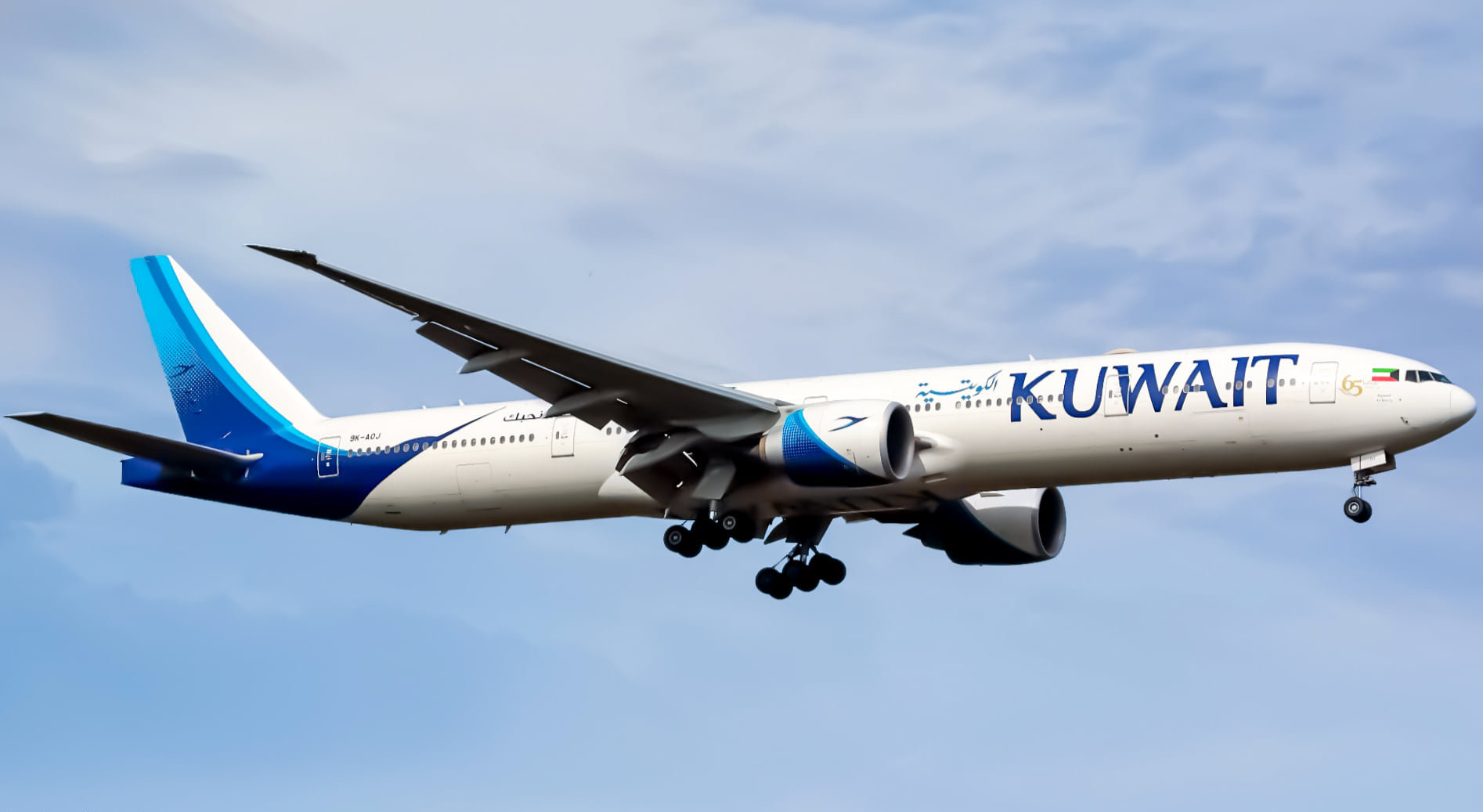
- Kuwait Airways Boeing 777-300ER
IATA	ICAO	Call sign
KU	KAC	KUWAITI
- Founded: 1953; 73 years ago (as Kuwait National Airways)
- Commenced operations: 16 March 1954; 72 years ago
- Hubs: Kuwait International Airport
- Frequent-flyer program: Oasis Club
- Fleet size: 36
- Destinations: 52
- Parent company: Kuwait Airways Corporation (KAC)
- Headquarters: Al Farwaniyah Governorate, Kuwait
- Key people: Abdulmohsen Salem Alfagaan (chairman)
- Website: www.kuwaitairways.com

Kuwait Airways (Arabic: الخطوط الجوية الكويتية, al-Ḫuṭūṭ al-Jawiyyah al-Kuwaītiyyah) is the flag carrier of Kuwait, wholly owned by the government of Kuwait. Its head office is situated on the grounds of Kuwait International Airport, Al Farwaniyah Governorate. It operates scheduled international services throughout the Middle East, to the Indian subcontinent, Europe, Southeast Asia and North America, from its main base at Kuwait International Airport.

== History ==
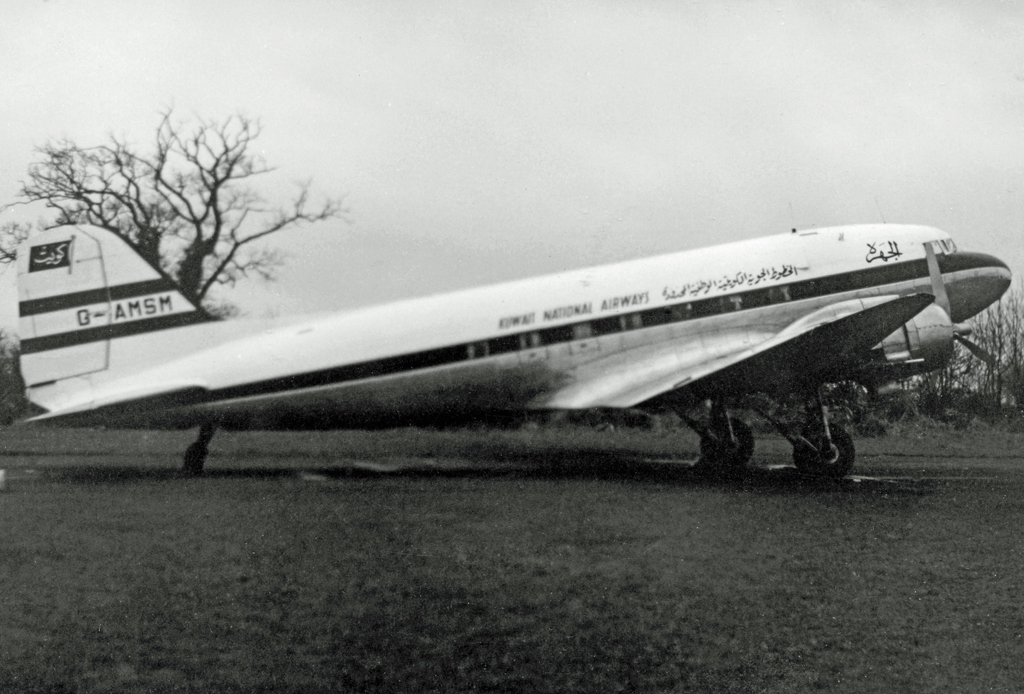
Kuwait National Airways Douglas DC-3 in 1955

The carrier traces its history back to 1953, (Note: Also mentioned to have been formed in March 1954.) when Kuwait National Airways was formed by a group of Kuwaiti businessmen; initially, the government took a 50% interest. That year, a five-year management contract was signed with British International Airlines (BIA), a BOAC subsidiary in Kuwait that operated charter flights and provided maintenance services. Two Dakotas were bought, and operations started on 16 March 1954. The carrier transported 8,966 passengers in its first year of operations. In July 1955, the name Kuwait Airways was adopted. (Note: Renaming has also been reported to have taken place in March 1957.) In May 1958, a new contract for management and operation was signed, directly with BOAC this time. BIA was taken over by Kuwait Airways in April 1959. (Note: Also reported to have been taken over by Kuwait Airways in September the same year.)

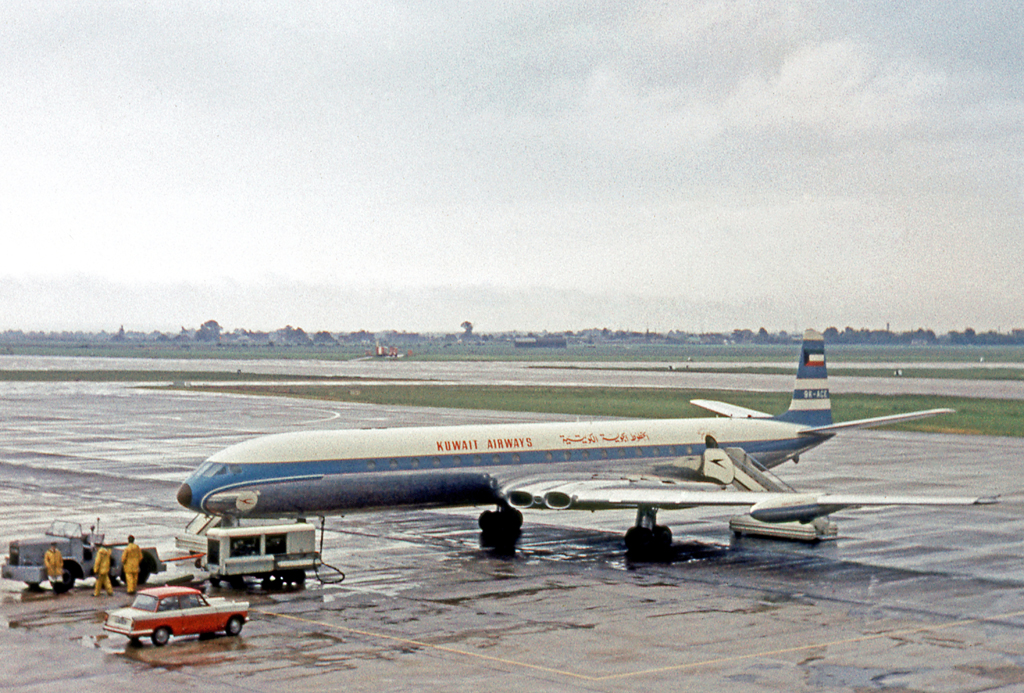
Kuwait Airways De Havilland DH.106 Comet 4C at London Heathrow Airport in 1964

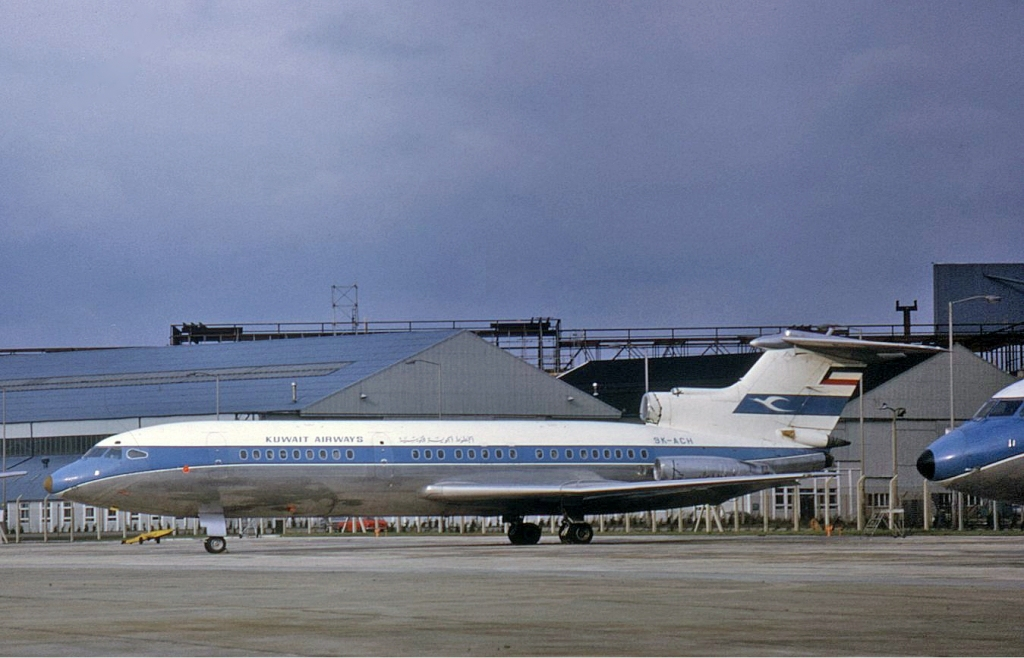
A Kuwait Airways Trident at London Heathrow in 1974

On 8 August 1962, Kuwait Airways became the first foreign customer to order the Trident when two aircraft of the type were acquired, and an option for a third was taken. The deal was valued at £5.5 million, and also included a Comet 4C. At the same time, the carrier also had a £3 million order in place for three BAC One-Elevens, with an option for a fourth. The airline took delivery of the first Comet of its own in January 1963, but Comet operations had started in July the previous year with an aircraft on lease from MEA. In August 1963, a second Comet was ordered. The delivery of this second airframe established an unofficial record in early 1964 when it flew between London and Kuwait, a distance of 2,888 miles (4,648 km), at 461 miles per hour (742 km/h) on average. On 1 June 1963, the government increased its participation in the airline to 100%. In March 1964, the carrier added its first European destination to the route network when flights to London were inaugurated using Comet equipment; from that time, services between London and some points in the Middle East, including Abadan, Bahrain, Beirut, Dhahran, Doha and Kuwait, started being operated in a pool agreement between the carrier and BOAC and MEA. A month later, the airline absorbed Trans Arabia Airways.

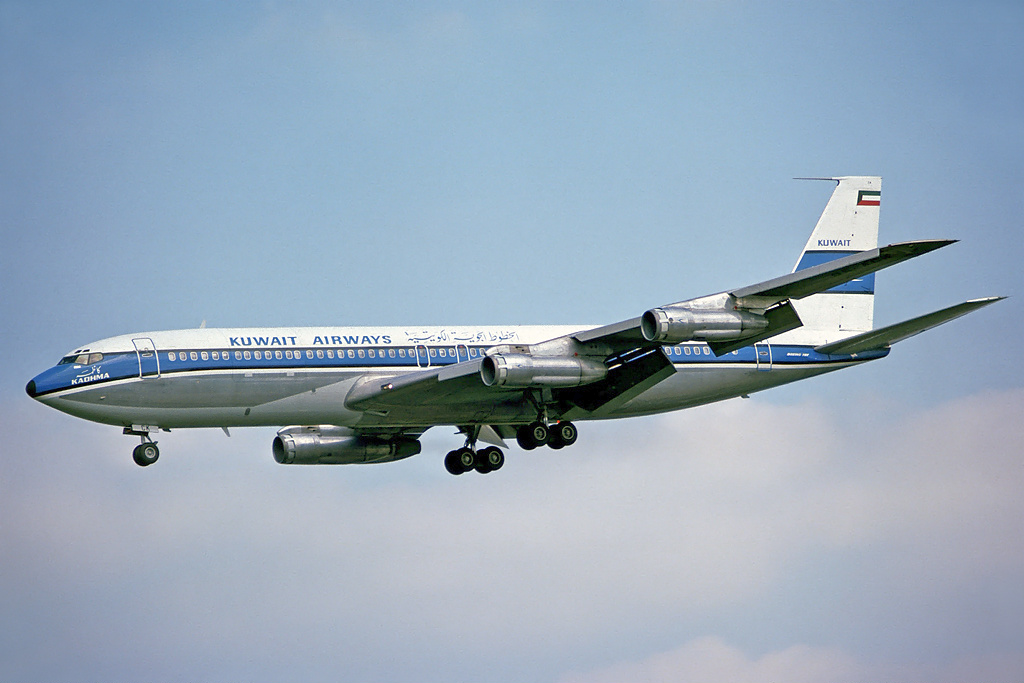
A Kuwait Airways Boeing 707-320C in 1978. Three aircraft of the type were ordered in November 1967.

In April 1965, the route network had expanded to include Abadan, Baghdad, Bahrain, Beirut, Bombay, Cairo, Damascus, Doha, Frankfurt, Geneva, Jerusalem, Karachi, London, Paris and Tehran. At this time, the fleet comprised two Comet 4Cs, three DC-6Bs, two Twin Pioneers and three Viscount 700s; the carrier had two Trident 1Es and three One-Elevens pending delivery. The first Trident was handed over by the aircraft manufacturer in March 1966, and the second followed in May the same year. In the interim, a third aircraft of the type was ordered. On the other hand, the One-Elevens were never delivered: in January 1966, the carrier stated that the simultaneous introduction of both types of aircraft was not possible due to a tightened budget, and postponed their delivery; it was informed late that year that the airline would not take them. (Note: These aircraft were leased to British Eagle.) Three Boeing 707-320Cs were ordered in November 1967. The carrier made its first profit ever in 1968, with a net income of £910,000.

During 1972, Kuwait Airways' fifth consecutive profitable year, the airline had a net profit of £2.9 million. By May 1973, the fleet had reduced to five Boeing 707-320C aircraft. That year, flights to Colombo were launched. In March 1975, Faisal Saud Al-Fulaij, who employed 1,800, was the corporation's chairman. In a deal worth US$14 million, two additional ex-Pan American Boeing 707-320Cs were subsequently purchased that year, with the first one entering the fleet in May. The carrier ordered its first Boeing 737 that year, slated for delivery in February 1976. Kuwait Airways became the Boeing 727's 96th worldwide customer in 1979 when it ordered three of these aircraft for delivery in late 1980 and early 1981.

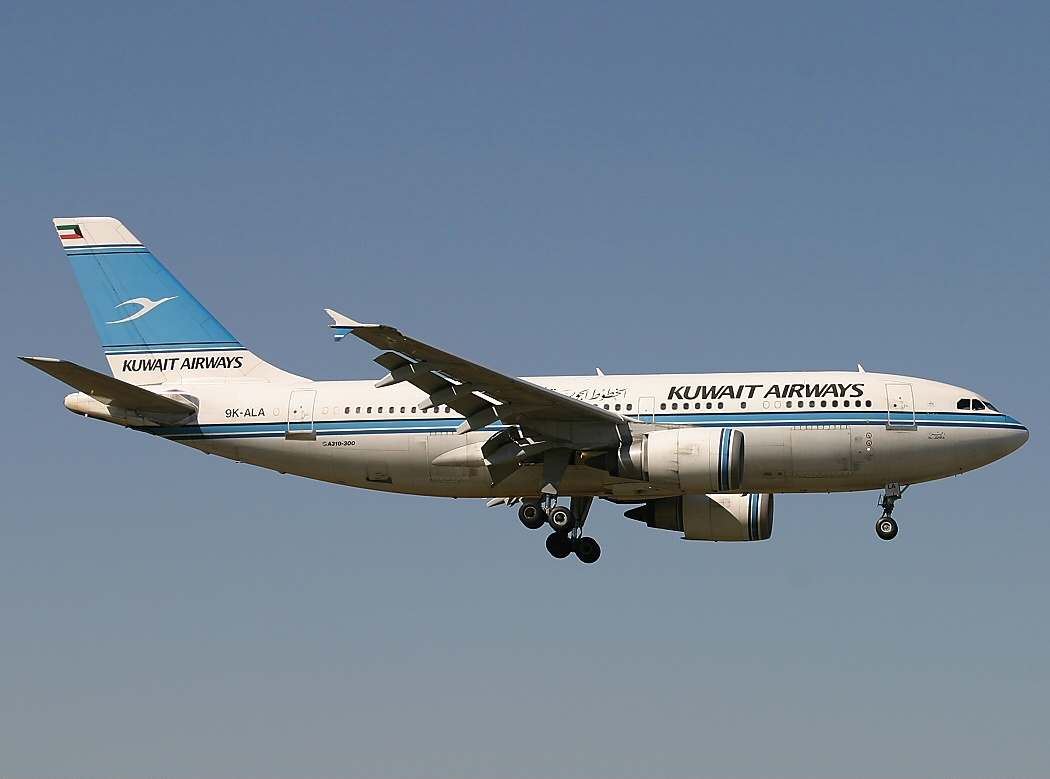
A Kuwait Airways Airbus A310-300, 2004

By July 1980, chairmanship was held by Ghassan Al-Nissef, the number of employees had grown to 5,400 and the fleet comprised eight Boeing 707-320Cs, one Boeing 737-200, three Boeing 747-200Bs and one JetStar; three Boeing 727-200s were pending delivery. In mid 1980, six Airbus A310-200s were ordered to replace the Boeing 707s on routes to Asia, Europe and the Middle East, with deliveries starting in 1983; five more A310 aircraft were added to the order late that year.

After India's air market was deregulated in 1992, Kuwait Airways and Gulf Air participated in the formation of Jet Airways, each holding a 20% equity stake, with a total investment estimated at US$8 million. Following the enactment of a law that banned the investment of foreign carriers in domestic Indian operators, both airlines had to divest their shareholding in the Indian company. Kuwait Airways' 20% stake in Jet Airways was sold to the chairman Naresh Goyal for US$4 million.

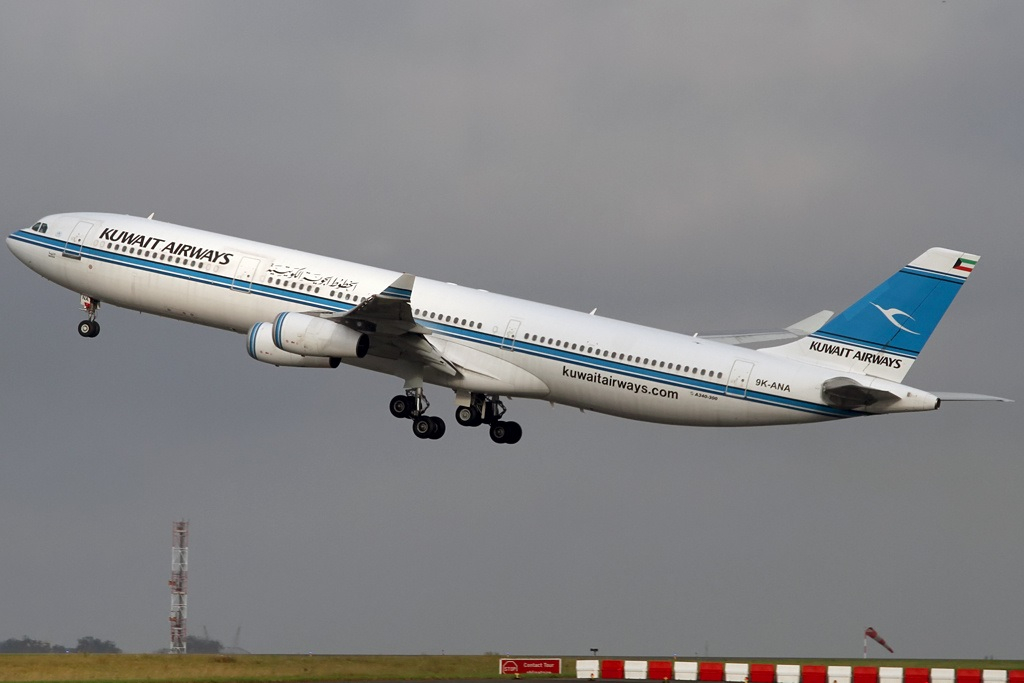
Kuwait Airways Airbus A340-300, 2014. The carrier received the first aircraft of the type in March 1995.

In July 1996, the carrier modified a previous order that included Boeing 747 aircraft, and placed an order worth US$280 million for two Boeing 777-200s, with purchase rights for another aircraft of the type. The operation made Kuwait Airways the 22nd customer of the type worldwide. The airframer handed over the first Boeing 777-200 in early 1998. In December 1998, a code-share agreement was signed with Trans World Airlines to begin in the spring of 1999.

In October 2007, the new CEO pledged that the airline should be privatised to compete efficiently against other airlines. He says that the airline will encounter difficulty in advancing, especially in fleet renewal, without privatisation.

Flights to Iraq were resumed in November 2013; Kuwait Airways had discontinued services to the country in 1990 following the invasion of Kuwait. After a 17-year hiatus, the carrier resumed flying to Munich in July 2015. Also in July 2015, the airline restarted flights to Istanbul-Atatürk; the city had not been served for three years. Bangalore was added to the carrier's network in October 2015.

Since Kuwait does not recognise Israel, Kuwait Airways does not allow Israeli passport-holders to fly with them. Per Kuwaiti law, no agreement, commercial or otherwise, can be entered into between Kuwaitis and individuals either residing in Israel or holding Israeli citizenship. The Department of Transportation of the United States of America claimed in 2015 that the refusal of Kuwait Airways to sell tickets to Israeli passport holders on certain routes apparently amounted to "discrimination", ordering the airline to stop denying transport to Israeli citizens. In response, the airline cited Kuwaiti law while upholding its decision, discontinued its JFK–London service in 2015, and later won a 2017 German court case upholding its right to deny Israeli passport holders transit through Kuwait. The German court was subsequently accused of endorsing antisemitism.

== Corporate affairs and identity ==
=== Ownership ===
Kuwait Airways is wholly owned by the government of Kuwait, as of August 2023.

==== Privatisation plans ====
Privatisation started being considered in the mid 1990s, in a period that followed the Gulf War when the carrier experienced a heavy loss on its assets. The company was turned into a corporation in 2004. A draft decree for its privatisation was approved by the government on 21 July 2008. Plans were to sell up to 35% of the stake to a long-term investor and another 40% allotted to the public, whereas the government would hold the remaining 25%. These plans also contemplated the exclusion of domestic carrier competitors, such as Jazeera Airways, as potential bidders. Furthermore, the government also committed to keeping the workforce invariant for at least five years and those who were not to be retained would be offered the opportunity to be transferred to other government dependencies without altering their salaries and holding similar working conditions.

In 2011, the privatisation committee valued the carrier at US$805 million, following advice by the Citigroup, Ernst & Young and Seabury. The process was expected to be concluded by March 2011. However, in October that year, the committee recommended the airline to go through a reorganisation process before continuing with the privatisation programme, something that was approved by Kuwait's Council of Ministers. The privatisation draft was amended and the government signed a contract with the International Air Transport Association for the provision of consultation expertise. The law for the privatisation of Kuwait Airways Corporation was passed in January 2013.

=== Key people ===
As of November 2023, Abdulmohsen Salem Alfagaan holds the position as chairman.

=== Headquarters ===
The Kuwait Airways headquarters is located on the grounds of Kuwait International Airport in Al Farwaniyah Governorate, Kuwait. The 42,000 square metres (450,000 sq ft) head office was built for 15.8 million Kuwaiti dinars (US $ 53.6 million). Ahmadiah Contracting & Trading Co. served as the main contractor. The headquarter was constructed from 1992 to 1996. The construction of the head office was the first time that structural glazing for curtain walls was used in the State of Kuwait. The previous headquarters was on the grounds of the airport.

=== Subsidiaries and alliances ===
Kuwait Airways has several subsidiaries that are going through a similar privatization process as KAC.

- Kuwait Aviation Services Co. (KASCO)
- Automated Systems Co. (ASC, شركة الأنظمـــــة الآلية,الأنظمة) GDS provider since 1989
- ALAFCO

Kuwait Airways also went into alliances with several airlines to keep up with demand and to continue its operations during the 1990 war.

- Shorouk Air (ceased operations in 2003)
- Jet Airways (India, temporarily suspended)
- Trans World Airlines (began 1 December 1999 with codeshare between JFK and Chicago to Kuwait City)

=== Livery ===
The airline revamped its livery on 23 October 2016, updating the stylised bird logo.

== Destinations ==
Kuwait Airways is based at Kuwait International Airport; the airline flies 65 routes that serve 63 destinations, as of August 2023.

=== Codeshare agreements ===
Kuwait Airways has codeshare agreements with the following airlines:

- Aegean Airlines
- Air Europa
- Etihad Airways
- Ethiopian Airlines
- ITA Airways
- Middle East Airlines
- Oman Air
- Saudia
- SriLankan Airlines
- Thai Airways International
- Turkish Airlines

=== Interline agreements ===
Kuwait Airways has interline agreements with the following airlines:

- Air Canada
- Air China
- Air Europa
- Air India
- American Airlines
- APG Airlines
- Asiana Airlines
- Bangkok Airways
- Biman Bangladesh Airlines
- Cathay Pacific
- China Airlines
- Deutsche Bahn (railway)
- EgyptAir
- Etihad Airways
- Ethiopian Airlines
- Gulf Air
- Emirates
- ITA Airways
- Kenya Airways
- Korean Air
- LOT Polish Airlines
- Lufthansa
- Malaysia Airlines
- Middle East Airlines
- Nepal Airlines
- Oman Air
- Qatar Airways
- Royal Air Maroc
- Saudia
- Singapore Airlines
- SriLankan Airlines
- Thai Airways International
- Tunisair
- Turkish Airlines
- United Airlines

== Fleet ==
Kuwait Airways Airbus A320neo

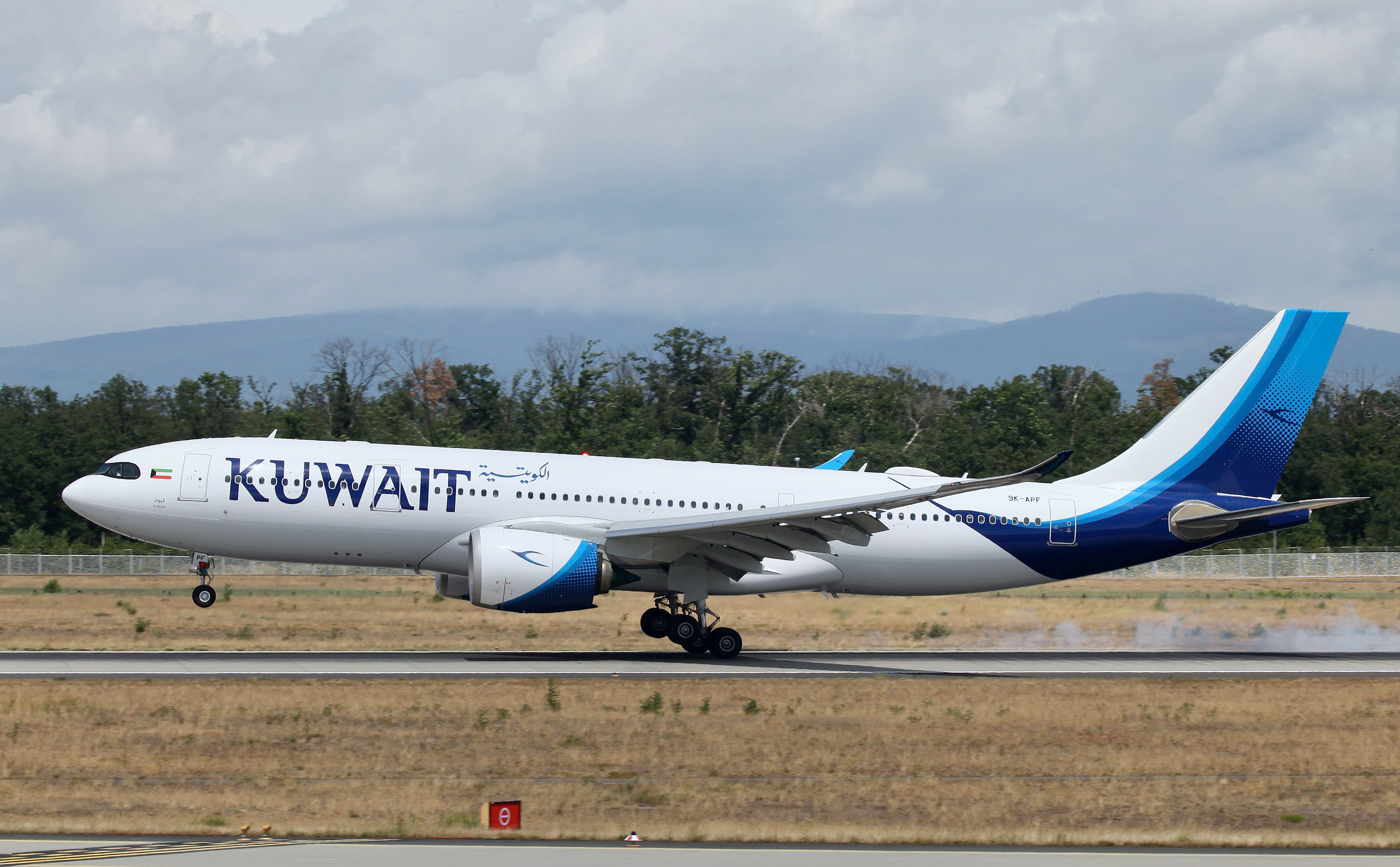
Kuwait Airways Airbus A330-800

Kuwait Airways Boeing 777-300ER

=== Current fleet ===
As of October 2026, the Kuwait Airways fleet includes the following aircraft:

Kuwait Airways fleet
Aircraft	In service	Orders	Passengers					Notes
Aircraft	In service	Orders	F	C	W	Y	Total	Notes
Airbus A320-200	4	—	Unknown					
Airbus A320neo	9	—	—	12	—	122	134	
Airbus A321neo	1	5	—	16	—	150	166	Deliveries from March 2025
Airbus A321LR	—	3	TBA				169	
Airbus A330-200	1	—	Unknown					
Airbus A330-800	4	—	—	32	—	203	235	Launch customer.
Airbus A330-900	6	1	—	32	21	225	278	Deliveries from December 2024.
Airbus A340-500/600	1	—	Unknown					
Airbus A350-900	—	2	TBA				326	
Boeing 777-300ER	10	—	8	36	54	236	334	
Total	36	11						

=== Former fleet ===
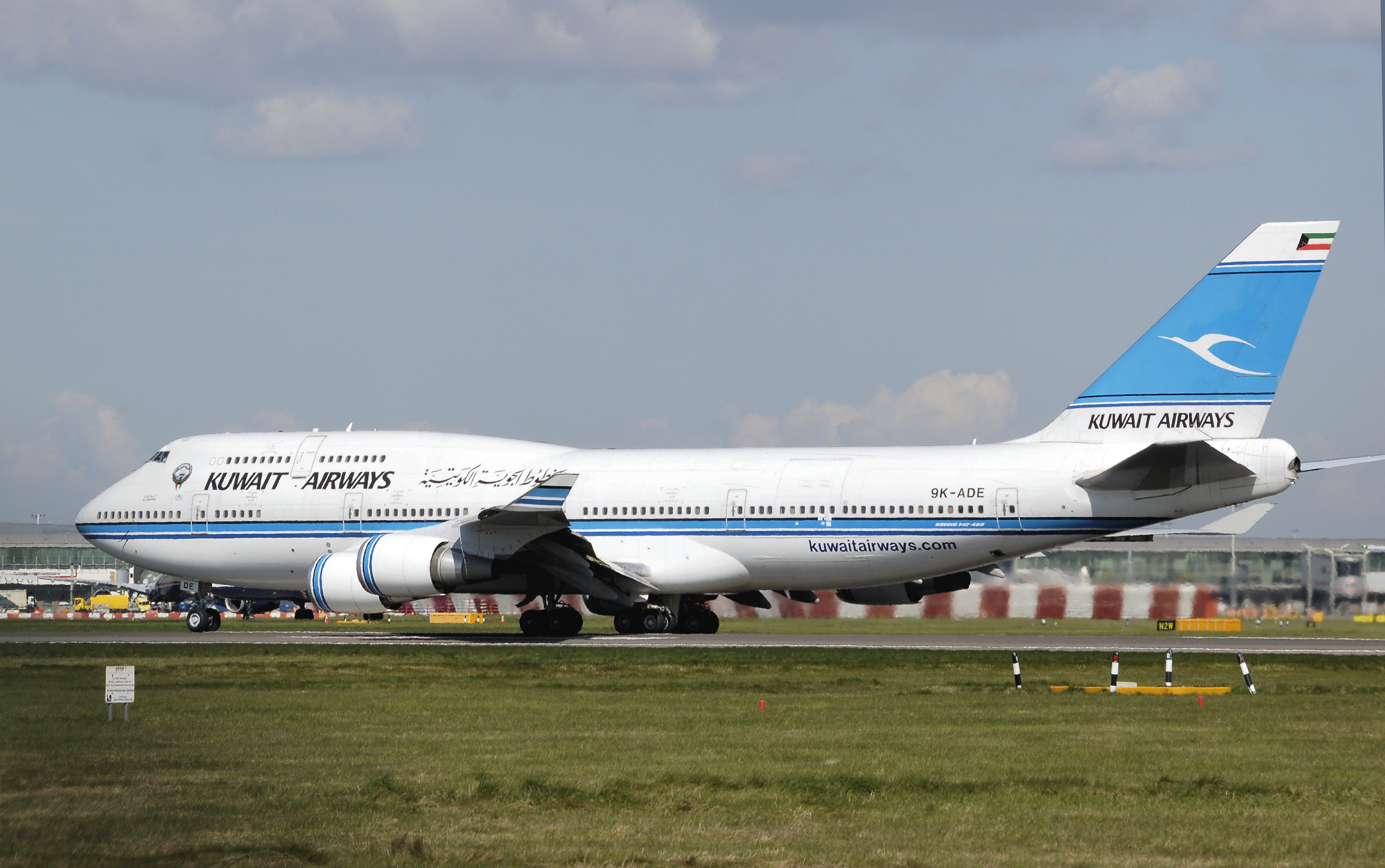
Kuwait Airways Boeing 747-400M

Aircraft	Total	Introduced	Retired	Notes
Airbus A300B4	1	1983	1983	Leased from Hapag-Lloyd Flug.
Airbus A300B4	1	1991	1992	Leased from EgyptAir.
Airbus A300-600R	8	1984	2015	
Airbus A310-200	8	1983	1990	
Airbus A310-300	8	1991	2015	
Airbus A340-300	4	1995	2017	
Boeing 707-320	5	1975	1978	Leased from British European Airways.
Boeing 707-320C	3	1977	1977	Leased from British European Airways and British Midland Airlines.
Boeing 707-320C	10	1968	1985	
Boeing 707-320C	6	1991	1992	Leased from Trans Mediterranean Airways.
Boeing 727-200	4	1980	1994	
Boeing 737-200	1	1976	1980	
Boeing 747-200M	4	1978	2008	
Boeing 747-400M	1	1994	2019	
Boeing 767-200ER	2	1986	1991	Destroyed by bombing in February 1991.
Boeing 767-200ER	1	1994	1995	
Boeing 777-200ER	2	1998	2017	
De Havilland Comet	3	1963	1969	One leased from BOAC.
Douglas C-47B Skytrain	2	1952	1970	
Douglas DC-6B	1	1964	1968	
Douglas DC-8-32	1	1974	1976	
Douglas DC-8-62F	3	1997	1999	Cargo aircraft.
Hawker Siddeley Trident	4	1965	1972	
Lockheed L-1011-200 TriStar	1	1992	1994	Leased from British Airways.
McDonnell Douglas DC-10-30	1	1992	1993	Leased from British Airways.
Vickers Viscount	10	1958	1967	

=== Fleet development ===
In October 2013, Kuwait Airways had one of the oldest aircraft fleets in the Middle East, with an average age of 20 years. That month, the carrier opened its maintenance facilities to the press for them to check that the fleet was kept in condition, amid rumours of deficiencies in their maintenance. In December the same year, the carrier signed a memorandum of understanding with Airbus for the acquisition of 15 A320neos and ten A350-900s. These aircraft would be handed over between 2019 and 2022. For the interim period, the deal includes the lease of seven A320s and five A330-200s from the aircraft manufacturer; deliveries would start in late 2014. In a deal valued at US$4.4 billion, the order including ten A350-900s and 15 A320neos was confirmed in February 2014. Kuwait Airways' intentions to purchase ten Boeing 777-300ERs were informed in November 2014. The order was firmed up a month later for US$3.3 billion with deliveries expected to start in November 2016. Also in December 2014, Kuwait Airways took delivery of its first sharkleted Airbus A320 as part of the airline's fleet renewal programme. By March 2015, Kuwait Airways received four leased aircraft of the type, marking the first fleet upgrade in 17 years. The carrier became a new customer for the Airbus A330 when it received the first aircraft of the type in June 2015.

Following the airline's rebranding initiative in October 2016, Kuwait Airways received its first Boeing 777-300ER in December 2016, marking the arrival of the airline's first fully owned new aircraft in nearly twenty years. Introduced in 1995, the Airbus A340-300 was retired from service by the airline in 2017. In October 2018, Kuwait Airways amended a pre-existing commitment with Airbus for 10 A350-900s by reducing it to five of these aircraft and ordered eight Airbus A330-800s, which were scheduled to be delivered from March 2019. The first two Airbus A330-800s were handed over to the airline by the aircraft manufacturer in October 2020.

In August 2019, Kuwait Airways Chairman Yousef A. M. J. Alsaqer stated that the airline plans to spend $2.5 billion on new aircraft due to be delivered by 2026.

== Services ==
Kuwait Airways offers Royal Class and First Class passengers the option to check-in at the comfort of their home in where a limousine and an airline crew member will check-in the passengers, collect the luggage, and issue boarding passes at home. A car service to drive passengers to the airport is also provided upon request. This service is only offered while outbound from Kuwait International Airport. Kuwait Airways is one of the few airlines which does not serve alcoholic drinks on its flights.

== Incidents and accidents ==
=== Kuwait Airways Flight 032 ===
On 30 June 1966, Kuwait Airways Flight KU32, a Hawker Siddeley Trident 1C, was operating a scheduled international flight from Beirut, Lebanon, to Kuwait City. The flight proceeded uneventfully until the descent phase. At 20:28 GMT, the aircraft was cleared to descend from FL300 to FL95 near the DY NDB, maintaining this altitude until passing the beacon at 20:39 GMT. The pilot-in-command elected to conduct a visual approach, and the crew reported sighting the airport’s rotating beacon and lights.

During the approach to Runway 33R, the aircraft was positioned six miles (9.7 km) from the airport at 2,300 feet (700 m) with an airspeed of 178 knots (330 km/h; 205 mph). The autopilot remained engaged, and the co-pilot was occupied with landing checks. The aircraft’s intended approach speed was 154 knots (285 km/h; 177 mph) with a (700 feet (210 m))/min descent rate, but it continued descending at (1,500 feet (460 m))/min. At 20:46 GMT, the aircraft impacted terrain approximately four km (2.5 mi) short of the runway threshold, slightly left of the centerline, at an elevation of 185 feet (56 m) feet.

The accident resulted from an unstable approach rate and failure to follow company regulations. The corrective action of calling for 10,500 rpm was insufficient to regain level flight, and a delayed power request was ineffective. The pilot-in-command did not follow approach procedures, with landing checks incomplete and an incorrect altimeter setting set during the incident, There were 72 passengers and 11 crew members on board with no deaths in the incident.

=== Kuwait Airways during the Iraqi Invasion of Kuwait ===
Kuwait Airways suffered blows during the Iraqi invasion of Kuwait, at least 15 aircraft were seized by Iraq and taken to be used by Iraqi Airways. The Revolutionary Command Council decided that the Kuwait Airways company would be dissolved and all its property would be transported to the Iraqi Airways Company. This made Kuwait Airways file two legal actions against Iraqi Airways, these legal actions would take almost 22 years to end and were only settled in 2017. An A310-300 and A300 were seized by Iraqi forces, repainted in the Iraqi Airways livery, and given new registrations by the Iraqi Directorate of Air Safety. Iraqi Airways started to prep the 2 planes for commercial services by regularly maintaining them. In July and August 1992, Iran returned six Toulouse-built jets to Kuwait Airways after Kuwait paid them $20 million for maintenance and storage. A pair of Tupolev Tu-124Vs, both G-IIIs, and one of the two BAe.125s were destroyed by coalition airstrikes during Operation Desert Storm. These planes ended up being written-off. Additionally, there was a Boeing 727 that was being used by Iraqi Airways before being ferried to Oman and later, returned to Kuwait after the war.

After the war Kuwait Airways sought to seek compensation for the lost planes, at first, Kuwait was seeking $1.2 billion. Iraq and Kuwait ended up settling on a deal that would see Iraq pay Kuwait $500 million. $300 million in cash and $200 million in a Kuwaiti-Iraqi airline venture.

== See also ==
- Transport in Kuwait
