= Kuwait International Airport =

International airport serving Kuwait

Kuwait International Airport مطار الكويت الدولي
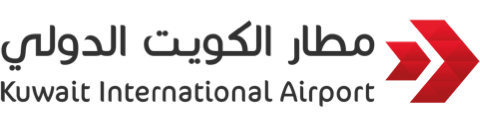

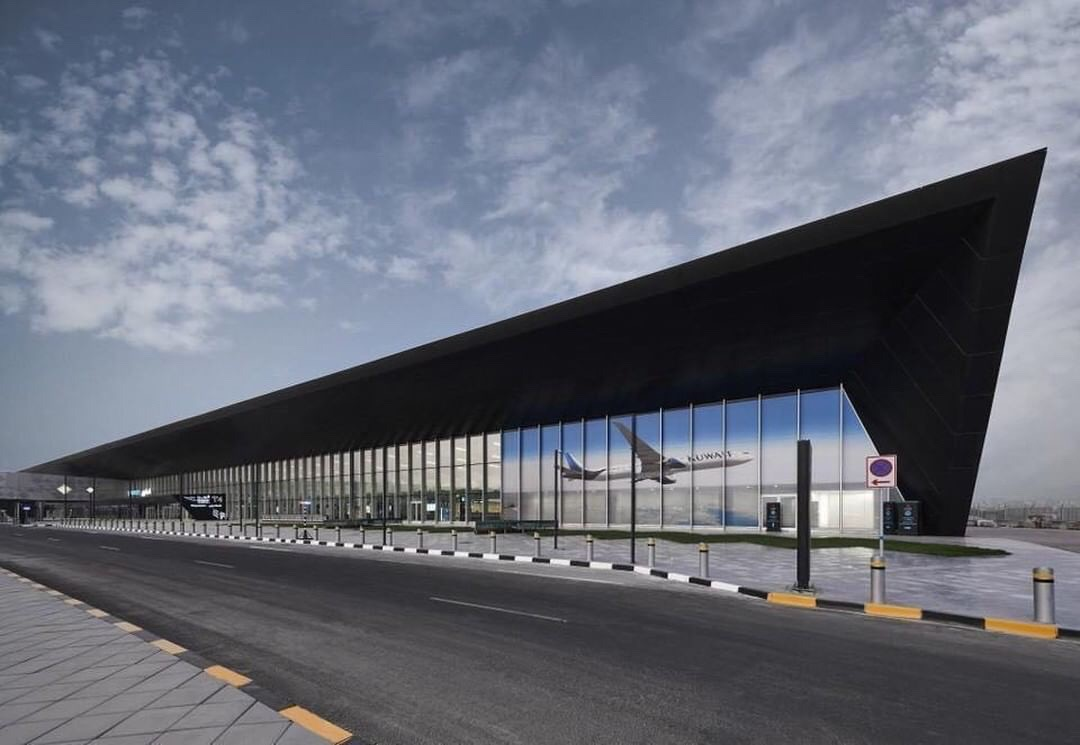
- IATA: KWI; ICAO: OKKK (previously OKBK); WMO: 40582

Summary
- Airport type: Public / military
- Operator: Directorate General of Civil Aviation (Terminal 1); Korea Incheon Airport (Terminal 4)
- Serves: Kuwait City, Kuwait
- Location: Farwaniya Governorate, Kuwait
- Hub for: Kuwait Airways; Jazeera Airways
- Elevation AMSL: 206 ft (63 m)
- Coordinates: 29°13′36″N 047°58′48″E
- Website: kuwaitairport.gov.kw

Maps
- Location of airport in Kuwait KWI/OKKK (Persian Gulf) KWI/OKKK (Middle East) KWI/OKKK (West and Central Asia) KWI/OKKK (Asia)
- Interactive map of Kuwait International Airport

Runways
Direction	Length		Surface
Direction	m	ft	Surface
15R/33L	3,400	11,155	Concrete
15L/33R	3,500	11,483	Asphalt
16/34	4,580	15,026	Asphalt

Statistics (2023)
- Passengers: 15,616,800
- Aircraft movement: 210,010

Kuwait International Airport (Arabic: مطار الكويت الدولي, IATA: KWI, ICAO: OKKK) is an international airport located in the Farwaniya Governorate, Kuwait, 15.5 kilometers (9.6 mi) south of the centre of Kuwait City, spread over an area of 37.7 square kilometres (14.6 sq mi). As of 2025 it is the 12th busiest airport in the Middle East. It serves as the primary hub for Kuwait Airways and Jazeera Airways. A portion of the airport complex is designated as Abdullah Al-Mubarak Air Base, which contains the headquarters of the Kuwait Air Force, as well as the Kuwait Air Force Museum.

== History ==
The airport was first launched in 1927–1928.

Terminal 1, which currently serves all airlines (excluding Kuwait Airways and Jazeera Airways, who are served by Terminal 4 and Terminal 5 respectively), was designed by Japanese architect Kenzo Tange and opened in 1979.

The airport underwent a large renovation and expansion project from 1999 to 2001, in which the former parking lot was cleared, and a terminal expansion was built.

Kuwait International Airport can currently handle more than 13 million passengers a year. A new general aviation terminal was completed in 2008 under a BOT scheme and is operated by Royal Aviation.

In 2011, the Department of Civil Aviation announced the intention of extending Kuwait International Airport so it can handle more passengers and more aircraft. On 3 October 2011, the Directorate General of Civil Aviation announced that a new Foster + Partners designed terminal would begin construction in 2012 and would increase the annual passenger handling amount to 14 million passengers in its first phase, with the option of expanding to 25 million passengers. The airport finalized formalities for the construction of the terminal, which was due to begin construction in 2012 with completion by 2016. It would be built to the south of the current terminal complex with new access routes from the Seventh Ring Road to the south of the airport compound. It is designed as a three-pointed star, with each point extending 600 meters from the star's center. Two airside hotels will form part of the new building.

In December 2012, the Kuwaiti Ministry of Public Works announced that the new terminal at the Kuwait International Airport would be completed by the end of 2016, estimating the cost to be around 900 million Kuwaiti dinar ($3.2 billion). On 20 May 2013, the Director of Operations Management in the General Administration of Civil Aviation, Essam Al-Zamil, announced that some of the flights will be diverted to the Sheikh Saad Terminal instead of Kuwait Airport's main terminal starting in July due to the large number of passengers and the growing number of aircraft attributing to Kuwait Airport being over capacity.

On 22 May 2018, Jazeera Airways launched its own dedicated terminal at Kuwait International Airport, to be called Terminal 5. It is located directly adjacent to and connected to the existing main building, but features dedicated arrival/departure areas, customs, and all supporting functions in order to alleviate congestion at the main building. All Jazeera arrivals will arrive at the new terminal from opening, while departing flights will transition from the current terminal between 22 and 27 May. By 27 May, all departing and arriving Jazeera flights will be handled exclusively at Terminal 5.

=== 2026 Iran war ===
Since 28 February 2026, all flights to and from Kuwait International Airport were suspended following the closure of the Kuwaiti airspace due to the 2026 Iran war. Local carriers like Jazeera Airways have diverted operations to Qaisumah International Airport in Saudi Arabia, located approximately 2.5 hours from Kuwait by road. The airport was hit by suicide drones between Late February and April causing damage to the facility, including the radar installation. There were no casualties from the attacks. Kuwait Airways and Jazeera Airways restarted operations from the airport on 26 April, operating from Terminals 4 and 5. Terminal 1 reopened on 1 June, with some non-Kuwaiti airlines restoring service to the airport. The next day, Iranian drones struck and damaged the building, killing 1, injuring 63 causing severe damage to Terminal 1, leading to operations being shut once again. Terminal 1 later plans to reopen for the Saudi Super Cup.

== Military ==
The airport is home to the Abdullah Al-Mubarak Air Base, which is used by the Kuwait Air Force and has been used by Italian Air Force Boeing KC-767s since October 2014 for the fight against ISIL. The gateway at Abdullah Al-Mubarak Air Base, used by US Air Force and coalition forces, was replaced after over 20 years of operation in 2019 with the opening of Cargo City, located adjacent to a newly built ramp on the airport's western side. Cargo City is operated by the 387th Air Expeditionary Group, with the 5th Expeditionary Air Mobility Squadron providing additional services like maintenance for military and contract flights.

== Facilities ==
The airport lies at an elevation of 204 feet (62 m) above mean sea level. It has three runways: 15R/33L with a concrete surface measuring 3,400 m × 46 m (11,155 ft × 151 ft) and 15L/33R with an asphalt surface measuring 3,500 m × 46 m (11,483 ft × 151 ft).

== Terminals ==
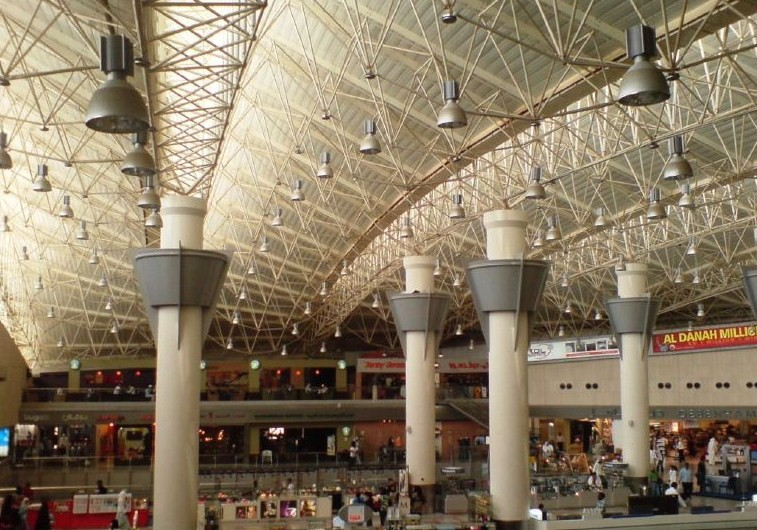
Inside the airport's Terminal 1

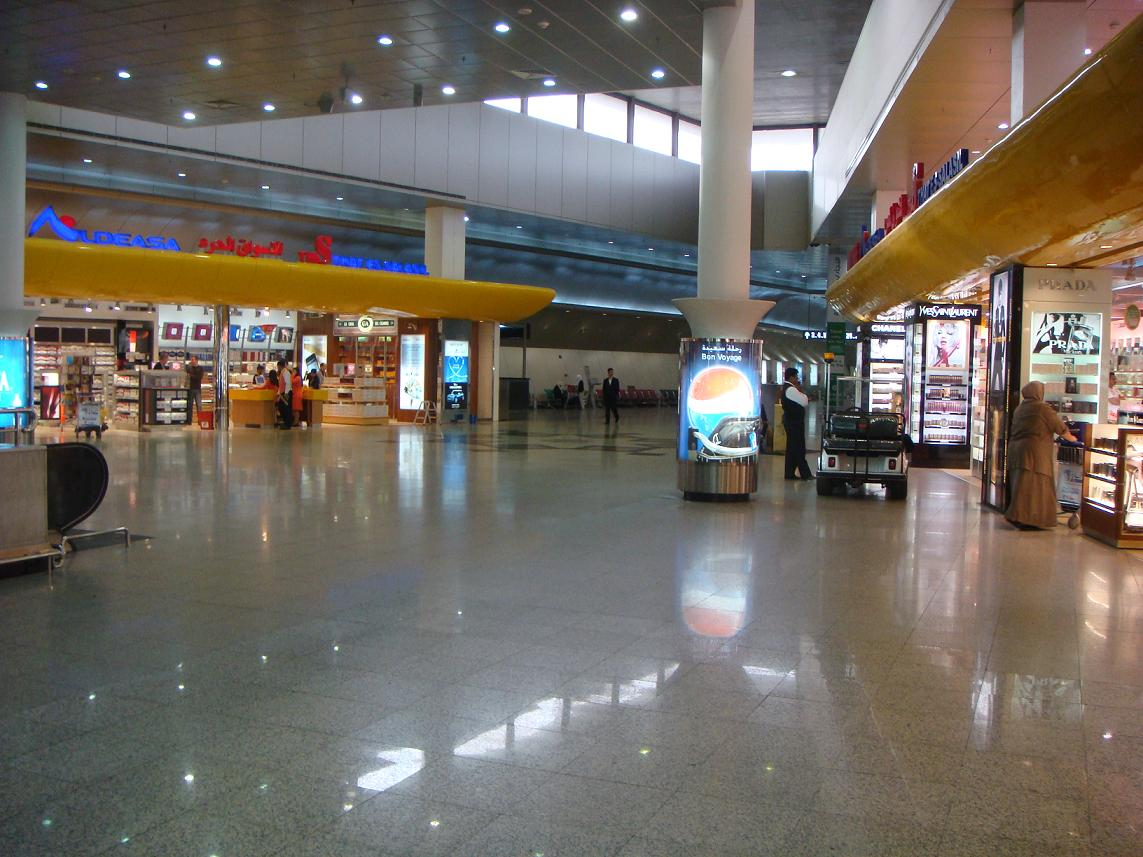
Terminal 1's departures area

Kuwait International Airport is scheduled to have five operational, numbered terminals by 2026.

=== Terminal 2 ===
Terminal 2, designed by Foster and Partners, will expand the airport's overall capacity by 25–50 million passengers per year through the introduction of a triangular building with 28 gates, 4,500 additional parking spaces and a 400-bed air-side hotel. It began construction in May 2017 and was due for completion in August 2022, but was initially delayed to 2024 due to the COVID-19 pandemic. Following further delays, the new target operation date for T2 is set for the last quarter of 2026.

The new terminal is environmentally sustainable, and aims to achieve LEED Gold certification. It is one of the world's largest environment friendly airport projects, and forms an essential part of Kuwait Vision 2035.

The terminal’s construction site was struck by an Iranian drone, causing minor damage to the site but not affecting its planned target operation date.

=== Terminal 4 ===
Inaugurated on 8 August 2018, Terminal 4 at Kuwait International Airport is exclusively used by Kuwait Airways, Kuwait's national carrier. The terminal was designed by the Spanish branch of the American company AECOM and constructed by a joint venture between Cengiz Insaat and First Kuwaiti Contractor. It spans over 55,000 square meters and is located adjacent to the airport's cargo-handling facilities. The terminal features five bus gates and nine boarding bridges, enabling it to accommodate up to eight aircraft simultaneously.

With an annual capacity to handle 4.5 million passengers, Terminal 4 was built to alleviate congestion at Terminal 1 and enhance the overall airport experience. It offers 2,450 parking spaces in a dedicated lot connected to the terminal by a bridge. In addition to these facilities, the terminal is equipped with modern amenities and streamlined operational processes, aimed at providing passengers with a more efficient and comfortable travel experience.

The addition of Terminal 4 marked a significant milestone in the expansion and modernization of Kuwait International Airport, reflecting the country's commitment to improving its aviation infrastructure in line with global standards.

=== Terminal assignments ===
Terminal	Airlines and alliances
Terminal 1	All international airlines arriving in/departing from Kuwait
Terminal 2	Operation planned for November 2026
Terminal 3	General aviation (closed due to ongoing T2 construction)
Terminal 4	Kuwait Airways
Terminal 5	Jazeera Airways

== Airlines and destinations ==
=== Passenger ===
Airlines	Destinations
Air Arabia	Abu Dhabi, Cairo, Sharjah
Air Cairo	Alexandria, Assiut, Cairo, Sohag; Seasonal: Luxor
Air India Express	Bengaluru, Chennai, Goa–Mopa, Kannur, Kochi, Kozhikode, Mangaluru, Mumbai, Tiruchirappalli
Akasa Air	Kochi, Mumbai
ATA Airlines	Ahvaz, Lamerd, Mashhad, Tehran–Imam Khomeini (All flights suspended until further notice)
Biman Bangladesh Airlines	Dhaka
Egyptair	Alexandria, Cairo
Emirates	Dubai–International
Ethiopian Airlines	Addis Ababa
Etihad Airways	Abu Dhabi
Fly Cham	Damascus
Flydubai	Dubai–International
Flynas	Abha
Gulf Air	Bahrain
Himalaya Airlines	Kathmandu
IndiGo	Hyderabad
Iran Air	Ahvaz, Isfahan, Lar, Mashhad, Shiraz (All flights suspended until further notice)
Jazeera Airways	Abha, Abu Dhabi, Addis Ababa, Ahmedabad, Al Ain, Aleppo, Alexandria, Almaty, Amman–Queen Alia, Amman–Civil, Assiut, Aswan, Bahrain, Baku, Bangalore, Batumi, Beirut, Bengaluru, Bergamo, Cairo, Chennai, Chittagong, Colombo–Bandaranaike, Damascus, Delhi, Dhaka, Doha, Dubai–International, Dushanbe, Fergana, Giza, Hafar, Hyderabad, Ha'il, Islamabad, Istanbul, Jeddah, Kathmandu, Karachi, Kochi, Lahore, Luxor, Medina, Moscow–Domodedovo, Mumbai–Shivaji, Riyadh, Sarajevo, Siddharthanagar, Taif, Sohag, Tbilisi, Tehran–Imam Khomeini (Suspended until further notice), Thiruvananthapuram; Seasonal: Antalya, Batumi, Budapest, Hurghada, Kraków, Larnaca, Prague, Rize–Artvin, Salalah, Sochi, Sharm El Sheikh, Tashkent, Tirana, Trabzon, Yerevan (resumes 3 December 2026)
Kam Air	Kabul, Khost
Kuwait Airways	Ahmedabad, Alexandria, Amman–Queen Alia, Amsterdam, Bahrain, Bangkok–Suvarnabhumi, Barcelona, Beirut, Bengaluru, Cairo, Casablanca, Chennai, Colombo–Bandaranaike, Dammam, Delhi, Dhaka, Doha, Dubai–International, Frankfurt, Geneva, Giza, Guangzhou, Hyderabad, Islamabad, Istanbul, Jeddah, Kathmandu, Kochi, Lahore, London–Heathrow, Madrid, Manchester, Medina, Manila, Mashhad (Suspended until further notice), Milan–Malpensa, Moscow–Domodedovo, Mumbai–Shivaji, Munich, Mykonos, New York–JFK, Paris–Charles de Gaulle, Rome–Fiumicino, Sohag, Tbilisi, Thiruvananthapuram, Vienna; Seasonal: Antalya, Bodrum, Luxor, Málaga, Nice, Riyadh, Salalah, Sarajevo, Sharm El Sheikh, Taif, Trabzon, Zürich
Middle East Airlines	Beirut
Nesma Airlines	Cairo
Nile Air	Cairo
Oman Air	Muscat
Pakistan International Airlines	Sialkot
Pegasus Airlines	Seasonal: Trabzon
Qatar Airways	Doha
Royal Jordanian	Amman–Queen Alia
Saudia	Riyadh
Sepehran Airlines	Mashhad (All flights suspended until further notice)
SriLankan Airlines	Colombo–Bandaranaike
Syrian Air	Aleppo, Damascus
Tarco Aviation	Port Sudan
Turkish Airlines	Istanbul
Varesh Airlines	Mashhad (All flights suspended until further notice)
Yemenia	Aden

=== Cargo ===
Airlines	Destinations
Cargolux	Luxembourg
Cargolux Italia	Milan–Malpensa
DHL Aviation	Bahrain
Ethiopian Airlines Cargo	Addis Ababa, Riyadh
Qatar Airways Cargo	Doha
Turkish Cargo	Istanbul

== Statistics ==
Year	Commercial aircraft	Non-commercial aircraft	Passengers	Freight (in metric tonnes)
2015	95,027	7,133	11,163,279	186,039
2016	98,073	6,098	11,762,241	195,515
2017	106,356	5,285	13,735,580	241,663
2018	112,971	5,162	14,813,527	249,531
2019	115,420	6,938	15,448,909	243,442
2023	128,584	7,188	15,616,800	210,010

== Accidents and incidents ==
- On 25 August 1973, a Douglas DC-6 belonging to Yemen Airlines was hijacked during a flight from Taiz to Asmara. After making a refueling stop in Djibouti, the aircraft was taken to Kuwait where the single hijacker surrendered.
- On 17 December 1973, a terrorist attack on Rome's Fiumicino Airport ended with the hijacking of a Lufthansa Boeing 737-100 that was preparing to depart to Munich. The aircraft was taken to Kuwait where the hijackers surrendered one day later.
- On 5 June 1977, a Middle East Airlines Boeing 707 was hijacked during a flight from Beirut to Baghdad. The ordeal ended in Kuwait when the aircraft was stormed and the single hijacker was arrested.
- On 24 July 1980, two hijackers demanding money surrendered after hijacking a Kuwait Airways Boeing 737-200 during a flight from Beirut.
- On 12 December 1983, the airport was one of the targets of the 1983 Kuwait bombings.
- On 2 August 1990, British Airways Flight 149 carrying 349 passengers landed at Kuwait International Airport just four hours after the Iraqi invasion of Kuwait, leading to the capture of the passengers and crew. The Boeing 747-100 aircraft was looted by the Iraqis and destroyed. All passengers and crew were reported safe, but one flight attendant was raped and the passengers were taken to Iraq. A McDonnell Douglas DC-9 belonging to the Kuwait Air Force was also destroyed at the airport. During the Iraqi invasion of Kuwait many of the planes belonging to Kuwait Airways were stolen from the airport and stored in different locations in Iraq, some of the Airbus A310s notably were given Iraqi registrations, the aircraft were later destroyed by allied bombings in 1991.
- On 25 February 1991, a USMC McDonnell Douglas AV-8B Harrier II crash-landed after being hit by ground fire during the Kuwait Liberation War.
- On 27 February 1991, the airport played host to a large tank battle between U.S. and Iraqi forces during the first Gulf War. It is known today as the Battle of Kuwait International Airport.
- On 10 December 1999, three US military personnel died when a USAF Lockheed C-130 Hercules made a hard emergency landing at Kuwait International Airport after sustaining damage from landing short of the runway at nearby Jaber al-Ahmad Airbase.
- On 24 May 2018, a Police Air Wing Eurocopter AS365 Dauphin helicopter was destroyed in a fire that broke out in a military hangar. Another similar helicopter was rescued before the fire reached it.
- On 7 May 2019, a towing tractor driver was killed when a Kuwait Airways Boeing 777-300ER aircraft being towed rolled over the tractor after the tow-bar broke.
- On 8 June 2025, Gulf Air Flight 213 received a bomb threat en route to Kuwait. The plane landed safely and after procedures revealed there was no bomb.
- During the 2026 Iran war, the airport was targeted by Iranian drone attacks, causing damage to Terminal 1. Terminal 2 was also targeted. In the 1st attack, 5 were injured, and the June 3 attacks had 63 injuries and 1 casuality.

== See also ==
- List of the busiest airports in the Middle East
- List of airports with triple takeoff/landing capability
