= No. 2 Squadron RSAF =

- Active: 1970s-present
- Country: Saudi Arabia
- Branch: Royal Saudi Air Force
- Type: Squadron
- Role: Close Air Support
- Part of: RSAF 7 Wing
- Base: King Faisal Air Base (Tabuk)
- Aircraft: McDonnell Douglas F-15C Eagle; McDonnell Douglas F-15D Eagle

No. 2 Squadron RSAF is a squadron of the Royal Saudi Air Force that operates the McDonnell Douglas F-15C Eagle and F-15D Eagle at King Faisal Air Base, Tabuk, Tabuk Province in Saudi Arabia within RSAF 7 Wing.

It used to fly the English Electric Lightning F.53 and T.55 at Tabuk, up until at least 1985.
