= No. 79 Squadron RSAF =

- Active: Unknown-present
- Country: Saudi Arabia
- Branch: Royal Saudi Air Force
- Type: Squadron
- Part of: RSAF 7 Wing
- Base: King Faisal Air Base, Tabuk
- Aircraft: BAE Systems Hawk 165

No. 79 Squadron RSAF is a squadron of the Royal Saudi Air Force that operates the BAE Systems Hawk 165 at King Faisal Air Base, Tabuk, Tabuk Province in Saudi Arabia within RSAF 7 Wing.
