= Midnight Hawks =

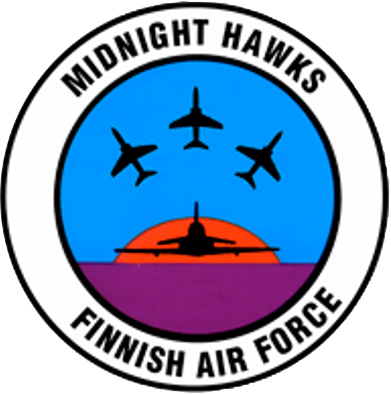
- Midnight Hawks emblem
- Active: 1997~
- Country: Republic of Finland
- Role: Aerobatic Display
- Size: 4
- Garrison/HQ: Tikkakoski AB, Finland

Midnight Hawks is a Finnish aerobatics team. The team is organised by the Finnish Air Force. The aircraft used is the BAe Hawk advanced jet trainer.

== History ==
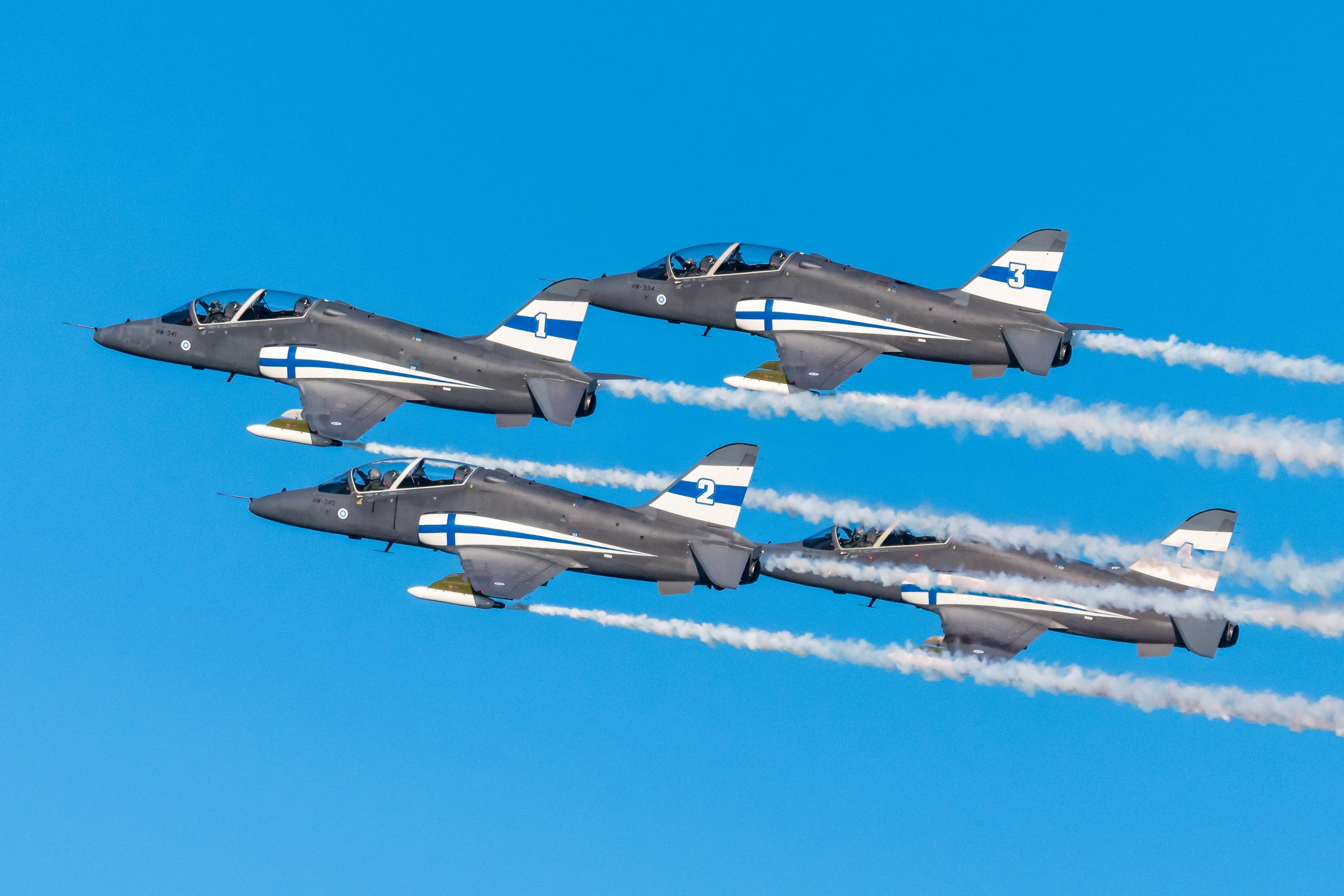
The Midnight Hawks perform with four BAE Hawks

The history of the Midnight Hawks began before World War II, when the Finnish Air Force Academy used Gloster Gamecocks and other aircraft for display flying. The tradition of formation flying continued after the war and it became a trademark of the Finnish Air Force Training Air Wing's annual Midnight Sun Airshow. Midsummer Eve is normally the third Friday in June. Originally the show was just the Training Air Wing's Midsummer party for the families, relatives and the people of the Kauhava village where the academy was located. Over the years this event has grown to become the Midnight Sun Airshow and Festival with many foreign participants and over 20,000 spectators. Because of the midnight sun the airshow starts at around 7 p.m. and lasts until midnight when the last display is flown.

Finnish Air Force Training Air Wing's flight instructors have always performed formation flying in the Midnight Sun Airshow. The formation flying had been part of the normal training syllabus and no special team names or aircraft had been used. There had been several nicknames for the teams, often based on the name of the team leader, but no official team name had been used until 1997. The flight instructors had simply showed their skills and aircraft to the spectators.

The aircraft flown have been Training Air Wing's standard trainer aircraft. Between 1960 and 1980 Saab Safir and Fouga Magister were used, and from the beginning of the 1980s Valmet Vinka and BAe Hawk Mk 51. So for the last forty or so years the Finnish Air Force Training Air Wing has had two formation display teams; one flying with the basic prop trainer, and the second with the jet fighter trainer. Both teams had performed almost solely at the Midnight Sun Airshow once in a summer.

During the 1990s the Finnish Air Force Training Air Wing's jet display team started to expand their appearances, performing in airshows other than just the 'Midnight Sun'. The sight of four BAe Hawks in a tight formation became familiar to thousands of airshow spectators around the country. The jet display team started to operate more and more like an official display team, even though it was still without name or official status. In 1997 this changed. In the biggest ever airshow in Finland, Oulu International Airshow, the Finnish Air Force Training Air Wing's jet display team appeared as the Midnight Hawks. Immediately the name spread around the country and the wider world - the Finnish Air Force Display Team Midnight Hawks had been born.

All the members of the team are flight instructors in the Finnish Air Force Academy, and in active service. They usually hold the rank of Captain or Major.
