= BAE Systems Hawk =

Military training aircraft family

Hawk
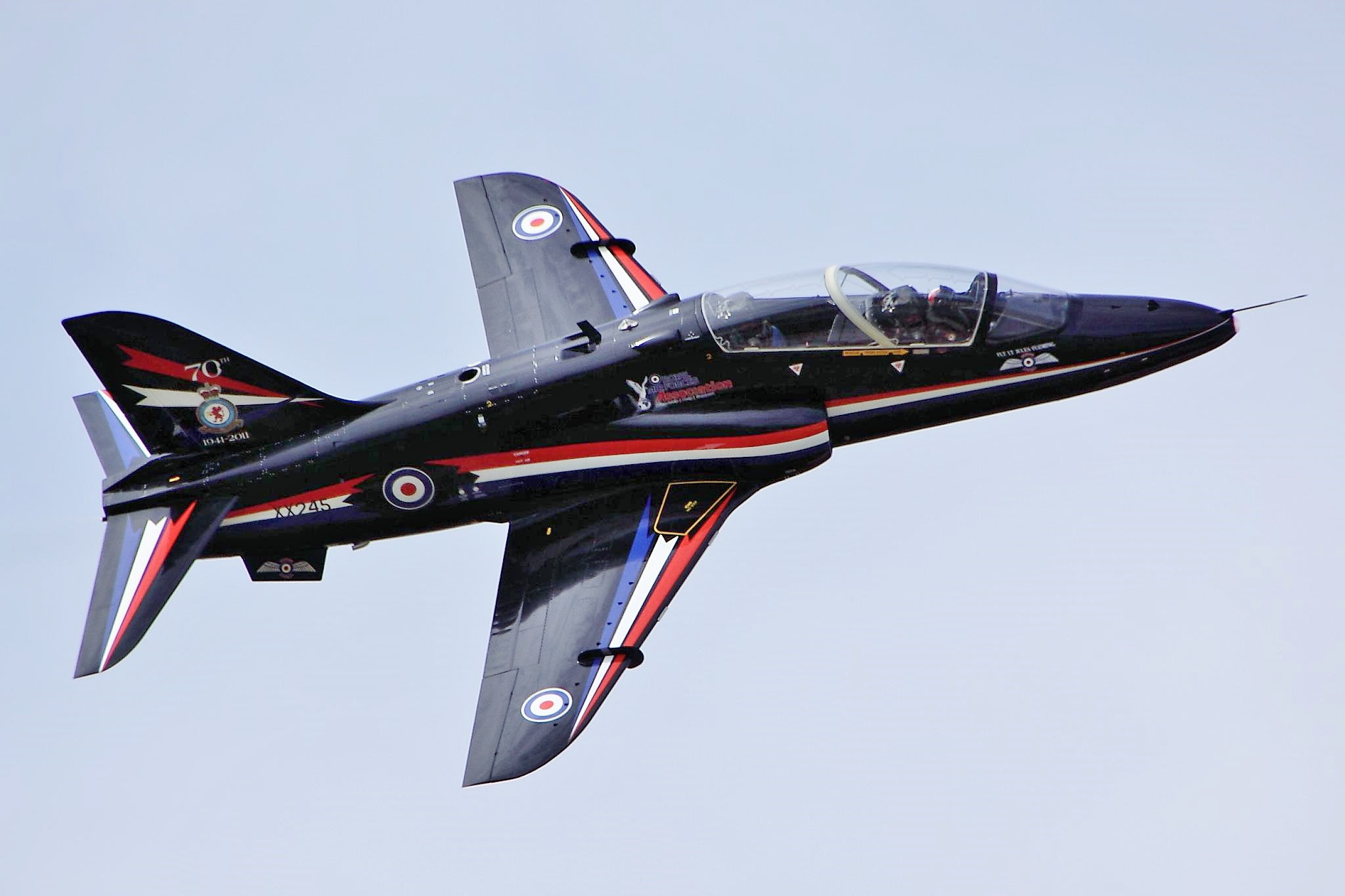
- BAE Hawk T1 trainer of the Royal Air Force

General information
- Type: Advanced trainer aircraft
- National origin: United Kingdom
- Manufacturer: Hawker Siddeley (1974–1977); British Aerospace (1977–1999); BAE Systems MAI division (1999–2022); Hindustan Aeronautics Limited (2008–present)
- Status: In service
- Primary users: Royal Air Force Indian Air Force; Royal Saudi Air Force; Royal Australian Air Force; South African Air Force
- Number built: 1,000+

History
- Manufactured: 1974–present
- Introduction date: 1976
- First flight: 21 August 1974
- Developed into: British Aerospace Hawk 200; McDonnell Douglas T-45 Goshawk

The BAE Systems Hawk is a British single-engine, subsonic, jet-powered advanced trainer aircraft. Its aluminium alloy fuselage is of conventional string-frame construction. It was first known as the Hawker Siddeley Hawk, and subsequently produced by its successor companies, British Aerospace and BAE Systems. It has been used in a training capacity and as a low-cost combat aircraft.

Operators of the Hawk include the Royal Air Force (notably the Red Arrows display team) and several foreign military operators. The Hawk was produced at BAE Brough until 2020 in the UK, and continues to be produced under licence in India by Hindustan Aeronautics Limited (HAL), with over 1000 Hawks sold to 18 operators around the world.

== Development ==
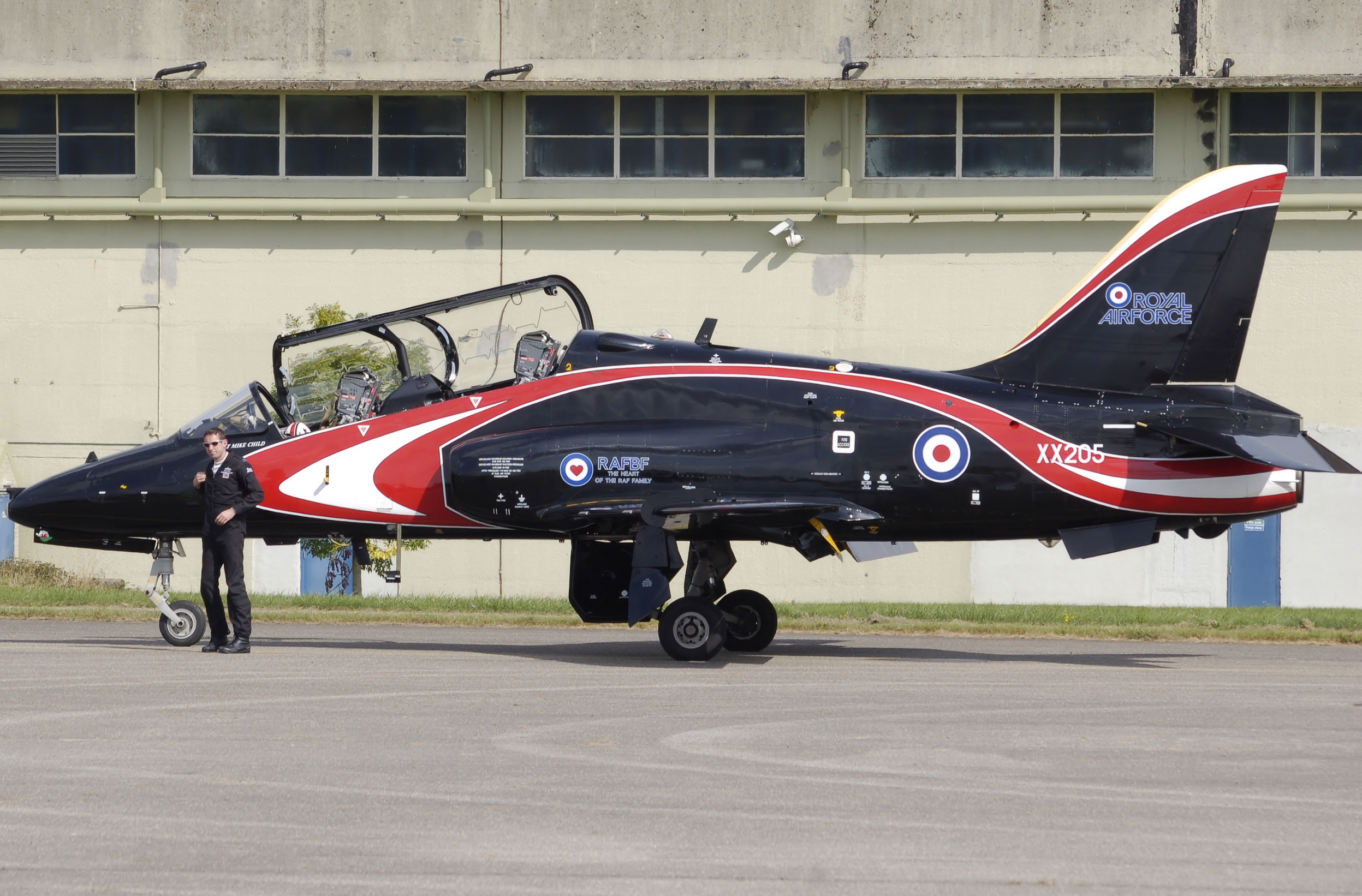
A Royal Air Force Hawk T1A at Kemble Airport, Gloucestershire, with its pilot

=== Origins ===
In 1964, the Royal Air Force specified a requirement (Air Staff Target, AST, 362) for a new fast jet trainer to replace the Folland Gnat. The SEPECAT Jaguar was originally intended for this role, but it was soon realised that it would be too complex an aircraft for fast jet training and only a small number of two-seat versions were purchased. Accordingly, in 1968, Hawker Siddeley Aviation (HSA) began studies for a simpler aircraft, initially as special project (SP) 117. The design team was led by Ralph Hooper.

This project was funded by the company as a private venture, in anticipation of possible RAF interest. The design was conceived of as having tandem seating and a combat capability in addition to training, as it was felt the latter would improve export sales potential. By the end of the year HSA had submitted a proposal to the Ministry of Defence based on the design concept, and in early 1970 the RAF issued Air Staff Target (AST) 397 which formalised the requirement for new trainers of this type. The RAF selected the HS.1182 for their requirement on 1 October 1971 and the principal contract, for 175 aircraft, was signed in March 1972.

The prototype aircraft XX154 first flew on 21 August 1974 from Dunsfold piloted by Duncan Simpson, Chief Test Pilot of HSA (Kingston), reaching 20,000 ft in a flight lasting 53 minutes. All development aircraft were built on production jigs; the program remained on time and to budget throughout. The Hawk T1 entered RAF service in late 1976. The first export Hawk 50 flew on 17 May 1976. This variant had been specifically designed for the dual role of lightweight fighter and advanced trainer; it had a greater weapons capacity than the T.1.

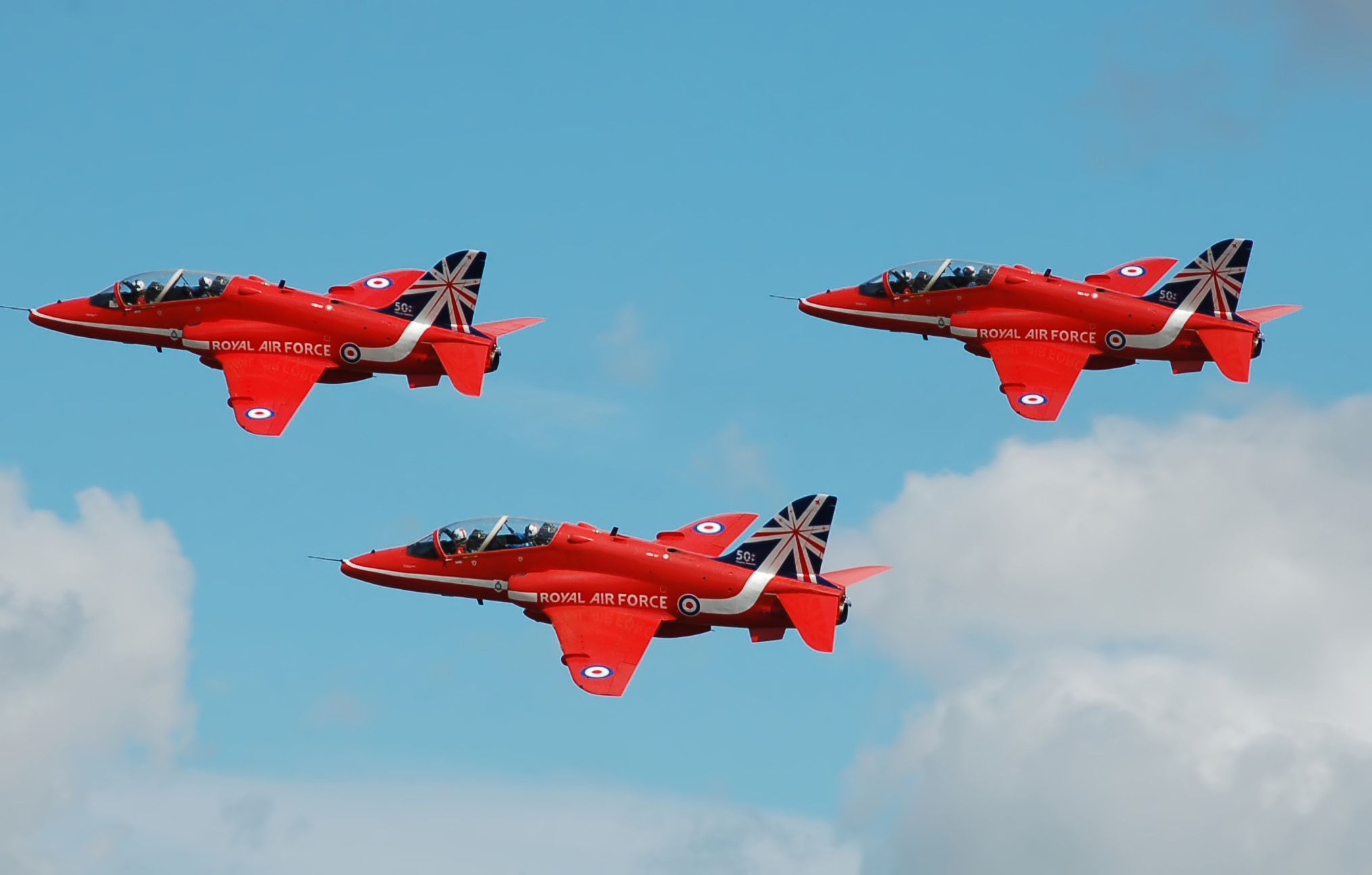
The RAF Red Arrows depart the 2014 Royal International Air Tattoo, England, in a colour scheme that commemorates their 50th year.

More variants of the Hawk followed, and common improvements to the base design typically included increased range, more powerful engines, redesigned wing and undercarriage, the addition of radar and forward-looking infrared, GPS navigation, and night-vision compatibility. Later models were manufactured with a great variety in terms of avionics fittings and system compatibility to suit the individual customer nation; cockpit functionality was often rearranged and programmed to be common to an operator's main fighter fleet to increase the Hawk's training value.

In 1981, a derivative of the Hawk was selected by the United States Navy as their new trainer aircraft. Designated the McDonnell Douglas T-45 Goshawk, the design was adapted to naval service and strengthened to withstand operating directly from the decks of carriers, in addition to typical land-based duties. This T-45 entered service in 1994; initial aircraft had analogue cockpits, while later deliveries featured a digital glass cockpit. All airframes were planned to undergo avionics upgrades to a common standard.

=== Further development ===
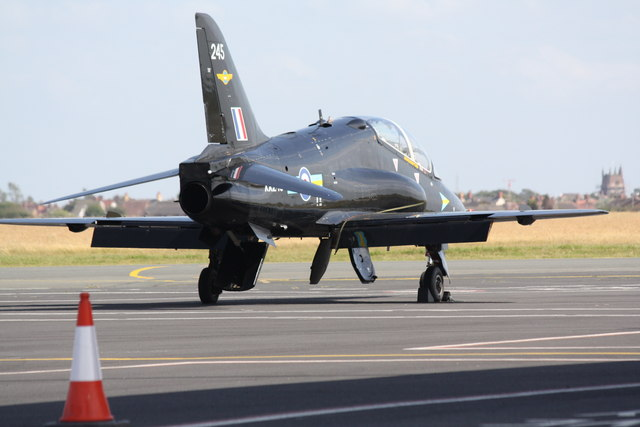
RAF Hawk at Blackpool Airport, 2008

A major competitor to the Hawk for export sales has been the Dassault/Dornier Alpha Jet; aviation expert John W. R. Taylor commented: "What Europe must avoid is the kind of wasteful competition that has the Hawker Siddeley Hawk and Dassault-Breguet/Dornier Alpha Jet battling against each other in the world market." By early 1998, a total of 734 Hawks had been sold, more than 550 of which had been sold to export customers. Military customers often procured the Hawk as a replacement for older aircraft such as the BAC Strikemaster, Hawker Hunter, and Douglas A-4 Skyhawk.

During the 1980s and 1990s, British Aerospace, the successor company to Hawker Siddeley, was trying to gain export sales of the variable-wing Panavia Tornado strike aircraft; however, countries such as Thailand and Indonesia, which had shown initial interest in the Tornado, concluded that the Hawk is a more suitable and preferable aircraft for their requirements. Malaysia and Oman cancelled their arranged Tornado orders in the early 1990s, both choosing to procure the Hawk, instead. Aviation authors Norman Polmar and Dana Bell stated of the Hawk: "Of the many similar designs competing for a share of the world market, the Hawk has been without equal in performance as well as sales".

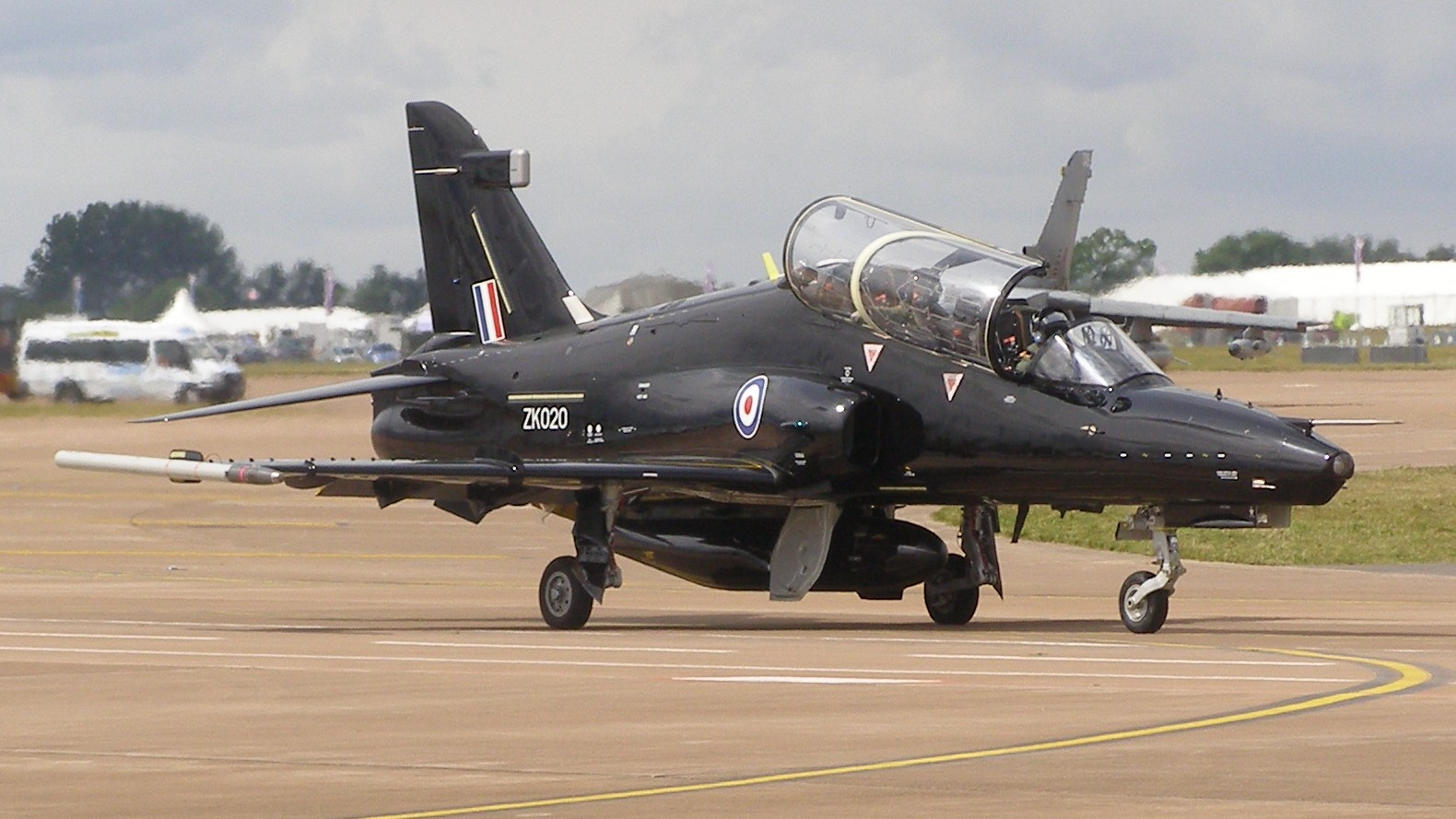
A Hawk T2 of the Royal Air Force in 2009

On 22 December 2004, the Ministry of Defence awarded a contract to BAE Systems to develop an advanced model of the Hawk for the RAF and Royal Navy. The Hawk Mk. 128, otherwise designated as Hawk T2, replaces conventional instrumentation with a glass cockpit, to better resemble modern fighter aircraft such as the new mainstay of the RAF, the Eurofighter Typhoon. In October 2006, a £450 million contract was signed for the production of 28 Hawk 128s. The aircraft's maiden flight occurred on 27 July 2005 from BAE Systems' Warton Aerodrome.

According to BAE Systems, as of July 2012, they had sold nearly 1000 Hawks, with sales continuing. In July 2012, Australian Defence Minister Stephen Smith confirmed that Australia's fleet of Hawk Mk 127s would be upgraded to a similar configuration to the RAF's Hawk T2 as part of a major mid-life upgrade. The Hawk T2 was considered to be a competitor for the United States Air Force's T-X program to acquire a new trainer fleet, but in February 2015, Northrop Grumman determined the Hawk's shortfalls made it ill-suited for the program requirements and dropped it as their offering.

In May 2015, Indian aerospace manufacturer Hindustan Aeronautics (HAL) revealed that it was examining the prospects of performing its own Hawk upgrades, including armed light attack variants. The Indian Air Force, which were in the process of receiving trainer Hawks built under licence by HAL, were reportedly interested in the upgrade proposals, which would also include avionics and cockpit modifications; HAL has stated that it also aims to export combat Hawks to other countries in partnership with BAE. Missile developer and manufacturer MBDA may provide their ASRAAM and Brimstone missiles to arm the new attack type.

== Design ==
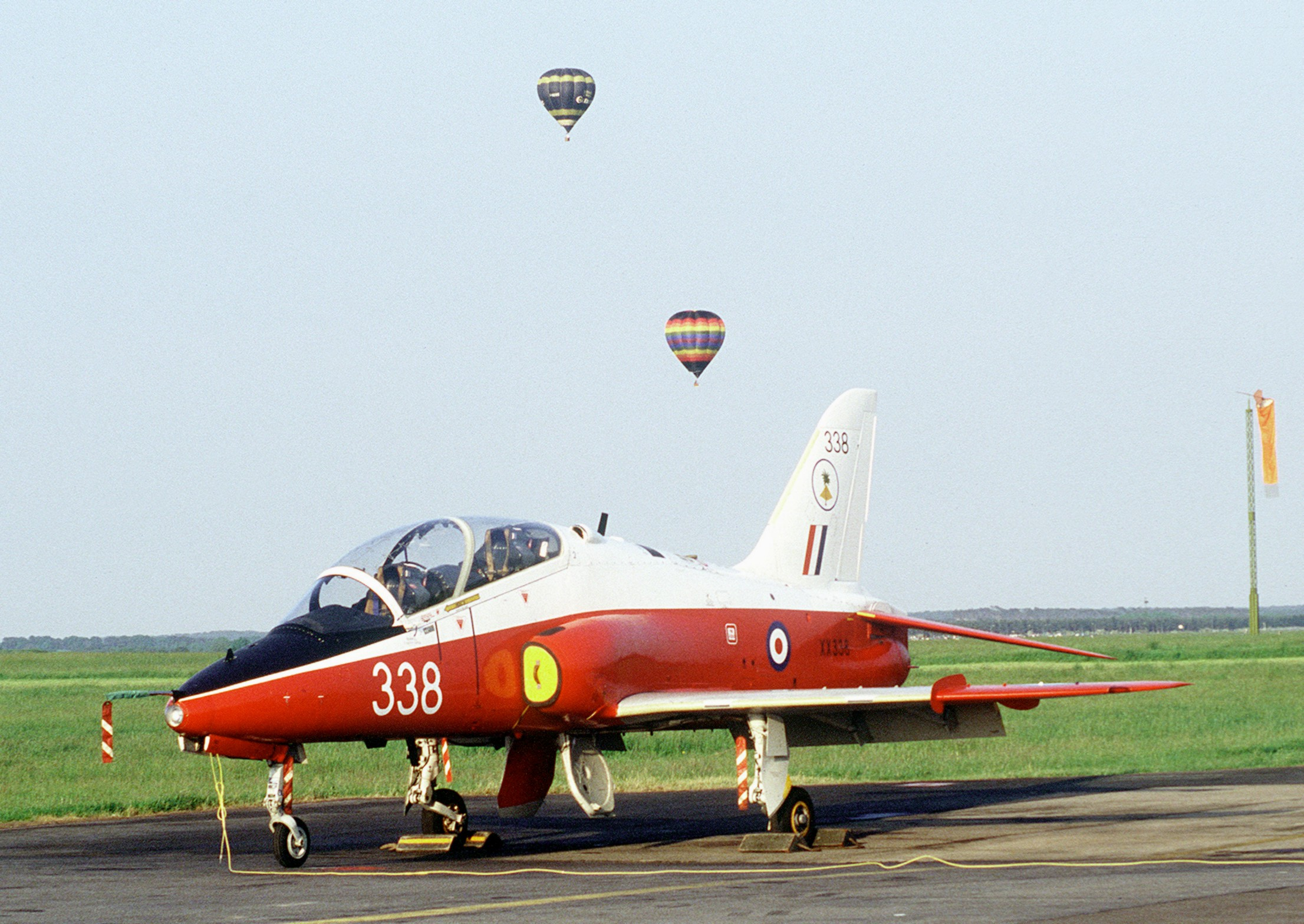
T1 Hawk at RAF Mildenhall, Suffolk, 1984

The Hawk is an advanced 2-seat trainer with a tandem cockpit, a low-mounted cantilever wing and is powered by a single turbofan engine. The design team was led by Ralph Hooper. Unlike many of the previous trainers in RAF service, the Hawk was specifically designed for training. Hawker had developed the aircraft to have a high level of serviceability, as well as lower purchasing and operating costs than previous trainers like the Jet Provost. The Hawk has been praised by pilots for its agility, in particular its roll and turn handling.

The design of the fuselage included a height differential between the two seats of the cockpit; this provided generous levels of visibility for the instructor in the rear seat. Each cockpit is fitted with a Martin-Baker Mk 10B zero-zero rocket-assisted ejection seat. Air is fed to the aircraft's rear-mounted Rolls-Royce Turbomeca Adour engine via intakes on each of the forward wing roots. During the aircraft's development, Hawker had worked closely with Rolls-Royce to reduce the engine's fuel consumption and to ensure a high level of reliability.

Even within the development stages, a Hawk variant was intended to also serve as a single-seat ground-attack fighter; both the trainer and fighter models were developed with the export market in mind. On single seat models, the forward cockpit area which normally houses a pilot is replaced by an electronics bay for avionics and onboard systems, including a fire control computer, multi-mode radar, laser rangefinder and forward-looking infrared (FLIR). Some export customers, such as Malaysia, have extensive modifications to their aircraft, including the addition of wingtip hardpoint stations and a fittable inflight refuelling probe.

SAAF Hawk landing

The Hawk was designed to be manoeuvrable and can reach Mach 0.88 in level flight and Mach 1.15 in a dive, thus allowing trainees to experience transonic flight before advancing to a supersonic trainer. The airframe is very durable and strong, stressed for +9 g; the normal limit in RAF service is +7.5/-4 g. A dual hydraulic system supplies power to operate systems such as the aircraft's flaps, airbrakes and landing gear, together with the flight controls. A ram air turbine is fitted in front of the single tail fin to provide backup hydraulic power for the flight controls in the event of an engine failure; additionally, a gas turbine auxiliary power unit is housed directly above the engine.

The Hawk is designed to carry a centreline gun pod, such as the 30 mm ADEN cannon, two under-wing pylons, and up to four hardpoints for fitting armaments and equipment. In RAF service, Hawks have been equipped to operate the Sidewinder air-to-air missiles. In the early 1990s, British Aerospace investigated the possibility of arming the Hawk with the Sea Eagle anti-ship missile for export customers. In 2016, BAE Systems was developing the so-called 'Advanced Hawk' with a new wing using leading-edge slats, and potentially additional sensors and weapons, a head-mounted display, and a single large-screen display in the forward cockpit.

== Operational history ==
=== United Kingdom ===
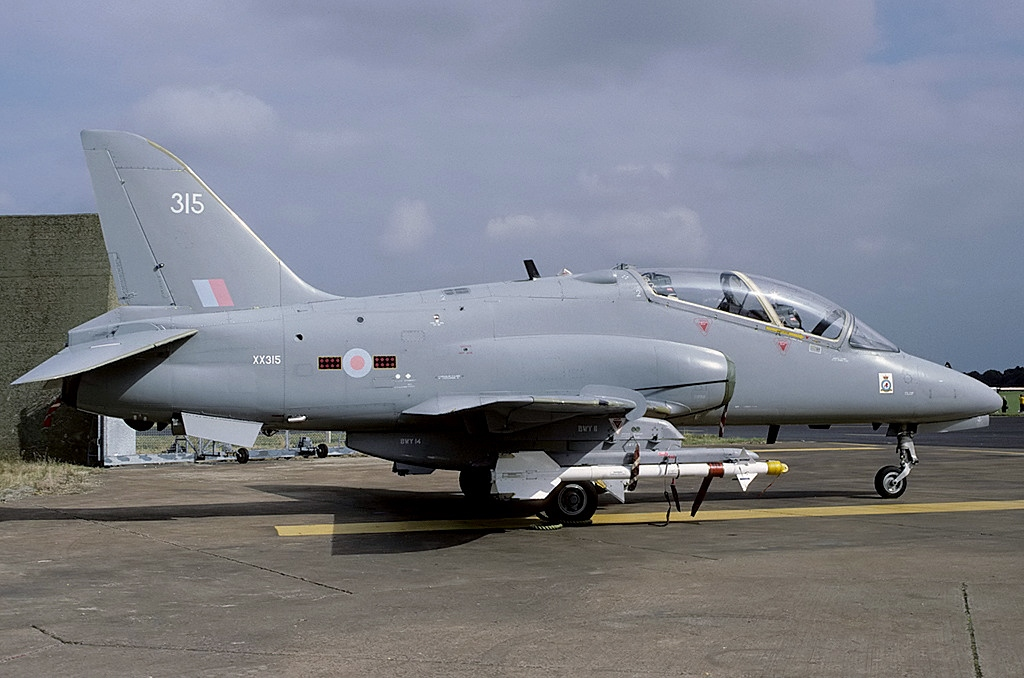
Hawk T.1A of 234 Squadron, armed with a pair of AIM-9L Sidewinder missiles and a 30mm gun pod

The Hawk entered RAF service in April 1976, replacing the Folland Gnat and Hawker Hunter for advanced training and weapons training. The Hawk T1 was the original version used by the RAF, deliveries commencing in November 1976. The most famous users of the Hawk are the Red Arrows aerobatic team, who adopted the plane in 1979.

From 1983 to 1986, some Hawks were equipped as short-range interceptor aircraft. 88 T1s were modified to carry two AIM-9L Sidewinder air-to-air missiles in addition to a 30 mm ADEN cannon gun pod; these aircraft were redesignated as Hawk T1A. In a wartime scenario, they would have worked in collaboration with the RAF's Tornado F3 interceptors, which would use their Foxhunter search radars and more sophisticated navigation systems to vector the Hawks against enemy targets.

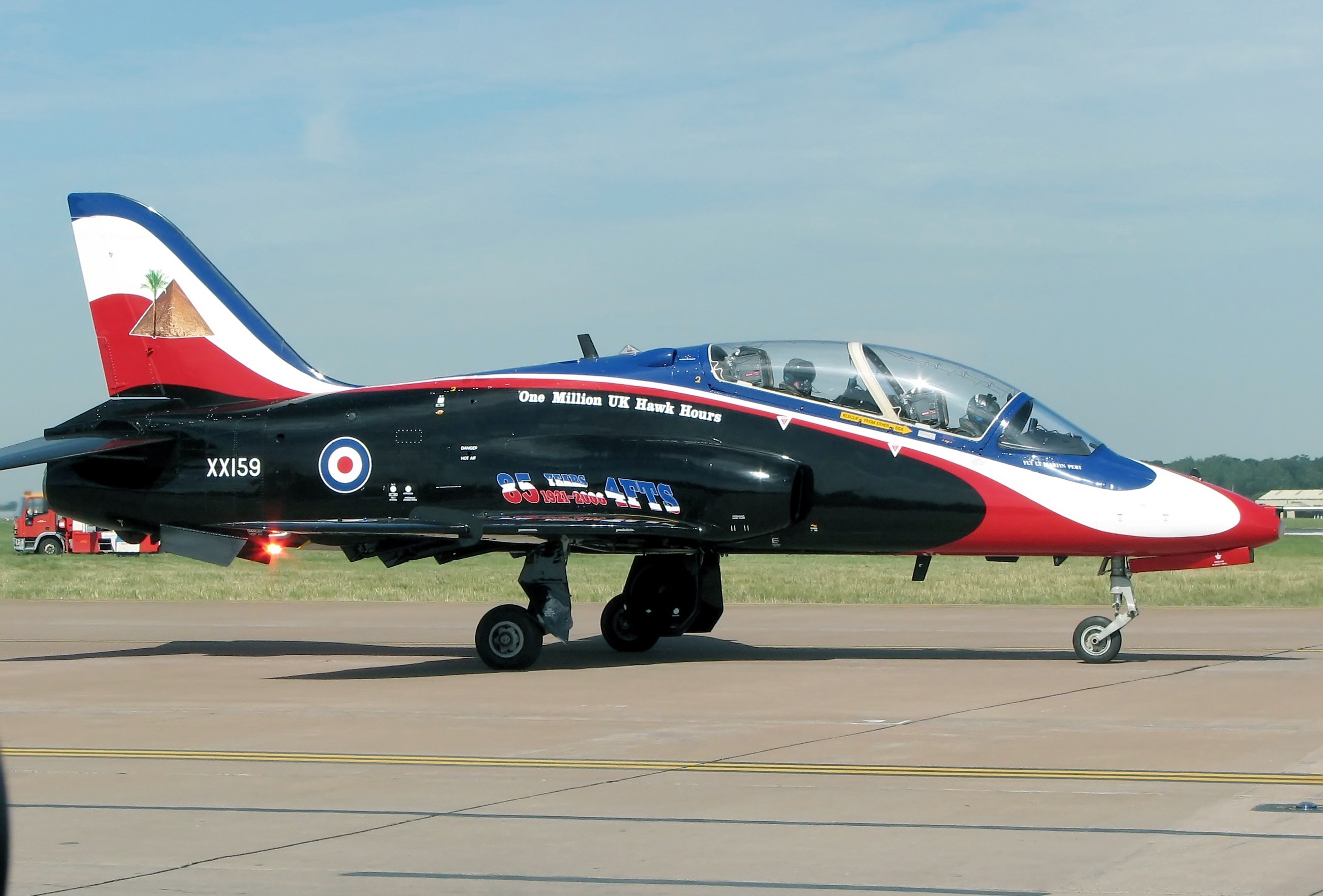
RAF Hawk T1A, marking the 85th anniversary of No. 4 Flying Training School

The Hawk subsequently replaced the English Electric Canberra for target towing duties. The Royal Navy acquired a dozen Hawk T1/1As from the RAF; these are typically operated in a support role, often to conduct simulated combat training on board ships.

During the 1990s and 2000s, 80 Hawk T1/1A aircraft were upgraded under the Fuselage Replacement Programme (FRP) to extend their operational lifespan; sections of the centre and rear fuselage sections were entirely replaced. In 2009, the RAF began receiving the first Hawk T2, in the long term, T2 aircraft will replace the ageing T1s. Training operations on the Hawk T2 began in April 2012.

In August 2011, a Red Arrows pilot was killed when his Hawk T1 crashed following a display at the Bournemouth Air Festival; the inquest found "G-force impairment" may have caused the pilot to lose control. The Hawk T1 fleet was grounded as a precautionary measure and returned to flight status a few days later.

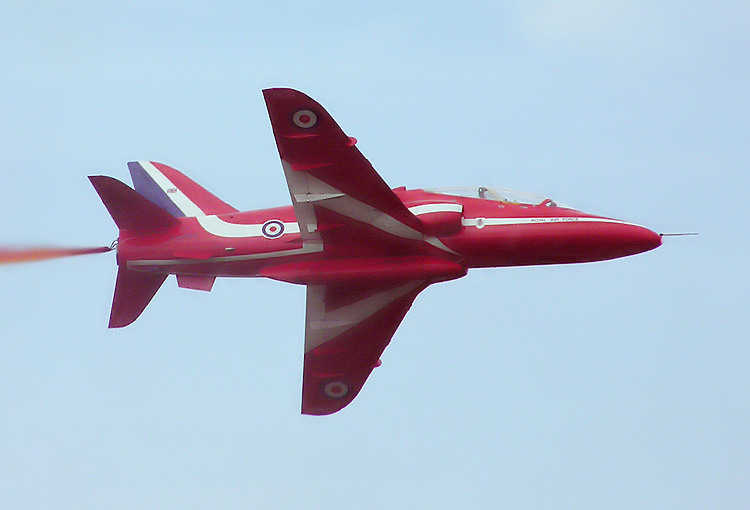
Royal Air Force Aerobatic Team "Red Arrows" Hawk T1

In November 2011, the Red Arrows suffered another pilot fatality when the Martin-Baker Mk.10 ejection seat fitted to the Hawk T1 activated while the aircraft was stationary; the veteran combat pilot died on ground impact when the ejector seat parachute also failed to deploy. This resulted in the UK Ministry of Defence implementing a ban on non-essential flying in aircraft fitted with ejector seats similar to those fitted in the Hawk T1 after the death. The ban was lifted for Tornado attack jets but remained on Hawk T1, Hawk T2 and Tucano flights while the RAF reviewed evidence on those aircraft.

In October 2017, the RAF and Royal Navy operated 75 Hawk T1 and 28 Hawk T2. According to the Ministry of Defence, the planned out-of-service date for the Hawk T1 was 2030, with the aircraft selected to meet the requirements of the Air Support to Defence Operational Training (ASDOT) programme beginning to replace the Hawk from 2027. However, in July 2021, it was announced that all UK military units operating the Hawk T1 aircraft, apart from the Red Arrows, would see their airframes retired by 31 March 2022.

=== Canada ===
In Canada, the Hawk – designated as the CT-155 Hawk – was used to train pilots for front-line fighter aircraft. The aircraft was operated under the NATO Flying Training in Canada (NFTC) program, which was provided by the Military Aviation Training division of Bombardier Aerospace but transferred to CAE by acquisition in 2015. NFTC operated 17 CT-155s from CFB Moose Jaw. It was responsible also for "the multinational fighter lead-in training program" at 419 Tactical Fighter Training Squadron in CFB Cold Lake.

All CT-155 were retired in March 2024 without a replacement.

=== Finland ===
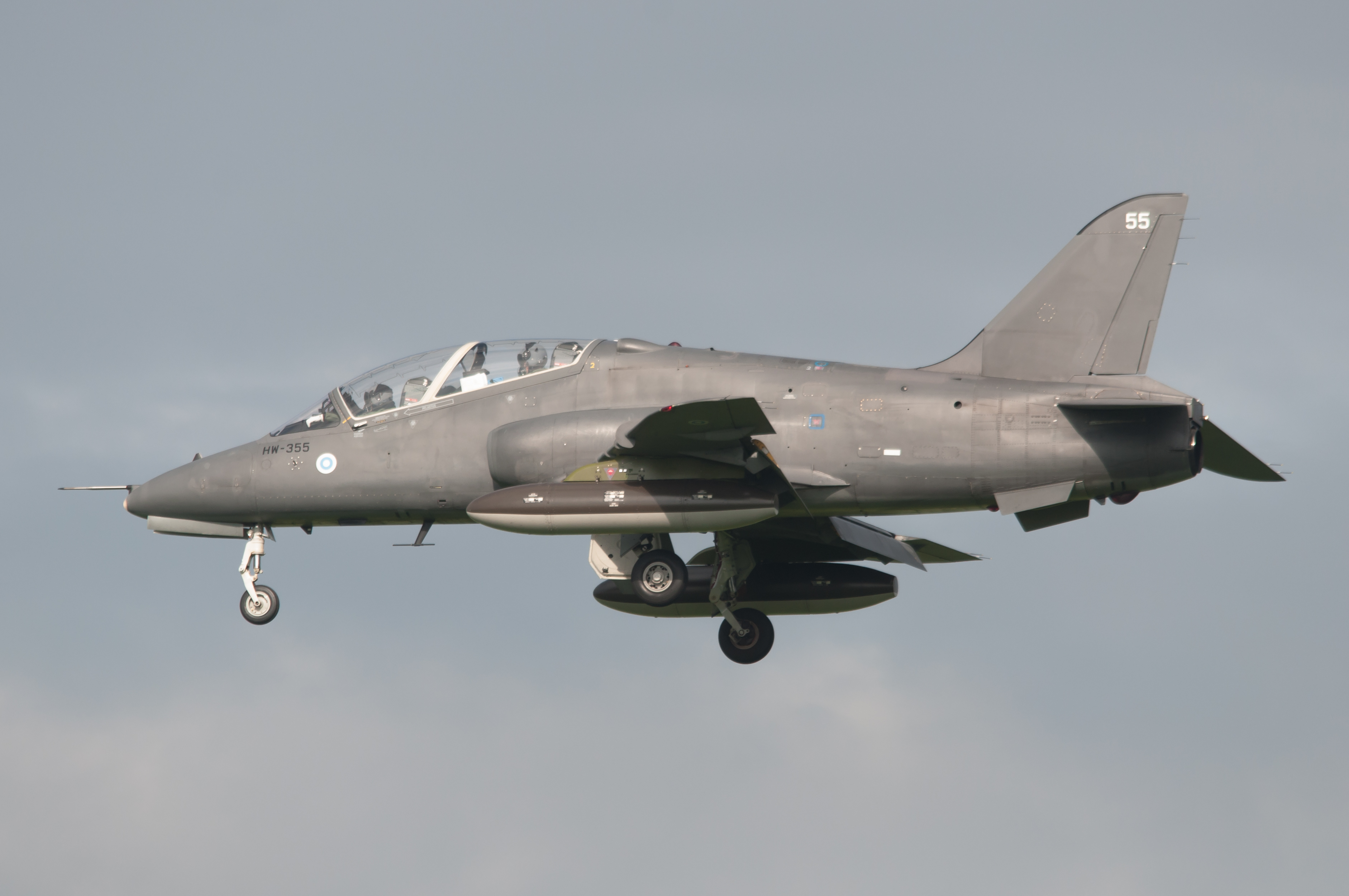
Finnish Hawk in flight, 2011

In January 1978, Britain and Finland announced a deal in which the Finnish Air Force was to receive 50 Hawk Mk. 51s in 1980; these aircraft were built in Finland under licence by Valmet. The Finnish Air Force was limited to 60 first-line fighter aircraft by the Paris Peace Treaty of 1947; by acquiring Hawks, which counted as trainers rather than fighters, capacity could be increased while continuing treaty compliance. These conditions were nullified during the 1990s by the break-up of the Soviet Union.

Seven additional Mk. 51As were delivered in 1993–94 to make up for losses. In June 2007, Finland arranged to purchase 18 used Hawk Mk. 66s from the Swiss Air Force for 41 million euros; they were delivered in 2009–2010. Finnish Hawks have reportedly been armed with Soviet Molniya R-60/AA-8 as well as with AIM-9J and AIM-9M air-to-air missiles, Matra Type 155 SNEB rocket pods, unspecified British general-purpose bombs of multiple types, VKT 12.7 mm machine gun pods and Royal Small Arms Factory 30 mm ADEN autocannon pods. The Finnish Air Force aerobatics team, the Midnight Hawks, also uses the aircraft.

Due to rising levels of metal fatigue, a major structural reinforcement program was carried out to extend the operational life of Finland's Hawks during the 1990s. Due to lifespan limitations, 41 out of 67 in Finland's total Hawk fleet were taken out of service between 2012 and 2016; the remaining aircraft are younger and thus are expected to be flying into the 2030s. In 2011, Finnish Mk. 51s and Mk. 66s underwent a series of upgrades performed by Patria, these included the adoption of a new Cockpit 4000 glass cockpit, new software, and other life-extending modifications. This upgrade program was completed in 2013.

=== India ===
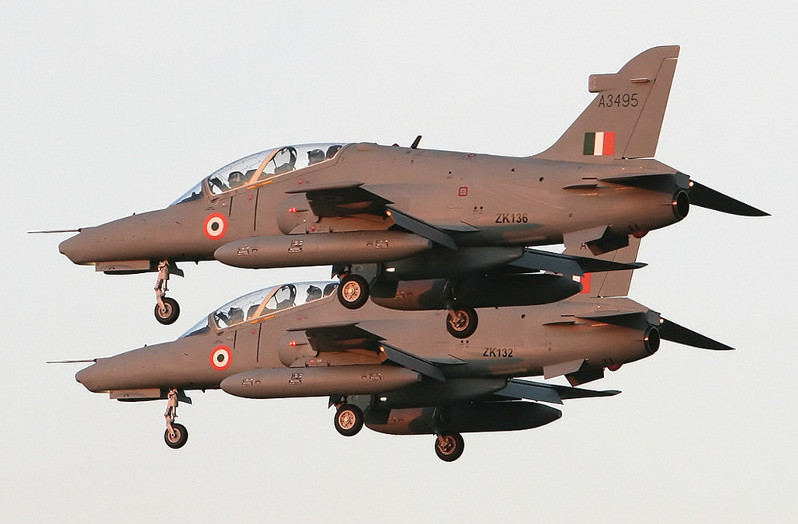
Two BAE Systems Hawks of the Indian Air Force

On 23 February 2008, the Hawk Mk. 132 formally entered service with the Indian Air Force (IAF), after one of the most protracted procurements in India's history, two decades having elapsed between the initial interest and the contract signing on 26 March 2004. The IAF received 24 aircraft directly from BAE Systems with deliveries beginning in November 2007, and further 42 Hawks assembled by Hindustan Aeronautics Limited between 2008 and 2011. In February 2008, India planned to order 57 more Hawks, with 40 going to the Indian Air Force and the remaining 17 to the Indian Navy.

In July 2010, it was announced that the IAF and the Navy would receive the additional 57 aircraft. The additional aircraft will be all built in India by Hindustan Aeronautics (HAL), continuing to work under licence from BAE. On 10 February 2011, Hindustan Aeronautics Limited and GE Aviation signed a contract under which GE Aviation will conduct the next 30 years of maintenance on the Hawk fleet. In 2011, the IAF was reportedly unhappy with the provision of spare components; In December 2011, BAE received a contract to provide India with spares and ground support.

The Hawk fleet is based at IAF's Bidar Air Force Station in north Karnataka, about 700 km from Bangalore. As of 2015, a total of 123 aircraft were on order by the Indian Air Force and 17 by the Indian Navy, with an additional order of 20 aircraft were under negotiation.

There has been two instances of a Hawk AJT crash — 29 April 2008 at Bidar AFS, Karnataka and 3 June 2015 near Baharagora, close to the West Bengal – Odisha border.

=== Indonesia ===
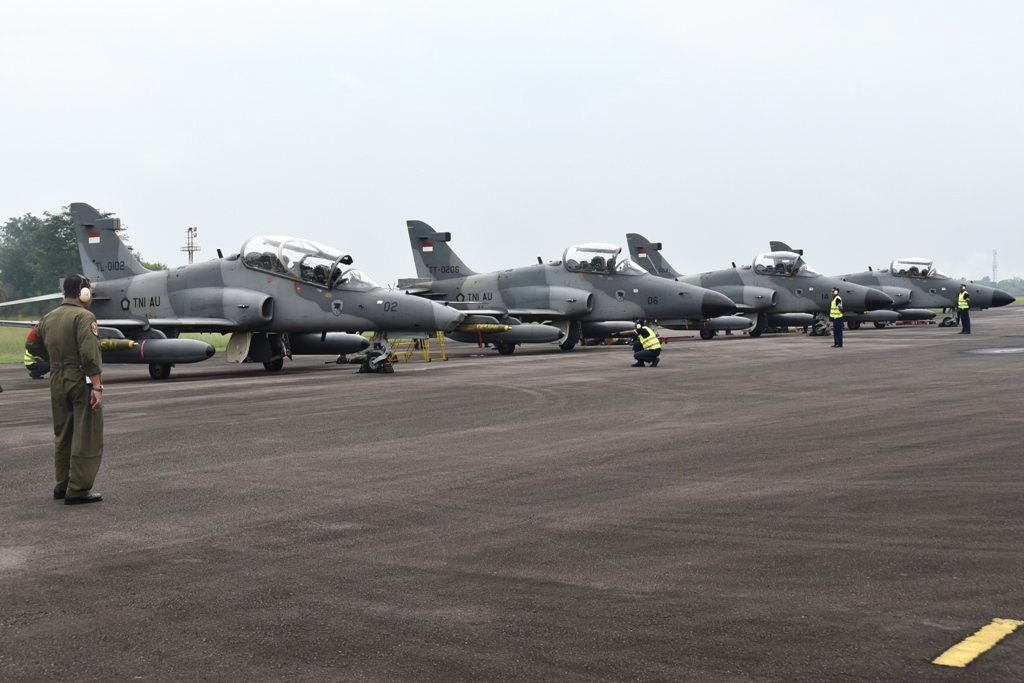
A Hawk 109 and three Hawk 209s of the 12th Air Squadron of Indonesian Air Force

In April 1978, Indonesia, seeking to increase its aerial capabilities, placed the first of multiple orders for the Hawk. The Indonesian Air Force received more than 40 Hawks in the 1980s and 1990s; In June 1991, BAe and Indonesian Aerospace (IPTN) signed a major agreement for collaborative production of the Hawk, and more orders of the Hawk were anticipated. Further Hawk exports were eventually blocked due to concerns over Indonesian human rights, particularly in East Timor. During the 1990s protests erupted across England over arming Indonesia and pressure increased after the mass-murder of the Balibo Five journalists and Roger East came to light and allegations of the use of Hawks during the Indonesian occupation of East Timor.

The Hawks have been the backbone of Indonesian Air Force, supplementing more advanced and expensive aircraft such as the F-16 Fighting Falcon. In September 2013, the Indonesian Air Force began receiving the KAI T-50 Golden Eagle, which has been reported as having been set to eventually replace the Hawk in service. In February 2016, it was announced that Indonesia's Hawk fleet was set to receive a new radar warning receiver self-defense system, aiding the type's use in light attack operations.

A BAE Hawk in use with the Indonesian Air Force crashed on 15 June 2020.

=== Malaysia ===
The Royal Malaysian Air Force has 18 Hawk aircraft, consisting of 4 Hawk 108 export versions as training aircraft and 14 Hawk 208 as combat aircraft. On 5 March 2013, during the 2013 Lahad Datu standoff, five Hawk 208 together with three American-made Boeing F/A-18D Hornets were employed in airstrikes on hideouts of the terrorist group Royal Security Forces of the Sultanate of Sulu and North Borneo in Lahad Datu, Sabah ahead of the ground assault by joint forces of the Malaysian Army and Royal Malaysian Police.

=== Saudi Arabia ===
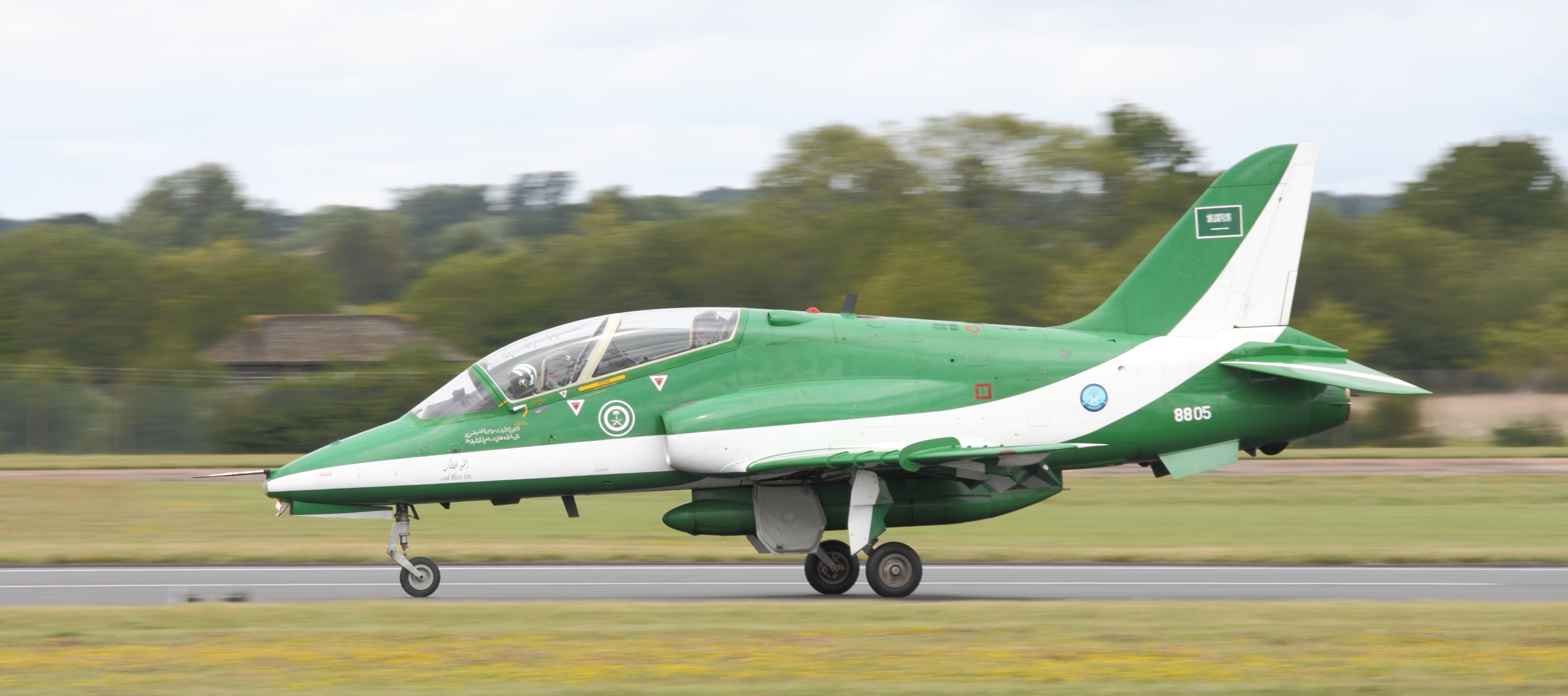
Royal Saudi Air Force Hawk in 2011

Saudi Arabia acquired the Hawk under the Al-Yamamah arms deal with Britain, with a total of 50 Hawk Mk. 65/65As ordered in contracts placed in 1985 and 1994 respectively. In August 2012, a deal for 22 Hawk 'Advanced Jet Trainers' worth approximately $800 million was announced. The AJTs would replace older models of Hawks in the Royal Saudi Air Force (RSAF) inventory. The Hawk is flown by the RSAF demonstration team. In February 2016 it emerged that Saudi Arabia had doubled the number of Hawk AJT aircraft it had ordered from BAE Systems, with an order for a further 22. This was revealed in the company's preliminary annual report for 2015; "We reached agreement with the Saudi customer for the provision of a further 22 Hawk AJT aircraft, associated ground equipment, and training aids for the RSAF which form part of an enhancement to the Kingdom's training capacity." Once in service, the Hawk AJTs will complete the replacement of the earlier Mk 65 and Mk 65A platforms. 22 of these Hawks are to be assembled locally in Saudi Arabia, the first of which was completed in March 2019.

=== Zimbabwe ===
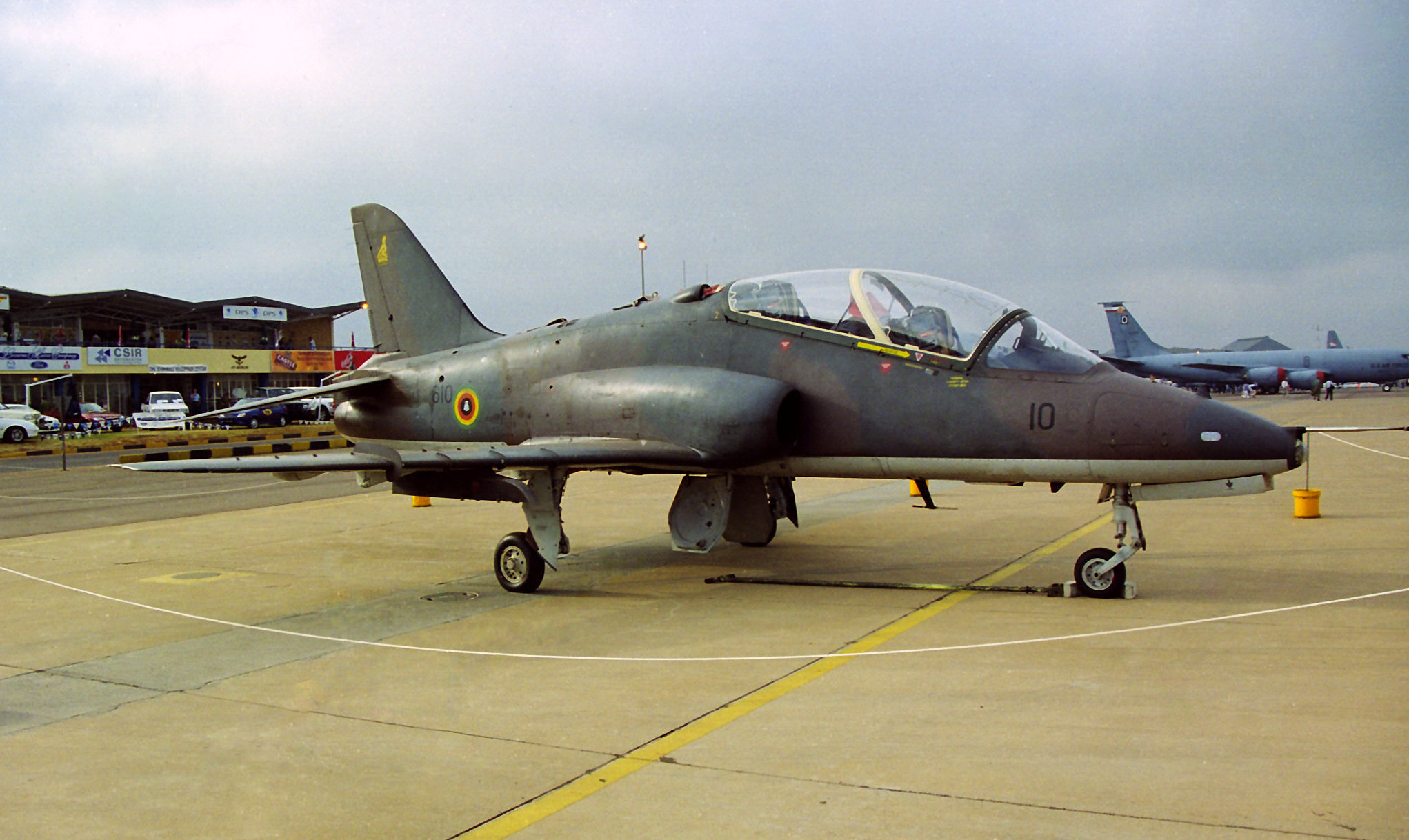
An AFZ Hawk T60A in 2000

In the 1980s, 12 BAE Hawk T.Mk. 60/60As were purchased for the Air Force of Zimbabwe (AFZ); the purchase was supported by a £35 million loan from the UK to Zimbabwe. The Hawk deal also included the transfer of a number of used Hawker Hunters. In July 1982, at least one Hawk was destroyed on the ground and three more heavily damaged during a dissident attack on Thornhill air base, Gweru.

Zimbabwe's Hawks were used during the Second Congo War. Numerous airstrikes were conducted in support of the Congolese Army against Rwandan, Ugandan and rebel forces in 1998–2000. Alongside other aircraft, AFZ Hawks played a significant role in the defence of Kinshasa during the early days of the war. In 2000, the controversy over Zimbabwe's military intervention in the Congo and poor human rights record led to Britain imposing a total arms embargo on the nation, including spare parts for the Hawk. Due to the embargo, Zimbabwe has purchased six Chinese Hongdu K-8s as a substitute.

An unknown number of Zimbabwe's Hawks were restored to service in 2022; Zimbabwean military officials declined to comment on the details of their refurbishment.

=== Others ===
During the 1980s, a prospective sale of 63 Hawk trainers to Iraq was considered by the British government. While the proposal had its proponents, it was controversial as in a ground-attack capacity Iraq might have employed the Hawk against neighbouring Iran and to oppress Iraq's own Kurdish population; there was also concern that the Hawk could be potentially armed with chemical weapons. After considerable deliberation the sale was blocked by then Foreign Secretary John Major. In 2010, Iraq entered talks with BAE for an order of up to 21 Hawks.

In 1993, talks between BAe and South Africa's Denel Aviation began regarding a replacement for the South African Air Force (SAAF)'s ageing Atlas Impala fleet. By 2004, Denel had begun construction of Hawks under licence from BAe; components for other customers have also been produced by Denel. On 13 January 2005, the first locally assembled Hawk conducted its first flight; it belonged to a batch of 24 trainers ordered by the SAAF.

== Variants ==
=== Hawk T1 ===
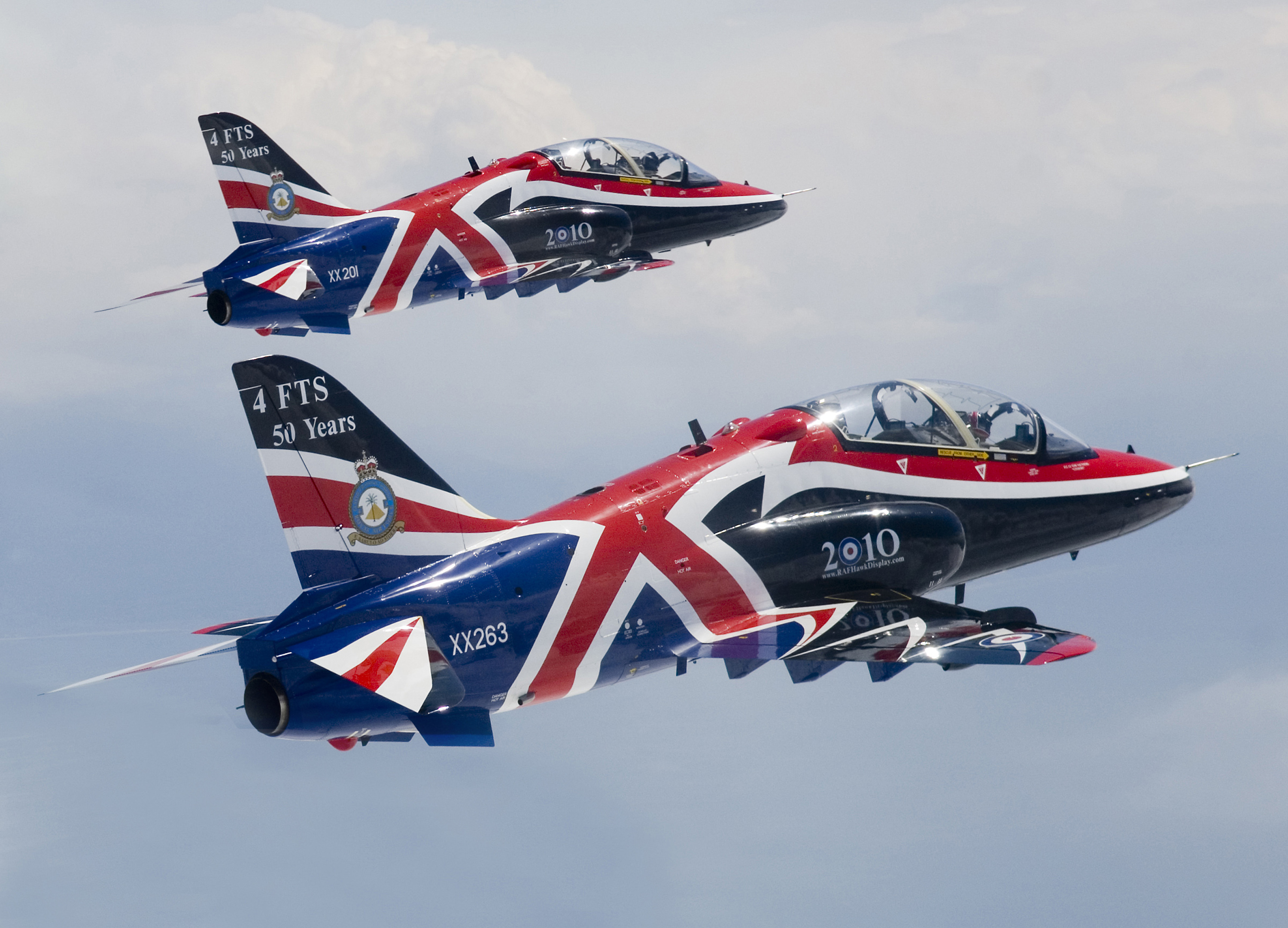
Two Hawk T1s of RAF 208 Squadron in the 2010 display season livery

The Hawker Siddeley Hawk T1 (Trainer Mark 1) was the original version of the Hawk used by the RAF, deliveries commencing in November 1976. The RAF received a total of 175 T1s.

=== Hawk T1A ===
The British Aerospace Hawk T1A is a modified Hawk T1, intended to replace the Hawker Hunter in the RAF's Tactical Weapons Units. A total of 89 aircraft were converted to carry two underwing AIM-9L Sidewinder air-to-air missiles and a centreline Aden gun pod. This is also the variant used by the RAF's Red Arrows display team; the underbody gun pod is replaced by a fairing used to carry diesel fuel and dye for the display smoke system.

=== Hawk 50 ===
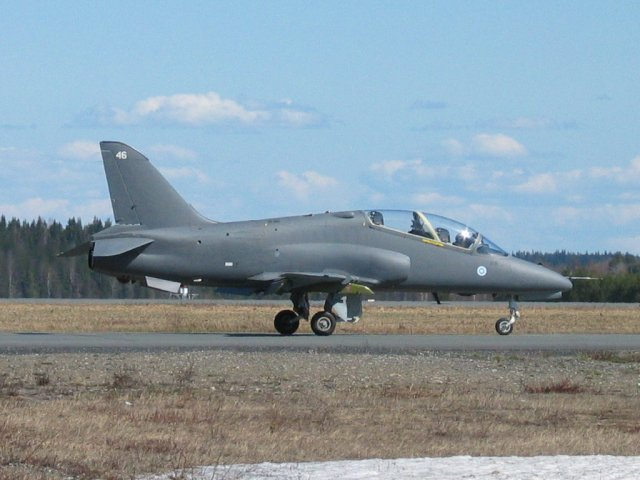
Finnish Air Force Hawk 51 in Rissala AB

The Hawk 50 was the original export trainer version, and offered a limited attack capability. Finland, Indonesia and Kenya ordered 90 of this variant.

- Hawk 51 – Export version for the Finnish Air Force. 50 ordered December 1977, with first four to be built by British Aerospace and remaining aircraft assembled in Finland. Delivered December 1980 to September 1985.
- Hawk 51A – Seven Hawks were sold to Finland as part of a follow-on order. Powered by Adour 851 engine as used by Hawk 51, but with structural and wing modifications of later Hawks.
- Hawk 52 – Export version for the Kenyan Air Force. Fitted with braking parachute. Twelve ordered 9 February 1978, with deliveries from 1980 to 1981.
- Hawk 53 – Export version for the Indonesian Air Force. Eight ordered 4 April 1978, with five more ordered in May 1981, a further three in October 1981 and four in November 1982, giving a total of 20 delivered between 1980 and 1984. Five repurchased by BAE Systems in 1999.

=== Hawk 60 ===
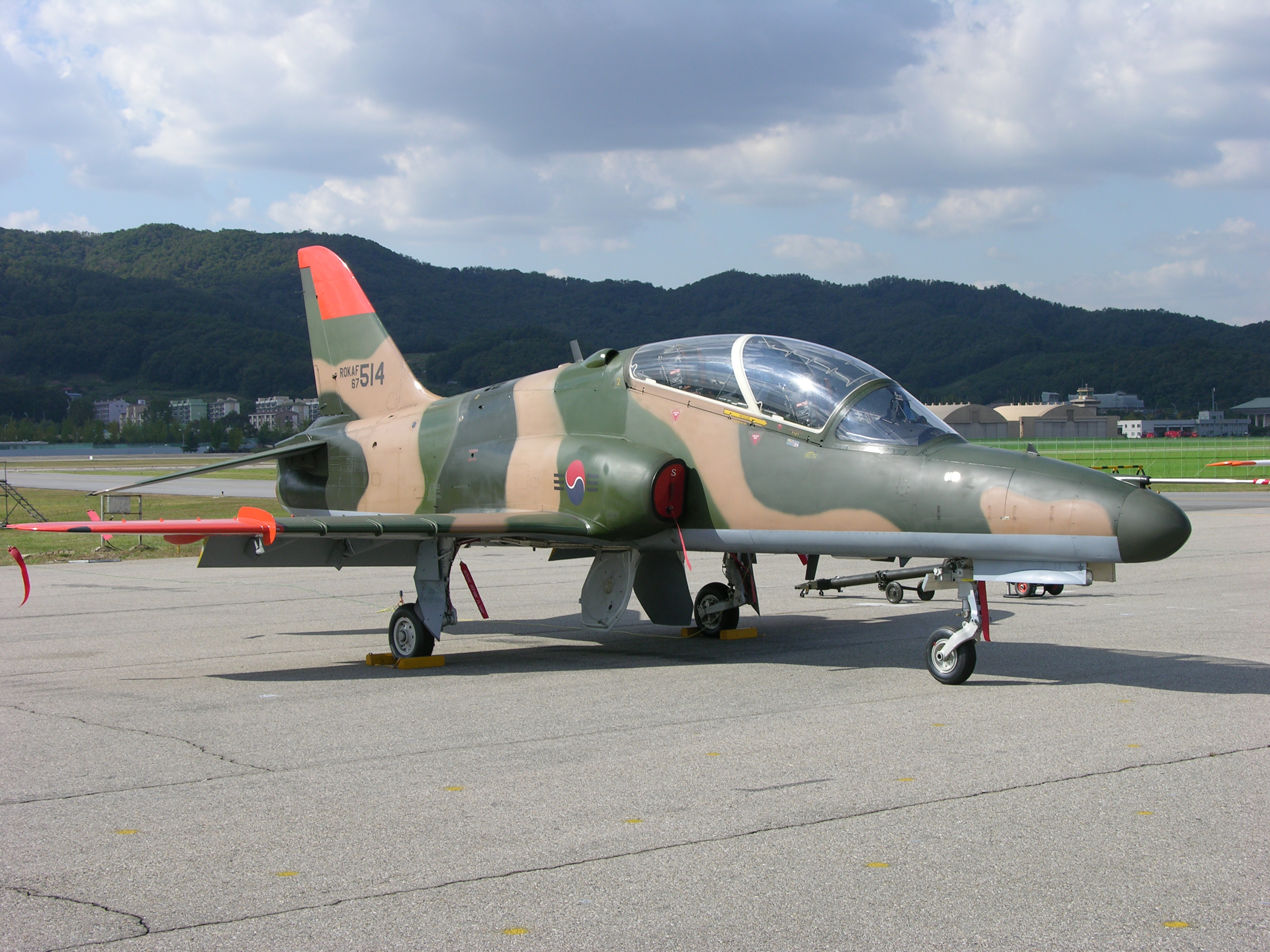
A South Korean Hawk 67 in 2005

Another export version, replacing the Hawk 50, intended for conversion and weapons training. Weapons carriage is increased. It is a two-seater, has uprated Rolls-Royce Adour 861 engines, and is capable of a level speed at altitude of 555 knots (1028 km/h) or Mach 0.84. The T-45 Goshawk was derived from this version.

- Hawk 60 – Export version for the Air Force of Zimbabwe. Fitted with braking parachute and provision for carrying a reconnaissance pod. Eight Hawks were ordered by Zimbabwe on 9 January 1981, and delivered between July and October 1982.
- Hawk 60A – Five Hawks were sold to Zimbabwe as part of a follow-on order in 1990. The aircraft were delivered between June and September 1992.
- Hawk 61 – Export version for Dubai, United Arab Emirates Air Force. Eight ordered 30 June 1981 for a price of $40 million and delivered March to September 1983. Single additional attrition replacement aircraft delivered 1988.
- Hawk 62 – Export version for Venezuela, order cancelled
- Hawk 63 – Export version for Abu Dhabi, United Arab Emirates Air Force. 16 purchased on 2 January 1983 for $180 million including spares and maintenance support. Delivery between October 1984 and May 1985.
- Hawk 63A – 15 Hawk 63s were upgraded to this standard from October 1991, with the Adour 871 engine and Advanced Combat Wing of the Hawk 100, with four underwing weapons pylons and wingtip missile rails, but retaining simpler avionics of Hawk 63.
- Hawk 63C – Four new build aircraft to Hawk 63A standard were sold to Abu Dhabi as part of a follow-on order and delivered from 1995.
- Hawk 64 – Export version for the Kuwait Air Force. Twelve ordered 31 October 1983 and delivered 1985 to 1986.
- Hawk 65 – Export version for the Royal Saudi Air Force. 30 ordered as part of Al Yamamah I arms deal in February 1986 with deliveries from August 1987 to October 1988.
- Hawk 65A – 20 were sold to Saudi Arabia as part of a follow-on order, to an improved standard, and delivered 1997.
- Hawk 66 – Export version for the Swiss Air Force. Twenty ordered on 20 October 1987, with first built by BAe and remaining 19 assembled by the Federal Aircraft Factory at Emmen. Delivery from November 1989 to October 1991.
- Hawk 67 – Export version for the Republic of Korea Air Force. Fitted with extended nose of Hawk 100 to accommodate avionics and a steerable nosewheel. Twenty ordered in July 1991, with delivery by November 1993.

=== Hawk 100 ===
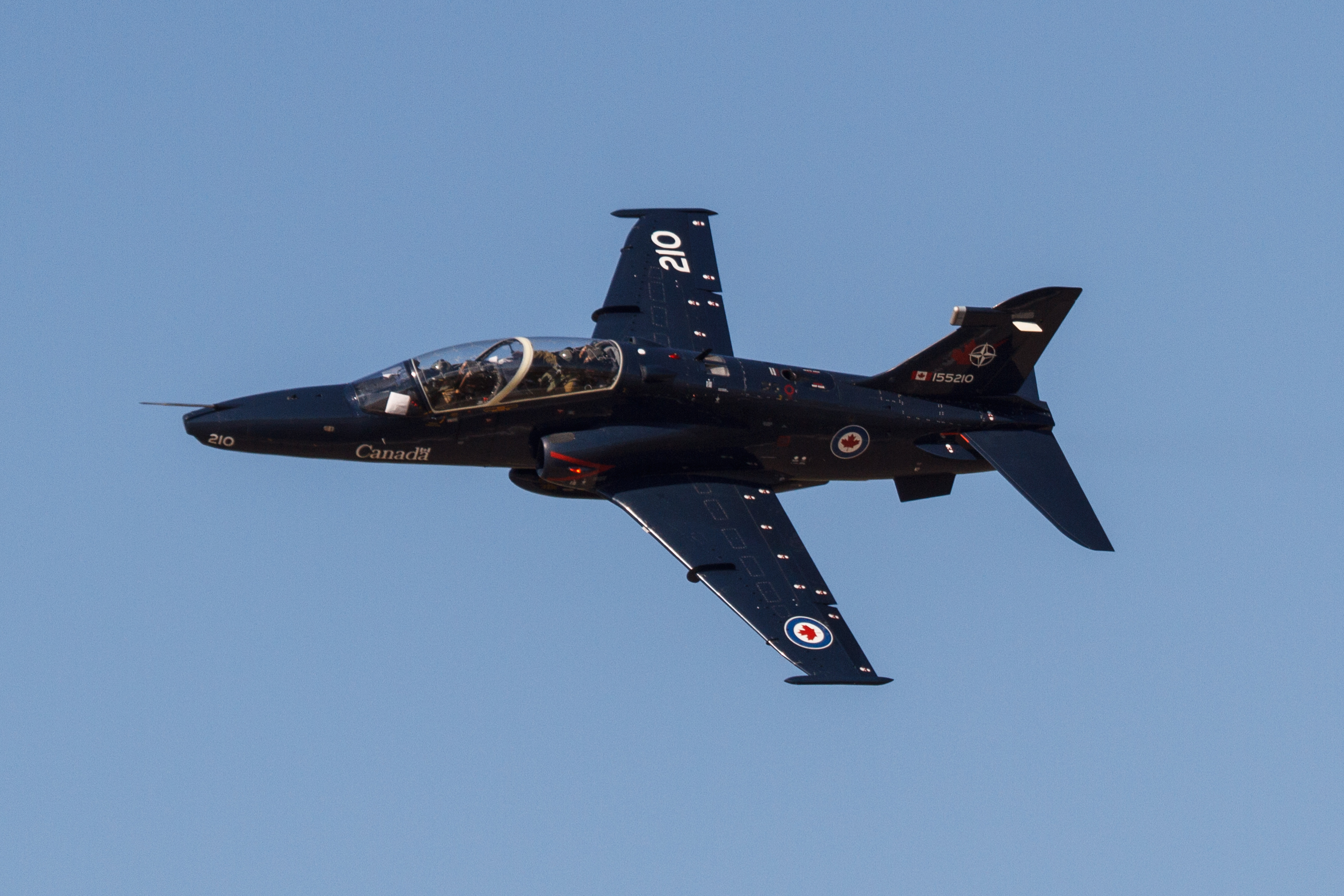
A Hawk 115 (CT-155) of the Royal Canadian Air Force

A two-seat advanced weapons trainer with additional avionics, an optional forward-looking infrared camera, a redesigned wing and hands-on stick-and-throttle controls.

- Hawk 102 – Export version for Abu Dhabi, United Arab Emirates Air Force. Fitted with wingtip missile rails and Racal Prophet radar warning receiver (RWR). Eighteen ordered in 1989 and delivered between April 1993 and March 1994.
- Hawk 103 – Lead-in fighter trainer for the Royal Air Force of Oman. Fitted with FLIR and laser ranger in extended nose, BAE Sky Guardian RWR and wingtip AAM rails. Four were ordered on 30 July 1990 and delivered from December 1993 to January 1994.
- Hawk 108 – Export version for the Royal Malaysian Air Force. Fitted with BAE Sky Guardian RWR and wing tip AAM rails. Ten ordered December 1990, and delivered January 1994 to September 1995.
- Hawk 109 – Export version for the Indonesian Air Force. (8)
- Hawk 115 – Export version for the Canadian Forces, designated CT-155 Hawk in Canadian service.
- Hawk 129 – Export version for Royal Bahraini Air Force. (6)

=== Hawk 120/LIFT ===
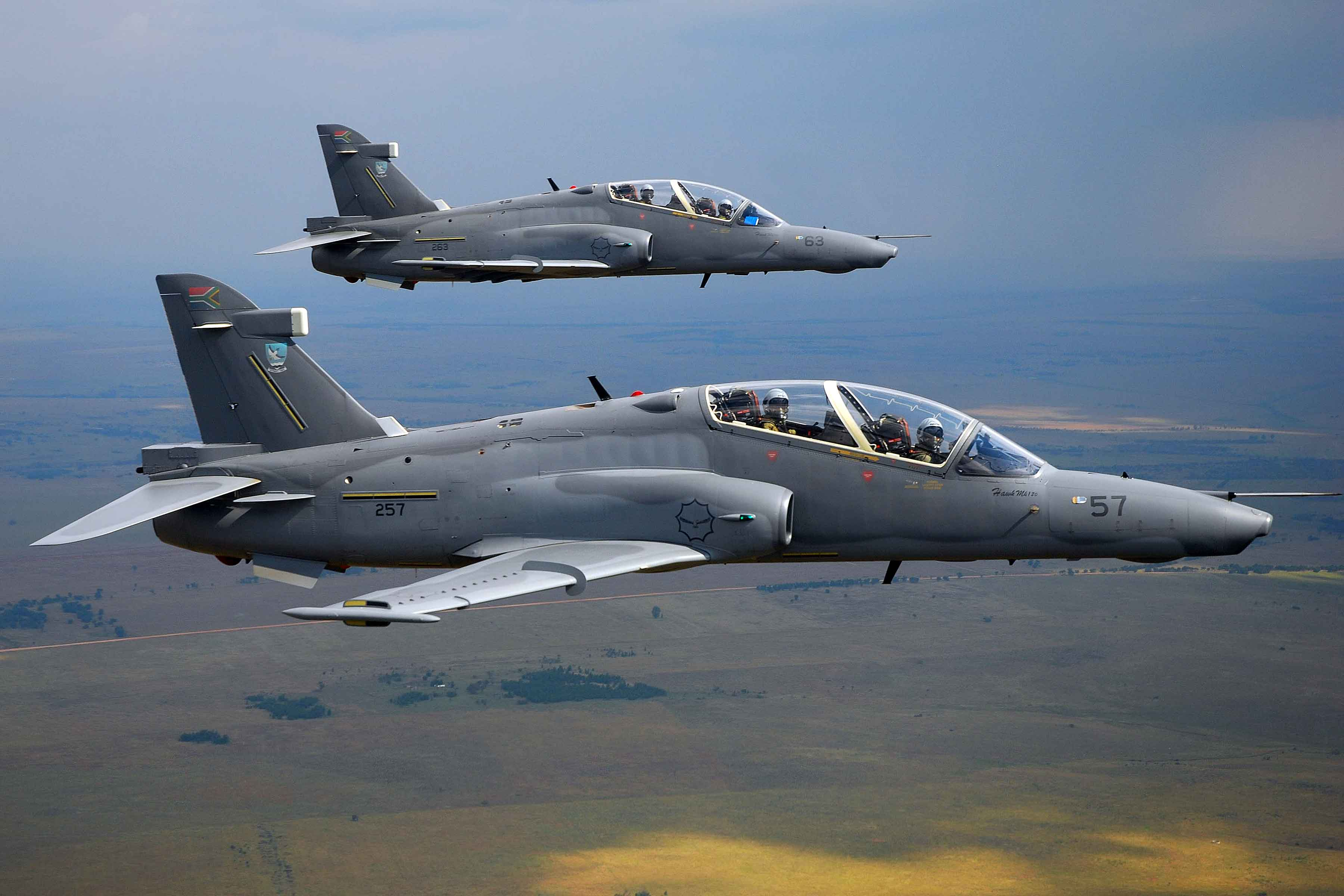
A pair of SAAF Hawk 120s in 2009

The Hawk Lead-in Fighter Trainer (LIFT) is the version selected by the South African Air Force in December 1999. This variant is powered by the Adour 951. The LIFT benefits from development carried out for the Australian Mk. 127.

The next generation Hawks (120, 127 and 128) feature a new wing, forward and centre fuselage, fin and tailplane. The aircraft have only 10% commonality with the existing first generation aircraft. The new variants also have four times the fatigue life of the original aircraft. 24 aircraft will be delivered.

=== Hawk 127 ===
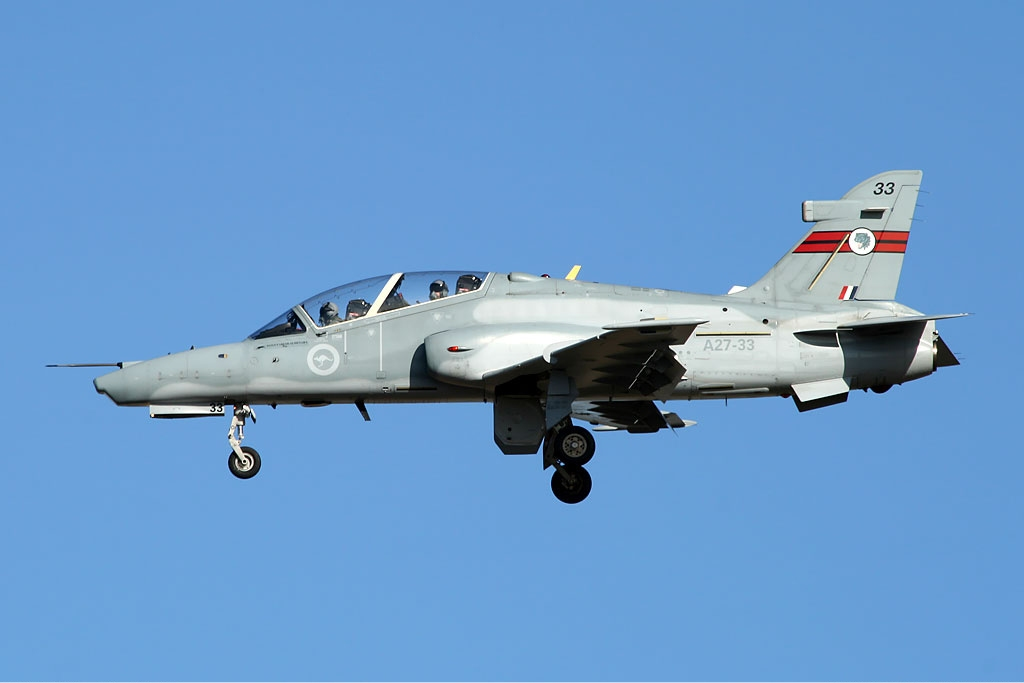
Hawk 127 of No. 76 Squadron RAAF at Avalon Airport, 2007

The Royal Australian Air Force ordered 33 Hawk 127 Lead-in Fighter Trainers (LIFTs) in June 1997, 12 of which were produced in the UK and 21 in Australia. This variant is also powered by the Adour 871. The Hawk 127 is operated by the RAAF's No. 76 Squadron and No. 79 Squadron, which are based at RAAF Base Williamtown and RAAF Base Pearce respectively. Work to upgrade the RAAF's Hawks to a standard similar to the Hawk 128 standard began in 2014, and it is planned that the two squadrons will begin operations with these aircraft in 2017. The RAAF's Hawk fleet has been upgraded to Hawk 128 standard under the Lead-In Fighter Capability Assurance Program (LIFCAP).

=== Hawk AJT ===
The BAE Systems Hawk Advanced Jet Trainer (AJT) differs from previous variants in that it features modern LCDs instead of conventional instrumentation and is powered by the Rolls-Royce Adour 951 engine. In 2012, orders were placed for the AJT version by the Royal Saudi Air Force and the Royal Air Force of Oman.

- Hawk 128 (Hawk T2) – Version for the RAF and Royal Navy. The Ministry of Defence awarded a Design and Development Contract to BAE Systems on 22 December 2004. The T2 builds on the design of the Australian Mk. 127 and the South African Mk. 120s.

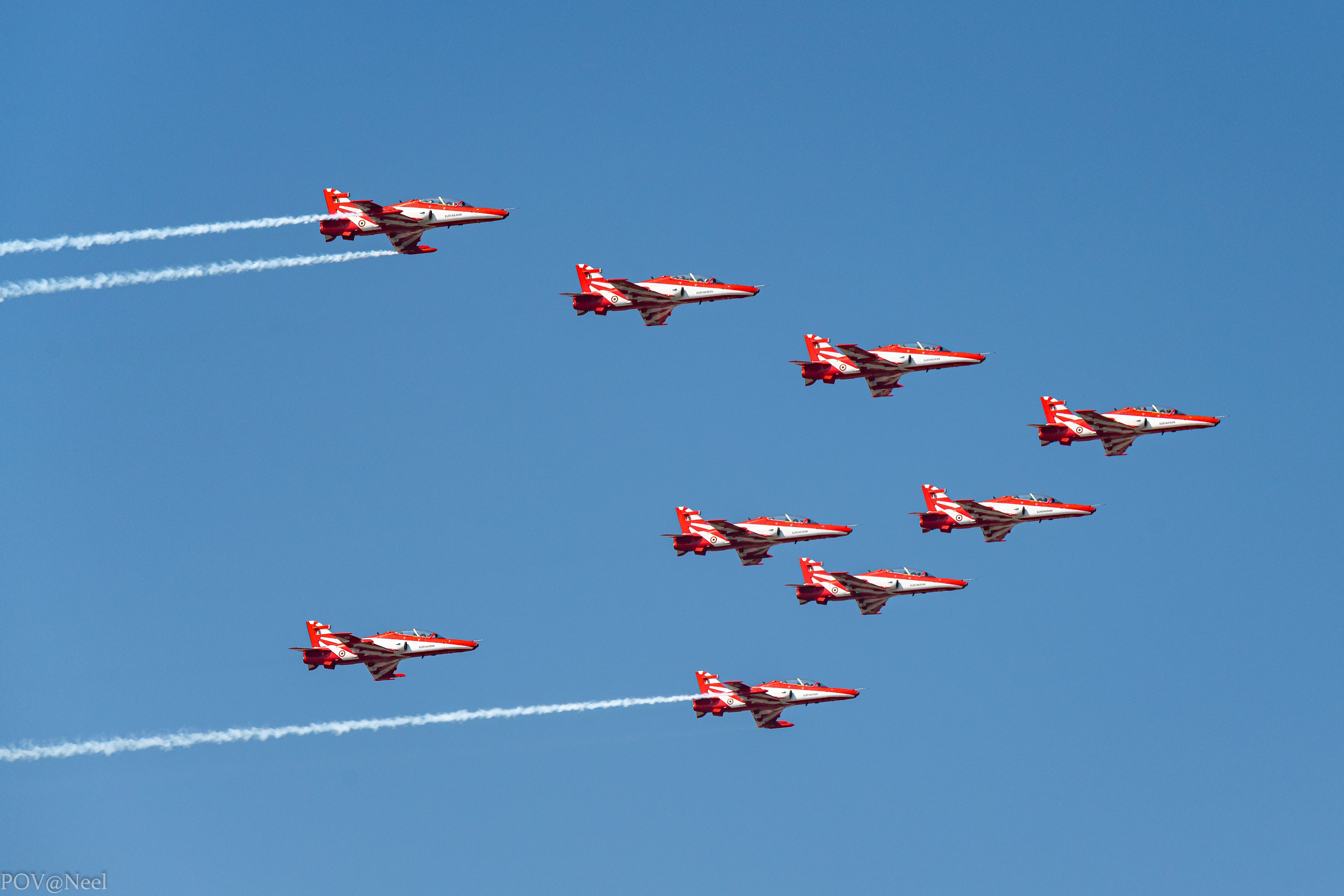
Hawk 132 of the Indian Air Force Surya Kiran display team

- Hawk 132 – Export version for the Indian Air Force (IAF) and was previously known as the Mk. 115Y. BAE Systems delivered the final of 24 UK-built Hawks to the IAF in November 2009. HAL handed over the first locally-built Hawk 132 on 14 August 2008. These aircraft are powered by the Rolls-Royce Adour Mk 871 engine. The variant is also used by the Indian Navy's INAS 551.
- Hawk 165 – Export version for the Royal Saudi Air Force. Twenty-two aircraft were originally built in the UK by BAE with delivery completed in 2017, whilst another 22 aircraft were built locally in Saudi Arabia with the first "locally built" aircraft delivered to the RSAF in June 2019 and a further 7 by October 2019. The last locally assembled Hawk 165 was formally handed over in February 2024 during the World Defense Show (WDS) in Riyadh.

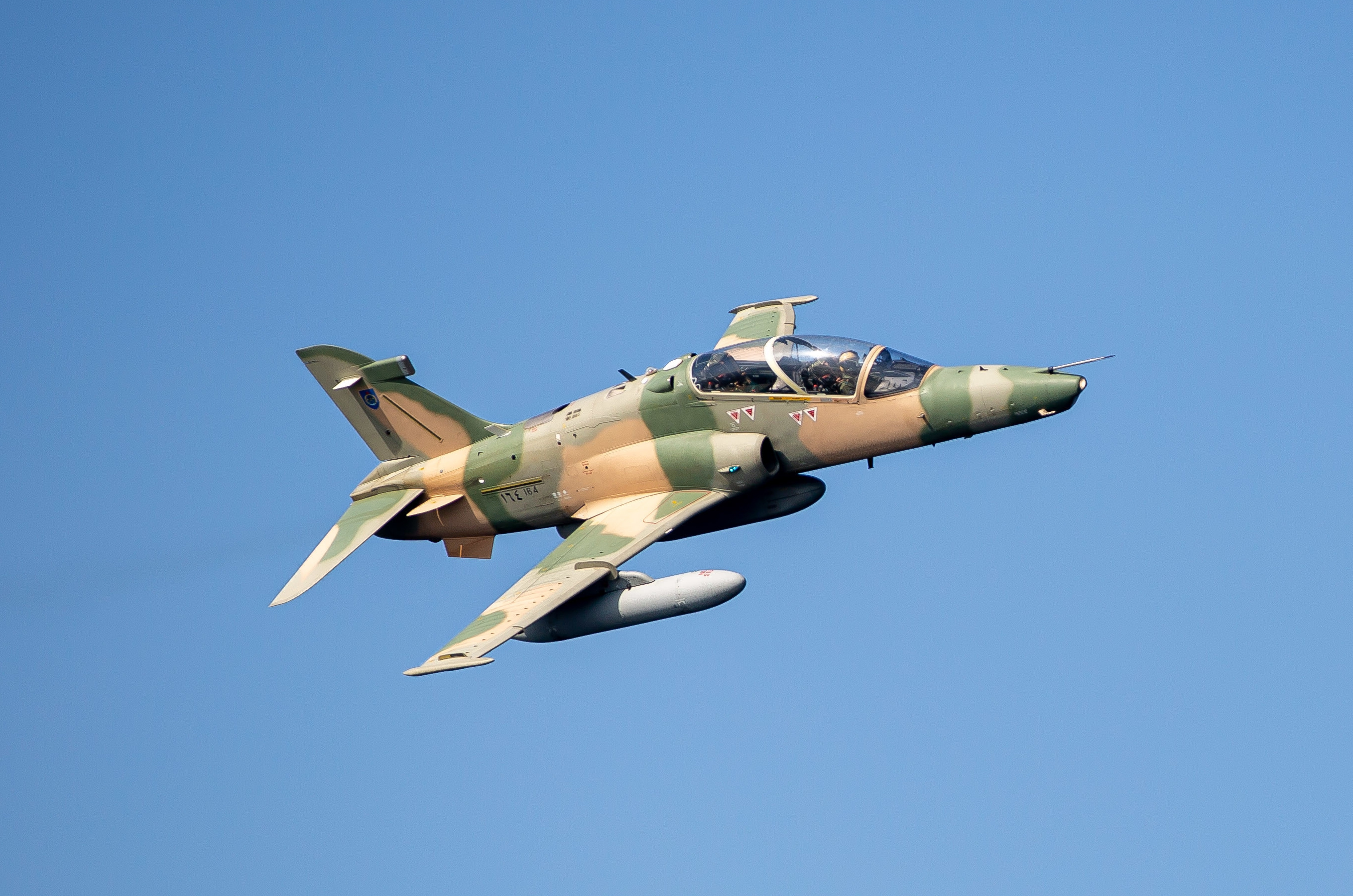
Royal Air Force of Oman BAE Hawk 166 in 2022

- Hawk 166 – Export version for the Royal Air Force of Oman. 8 aircraft were ordered in 2012 and built in the UK, with the first aircraft delivered in 2017.
- Hawk 167 – Export version for the Qatar Emiri Air Force (QEAF). 9 aircraft were ordered in 2018, with the first aircraft delivered in September 2021. The aircraft are based at RAF Leeming to operate with the RAF on the Joint RAF/QEAF AJT Training Squadron.

=== Hawk 200 ===
The Hawk 200 is a single-seat, lightweight multi-role combat aircraft for air defence, air-denial, anti-shipping, interdiction, close air support, and ground attack.

- Hawk 203 – Export version for the Royal Air Force of Oman. (12)
- Hawk 205 – Proposed export version for the Royal Saudi Air Force.
- Hawk 208 – Export version for the Royal Malaysian Air Force. (18)
- Hawk 209 – Export version for the Indonesian Air Force. (32)

=== T-45 Goshawk ===
The T-45 Goshawk is a carrier-capable aircraft developed from the Hawk 60 for the United States Navy for use in aircraft carrier training.

=== Advanced Hawk (Hawk-i) ===
The Advanced Hawk is a joint venture by BAE Systems and Hindustan Aeronautics Limited (HAL) to upgrade the IAF's existing Hawk 132 AJT into an Advanced Transonic Fighter Trainer, which can be used for combat operations. A single prototype of the aircraft was unveiled at Aero India 2017 in Bangalore, from 14-18 February 2017. It made its first flight with the IAF in June 2017.

== Operators ==
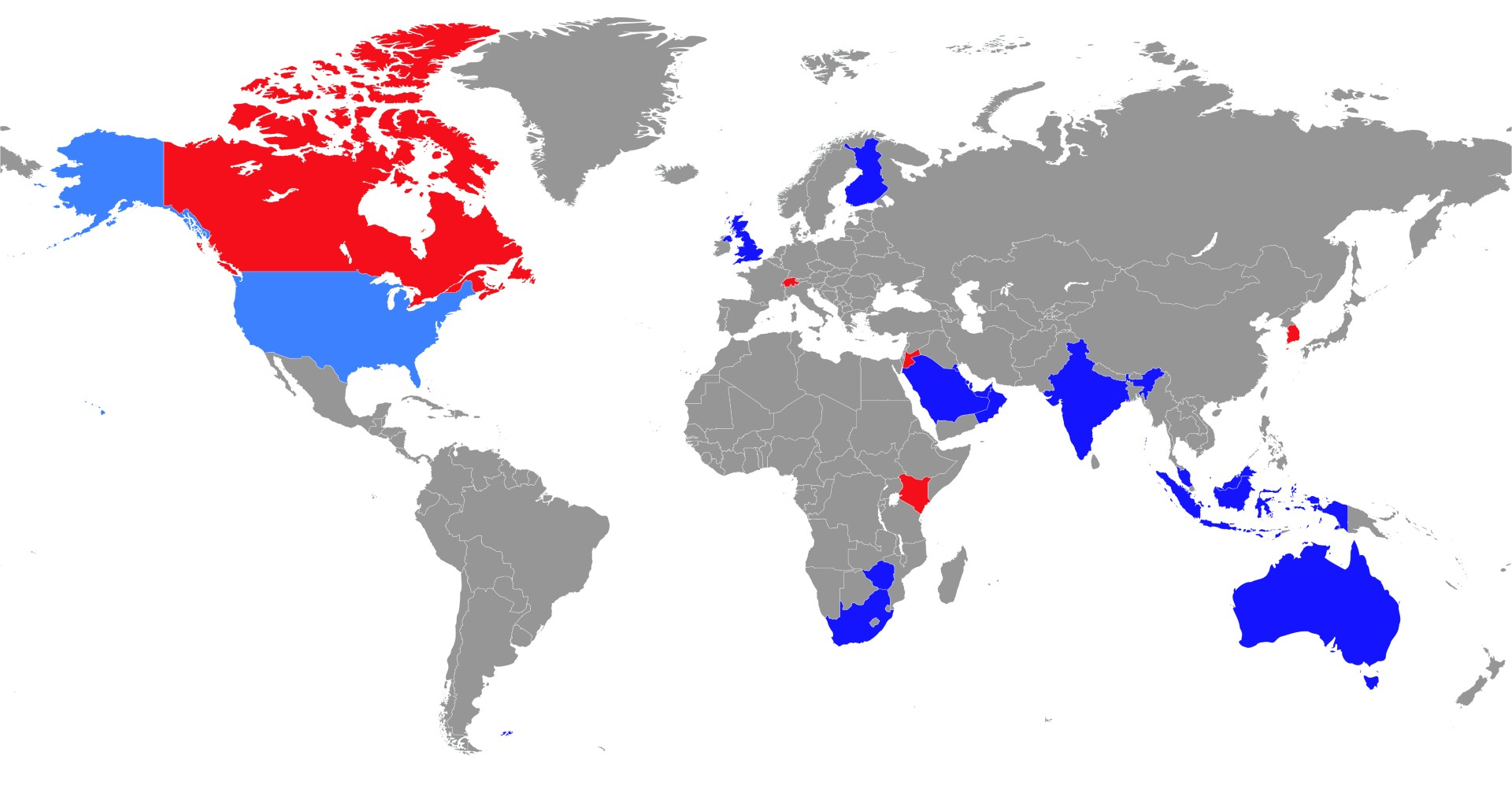
Operators Hawk T-45 Goshawk Former

Australia

- Royal Australian Air Force – 33 Hawk 127s (modernised to 128s)
  - No. 76 Squadron at RAAF Base Williamtown
  - No. 79 Squadron at RAAF Base Pearce

Bahrain

- Royal Bahraini Air Force – 6 Hawk 129s
  - No. 5 Squadron at Shaikh Isa

Finland

- Finnish Air Force – 32 Hawks (9 Mk.51 (out of 4 bought from UK & 46 manufactured in Finland), 7 Mk.51A (bought from UK in 1993-94), 16 Mk.66 (bought from Switzerland))
  - Fighter Squadron 41 (HävLLv 41)
  - Finnish Air Force Display Team Midnight Hawks

India

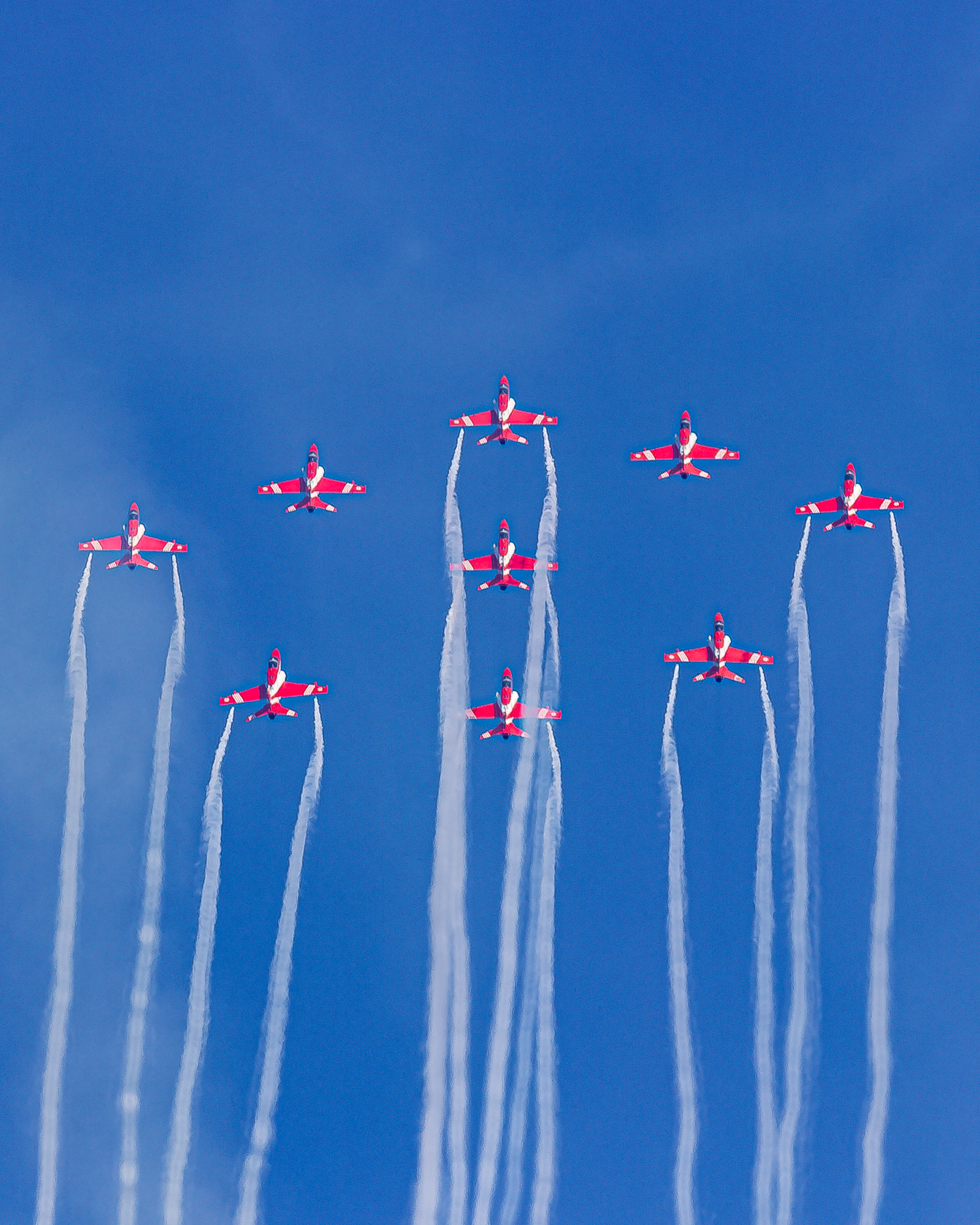
9 BAE Hawk Mk.132 of the Suryakiran Aerobatic Team in the diamond formation.

- Indian Air Force – 102 Hawk 132s
  - Bidar Air Force Station
    - IAF Aerobatic Team "Surya Kirans"
    - 52 Squadron "Sharks"
    - Operational Training Squadron B "Bravehearts"
    - Operational Training Squadron C "Cheethas"
    - Operational Training Squadron D "Deltas"
  - Kalaikunda Air Force Station
    - Operational Conversion Unit "The Young Ones"
- Indian Navy – 17 Hawk 132s
  - 551 Squadron "Phantoms" at INS Dega

Indonesia

- Indonesian Air Force – 22 Hawk 209s and 7 Hawk 109s
  - 1st Air Squadron "Equatorial Eagles" at Supadio Air Force Base

Kuwait

- Kuwait Air Force – 6 Hawk 64s
  - No. 12 Training Squadron "Flying School" at Ali AlSalem AB.

Malaysia

- Royal Malaysian Air Force – 4 Hawk 108s and 12 Hawk 208s
  - No. 6 Skuadron "Cakra" at RMAF Labuan Air Base.
  - No. 15 Skuadron "Panther" at at RMAF Butterworth Air Base (formerly)

Oman

- Royal Air Force of Oman – 11 Hawk 103/166 and 10 Hawk 203s
  - No. 6 Squadron at RAFO Masirah

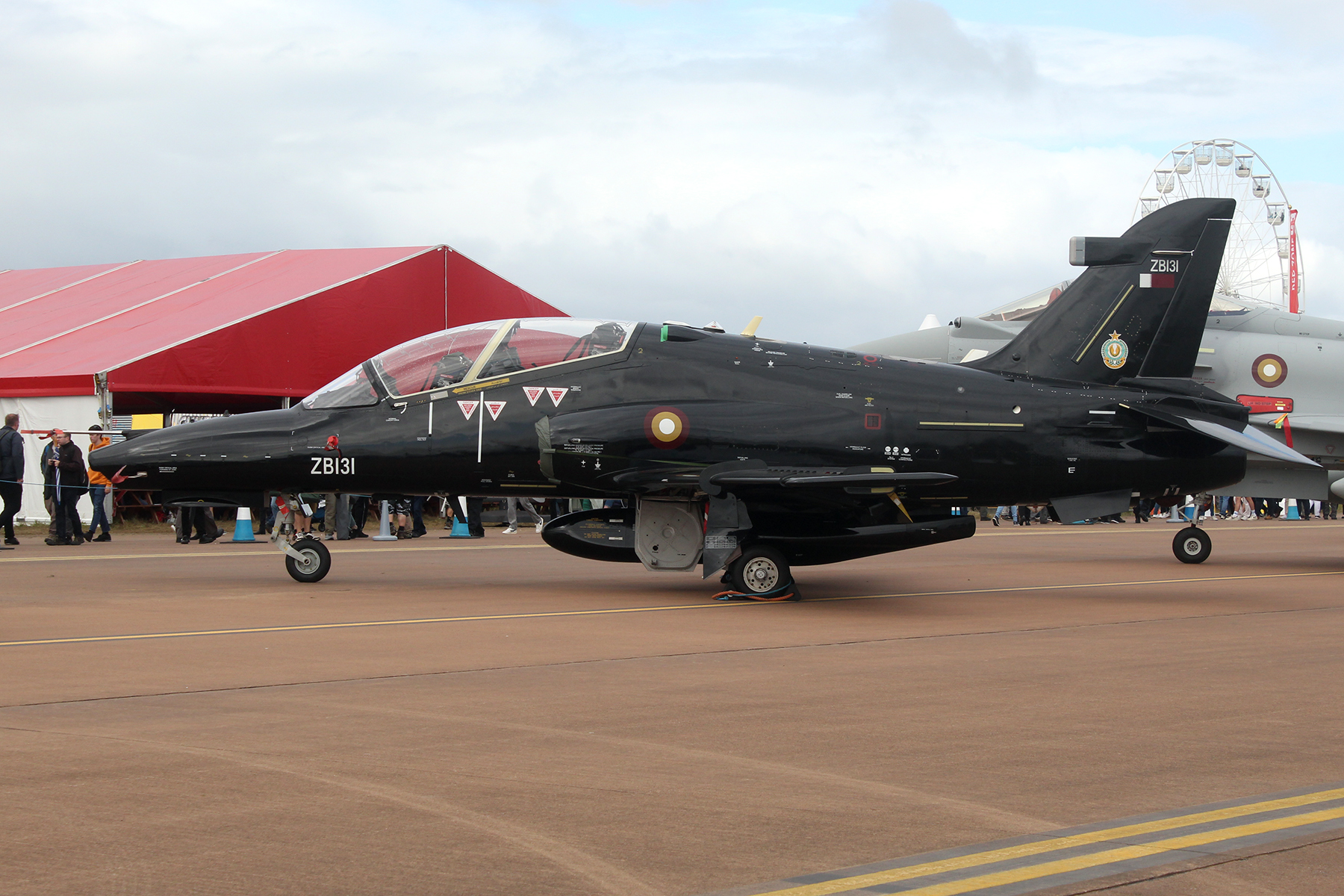
A Qatari Hawk in 2023

Qatar

- Qatar Emiri Air Force – 9 Hawk Mk.167s
  - 11 Squadron (Joint Hawk Training Squadron), at RAF Leeming, United Kingdom

Saudi Arabia

- Royal Saudi Air Force – 81 Hawk 65 /164s
  - No. 21 Squadron, at Tabuk/King Faisal Air Base
  - No. 37 Squadron, at Tabuk/King Faisal Air Base
  - No. 79 Squadron, at Tabuk/King Faisal Air Base
  - No. 88 Squadron "Saudi Falcons", at Tabuk/King Faisal Air Base

South Africa

- South African Air Force – 23 Hawk 120s
  - 85 Combat Flying School, at AFB Makhado

United Arab Emirates

- United Arab Emirates Air Force – 12 Hawk 102
  - No. 12 Squadron, at Al Minhad Air Base

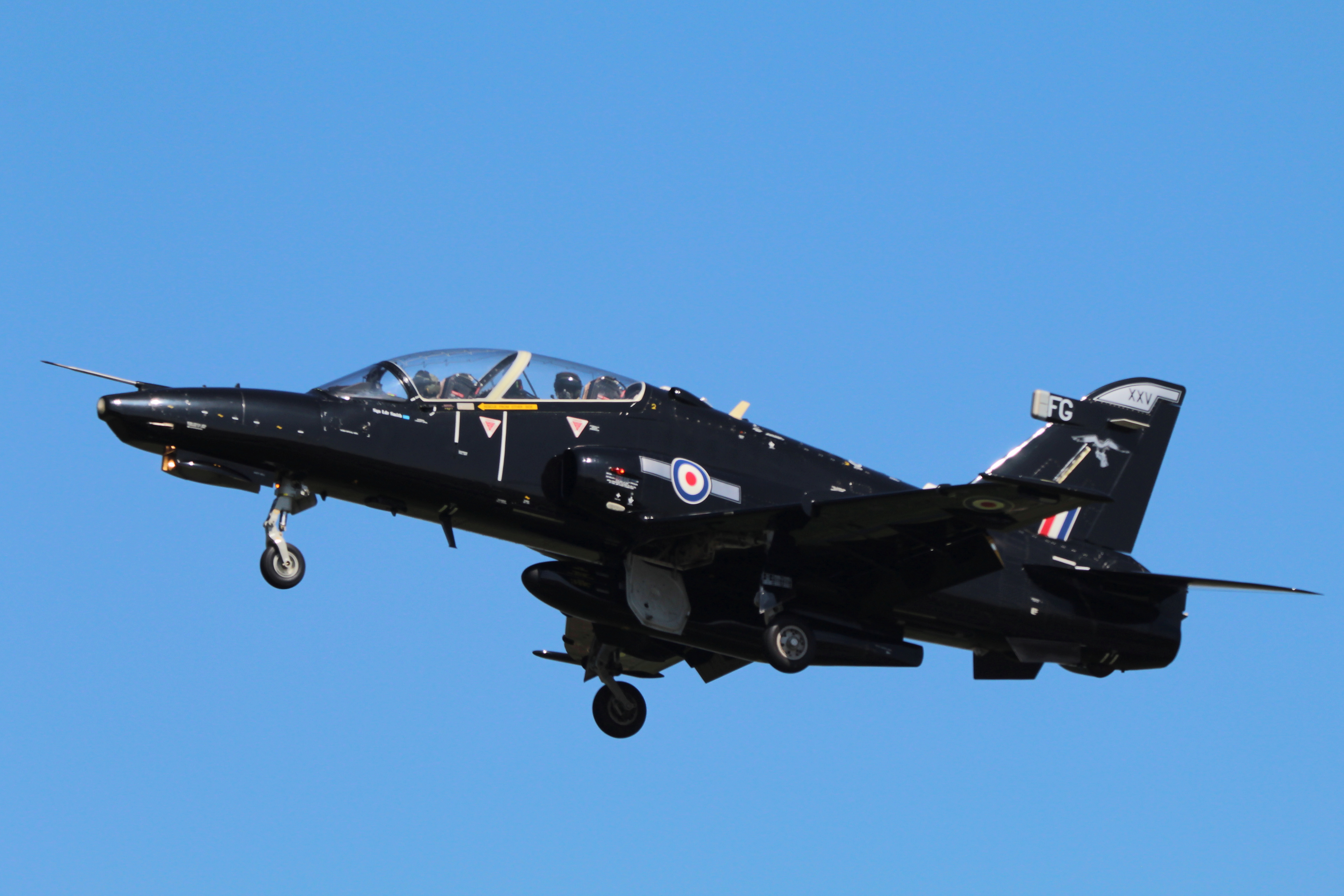
Hawk T2 of No. XXV (Fighter) Squadron, 2021

United Kingdom

- Royal Air Force – 17 Hawk T1s and 28 Hawk T2s
  - see Qatar above - Joint Hawk Training Squadron, at RAF Leeming (Qatari-owned Hawk 167s)
  - No. 4 Flying Training School, at RAF Valley (Hawk T2s)
    - No. IV Squadron at RAF Valley
    - No. XXV (Fighter) Squadron, at RAF Valley
  - RAF Aerobatic Team "Red Arrows", at RAF Waddington (Hawk T1s)

=== Civilian operators ===
United States

- RAVN Aerospace – 10 Hawk 67, formerly in service with the Republic of Korea Air Force

=== Former military operators ===
Canada

- Royal Canadian Air Force (formerly Canadian Forces Air Command) – 17 Hawk 115s (CT-155), retired in March 2024
  - 2 Canadian Forces Flying Training School at CFB Moose Jaw
  - 419 Tactical Fighter Training Squadron at CFB Cold Lake

Indonesia

- Indonesian Air Force – 20 Hawk 53 were in service between 1980 and 2015.
  - 103rd Education Squadron, 1st Education Wing at Adisutjipto Air Force Base
  - 15th Air Squadron, 3rd Air Wing at Iswahjudi Air Force Base

Jordan

- Jordanian Air Force – 13 Hawk 63 delivered from UAE, 12 withdrawn offered for sale
  - 17 Squadron, at Prince Hassan Air Base in lead in fighter training role.

Kenya

- Kenya Air Force – 7 Hawk 52s, out of service and retired as of 2012.

South Korea

- Republic of Korea Air Force introduced 20 T-59 (Hawk 67) in September 1992. Retired from service in 2013.
  - 216th Flight Training Squadron at Yecheon Air Base.

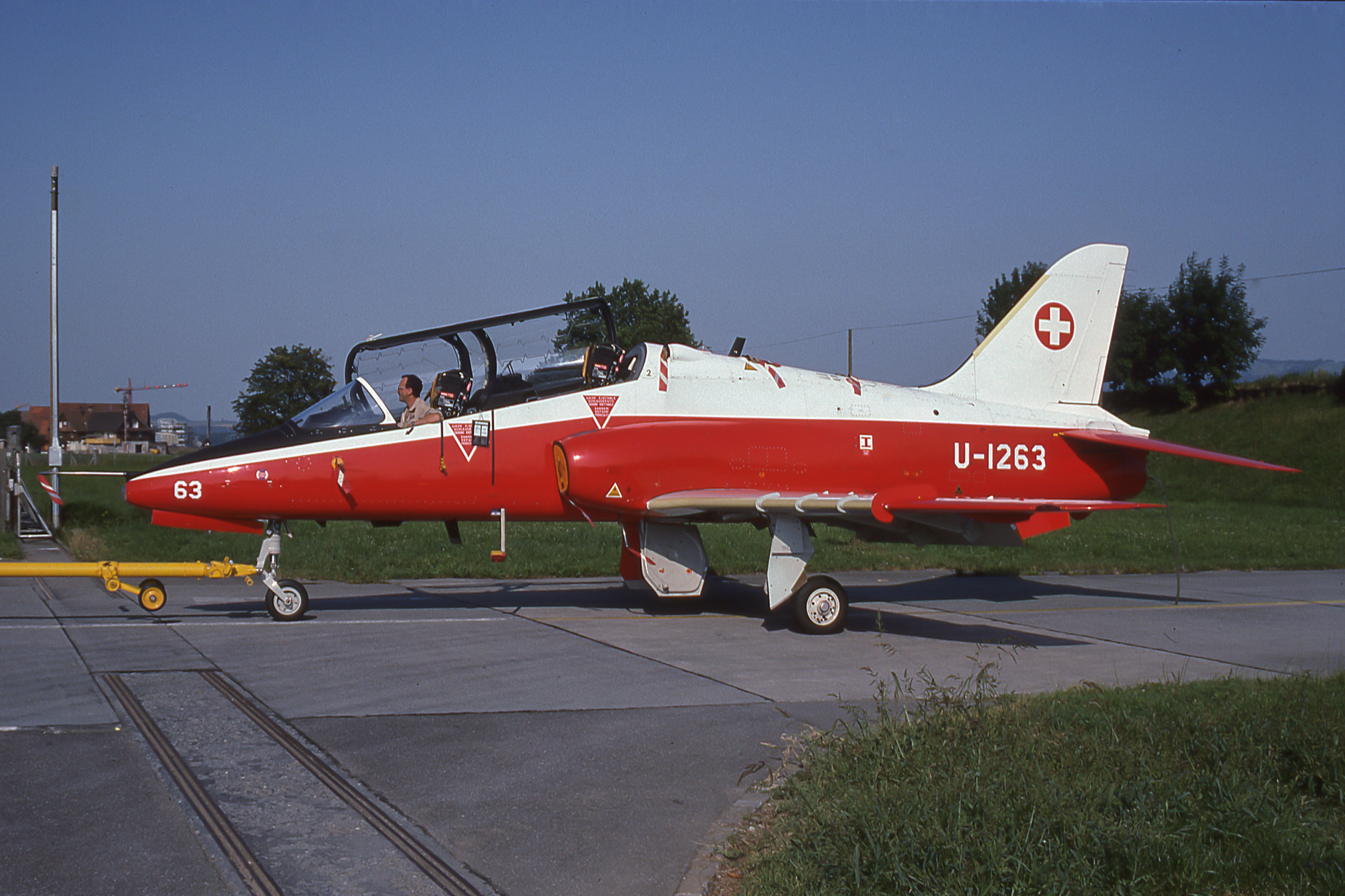
A Swiss Air Force BAe Hawk in 1991

Switzerland

- Swiss Air Force: 20 Hawk Mk. 66s were in service between 1990 and 2002, of which 18 were sold to Finland in June 2007. Replaced by F-5F as an interim measure until the delivery of eight Pilatus PC-21s.

United Kingdom

- Royal Air Force
  - No. 1 Group
    - No. 100 Squadron (1991–2022)
  - No. 4 Flying Training School (not current)
    - No. 74 (Reserve) Squadron (1992–2000)
    - No. 208 (R) Squadron (1994–2016)
    - No. 234 (R) Squadron (1992–1994)
  - No. 6 Flying Training School (not current)
  - No. 1 Tactical Weapons Unit (not current)
    - No. 79 (R) Squadron (1979–1992)
    - No. 234 (R) Squadron (1978–1992)
  - No. 2 Tactical Weapons Unit (not current)
    - No. 63 (R) Squadron (1980–1992)
    - No. 151 (R) Squadron (1981–1992)
  - No. 7 Flying Training School (not current)
    - No. 19 (R) Squadron (1992–2011)
    - No. 92 (R) Squadron (1992–1994)
  - Joint Forward Air Controller Training and Standards Unit (JFACTSU) (1993–2022)
  - RAF Centre of Aviation Medicine (1998–2022)
- Royal Navy – 17 Hawk T1s
  - Fleet Requirements and Aircraft Direction Unit (1994–2013)
  - Navy Flying Standards Flight (Fixed Wing) (1994–2012)
  - RNAS Yeovilton Hawk Detachment (2012–2013)
  - 736 Naval Air Squadron (2013–2022)

Zimbabwe

- Air Force of Zimbabwe – 12 Hawk 60 retired as of 2011 because of lack of spares and lack of BAE support. Some were returned to service in 2022.
  - No. 2 Squadron Cobra at Gweru-Thornhill

== Aircraft on display ==
Estonia

- HW-326 Hawk Mk.51 on display at the Estonian Aviation Museum, Lange.

Finland

- HW-301 Hawk Mk.51 on display at the Finnish Air Force Museum, Jyväskylä
- HW-303 Hawk Mk.51 on display at Kauhava Town, South Ostrobothnia
- HW-306 Hawk Mk.51 on display at Kymi, Kymenlaakso

Indonesia

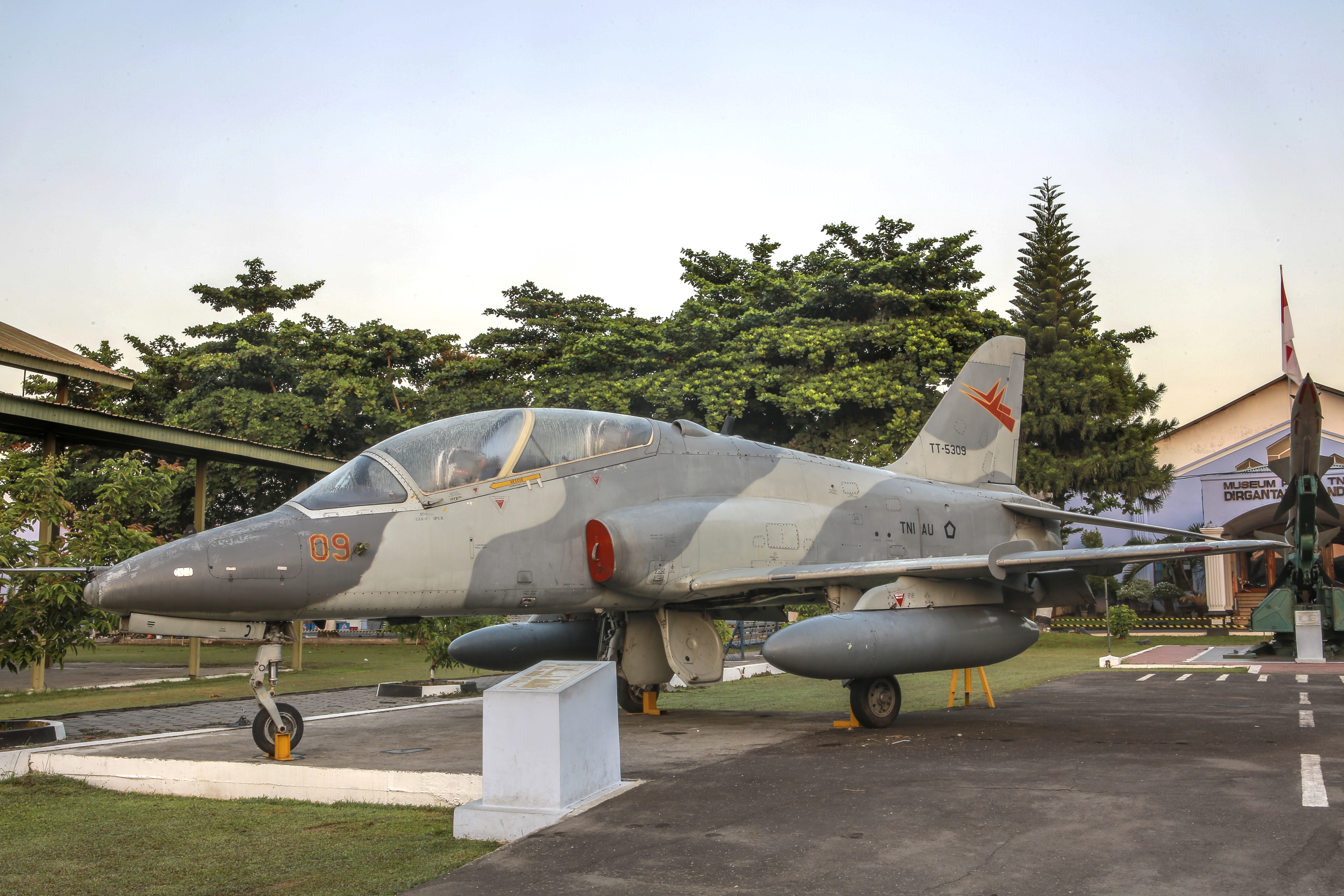
Indonesian Air Force Hawk 53 of the 15th Air Squadron at Dirgantara Mandala Museum

- TT-1208 Hawk Mk.209 on display at 1st Air Force Operations Command, Halim Perdanakusuma AFB, East Jakarta, Jakarta
- TT-1216 Hawk Mk.209 on display at Aneuk Galong intersection, Aceh Besar Regency, Aceh
- TT-0229 Hawk Mk.209 on display near Dumpil (Madiun) freeway toll gate in Madiun Regency, East Java
- TT-5301 Hawk Mk.53 on display at Air Force Material Maintenance Command, Bandung, West Java
- TT-5305 Hawk Mk.53 on display at Iswahyudi Air Force Base, Magetan, East Java
- TT-5309 Hawk Mk.53 on display at Dirgantara Mandala Museum, Sleman Regency, Special Region of Yogyakarta
- TT-5312 Hawk Mk.53 on display at Indonesian National Armed Forces Command and Staff School, Bandung, West Java
- TT-5314 Hawk Mk.53 on display at Raha, Muna Regency, Southeast Sulawesi
- TT-5316 Hawk Mk.53 on display at National Air Defense Training and Education Center, Surabaya, East Java

Switzerland

- U-1251 Hawk Mk.66 on display at Flieger-Flab-Museum, Dübendorf
- HW-310 Hawk Mk.51 on display as U-1271 at Museum Clin d'Ailes, Payerne

United Kingdom

- XX154 Hawk T1 on display at Boscombe Down Aviation Collection, Wiltshire
- XX156 Hawk T1 on the gate at RAF Valley, Anglesey, Wales
- XX238 Hawk T.1 on display at the South Yorkshire Aircraft Museum, Doncaster
- XX240 Hawk T1 in preserved condition at Cornwall Aviation Heritage Centre, Newquay, Cornwall, England. Adjacent to RAF St Mawgan.
- XX247 Hawk T1A on the gate at RAF Woodvale, Merseyside, England
- XX253 Hawk T1A on display at RAF Scampton, Lincolnshire, England
- XX260 Ex-Red Arrows Hawk T1A on display at the Ulster Aviation Society in Maze Long Kesh, Lisburn, Northern Ireland
- XX306 Hawk T1A on the gate at RAF Scampton, Lincolnshire, England
- XX308 Hawk T1A on display at National Museum of Flight, East Lothian, Scotland
- ZA101 Hawk 100 on display at Brooklands Museum, Surrey, England
- ZK531 Hawk Mk.53 on display at Humberside Airport, Lincolnshire, England
- TT-5313 Hawk Mk.53 on the gate Brough Aerodrome, East Riding of Yorkshire, England

== Accidents and incidents ==
On 1 April 2018, a BAE Hawk Mk 166 crashed on landing at RAFO Masirah, Oman, killing the student pilot and one person on the ground; only the flight instructor survived with serious injuries.

On 23 September 2026, a Hawk T2 crashed at RAF Valley. Both crew ejected and were reported as having minor injuries when taken to the Royal Centre for Defence Medicine, Birmingham, via air ambulance for treatment and further assessment.

== Specifications (Hawk 128) ==
BAE Hawk 128 3-view drawing

Data from Royal Air Force, BAE Systems, Ministry of Defence

General characteristics

- Crew: 2: student, instructor
- Length: 12.43 m (40 ft 9 in)
- Wingspan: 9.94 m (32 ft 7 in)
- Height: 3.98 m (13 ft 1 in)
- Wing area: 16.70 m^{2} (179.64 ft^{2})
- Empty weight: 4,480 kg (9,880 lb)
- Useful load: 3,000 kg (6,600 lb)
- Max takeoff weight: 9,100 kg (20,000 lb)
- Powerplant: 1× Rolls-Royce Turbomeca Adour Mk. 951 turbofan with FADEC, 29 kN (6,500 lbf) 29 kN

Performance

- Never exceed speed: Mach 1.2 (in dive)
- Maximum speed: Mach 0.84 (1,028 km/h, 639 mph, 555 kn) at altitude
- Range: 2,520 km (1,360 nmi, 1,565 mi)
- Service ceiling: 13,565 m (44,500 ft)
- Rate of climb: 47 m/s (9,300 ft/min)
- Thrust/weight: 0.65

Armament

Note: all armament is optional.

- 1× 30 mm ADEN cannon, in centreline pod
- Up to 6,800 lb (3,085 kg) of weapons on five hardpoints, including:
  - 4× AIM-9 Sidewinder or ASRAAM or A-Darter on wing pylons and wingtip rails
  - 2x Umbani or Al Tariq
  - Smart Anti-Airfield Weapon
- 1,500 lb (680 kg), limited to one centreline and two wing pylons (Hawk T1)

== See also ==
- Folland Gnat
- SEPECAT Jaguar

Related development

- British Aerospace Hawk 200
- McDonnell Douglas T-45 Goshawk

Aircraft of comparable role, configuration, and era

- Aermacchi MB-339
- Aero L-39 Albatros
- AIDC AT-3
- CASA C-101 Aviojet
- Dassault/Dornier Alpha Jet
- FMA IA-63 Pampa
- IAR 99
- PZL I-22 Iryda
- Soko G-4 Super Galeb

Related lists

- List of active Canadian military aircraft
- List of active United Kingdom military aircraft
