= No. 29 Squadron RSAF =

- Active: Unknown-present
- Country: Saudi Arabia
- Branch: Royal Saudi Air Force
- Type: Squadron
- Part of: RSAF 7 Wing
- Base: King Faisal Air Base, Tabuk
- Aircraft: McDonnell Douglas F-15SA Strike Eagle

No. 29 Squadron RSAF is a squadron of the Royal Saudi Air Force that operates the McDonnell Douglas F-15SA Strike Eagle at King Faisal Air Base, Tabuk, Tabuk Province in Saudi Arabia within RSAF 7 Wing.
