= Prince Sultan bin Abdulaziz Airport =

Airport in Tabuk, Saudi Arabia

Prince Sultan bin Abdulaziz International Airport
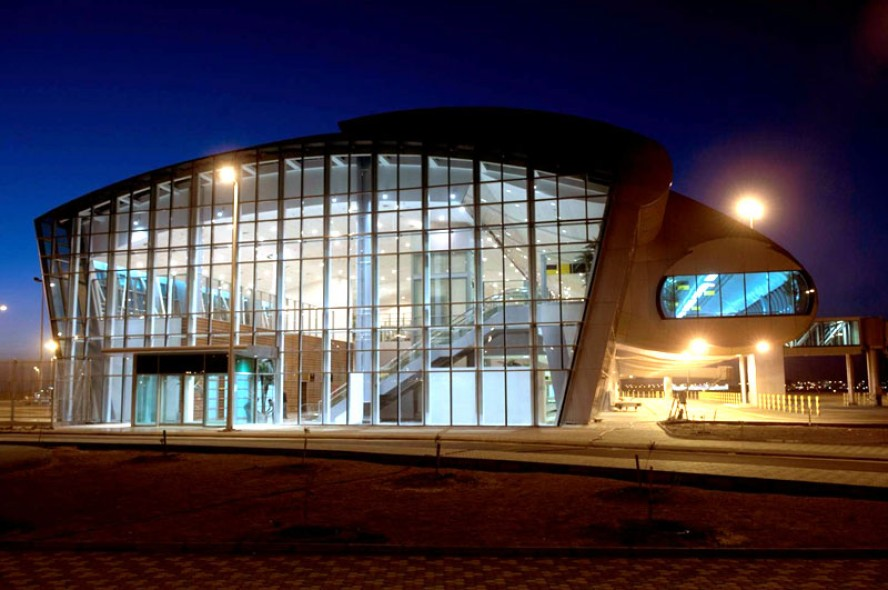
- IATA: TUU; ICAO: OETB

Summary
- Airport type: Public / Military
- Owner: General Authority of Civil Aviation
- Operator: Cluster2 Airports; Royal Saudi Air Force (military)
- Serves: Tabuk Province
- Location: Tabuk City, Tabuk Province, Saudi Arabia
- Elevation AMSL: 2,551 ft (778 m)
- Coordinates: 28°22′23″N 036°37′17″E
- Website: Official website

Map
- Location of airport in Saudi Arabia

Runways
Direction	Length		Surface
Direction	ft	m	Surface
06/24	10,991	3,350	Asphalt
13/31	10,007	3,050	Asphalt

Statistics (2024)
- Passengers: 2.4 million
- Aircraft movements: 18,800
- Sources: DoD FLIP, GACA

Prince Sultan bin Abdulaziz International Airport, more commonly known as Tabuk Airport (IATA: TUU, ICAO: OETB), is a joint civil-military airport located in Tabuk, Saudi Arabia. It is operated by Cluster2 Airports. A new passenger terminal of more than 16,000 square metres (170,000 sq ft), with two air bridges and capacity for 1,500 passengers per hour, opened in April 2011 at a cost of 242 million riyals, allowing international flights. In 2024 it handled about 2.4 million passengers.

== Airlines and destinations ==
Airlines	Destinations
Air Arabia	Cairo, Sharjah
Air Cairo	Assiut, Cairo, Sohag
Azimuth	Seasonal: Sochi
flyadeal	Dammam, Riyadh
flydubai	Dubai–International
Flynas	Medina
Qatar Airways	Doha
Saudia	Jeddah, Riyadh

== Statistics ==
Traffic grew from about 686,000 passengers in 2010 to 1.79 million in 2019. It fell by more than half in 2020 during the COVID-19 pandemic and passed its pre-pandemic level in 2023.

Annual passenger traffic
Year	Domestic	International	Total	Change
2010	684,959	748	685,707	—N/a
2011	756,896	36,698	793,594	▲15.7%
2012	902,315	75,130	977,445	▲23.2%
2013	911,528	81,615	993,143	▲1.6%
2014	1,000,585	89,581	1,090,166	▲9.8%
2015	1,126,607	181,272	1,307,879	▲20.0%
2016	1,105,016	222,313	1,327,329	▲1.5%
2017	1,195,042	199,087	1,394,129	▲5.0%
2018	1,413,804	175,484	1,589,288	▲14.0%
2019	1,600,999	185,961	1,786,960	▲12.4%
2020	739,647	51,728	791,375	▼55.7%
2021	1,057,690	49,885	1,107,575	▲40.0%
2022	1,248,223	180,405	1,428,628	▲29.0%
2023	1,461,518	399,327	1,860,845	▲30.3%
2024	—N/a		c. 2,400,000	▲ c. 29%

== Accidents and incidents ==
- On 10 July 1972, Douglas C-47B HZ-AAK of Saudia was damaged beyond economic repair when it veered off the runway on landing at Tabuk Airport.
- On 30 September 2026, Flydubai Flight 1073, a Boeing 737 MAX 8 flying from Dubai to Tel Aviv, diverted to Tabuk after an altercation between its pilots, in which one pilot was reportedly stabbed. Both pilots were taken to hospital; the airline said all passengers were safe.

== Military use ==
King Faisal Air Base
- قاعدة الملك فيصل الجوية
- Tabuk in Saudi Arabia
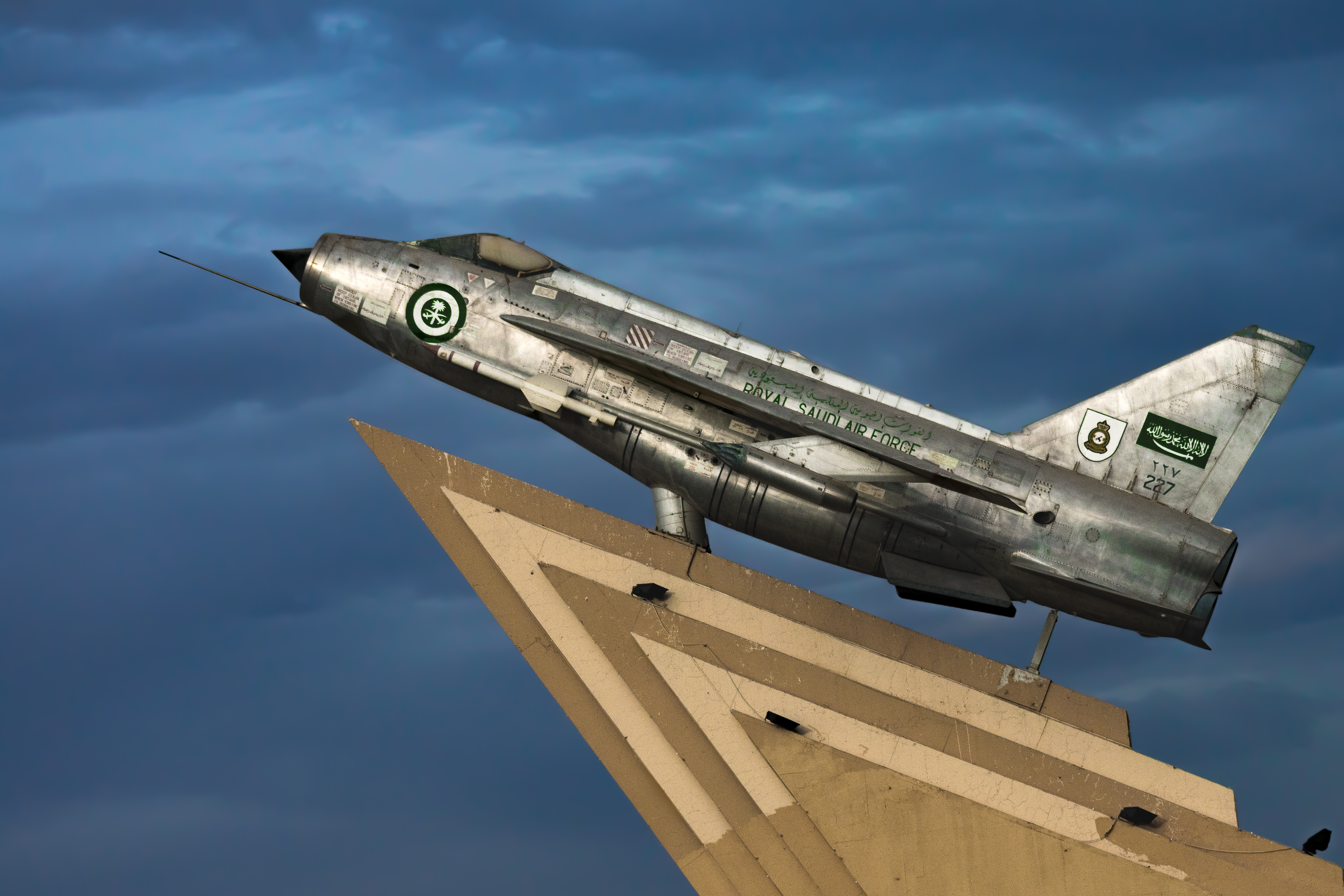
- An English Electric Lightning gate guardian at King Faisal AB

Site information
- Type: Air base
- Operator: Royal Saudi Air Force

King Faisal Air Base (KFAB) of the Royal Saudi Air Force shares the airport site and boundaries but uses a separate runway for operations.

The base is home to:

- RSAF 7 Wing
  - No. 2 Squadron RSAF with the McDonnell Douglas F-15C Eagle and the F-15D
  - No. 21 Squadron RSAF with the BAE Systems Hawk 165
  - No. 29 Squadron RSAF with the F-15SA
  - No. 37 Squadron RSAF with the Hawk 65
  - No. 79 Squadron RSAF with the Hawk 165
  - No. 88 Squadron RSAF with the Hawk 65 and the Hawk 65A which is known as the 'Saudi Falcons'

== See also ==
- Transport in Saudi Arabia
- List of airports in Saudi Arabia
