= List of Flynas destinations =

This is a list of cities that Flynas flies as of March 2024.

== List ==
Country	City	Airport	Notes	Refs
Albania	Tirana	Tirana International Airport Nënë Tereza	Seasonal	
Algeria	Algiers	Houari Boumediene Airport		
Algeria	Constantine	Mohamed Boudiaf International Airport		
Austria	Salzburg	Salzburg Airport	Seasonal	
Austria	Vienna	Vienna International Airport	Seasonal	
Armenia	Yerevan	Zvartnots International Airport	Seasonal	
Azerbaijan	Baku	Heydar Aliyev International Airport		
Bahrain	Muharraq	Bahrain International Airport		
Belgium	Brussels	Brussels Airport		
Bangladesh	Dhaka	Hazrat Shahjalal International Airport		
Bosnia and Herzegovina	Sarajevo	Sarajevo International Airport		
Czech Republic	Prague	Václav Havel Airport Prague	Seasonal	
Djibouti	Djibouti City	Djibouti–Ambouli International Airport		
Egypt	Alexandria	Borg El Arab International Airport	Terminated	
Egypt	Assiut	Assiut Airport		
Egypt	Aswan	Aswan Airport	Terminated	
Egypt	Cairo	Cairo International Airport		
Egypt	El Dabaa	El Alamein International Airport		
Egypt	Giza	Sphinx International Airport		
Egypt	Hurghada	Hurghada International Airport	Seasonal	
Egypt	Luxor	Luxor International Airport	Terminated	
Egypt	Sharm El Sheikh	Sharm El Sheikh International Airport	Seasonal	
Egypt	Sohag	Sohag International Airport		
Eritrea	Asmara	Asmara International Airport		
Ethiopia	Addis Ababa	Addis Ababa Bole International Airport		
France	Marseille	Marseille Provence Airport		
Georgia	Tbilisi	Tbilisi International Airport		
Georgia	Batumi	Batumi International Airport	Seasonal	
Germany	Berlin	Berlin Brandenburg Airport		
Greece	Mykonos	Mykonos Airport	Seasonal	
Greece	Santorini	Santorini (Thira) International Airport	Seasonal	
India	Delhi	Indira Gandhi International Airport		
India	Hyderabad	Rajiv Gandhi International Airport		
India	Kochi	Cochin International Airport		
India	Kozhikode	Calicut International Airport	Seasonal	
India	Lucknow	Chaudhary Charan Singh Airport		
India	Mumbai	Chhatrapati Shivaji Maharaj International Airport		
Indonesia	Jakarta	Soekarno–Hatta International Airport	Charter	
Indonesia	Makassar	Hasanuddin International Airport	Charter	
Indonesia	Medan	Kualanamu International Airport	Charter	
Indonesia	Surabaya	Juanda International Airport	Charter	
Iraq	Baghdad	Baghdad International Airport		
Iraq	Erbil	Erbil International Airport		
Iraq	Najaf	Al Najaf International Airport		
Jordan	Amman	Queen Alia International Airport		
Kazakhstan	Almaty	Almaty International Airport		
Kosovo	Pristina	Pristina International Airport	Begins 1 October 2025	
Kuwait	Kuwait City	Kuwait International Airport		
Kyrgyzstan	Bishkek	Manas International Airport		
Kyrgyzstan	Osh	Osh Airport		
Lebanon	Beirut	Beirut–Rafic Hariri International Airport		
Malaysia	Kuala Lumpur	Kuala Lumpur International Airport	Terminated	
Maldives	Malé	Velana International Airport		
Morocco	Casablanca	Mohammed V International Airport		
Montenegro	Podgorica	Podgorica Airport	Seasonal	
Montenegro	Tivat	Tivat Airport	Seasonal	
Nigeria	Kano	Kano International Airport		
Oman	Salalah	Salalah Airport	Seasonal	
Pakistan	Islamabad	Islamabad International Airport		
Pakistan	Karachi	Jinnah International Airport		
Pakistan	Lahore	Allama Iqbal International Airport		
Pakistan	Faisalabad	Faisalabad International Airport		
Pakistan	Peshawar	Bacha Khan International Airport	Terminated	
Poland	Kraków	Kraków John Paul II International Airport	Seasonal	
Qatar	Doha	Hamad International Airport		
Russia	Moscow	Vnukovo International Airport		
Saudi Arabia	Abha	Abha International Airport	Secondary Hub	
Saudi Arabia	Al-Jawf	Al Jawf International Airport		
Saudi Arabia	Al-Ula	Al-Ula International Airport		
Saudi Arabia	Al Bahah	Al-Baha Domestic Airport		
Saudi Arabia	Bisha	Bisha Domestic Airport		
Saudi Arabia	Dammam	King Fahd International Airport	Secondary Hub	
Saudi Arabia	Gassim	Prince Naif bin Abdulaziz International Airport		
Saudi Arabia	Ha'il	Ḥa'il Regional Airport		
Saudi Arabia	Jeddah	King Abdulaziz International Airport	Hub	
Saudi Arabia	Jizan	King Abdullah bin Abdulaziz International Airport		
Saudi Arabia	Medina	Prince Mohammad bin Abdulaziz International Airport	Secondary Hub	
Saudi Arabia	Najran	Najran Regional Airport		
Saudi Arabia	Qurayyat	Gurayat Domestic Airport		
Saudi Arabia	Riyadh	King Khalid International Airport	Secondary Hub	
Saudi Arabia	Tabuk	Prince Sultan bin Abdulaziz Airport		
Saudi Arabia	Taif	Taif International Airport		
Saudi Arabia	Wadi Al-Dawasir	Wadi al-Dawasir Domestic Airport		
Serbia	Belgrade	Belgrade Nikola Tesla Airport	Seasonal	
Sudan	Khartoum	Khartoum International Airport		
Syria	Damascus	Damascus International Airport		
Turkey	Adana	Adana Şakirpaşa Airport		
Turkey	Ankara	Ankara Esenboğa Airport		
Turkey	Antakya	Hatay Airport	Terminated	
Turkey	Antalya	Antalya Airport	Seasonal	
Turkey	Bodrum	Milas–Bodrum Airport		
Turkey	Istanbul	Istanbul Airport	Seasonal	
Turkey	Istanbul	Sabiha Gökçen International Airport		
Turkey	Trabzon	Trabzon Airport		
Uganda	Entebbe	Entebbe International Airport		
United Arab Emirates	Abu Dhabi	Zayed International Airport		
United Arab Emirates	Dubai	Al Maktoum International Airport		
United Arab Emirates	Dubai	Dubai International Airport		
United Arab Emirates	Sharjah	Sharjah International Airport		
United Kingdom	London	Gatwick Airport	Terminated	
United Kingdom	Manchester	Manchester Airport	Terminated	
Ukraine	Kyiv	Boryspil International Airport	Terminated	
Ukraine	Lviv	Lviv Danylo Halytskyi International Airport	Terminated	
Ukraine	Odesa	Odesa International Airport	Terminated	
Uzbekistan	Namangan	Namangan Airport		
Uzbekistan	Tashkent	Tashkent International Airport		
