= No. 15 Squadron RSAF =

- Active: 1980s-present
- Country: Saudi Arabia
- Branch: Royal Saudi Air Force
- Type: Squadron
- Part of: RSAF 16 Wing
- Base: Al Jouf Air Base, Sakaka
- Aircraft: McDonnell Douglas F-15SA Strike Eagle

No. 15 Squadron RSAF is a squadron of the Royal Saudi Air Force that operates the McDonnell Douglas F-15SA Strike Eagle at Al Jouf Air Base, Sakaka, Al-Jouf Province in Saudi Arabia within RSAF 16 Wing.

During the 1980s the squadron operated the Northrop F-5F Tiger IIs from King Abdulaziz Air Base, Dharan.
