= No. 44 Squadron RSAF =

No. 45 Squadron RSAF
- Active: Unknown-present
- Country: Saudi Arabia
- Branch: Royal Saudi Air Force
- Type: Squadron
- Part of: RSAF 16 Wing
- Base: Al Jouf Air Base, Sakaka
- Aircraft: Agusta-Bell AB 412EP; Bell 412EP

No. 45 Squadron RSAF is a squadron of the Royal Saudi Air Force that operates the Agusta-Bell AB 412EP and the Bell 412EP at Al Jouf Air Base, Sakaka, Al-Jouf Province in Saudi Arabia within RSAF 16 Wing.
