= Boeing E-3 Sentry =

Airborne early warning and control aircraft based on Boeing 707 airframe

E-3 Sentry
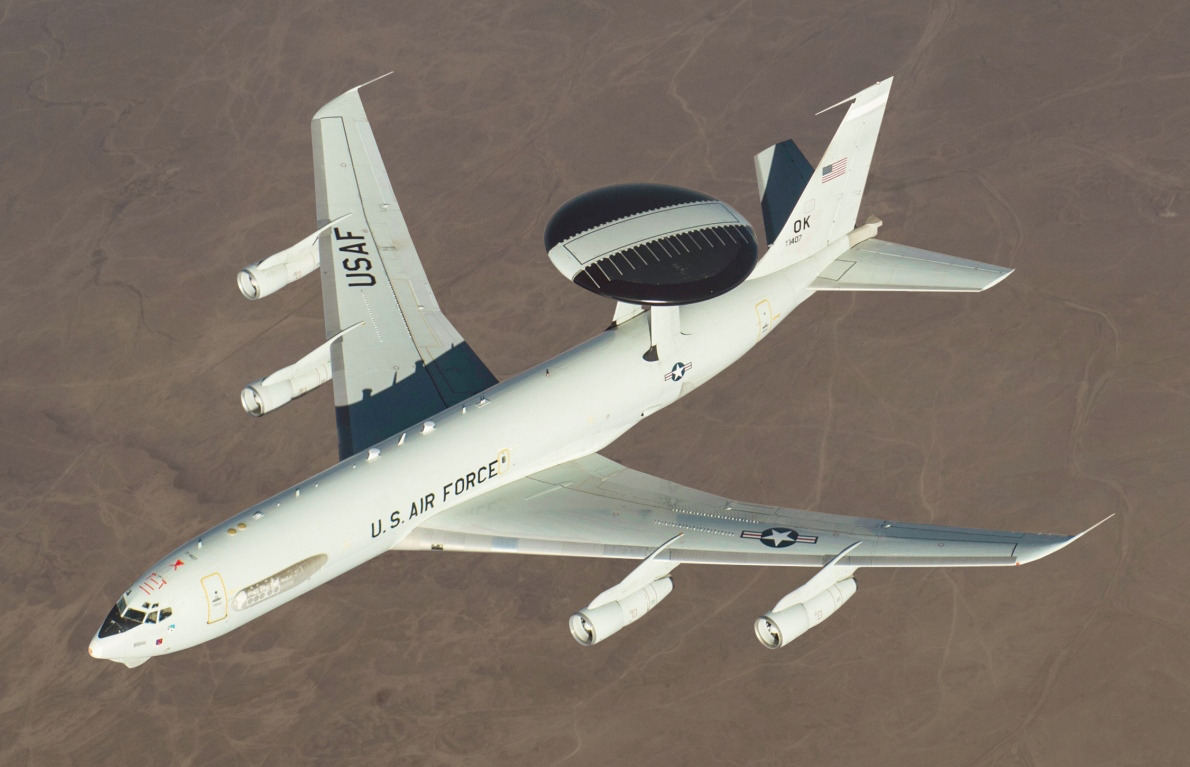
- An E-3 Sentry of the United States Air Force

General information
- Type: Airborne early warning and control (AEW&C)
- National origin: United States
- Manufacturer: Boeing Defense, Space & Security
- Status: In service
- Primary users: United States Air Force NATO; Royal Air Force (former); Royal Saudi Air Force
- Number built: 68

History
- Manufactured: 1977–1992
- Introduction date: March 1977
- First flight: EC-137D: 9 February 1972; E-3: 25 May 1976
- Retired: 2021 (RAF)
- Developed from: Boeing 707

The Boeing E-3 Sentry is an American airborne early warning and control (AEW&C) aircraft developed by Boeing. E-3s are commonly known as AWACS (Airborne Warning and Control System). Derived from the Boeing 707 airliner, it provides all-weather surveillance, command, control, and communications, and is used by the United States Air Force, NATO, French Air and Space Force, Royal Saudi Air Force and Chilean Air Force. The E-3 has a distinctive rotating radar dome (rotodome) above the fuselage. Production ended in 1992 after 68 aircraft had been built.

In the mid-1960s, the U.S. Air Force (USAF) was seeking an aircraft to replace its piston-engined Lockheed EC-121 Warning Star, which had been in service for over a decade. After issuing preliminary development contracts to three companies, the USAF picked Boeing to construct two airframes to test Westinghouse Electric's and Hughes's competing radars. Both radars used pulse-Doppler technology, with Westinghouse's design emerging as the contract winner. Testing on the first production E-3 began in October 1975.

The first USAF E-3 was delivered in March 1977, and during the next seven years, 34 aircraft were manufactured. E-3s were also purchased by NATO (18), the United Kingdom (7), France (4) and Saudi Arabia (5). In 1991, when the last aircraft was delivered, E-3s participated in the Persian Gulf War, playing a crucial role in directing coalition aircraft against Iraqi forces.

The aircraft's capabilities have been maintained and enhanced through numerous upgrades. In 1996, Westinghouse Electric's Defense & Electronic Systems division was acquired by Northrop Corporation and renamed Northrop Grumman Mission Systems; the company supports the E-3's radar. In 2026, it was reported the E-3 was expected to remain in US service until 2035. The U.S. Air Force had planned to replace the E-3 with the Boeing E-7 Wedgetail, but in 2025 intended instead to use space-based technology including the proposed Golden Dome and the E-2D Advanced Hawkeye. This planned cancellation was subsequently reversed in May 2026.

== Development ==
=== Background ===
In 1963, the USAF asked for proposals for an Airborne Warning and Control System (AWACS) to replace its EC-121 Warning Stars, which had served in the airborne early warning role for over a decade. The new aircraft would take advantage of improvements in radar technology and computer-aided radar data analysis and data reduction. These developments allowed airborne radars to "look down", i.e. to detect the movement of low-flying aircraft, and discriminate, even over land, target aircraft's movements; this was previously impossible due to the inability to discriminate an aircraft's track from ground clutter. Contracts were issued to Boeing, Douglas, and Lockheed, the latter being eliminated in July 1966. In 1967, a parallel program was put into place to develop the radar, with Westinghouse Electric Corporation and Hughes Aircraft asked to compete in producing the radar system. In 1968, it was referred to as Overland Radar Technology (ORT) during development tests on the modified EC-121Q. The Westinghouse radar antenna was going to be used by whichever company won the radar competition since Westinghouse had pioneered the design of high-power radio frequency (RF) phase-shifters, which focus the RF energy into a pencil beam and enable electronic scanning for altitude determination.

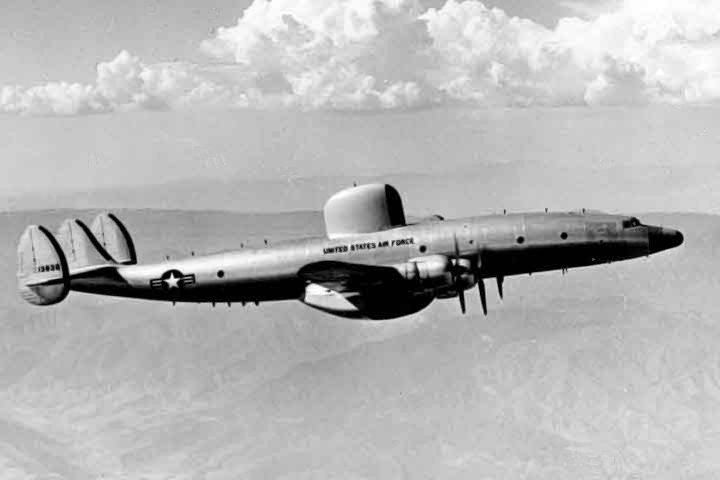
The piston-engined EC-121 Warning Star, a military version of the Lockheed Constellation, saw service in the mid-1950s.

Boeing initially proposed a purpose-built aircraft, but tests indicated it would not outperform the already-operational 707, so the latter was chosen instead. To increase endurance, this design was to be powered by eight General Electric TF34 engines. It would carry its radar in a rotating dome mounted at the top of a forward-swept tail, above the fuselage. Boeing was selected ahead of McDonnell Douglas's DC-8-based proposal in July 1970. Initial orders were placed for two aircraft, designated EC-137D to serve as test beds to evaluate the two competing radar systems. As the test beds did not need the same 14-hour endurance demanded of the production aircraft, the EC-137s retained the Pratt & Whitney JT3D commercial engines, and a later reduction in the endurance requirement led to retention of the JT3D engines in production.

The first EC-137 made its maiden flight on 9 February 1972, with the fly-off between the two radars taking place from March to July of that year. Favorable test results led to the selection of Westinghouse's radar for the production aircraft. Hughes' radar was initially thought to be a certain winner due to its related development of the APG-63 radar for the new F-15 Eagle. The Westinghouse radar used a pipelined fast Fourier transform (FFT) to digitally resolve 128 Doppler frequencies, while Hughes's radars used analog filters based on the design for the F-15. Westinghouse's engineering team won this competition by using a programmable 18-bit computer whose software could be modified before each mission. This computer was the AN/AYK-8 design from the B-57G program, and designated AYK-8-EP1 for its much expanded memory. This radar also multiplexed a beyond-the-horizon (BTH) pulse mode that could complement the pulse-Doppler radar mode. This proved to be beneficial especially when the BTH mode is used to detect ships at sea when the radar beam is directed below the horizon.

=== Full-scale development ===
Approval was given on 26 January 1973 for the full-scale development of the AWACS system. To allow further development of the aircraft's systems, orders were placed for three preproduction aircraft, the first of which performed its maiden flight in February 1975. IBM and Hazeltine were selected to develop the mission computer and display system. The IBM computer was designated 4PI, and the software was written in JOVIAL. A Semi-Automatic Ground Environment (SAGE) or back-up interceptor control (BUIC) operator would immediately be at home with the track displays and tabular displays, but differences in symbology would create compatibility problems in tactical ground radar systems in Iceland, mainland Europe, and South Korea over Link-11 (TADIL-A). In 1977, Iran placed an order for ten E-3s; however this was cancelled following the Iranian Revolution.

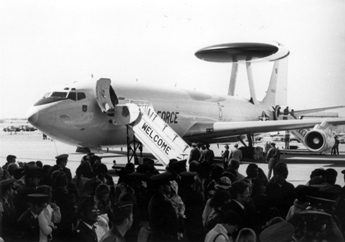
A welcome ceremony for the first E-3 aircraft at Tinker AFB in 1977

Engineering, test and evaluation began on the first E-3 Sentry in October 1975. Between 1977 and 1992, a total of 68 E-3s were built.

=== Future status ===
Because the Boeing 707 is no longer in production, the E-3 mission package has been fitted into the Boeing E-767 for the Japan Air Self Defense Forces. The E-10 MC2A was intended to replace the USAF E-3s—along with the RC-135 and the E-8 Joint STARS, but the program was cancelled by the Department of Defense.

NATO intends to extend the operational status of its AWACS until 2035, when it is due to be replaced by the Alliance Future Surveillance and Control (AFSC) program. The Royal Air Force chose to limit investment in its E-3D fleet in the early 2000s, diverting Sentry upgrade funds to a replacement program. On 22 March 2019, the UK Defence Secretary announced a $1.98 billion contract to purchase five Boeing E-7 Wedgetails. The order was later reduced to three aircraft. The U.S. Air Force intends to retire 15 of its 31 E-3s and acquire the E-7.

On 31 March 2023, the USAF retired an E-3 from service for the first time. The US is planning to replace the E-3 with the Space-Based Airborne Moving Target Indicator (SB-AMTI) system.

NATO is to replace the E-3 with Saab GlobalEye on Bombardier Global airframes.

== Design ==
=== Overview ===
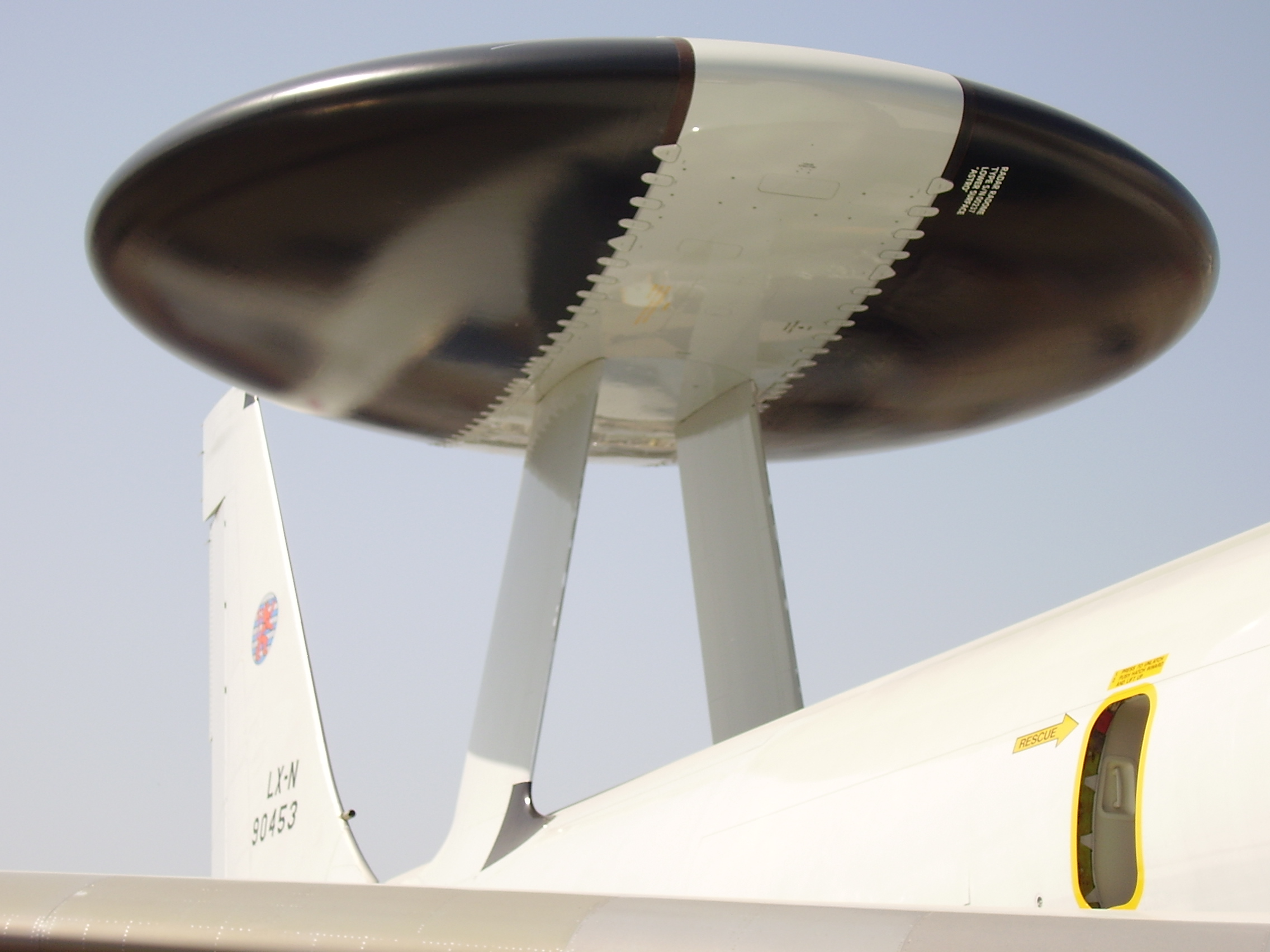
Close-up rotodome revolving at 6 revolutions per minute.

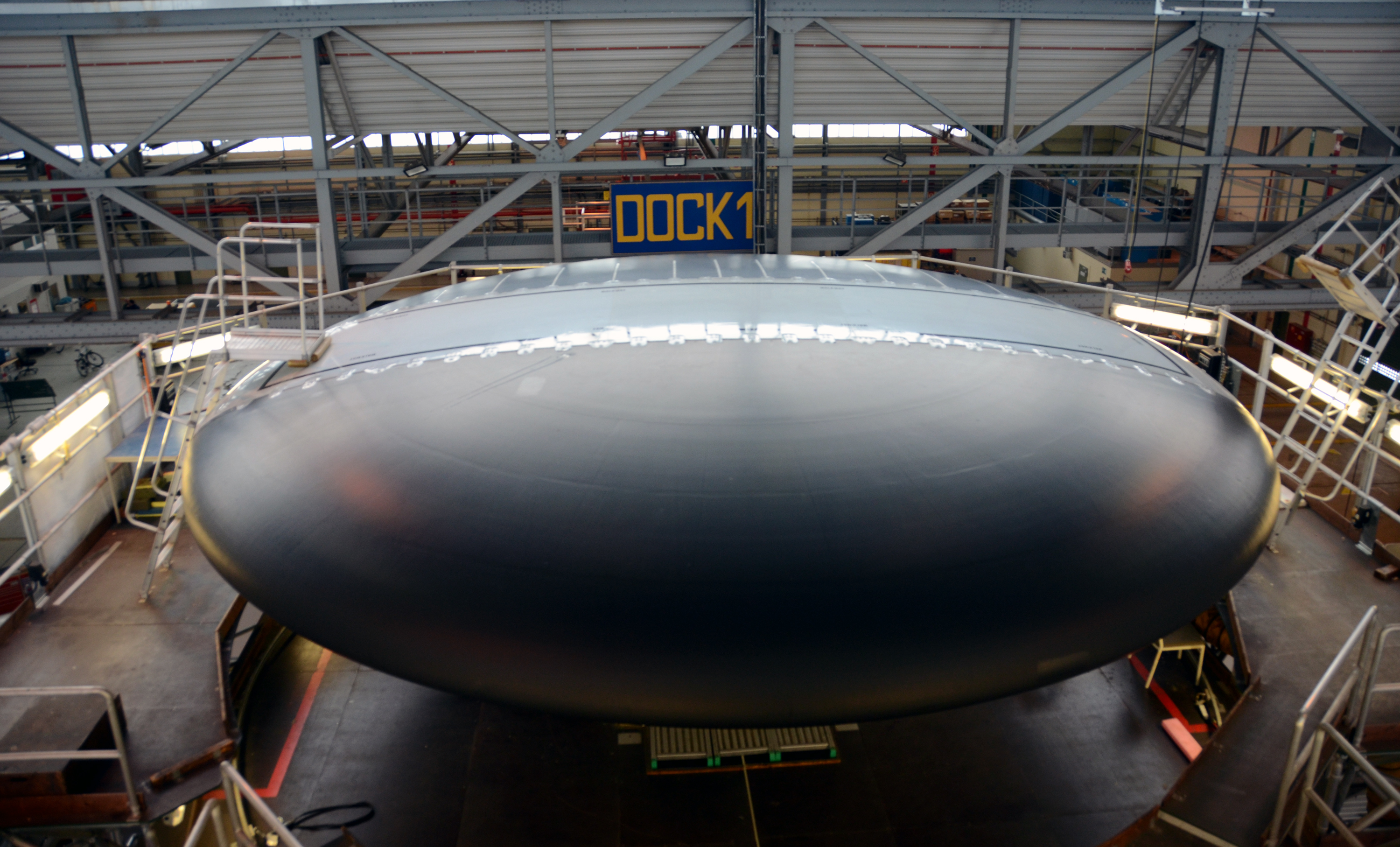
Close-up rotodome

The E-3 Sentry's airframe is a modified Boeing 707-320B Advanced model. Modifications include a rotating radar dome (rotodome), uprated hydraulics from 241 to 345 bar (3500–5000 psi) to drive the rotodome, single-point ground refueling, air refueling, and a bail-out tunnel or chute. A second bail-out chute was deleted to cut mounting costs.

USAF and NATO E-3s have an unrefueled range of more than 5,000 nmi (9,300 km) and an endurance of 8 hours. The newer E-3 versions bought by France, Saudi Arabia, and the UK are equipped with newer CFM56-2 turbofan engines, and these can fly for about 11 hours or more than 9,250 km (5,750 mi). The Sentry's range and on-station time can be increased through air-to-air refueling and the crews can work in shifts by the use of an on-board crew rest and meals area.

When deployed, the E-3 monitors an assigned area of the battlefield and provides information for commanders of air operations to gain and maintain control of the battle; while as an air defense asset, E-3s can detect, identify, and track airborne enemy forces far from the boundaries of the U.S. or NATO countries and can direct interceptor aircraft to these targets. In support of air-to-ground operations, the E-3 can provide direct information needed for interdiction, reconnaissance, airlift, and close-air support for friendly ground forces.

=== Avionics ===
The unpressurized rotodome is 30 ft (9.1 m) in diameter, 6 ft (1.8 m) thick at the center, and is held 11 ft (3.4 m) above the fuselage by 2 struts. It is tilted down at the front to reduce its aerodynamic drag, which lessens its detrimental effect on take-offs and endurance. This tilt is corrected electronically by both the radar and secondary surveillance radar antenna phase shifters. The rotodome uses bleed air, outside cooling doors, and fluorocarbon-based cold plate cooling to maintain the electronic and mechanical equipment temperatures. The hydraulically rotated antenna system permits the AN/APY-1 and AN/APY-2 passive electronically scanned array radar system to provide surveillance from the Earth's surface up into the stratosphere, over land or water.

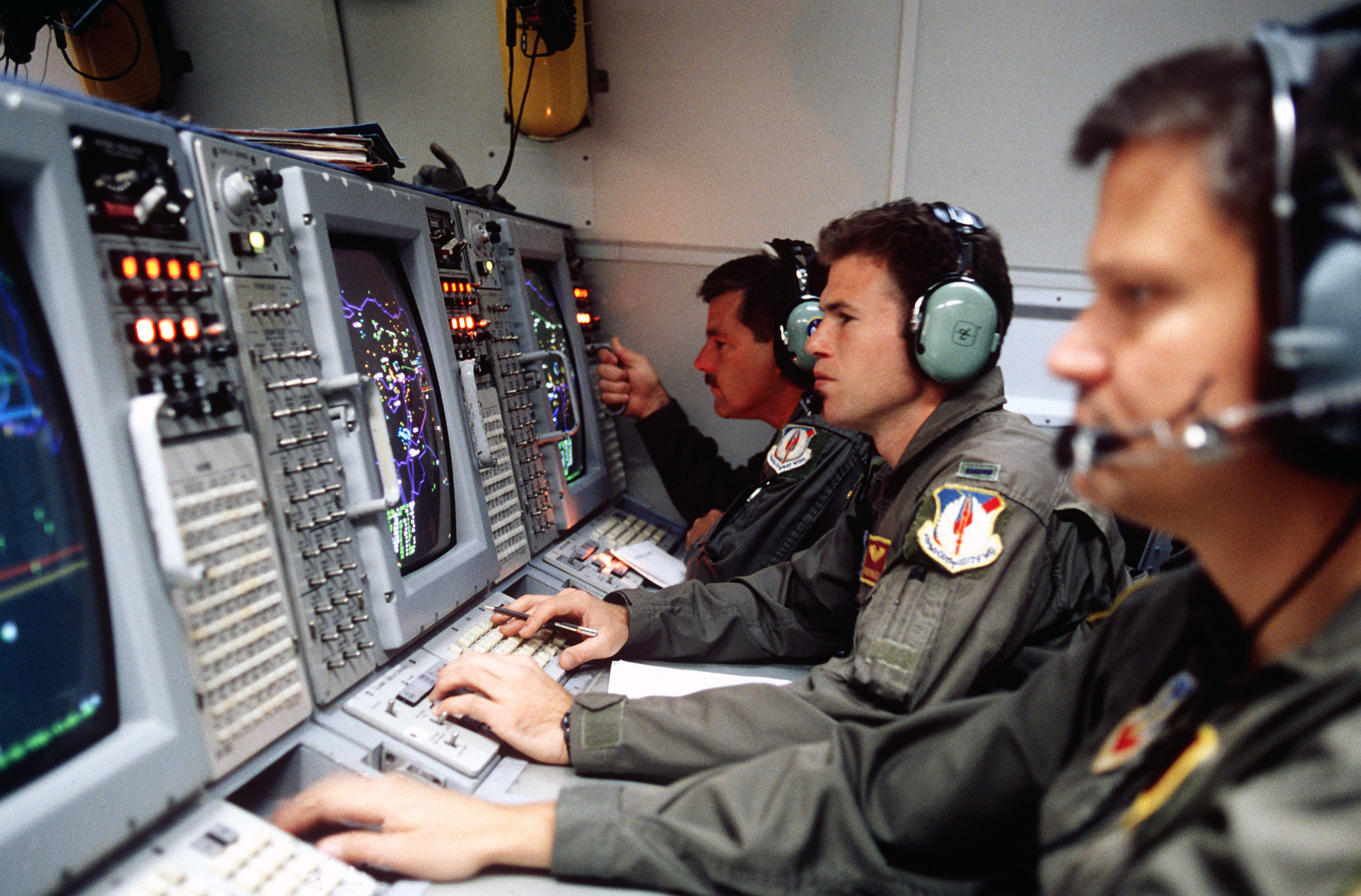
Air controllers aboard a US E-3 during Operation Provide Comfort in the mid 1990s

Other major subsystems in the E-3 Sentry are navigation, communications, and computers. 14 consoles display computer-processed data in graphic and tabular format on screens. Its operators perform surveillance, identification, weapons control, battle management and communications functions. Data may be forwarded in real-time to any major command and control center in rear areas or aboard ships. In times of crisis, data may also be forwarded to the National Command Authority in the U.S. via RC-135 or aircraft carrier task forces.

Electrical generators mounted in each of the E-3's four engines provide 1 megawatt of electrical power required by the aircraft's radars and electronics. Its pulse-Doppler radar has a range of more than 250 mi (400 km) for low-flying targets at its operating altitude, and the pulse (BTH) radar has a range of approximately 400 mi (650 km) for aircraft flying at medium to high altitudes. The radar, combined with a secondary surveillance radar (SSR) and electronic support measures (ESM), provides a look down capability, to detect, identify, and track low-flying aircraft, while eliminating ground clutter returns.

=== Upgrades ===
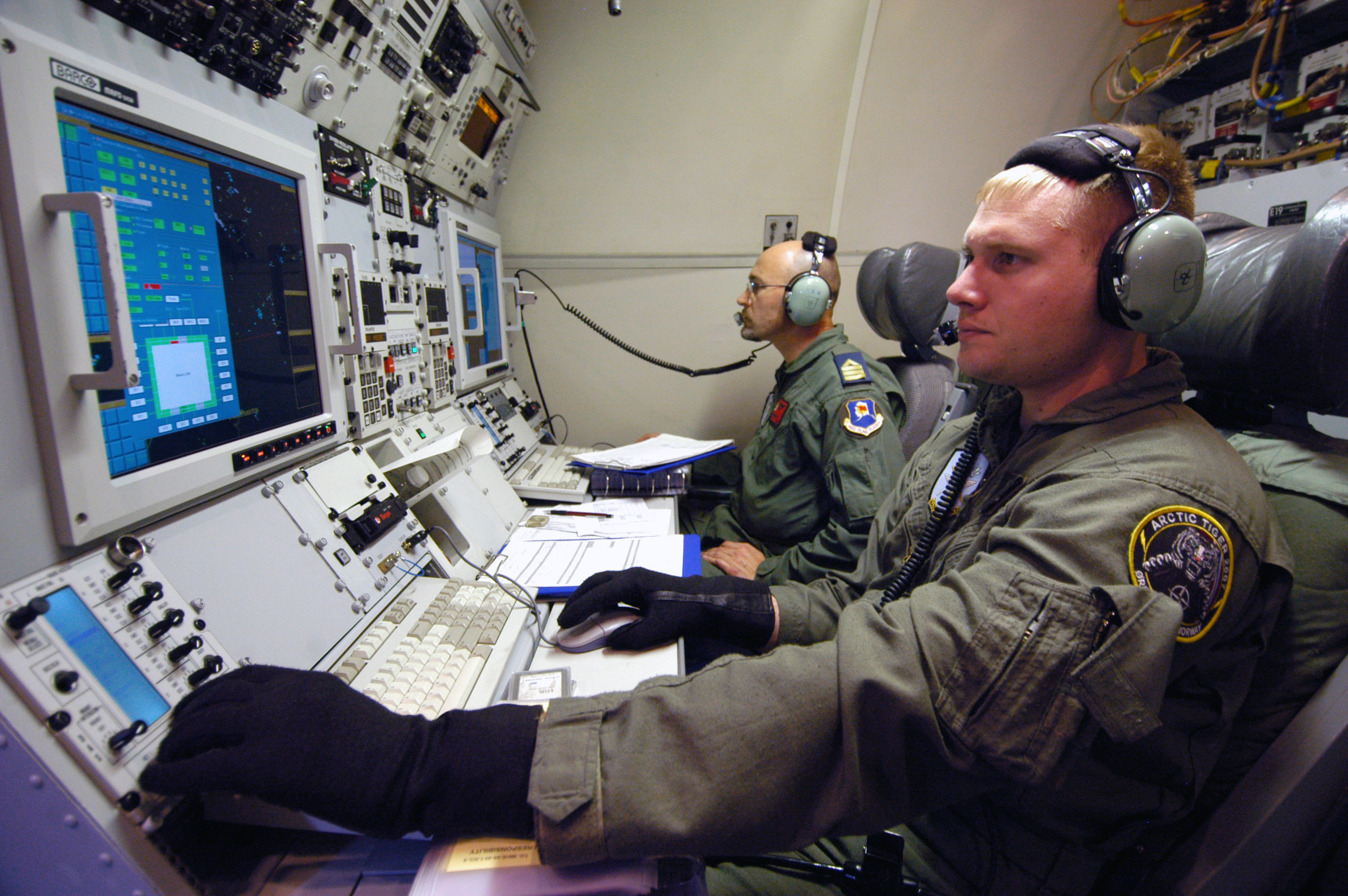
The command & comms consoles in 2008.

Between 1987 and 2001, USAF E-3s were upgraded under the "Block 30/35 Modification Program". Enhancements included:

- The installation of ESM and an electronic surveillance capability, for both active and passive means of detection.
- Installation of the Class 2H Joint Tactical Information Distribution System (JTIDS), which provides rapid and secure communication for transmitting information, including target positions and identification data, to other friendly platforms. This upgraded system allowed the Link 16 military tactical data link capability to be added as part of the Block 30/35 upgrade. Prior versions of the E-3 (NATO/US Standard and 20/25) had the Class 1 (Hughes) JTIDS system which was not Link 16 capable.
- Global Positioning System (GPS) capability was added.
- Onboard computers and software were overhauled to accommodate the JTIDS Class 2H, Link 16, the new ESM systems and to allow for future enhancements.

==== RSIP ====
The Radar System Improvement Program (RSIP) was a joint US/NATO development program. RSIP enhances the operational capability of the E-3 radars' electronic countermeasures, and improves the system's reliability, maintainability, and availability. Essentially, this program replaced the older transistor-transistor logic (TTL) and emitter-coupled logic (MECL) electronic components, long-since out of production, with off-the-shelf computers that utilised a High-level programming language instead of assembly language. Significant improvement came from adding pulse compression to the pulse-Doppler mode. These hardware and software modifications improve the E-3 radars' performance, providing enhanced detection with an emphasis towards low radar cross-section (RCS) targets.

The RAF also joined the USAF in adding RSIP to upgrade the E-3's radars. The retrofitting of the E-3 squadrons was completed in December 2000. Along with the RSIP upgrade was installation of the Global Positioning System/Inertial Navigation Systems which improved positioning accuracy. In 2002, Boeing was awarded a contract to add RSIP to the small French AWACS squadron. Installation was completed in 2006. Saudi Arabia began RSIP upgrades in 2013; the first aircraft being upgraded by Boeing in Seattle with the four remaining aircraft upgraded in Riyadh between 2014 and 2016.

==== NATO Mid Term Program ====
Between 2000 and 2008 NATO upgraded its E-3s to "Mid Term Program" (MTP) standard. This involved technical upgrades and a total multi-sensor-systems integration.

==== DRAGON ====
In 2009, the USAF, in cooperation with NATO, entered into a major flight deck avionics modernization program in order to maintain compliance with worldwide airspace mandates. The program, called DRAGON (for DMS Replacement of Avionics for Global Operation and Navigation), was awarded to Boeing and Rockwell Collins in 2010. Drawing on their Flight2 flight management system (FMS), almost all the avionics were replaced with more modern digital equipment from Rockwell Collins. Main upgrades include a Digital Audio Distribution System, Mode-5/ADS-B transponder, Inmarsat and VDL datalinks, and a terrain awareness and warning system (TAWS). The centerpiece flight deck hardware consists of five 6x8 color graphics displays and two color CDUs. DRAGON laid the foundation for subsequent upgrades including GPS M-Code, Iridium ATC, and Autopilot. USAF DRAGON Production began in 2018.

==== USAF Block 40/45 ====
In 2014 the USAF began upgrading block 30/35 E-3B/Cs into block 40/45 E-3Gs. This upgrade replaces the main flight computer with a Red Hat Linux-based system, as well as replacing the DOS 2.0-like operating system with a Windows 95-like system on the operator workstations. In 2016, a three-week long cybersecurity vulnerability test revealed the 40/45 block and its supporting ground equipment were vulnerable to cyber threats, and were thus deemed "not survivable." This caused a delay of approximately two years. 24 E-3s are projected to complete this upgrade to 40/45 by the end of fiscal year 2020, while seven aircraft will be retired to save upgrade costs and harvest out-of-production components.

==== NATO Final Lifetime Extension Program ====
NATO intends to extend the operational status of its AWACS until 2035 by significantly upgrading fourteen aircraft in the "Final Lifetime Extension Program" (FLEP) between 2019 and 2026. Upgrades include the expansion of data capacity, expansion of bandwidth for satellite communications, new encryption equipment, new HAVE QUICK radios, upgraded mission computing software and new operator consoles. The supporting ground systems (mission training center and mission planning and evaluation system) will also be upgraded to the latest standard. FLEP will be combined with the standard planned higher echelon technical maintenance.

== Operational history ==
=== United States ===
In March 1977 the 552nd Airborne Warning and Control Wing received the first E-3 aircraft at Tinker AFB in Oklahoma. In June 1984, the 34th and last USAF Sentry was delivered. The USAF has thirty E-3s in active service. 26 are stationed at Tinker AFB and belong to Air Combat Command (ACC). Four are assigned to the Pacific Air Forces (PACAF) and stationed at Kadena AB, Okinawa and Elmendorf AFB, Alaska. One aircraft (TS-3) was assigned to Boeing for testing and development, and retired/scrapped in June 2012.

E-3 Sentry aircraft were among the first to deploy during Operation Desert Shield, where they established a radar screen to monitor Iraqi forces. During Operation Desert Storm, E-3s flew 379 missions and logged 5,052 hours of on-station time. The data collection capability of the E-3 radar and computer subsystems allowed an entire air war to be recorded for the first time. In addition to providing senior leadership with time-critical information on the actions of enemy forces, E-3 controllers assisted in 38 of 41 air-to-air kills recorded during the conflict.

NATO, UK, French and USAF AWACS played an important role in the air campaign against Serbia and Montenegro in the former republic of FR Yugoslavia. From March to June 1999 the aircraft were deployed in the NATO bombing of Yugoslavia (Operation Allied Force), directing allied strike and air defence aircraft to and from their targets. Over 1,000 aircraft operating from bases in Germany and Italy took part in the air campaign to destroy Yugoslav air defenses and high-value targets such as bridges across the Danube river, factories, power stations, telecommunications facilities, and military installations.

In November 2015, an E-3G was deployed to the Middle East to fly combat missions in support of Operation Inherent Resolve against ISIL, marking the first combat deployment of the upgraded Block 40/45 aircraft.

Six out of 16 active E-3 aircraft were deployed to the Middle East as part of the 2026 Iran war. On 27 March 2026, an E-3G (serial number 81-0005) was destroyed by an Iranian drone and missile strike at Prince Sultan Air Base in Saudi Arabia. An unnamed U.S. official told NPR a second E-3 was also damaged.

It was reported in 2026 that the E-3 was expected to remain in US service until 2035.

=== United Kingdom ===
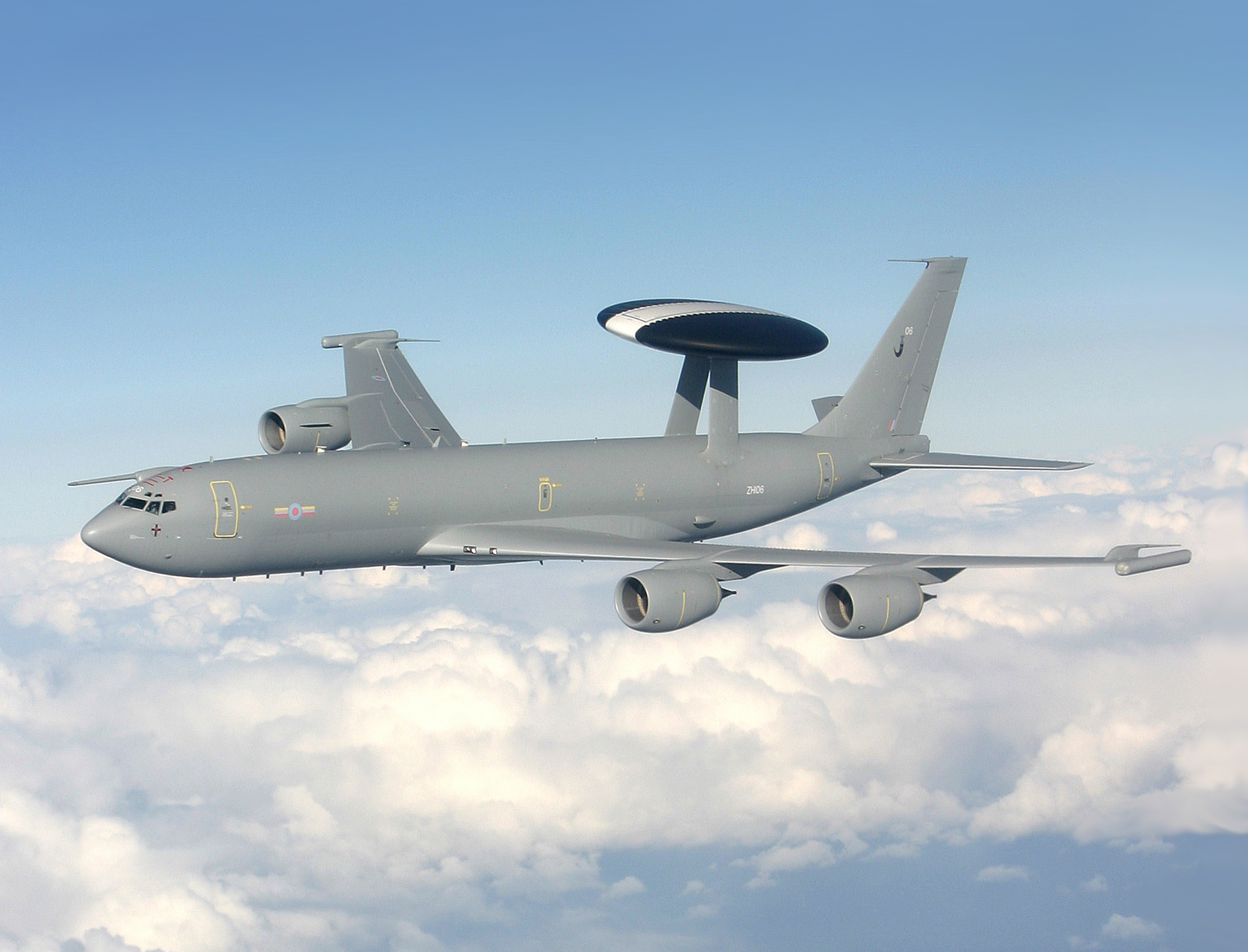
A Royal Air Force E-3 Sentry over North Yorkshire

In February 1987 the UK and France ordered E-3 aircraft in a joint project which saw deliveries start in 1991. The British requirement arose due to the cancellation of the BAE Nimrod AEW3 project. UK E-3Ds contributed to the NATO Airborne Early Warning and Control Force (NAEWCF), receiving much of their tasking directly from NATO. However, RAF E-3Ds remained UK-crewed and capable of independent, national tasking.

In 2009, the UK effectively limited the service life of the E-3D fleet by de-funding the Project Eagle upgrade, which would have upgraded it to the USAF Block 40/45 standard. AirForces Monthly reported that by December 2020, just 2 aircraft were available for operations at any one time. The Strategic Defence and Security Review 2015 announced the intention to retain the E-3D fleet until 2035.

In March 2019, the Ministry of Defence announced the E-3Ds would be replaced by five E-7 Wedgetails from 2023. The £1.51 billion contract was awarded to Boeing without a competitive procurement process, a decision criticised by both competitors of Boeing and the UK's Defence Select Committee. The 2021 Integrated Defence Review confirmed a reduced order of three aircraft.

On 27 January 2015, the RAF deployed an E-3D Sentry to Cyprus in support of US-led coalition airstrikes against Islamic State militants in Iraq and Syria. The last operational flight by an RAF Sentry was in July 2021; the aircraft was subsequently withdrawn from service.

=== France ===
In February 1987 the UK and France ordered E-3 aircraft in a joint project which saw deliveries start in 1991. France operates its E-3F aircraft independently of NATO. France operates four aircraft, all fitted with the newer CFM56-2 engines.

In December 2025, France ordered two Swedish Saab GlobalEye to replace its AWACS aircraft. The order includes the option for two additional aircraft; deliveries are due between 2029-2032.

=== Chile ===
Three Boeing E-3D Sentry (Sentry AEW.1) aircraft, acquired second hand from the United Kingdom in September 2021, arrived in Chile in July 2022. Units ZH103 and ZH106 will join the "Grupo de Aviación N.º 10" of the II Air Brigade. The other E-3D will reportedly be used as a source of spare parts.

=== NATO ===
NATO acquired 18 E-3As and support equipment, with the first aircraft delivered in January 1982. The aircraft are registered in Luxembourg. These E-3s were operated by Number 1, 2 and 3 Squadrons of NATO's E-3 Component, based at NATO Air Base Geilenkirchen in Germany.

NATO E-3s participated in Operation Eagle Assist after the September 11 attacks on the World Trade Center towers and the Pentagon. NATO and RAF E-3s participated in the 2011 military intervention in Libya.

From January 2011 to September 2014, NATO E-3s were deployed to Mazar-i-Sharif International Airport, Afghanistan, as part of NATO's International Security Assistance Force (ISAF) mission. The aircraft were used for air traffic control of military aircraft over Afghanistan, as well as surveillance, and tactical management of friendly aircraft. During the mission to Afghanistan, NATO E-3s flew 1,240 missions and accumulated 12,240 flying hours.

Presently, 14 NATO E-3As are in the inventory, since one E-3 was lost in a crash and three were retired from service in 2015, 2017, and 2018. The first was due for its six-year cycle Depot Level Maintenance (DLM) inspection which would have been very costly. The "449 Retirement Project" resulted in reclamation of critical parts with a value of upwards of $40 million, which will be used to support the remaining active aircraft. Some of the parts to be removed are no longer on the market or have become very expensive.

== Variants ==
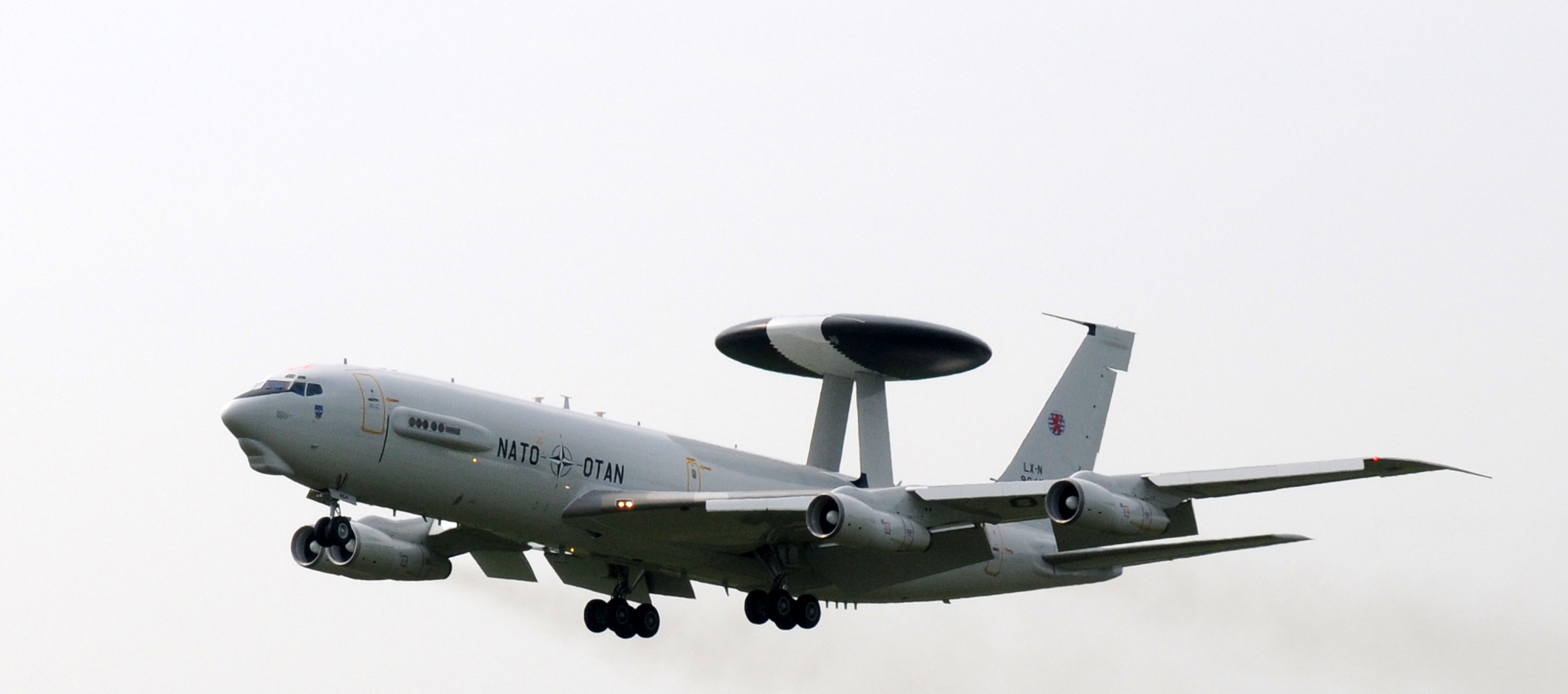
NATO E-3s possess LX tail registration, as they are registered in Luxembourg. The chin bulge houses a suite of electronic warfare support measures.

EC-137D
Two prototype AWACS aircraft with JT3D engines, 1 fitted with a Westinghouse Electric radar and 1 with a Hughes Aircraft Company radar. Both converted to E-3A standard with TF33 engines.
E-3A
Production aircraft with TF33 engines and AN/APY-1 radar, 24 built for USAF (later converted to E-3B standard), total of 34 ordered but the last 9 completed as E-3C. One additional aircraft retained by Boeing for testing, 18 built for NATO with TF33 engines and 5 for Saudi Arabia with CFM56 engines.
KE-3A
These are not AWACS aircraft but CFM56 powered tankers based on the E-3 design. 8 were sold to Saudi Arabia.
RE-3A
Three KE-3 airframes delivered as CFM56–powered strategic reconnaissance aircraft. Systems and external appearance are similar to the USAF’s RC-135V/W Rivet Joint platform. At least one of the RE-3As has received the extended "hog nose" as fitted to the RC-135.
E-3B
USAF Block 30 modification. E-3As with improvements, 24 conversions.
E-3C
USAF Block 35 modification. Production aircraft with AN/APY-2 radar, additional electronic consoles and system improvements, ten built.
JE-3C
One E-3A aircraft used by Boeing for trials later redesignated E-3C.
E-3D
Production aircraft for the RAF to E-3C standard with CFM56 engines and British modifications designated Sentry AEW.1, 7 built. Modifications included the addition of a refueling probe next to the existing boom AAR receptacle, CFM-56 engines, wingtip ESM pods, an enhanced Maritime Surveillance Capability (MSC) offering Maritime Scan-Scan Processing (MSSP), JTIDS and Havequick 2 radios.
E-3F
Production aircraft for the French Air and Space Force to E-3C standard with CFM56 engines and French modifications, four built.
E-3G
USAF Block 40/45 modification. Includes hardware and software upgrades to improve communications, computer processing power, threat tracking, and others, and automates some previously manual functions. Initial operating capability (IOC) declared in July 2014. It also removed the 1970 vintage mission computing. E-3G(II) Block 40/45 modification that included a glass cockpit modification that reduced the crew size by one, and added a new avionics suite.

== Operators ==
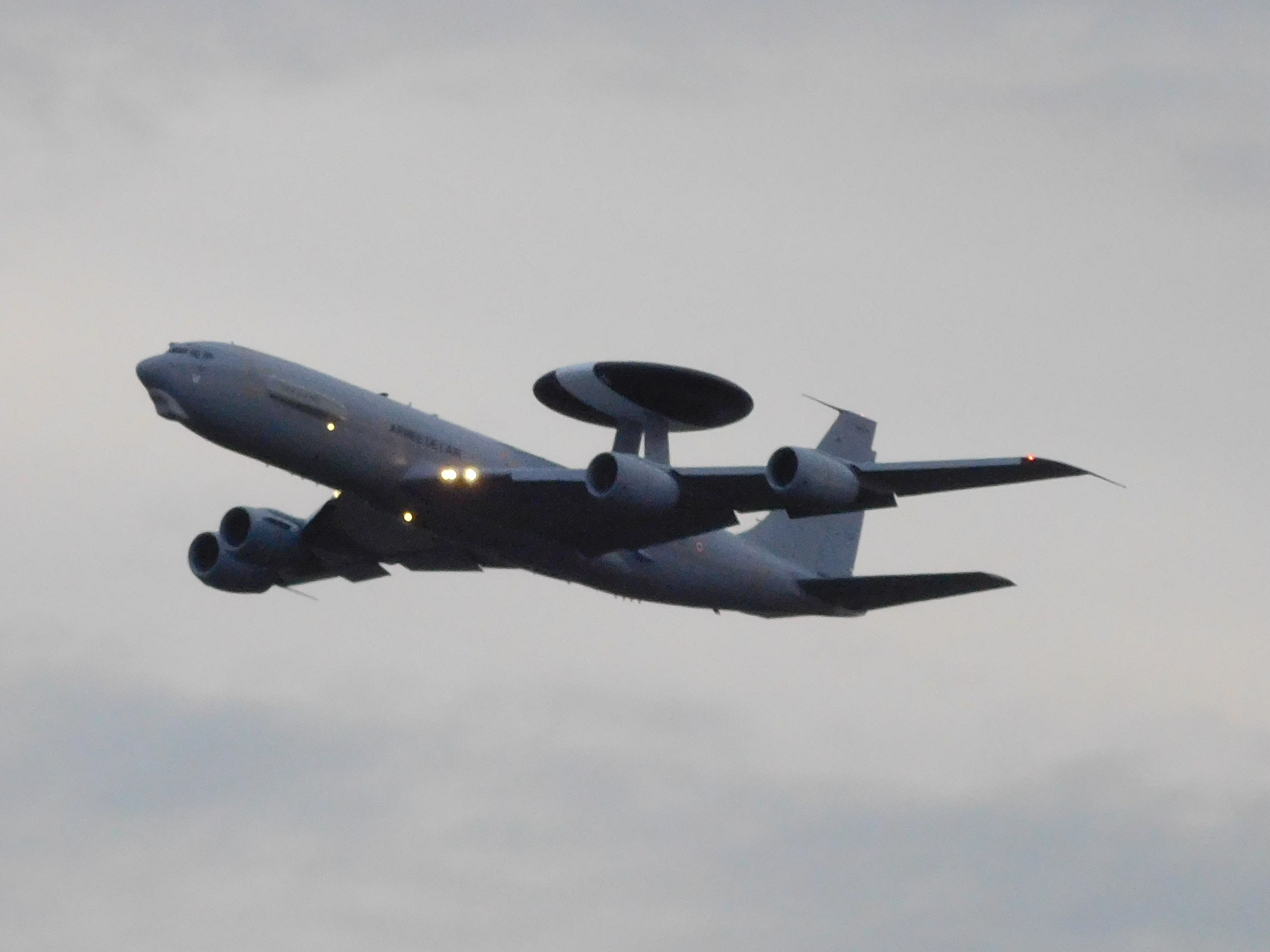
Boeing E-3F Sentry of the French Air and Space Force

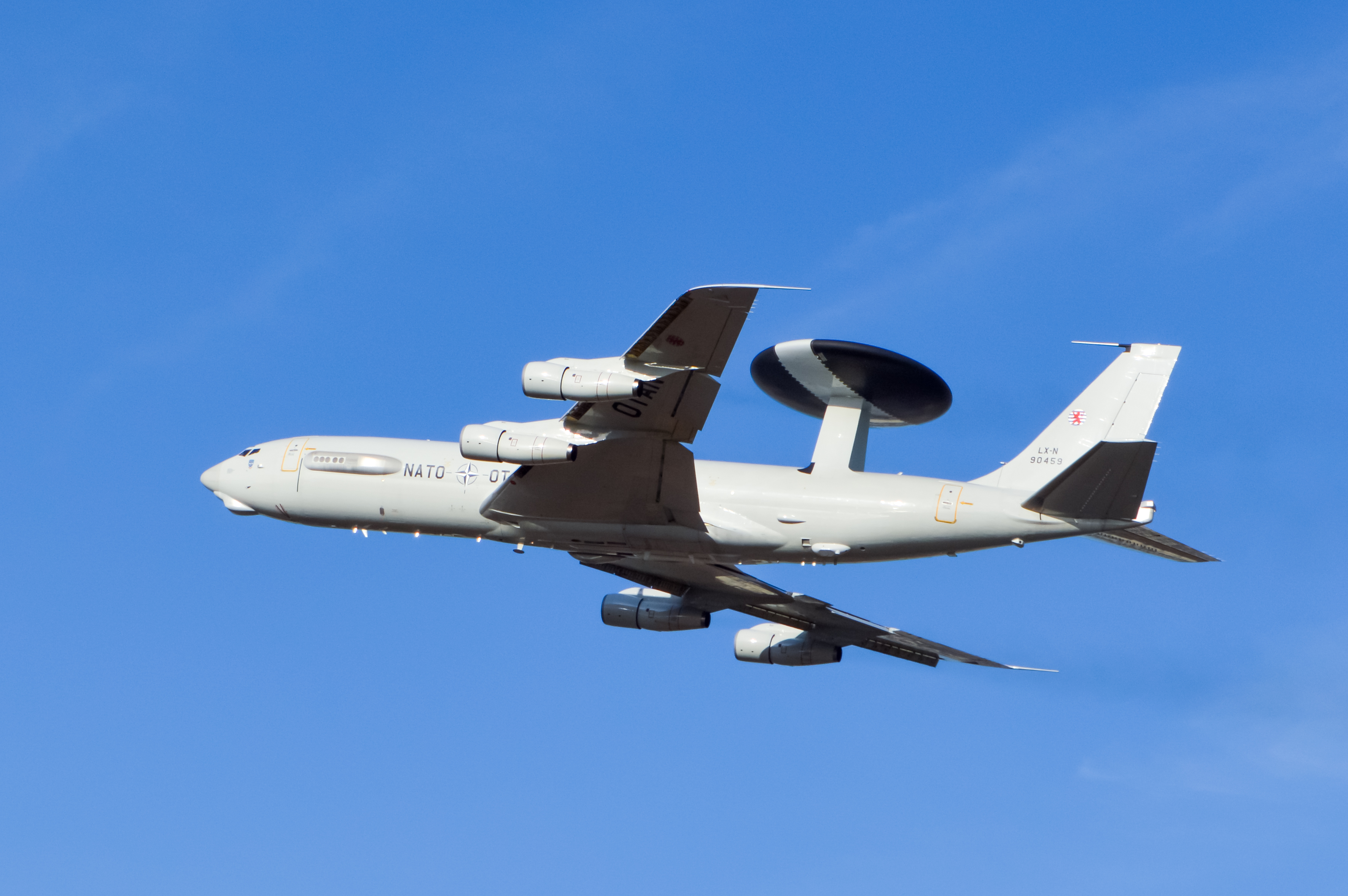
Boeing E-3A Sentry of the NATO E-3A Component

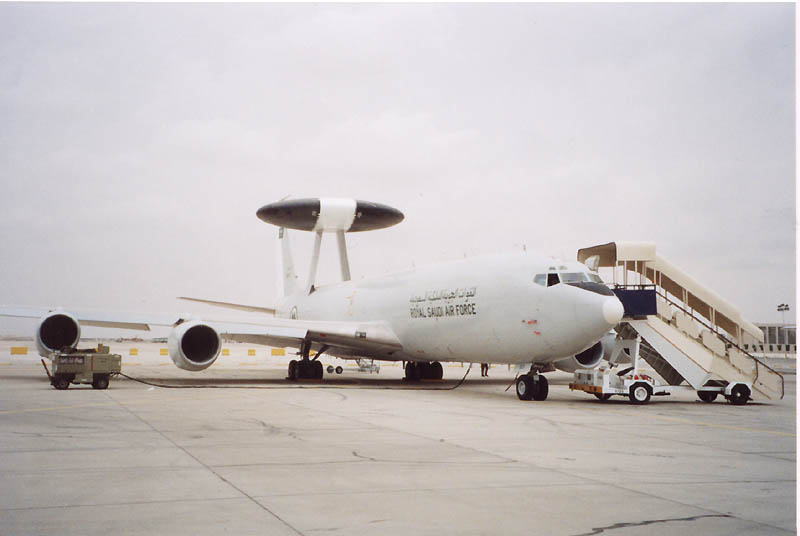
Boeing E-3A Sentry of the Royal Saudi Air Force

Chile
The Chilean Air Force purchased three retired E-3D Sentry aircraft from the Royal Air Force.

France
The French Air and Space Force purchased four E-3F aircraft.

- Escadron de détection et de contrôle aéroportés 36 Berry (36th Airborne Detection and Control Squadron "Berry") based at Avord Air Base.

NATO
18 E-3 AWACS were purchased – 1 was written off in Greece, 3 were retired from service. Mainly responsible for monitoring European NATO airspace, they have also been deployed outside the area in support of NATO commitments. The 20 multinational crews are provided by 15 of 31 NATO member states.

- NATO Airborne Early Warning and Control Force – E-3A Component. 3 Boeing E-3 Sentries are based at Geilenkirchen (Germany), with forward operating bases at Konya (Turkey), Preveza/Aktion (Greece) and Trapani/Birgi (Italy) and a forward operating location at Ørland (Norway).
  - Aircrew Training Squadron
  - Flying Squadron 1
  - Flying Squadron 2
  - Flying Squadron 3 – disbanded in 2015

Saudi Arabia
The Royal Saudi Air Force purchased five E-3A aircraft in 1983. In 2004, modifications began to convert KE-3A tankers into RE-3 electronic intelligence gathering aircraft.

- RSAF No. 6 Wing (Prince Sultan Air Base – Al Kharj)

No. 18 Squadron
No. 19 Squadron – RE-3A/B (as well as Beechcraft 350ER-ISR)
No. 23 Squadron – KE-3A

United States
The United States Air Force has 14 operational E-3s as of March 2026.
Tactical Air Command 1976–1992
Air Combat Command 1992–present

- 552d Air Control Wing – Tinker Air Force Base, Oklahoma

960th Airborne Air Control Squadron 2001–present (NAS Keflavik, Iceland 1979–1992)
963d Airborne Air Control Squadron 1976–present
964th Airborne Air Control Squadron 1977–present
965th Airborne Air Control Squadron 1978–1979, 1984–present
966th Airborne Air Control Squadron 1976–present

- 380th Air Expeditionary Wing 2002–present Al Dhafra Air Base, United Arab Emirates

968th Expeditionary Airborne Air Control Squadron 2013–present (Thumrait Air Base, Oman 2002–2003)

Air Force Reserve Command

- 513th Air Control Group (Associate) – Tinker AFB, Oklahoma

970th Airborne Air Control Squadron 1996–present (Personnel only, aircraft loaned by co-located 552nd ACW as needed)

- 413th Flight Test Group – Robins AFB, Georgia

10th Flight Test Squadron – Tinker AFB, Oklahoma 1994–present

Pacific Air Forces

- 3d Wing – Elmendorf AFB, Alaska

962d Airborne Air Control Squadron 1986–present

- 18th Wing – Kadena AB, Japan

961st Airborne Air Control Squadron 1979–present

=== Former operators ===
United Kingdom
The Royal Air Force purchased seven E-3Ds by October 1987, designated Sentry AEW.1 in British service. In December 2020, three remained in service after one was withdrawn from service in 2009 to be used as spares, two were withdrawn in March 2019 and a further one withdrawn in January 2020. The fleet was given an out of service date (OSD) of December 2022. They formed the E-3D Component of the NATO Airborne Early Warning and Control Force. That date was accelerated pursuant to the 2021 defence review and the aircraft made its final flight in U.K. service in August 2021.

- RAF Waddington, Lincolnshire, England

No. 8 Squadron (1991–2021)
No. 23 Squadron (1996–2009)
No. 54 Squadron (Operational Conversion Unit 2005–?)
No. 56 Squadron (Operational Evaluation Unit 2008–?)

== Accidents and notable incidents ==
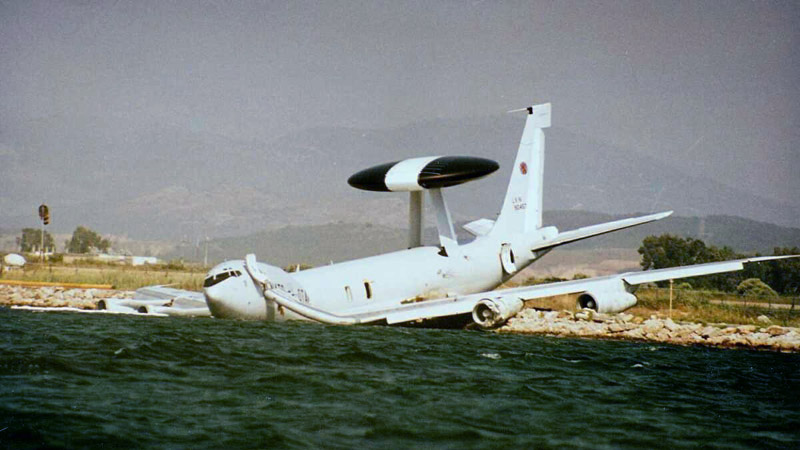
LX-N90457, after having overrun the runway at Preveza AB on 14 July 1996

E-3s have been involved in five hull-loss incidents, and one radar antenna was destroyed during RSIP development (see photo under Avionics).

- On 22 September 1995, U.S. Air Force E-3 Sentry (callsign Yukla 27, serial number 77-0354), crashed shortly after takeoff from Elmendorf AFB, Alaska. The plane lost power to both left side engines after ingesting several Canada geese during takeoff. The aircraft went down about 2 miles (3.2 km) northeast of the runway, killing all 24 crew members on board.
- On 14 July 1996, a NATO E-3 Sentry, tail number LX-N90457, overran the runway and crashed into a sea wall at Preveza-Aktion Airport in Greece when the pilot attempted to abort takeoff after mistakenly believing the aircraft had suffered a bird strike. The aircraft overran the runway and struck a sea wall, where it came to a halt. There were no injuries and the aircraft was written off. Investigators could find no evidence that a bird strike and ingestion had occurred.
- On 28 August 2009, U.S. Air Force E-3C Sentry, serial number 83-0008 participating in a Red Flag exercise at Nellis Air Force Base, Nevada experienced a nose gear collapse on landing, resulting in a fire and damaging the aircraft beyond repair. All 32 crew members evacuated safely.
- On 27 March 2026, during the 2026 Iran war, a U.S Air Force E-3G, serial number 81-0005, was destroyed on the ground at Prince Sultan Air Base in Saudi Arabia. The attack was reportedly an Iranian drone and missile strike. A second E-3 was also damaged.

== Specifications (USAF/NATO) ==
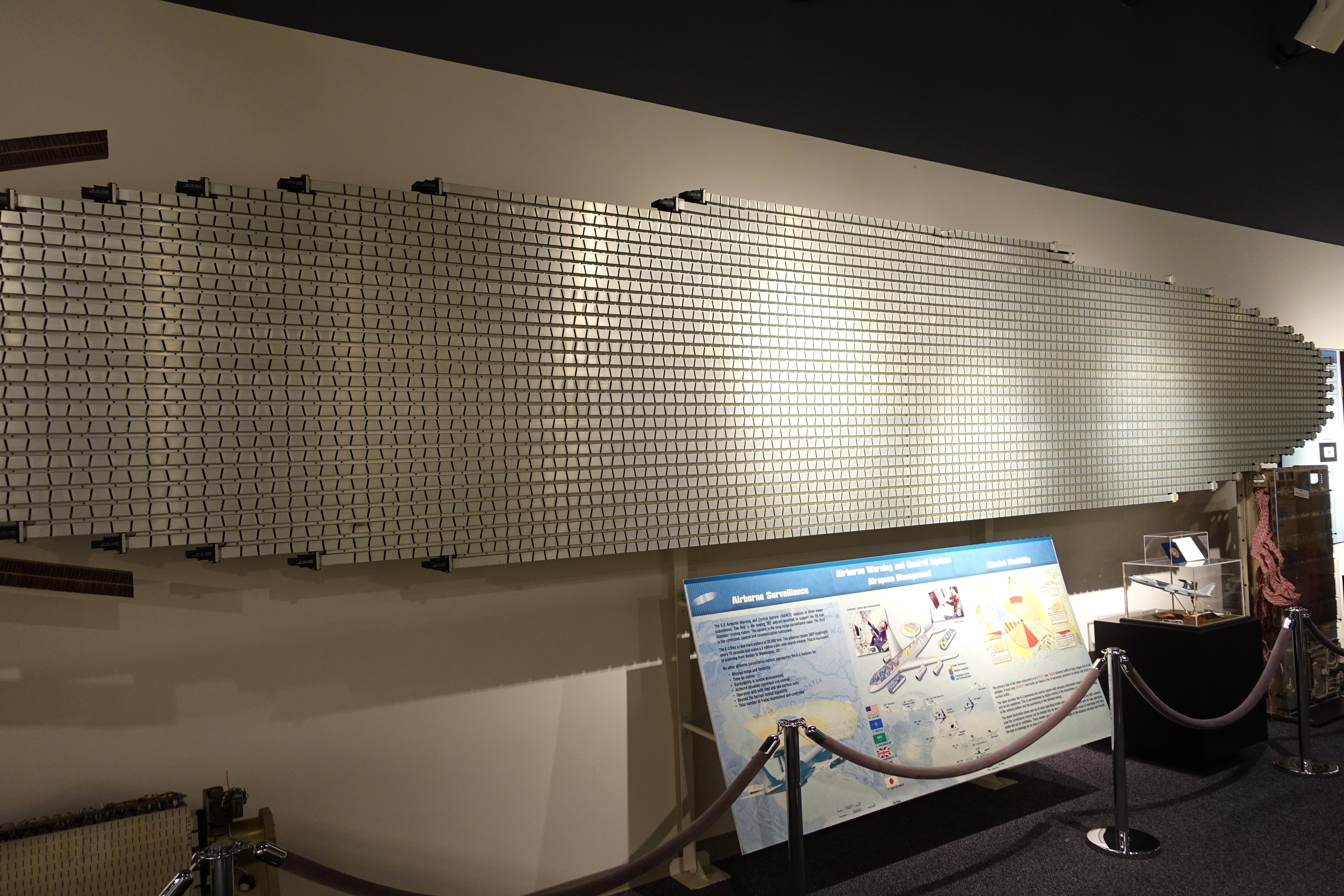
AN/APY-1 antenna array in the National Electronics Museum

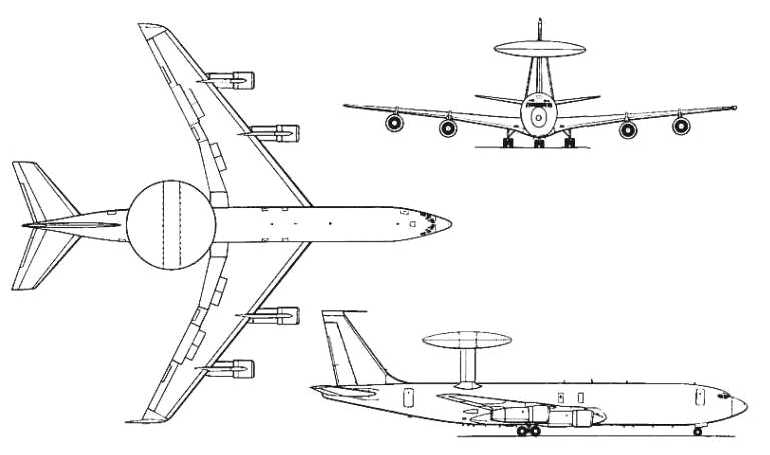

Data from E-3 Sentry (AWACS)

General characteristics

- Crew: Flight crew: 4 (aircraft commander, pilot, navigator, flight engineer); Mission crew: 13–19
- Length: 152 ft 11 in (46.61 m)
- Wingspan: 145 ft 9 in (44.42 m)
- Height: 41 ft 4 in (12.60 m)
- Wing area: 3,050 sq ft (283 m^{2})
- Empty weight: 185,000 lb (83,915 kg)
- Gross weight: 344,000 lb (156,036 kg)
- Max takeoff weight: 347,000 lb (157,397 kg)
- Powerplant: 4 × Pratt and Whitney TF33-PW-100A turbofan, 21,500 lbf (96 kN) thrust each

Performance

- Maximum speed: 461 kn (531 mph, 854 km/h)
- Cruise speed: 310 kn (360 mph, 580 km/h) optimum
- Range: 4,000 nmi (4,600 mi, 7,400 km)
- Endurance: more than 8 hours without refuelling (about 11 hours with CFM56 engine)
- Service ceiling: 29,000 ft (8,800 m) minimum

Avionics

- AN/APS-133 colour weather radar
- Westinghouse Corporation AN/APY-1 or AN/APY-2 passive electronically scanned array radar system

== See also ==
Related development

- Boeing CT-49
- Boeing E-767 – essentially the E-3's systems in a Boeing 767 airframe
- Boeing P-8 Poseidon
- Boeing KC-135 Stratotanker

Aircraft of comparable role, configuration, and era

- Beriev A-50
- Beriev A-100
- Boeing 737 AEW&C (E-7 Wedgetail)
- EL/M-2075
- KJ-2000
- Northrop Grumman E-2 Hawkeye
- Northrop Grumman E-8 Joint STARS

Related lists

- List of active United Kingdom military aircraft
- List of active United States military aircraft
- List of military electronics of the United States
