= No. 8 Squadron RSAF =

- Active: 1970s-present
- Country: Saudi Arabia
- Branch: Royal Saudi Air Force
- Type: Squadron
- Part of: RSAF 1 Wing
- Base: King Faisal Air Academy, Majmaah
- Aircraft: Cirrus SR22T; PAC MFI-395 Super Mushshak

No. 8 Squadron RSAF is a squadron of the Royal Saudi Air Force that operates the Cirrus SR22T and PAC MFI-395 Super Mushshak at King Faisal Air Academy, Majmaah, Riyadh Province in Saudi Arabia as part of RSAF 1 Wing.

It used to fly the Cessna 172G/H/M at Riyadh.
