= No. 71 Squadron RSAF =

No. 71 Squadron RSAF No. 71 Squadron (OCU) RSAF
- Active: Unknown-present
- Country: Saudi Arabia
- Branch: Royal Saudi Air Force
- Type: Squadron
- Role: Operational Conversion Unit
- Part of: RSAF 6 Wing
- Base: Prince Sultan Air Base, Al-Kharj
- Aircraft: Various

No. 71 Squadron RSAF is a squadron of the Royal Saudi Air Force that operates various aircraft at Prince Sultan Air Base, Al-Kharj, Riyadh Province in Saudi Arabia within RSAF 6 Wing.
