= Royal Saudi Air Force =

Air warfare branch of Saudi Arabia's military

- القوات الجوية الملكية السعودية
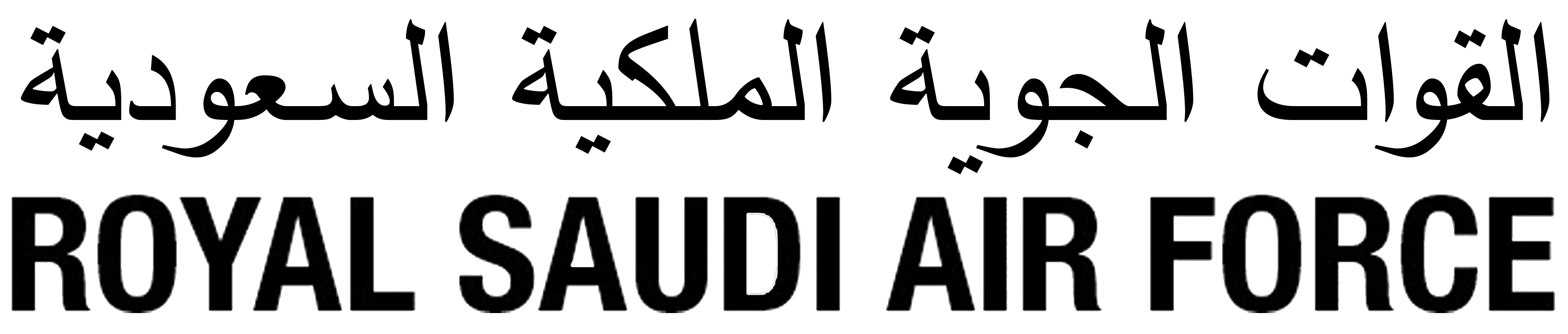
- Emblem and logo of the Royal Saudi Air Force
- Founded: 1916; 110 years ago (Hejaz Air Force); 1926; 100 years ago (Hejaz–Nejd Air Force); 1952; 74 years ago (Royal Saudi Air Force)
- Country: Kingdom of Hejaz (1916–1925); Kingdom of Hejaz and Nejd (1926–1932); Kingdom of Saudi Arabia (1932–present)
- Type: Air force
- Role: Aerial warfare
- Size: 30,000 personnel 917 total aircraft
- Part of: Saudi Arabian Armed Forces
- Nickname: Saudi Falcons
- Motto: "الله أكبر"; God is the greatest
- Engagements: World War I; Arab Revolt; Unification of Saudi Arabia; Hejaz–Nejd War; Saudi–Yemeni War; Arab Cold War; Al-Wadiah War; Iran–Iraq War; Al-Arabiya Island incident; Gulf War; Battle of Khafji; Syrian Civil War; War against ISIS; Yemeni Civil War; Houthi–Saudi conflict; Saudi-led intervention in the Yemeni civil war; Southern Yemen campaign; 2026 Yemen offensives; 2026 Iran war; Saudi Arabia in the 2026 Iran war
- Website: Official website

Commanders
- Commander-in-chief: King Salman
- Chairman of the General Staff: Air Chief Marshal Fayyadh Al-Ruwaili
- Minister of Defense: Khalid bin Salman
- Commander of the Royal Air Force: Lieutenant General Turki bin Bandar

Insignia
- Flag

- Roundel

- Low Visibility roundel

Aircraft flown
- Electronic warfare: E-3 Sentry, Saab 2000 AEW&C
- Fighter: Panavia Tornado, Eurofighter Typhoon, F-15C/D, F-15S/SA
- Helicopter: Bell 412, AS532, UH-60
- Reconnaissance: Panavia Tornado, King Air 350
- Trainer: Pilatus PC-21A, PAC MFI-395, Cirrus SR22, BAE Hawk
- Transport: C-130H, C-130J, Airbus A330 MRTT

The Royal Saudi Air Force (RSAF) (Note: (Arabic: القوات الجوية الملكية السعودية, romanized: al-Qūwāt al-Jawwīyah al-Malakīyah al-Saʻūdīyah)) is the air force of Saudi Arabia and one of the principal branches of the Saudi Arabian Armed Forces. Its origins date to 1916, when the Hejaz Air Force was established during World War I. It operates alongside the Royal Saudi Air Defense Forces, a separate service responsible for air defense.

The Royal Saudi Air Force currently has wings, squadrons, and a special forces unit dedicated to combat search and rescue. It has developed from a largely defensive military force into one with an advanced offensive capability, beginning in the 1990s with the acquisition of laser-guided bombs and unguided bombs.

The backbone of the RSAF is the F-15 family, including the advanced F-15SA variant; it maintains the second largest fleet of F-15 Eagles after the U.S. Air Force. The RSAF also operates the Eurofighter Typhoon, acquired under the Al-Salam agreement with BAE Systems. Many earlier aircraft were delivered under the Al-Yamamah contracts with British Aerospace (now BAE Systems).

== History ==
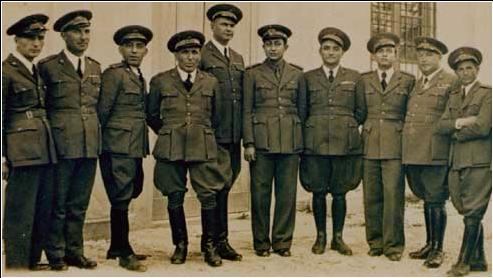
"The Saudi pilots training in Italy 1935"—a scene from 'Our Eagles', one of four video wall shows made for the Royal Saudi Air Force Museum.

The Royal Saudi Air Force was formed in the mid-1920s with British assistance from the remains of the Hejaz Air Force. It was initially equipped with Westland Wapiti IIA general purpose aircraft flown by pilots who had served Ali of Hejaz but had been pardoned by the King Abdulaziz.

Following a contract with the British government, which was concluded in 1937, a military airstrip at Jeddah was established in 1939. The military airstrip was where the Air Force was stationed. In 1949, a group of aviation students were sent to study in England, after completing training at Al-Houba. By 1950, a second group of students were sent. The Air Force was re-organized in 1950 and began to receive American assistance from 1952 including the use of King Abdulaziz Air Base by the United States Air Force. In 1951, the group of aviation students returned to form the Royal Saudi Air Force. On November 5, 1952, the Air Force's flag was raised at a military hangar in Jeddah Airport, which was attended by Prince Mishaal bin Abdulaziz, Minister of Defense and Aviation at the time. Shortly afterwards, Air Force schools begun opening around the kingdom. Early aircraft used by the RSAF included the Caproni Ca.100, Albatros D.III, Armstrong Whitworth F.K.8, Farman MF.11 Airco DH.9, dH 82 Tiger Moth, Westland Wapiti, Avro Anson, Douglas C-47, and the Douglas A-26 Invader. . In 1957, the Royal Saudi Air Force began major developments, including the establishments of 5 Squadrons, all based at Jeddah Airport. The transportation squadron was equipped with Douglas C-54 Skymasters and Fokker S-13s. The No.2 Squadron was equipped with Douglas B-26 Invaders and the No.5 Squadron was equipped with 20 De Havilland Vampires.

As part of the Magic Carpet arms deal between the United Kingdom and Saudi Arabia, four single-seat Hawker Hunter F.6s and two Hunter T.7s were gifted by Britain to Saudi Arabia. The aircraft were delivered to No. 6 Squadron at Khamis Mushayt Airbase in May 1966. The Hunters were operational, but Saudi Arabia knew that against the Egyptian Air Force the Hunters would not be successful as interceptors as they lacked any warning radar. They were used for ground attack primarily against Yemeni rebel forces. One single-seat aircraft was lost in 1967 and the remaining aircraft were gifted to Jordan in 1968.

The Saudi forces are equipped with mainly western equipment. Main suppliers to the RSAF are companies based in the United Kingdom and the United States. Both the UK and the US are involved in training programs conducted in Saudi Arabia.

During the 1980s and 1990s, the armed forces of Saudi Arabia were relatively small by Middle Eastern standards. Its strength however was derived from advanced technology. The backbone of the strike / ground attack force is formed by ca 70 Tornados (a second batch of 48 Tornado IDS were ordered in 1993 under the Al-Yamamah II program), and 72 F-15S aircraft delivered from the mid-1990s that operate beside the remnants of more than 120 F-15C/D aircraft delivered starting in 1981. Pilot training is executed on the Pilatus PC-21 and BAE Systems Hawk. The C-130 Hercules is the mainstay of the transport fleet and is assisted by CN-235s and Beechcraft Super King Air light transports. Reconnaissance is performed by Tornadoes and F-15s equipped with the DJRP electro-optical reconnaissance pod. The Boeing E-3A is the Airborne Early Warning platform operated by No. 18 Squadron RSAF.

The VIP support fleet consists of a wide variety of civil registered aircraft such as the Airbus A330, Airbus A320 family, 737 and 747, Lockheed Tri-Stars, MD11s and G1159A as well as Lockheed L-100-30. The HZ- prefix used in the civilian registrations of these aircraft derived from the former name of the territory (Hejaz).

From 1989 to 1991 three Lockheed C-130 Hercules of the RSAF were destroyed in accidents.

The September 1991 issue of Air Forces Monthly lists Nos 1, 3, 4, 5, 6, 7 (Tornado IDS), 8, 9, 10, 12, 13, 14, 15, 16, 17, 18, 21, 22, 29 Squadron (Dhahran with Tornado ADVs); 34, 37, 42, and 66 Squadrons.

=== Purchases and other activities in the 21st century ===
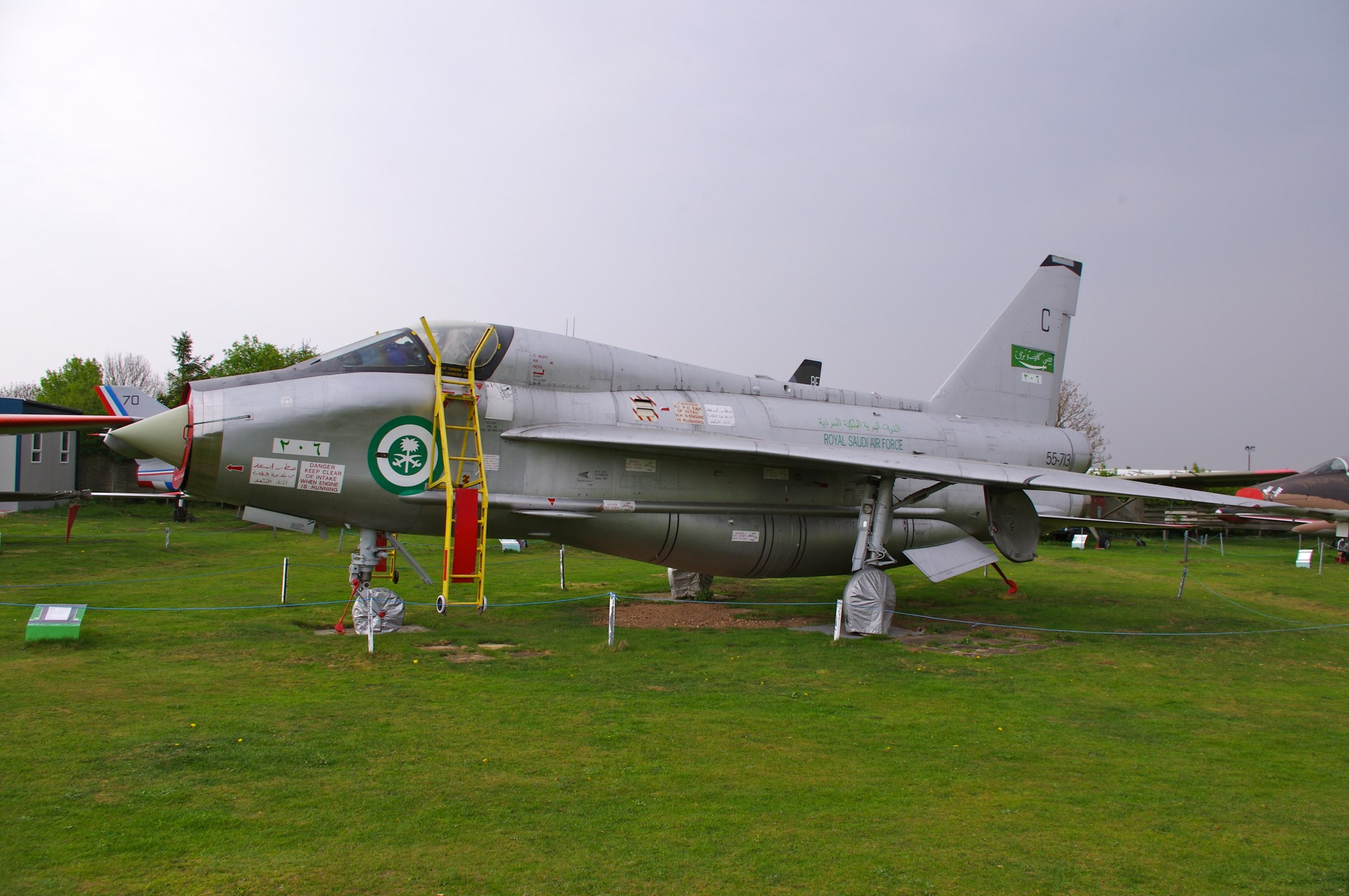
SAF Roundel on the side of a Lightning Aircraft

The Al-Yamamah contract was controversial because of the alleged bribes associated with its award. Nonetheless, the RSAF announced its intention to purchase the Typhoon from BAE Systems in December 2005. On 18 August 2006, a memorandum of understanding was signed for 72 aircraft in a GB£6–10 billion deal. The Eurofighter Typhoon was part of a multinational collaborative program having included a consortium of several companies from Spain, Germany and France, with the latter having left the program and later created the Rafale through Dassault Aviation. Following this order, the investigation of the Al-Yamamah contract was suppressed by the British prime minister Tony Blair in December 2006, citing "strategic interests" of the UK. On 17 September 2007 Saudi Arabia announced it had signed a £4.4bn deal with BAE Systems for 72 Typhoons.

On 29 December 2011, the United States signed a $29.4 billion deal to sell 84 F-15s in the SA (Saudi Advanced) configuration. The sale includes upgrades for the older F-15s up to the SA standard and related equipment and services.

On 23 May 2012, the British defence firm BAE Systems agreed to sell 22 BAE Systems Hawk advanced jet trainer aircraft to the Royal Saudi Air Force for a total of £1.9 billion ($3 billion). The deal also included simulators, ground and training equipment and spares. In April 2013, BAE Systems delivered the first two new Typhoons of 24 to Saudi Arabia.

In 2013, the USAF tendered an offer for security services to protect the Saudi air force from cyberwarfare attacks.

In March and April 2021, the RSAF participated alongside the Pakistani and US air forces in the ACES Meet 2021-1 exercise in Pakistan. The exercise concluded on 9 April.

== Structure ==
=== Wings ===
As of 2025, the RSAF is divided into multiple wings that are dispersed across nine air bases:

Emblem	Wing	Location	Squadrons	Notes
Active
	RSAF Wing 1	King Faisal Air Academy	No. 8 Squadron RSAF; No. 9 Squadron RSAF; No. 22 Squadron RSAF; No. 77 Squadron RSAF	
	RSAF Wing 2	King Fahd Air Base, Taif, Mecca Province	No. 3 Squadron RSAF; No. 10 Squadron RSAF; No. 80 Squadron RSAF	
	RSAF Wing 3	King Abdulaziz Air Base, Dhahran, Eastern Province	No. 13 Squadron RSAF	
	RSAF Wing 4	Prince Sultan Air Base, Al-Kharj, Riyadh Province	No. 23 Squadron RSAF; No. 24 Squadron RSAF; No. 32 Squadron RSAF	
	RSAF Wing 5	King Khalid Air Base, Khamis Mushait, Asir Province	No. 6 Squadron RSAF; No. 55 Squadron RSAF; No. 66 Squadron RSAF; No. 99 Squadron RSAF	
	RSAF Wing 6	Prince Sultan Air Base, Al-Kharj, Riyadh Province	No. 18 Squadron RSAF; No. 19 Squadron RSAF; No. 71 Squadron RSAF	
	RSAF Wing 7	King Faisal Air Base, Tabuk, Tabuk Province	No. 2 Squadron RSAF; No. 25 Squadron RSAF; No. 29 Squadron RSAF; No. 88 Squadron RSAF	
	RSAF Wing 8	King Abdullah Air Base, Jeddah, Mecca Province	No. 4 Squadron RSAF; No. 16 Squadron RSAF; No. 20 Squadron RSAF	
	RSAF Wing 9	King Fahd Air Base, Taif, Mecca Province	No. 14 Squadron RSAF; No. 33 Squadron RSAF; No. 44 Squadron RSAF	
	RSAF Wing 10	King Fahd Air Base, Taif, Mecca Province	No. 5 Squadron RSAF; No. 34 Squadron RSAF; No. 94 Squadron RSAF	
	RSAF Wing 11	King Abdulaziz Air Base, Dhahran, Eastern Province	No. 7 Squadron RSAF; No. 35 Squadron RSAF; No. 75 Squadron RSAF; No. 83 Squadron RSAF; Fighter Weapons School	
	RSAF Wing 12	King Khalid Air Base, Khamis Mushait, Asir Province	No. 100 Squadron RSAF; No. 201 Squadron RSAF; No. 202 Squadron RSAF; No. 203 Squadron RSAF; No. 204 Squadron RSAF	
	RSAF Wing 13			
	RSAF Wing 14			
	RSAF Wing 15	King Saud Air Base, Hafar al-Batin, Eastern Province	No. 12 Squadron RSAF; No. 17 Squadron RSAF; No. 92 Squadron RSAF	
	RSAF Wing 16	Al-Jouf Air Base, Sakaka, Al-Jouf Province	No. 15 Squadron RSAF; No. 45 Squadron RSAF	

=== Squadrons ===
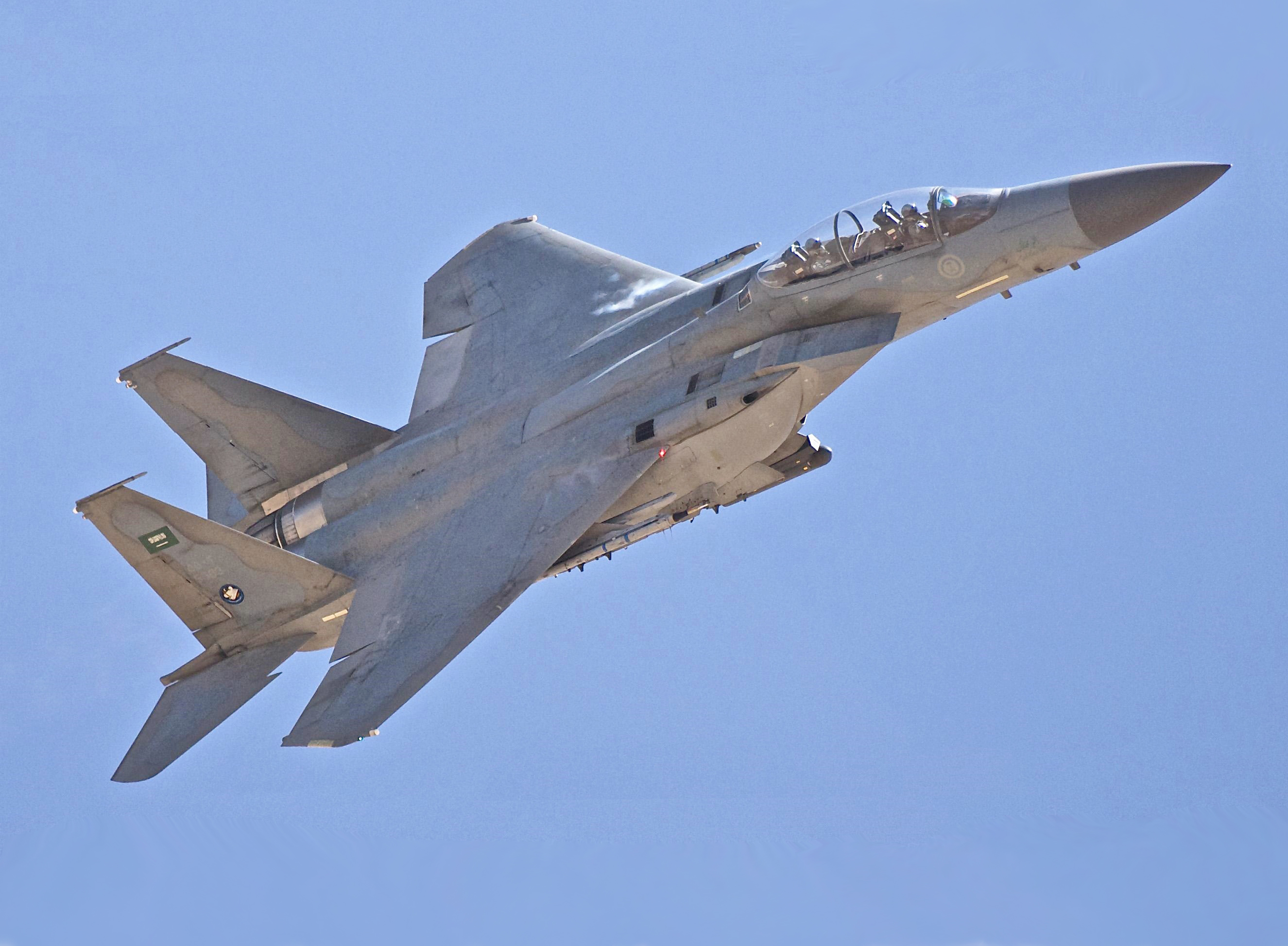
Saudi F-15 flying over the training lanes

- 1 Squadron (Royal Flight)
- 2 Squadron (F-15C/D)
- 3 Squadron (Typhoon F.2/T.3)
- 4 Squadron (C-130H)
- 5 Squadron (F-15C/D)
- 6 Squadron (F-15S/SA)
- 7 Squadron (Tornado IDS)
- 8 Squadron (Cirrus SR22T/MFI-395)
- 9 Squadron (PC-21)
- 10 Squadron (Typhoon F.2/T.3)
- 12 Squadron (Bell 412EP)
- 13 Squadron (F-15C/D)
- 14 Squadron (Bell 212/412EP)
- 15 Squadron (F-15SA)
- 16 Squadron (C-130H/C-130H-30)
- 17 Squadron (F-15SA)
- 18 Squadron (E-3A)
- 19 Squadron (Beech 350ER-ISR & RE-3A/B)
- 20 Squadron (C-130H)
- 21 Squadron (BAE Hawk 165)
- 22 Squadron (PC-21)
- 23 Squadron (KE-3A)
- 24 Squadron (A330-203/243 MRTT)
- 25 Squadron (Bell 412EP)
- 29 Squadron (F-15SA)
- 32 Squadron (KC-130H/J)
- 33 Squadron (Royal Medical Flight)
- 34 Squadron (F-15C/D)
- 35 Squadron (Jetstream)
- 37 Squadron (BAE Hawk 65)
- 41 Squadron (Beech 350i)
- 44 Squadron (Bell 412EP)
- 45 Squadron (Bell 412EP)
- 50 Squadron (Beech 350i)
- 55 Squadron (F-15SA)
- 60 Squadron (Saab 2000AEW&C)
- 66 Squadron (AS532A2); previously (Tornado IDS)
- 71 Squadron (Operational Conversion Unit)
- 75 Squadron (Tornado IDS)
- 77 Squadron (PC-21)
- 79 Squadron (BAE Hawk 165)
- 80 Squadron (Typhoon F.2)
- 83 Squadron (Tornado IDS)
- 88 Squadron (BAE Hawk 65/A)
- 92 Squadron (F-15S/SA)
- 99 Squadron (AS532M Cougar)
- 100 Squadron (Falcon 1/Seeker 401)
- 201 Squadron (Selex ES Falco)
- 202 Squadron (Wing Loong 1)
- 203 Squadron (CH-4B/Wing Loong 2)
- 204 Squadron (Oqab)
- 207 Squadron (Bayraktar AKINICI)

Other Squadrons:

- 11 Squadron (OUT OF SERVICE)
- 30 Squadron (OUT OF SERVICE) (Helicopters)
- 42 Squadron (OUT OF SERVICE) (F-15C and F-15D)

== Equipment ==
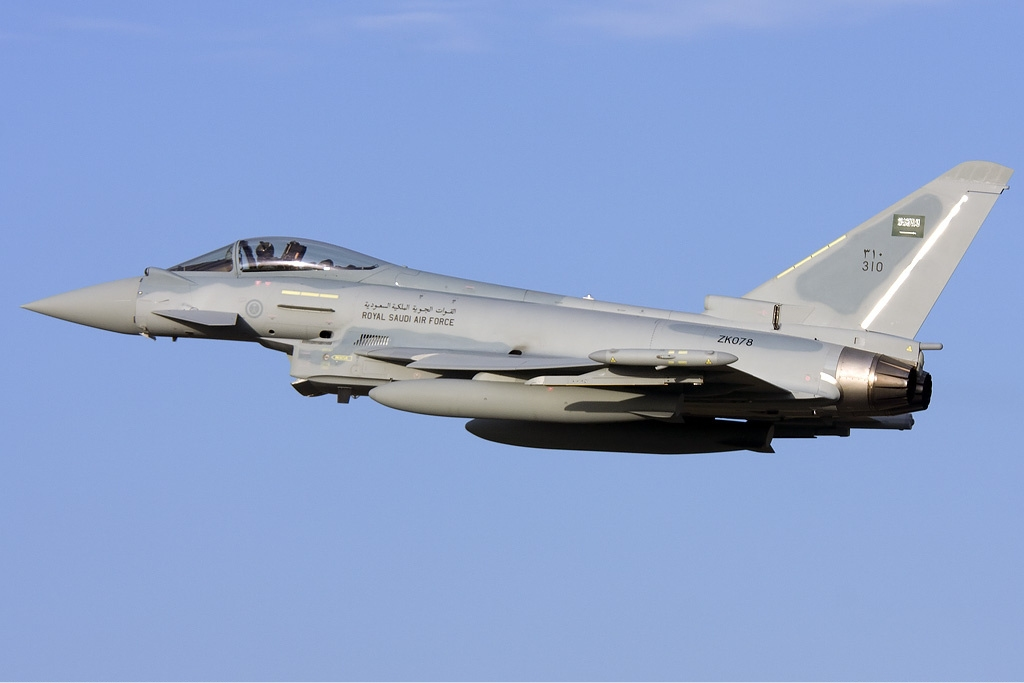
Eurofighter Typhoon near Malta International.

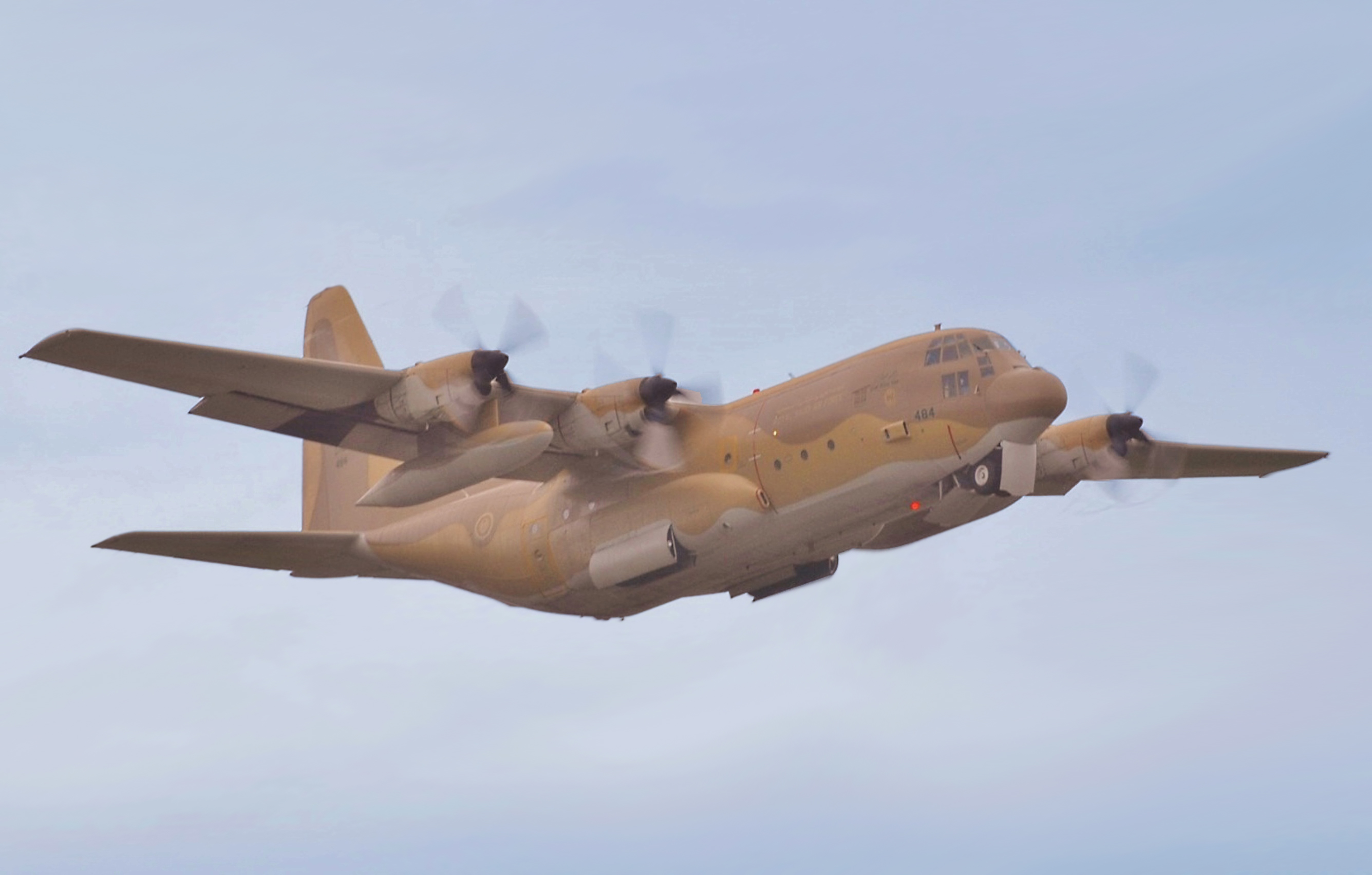
Royal Saudi Air Force C-130H departing East Midlands Airport.

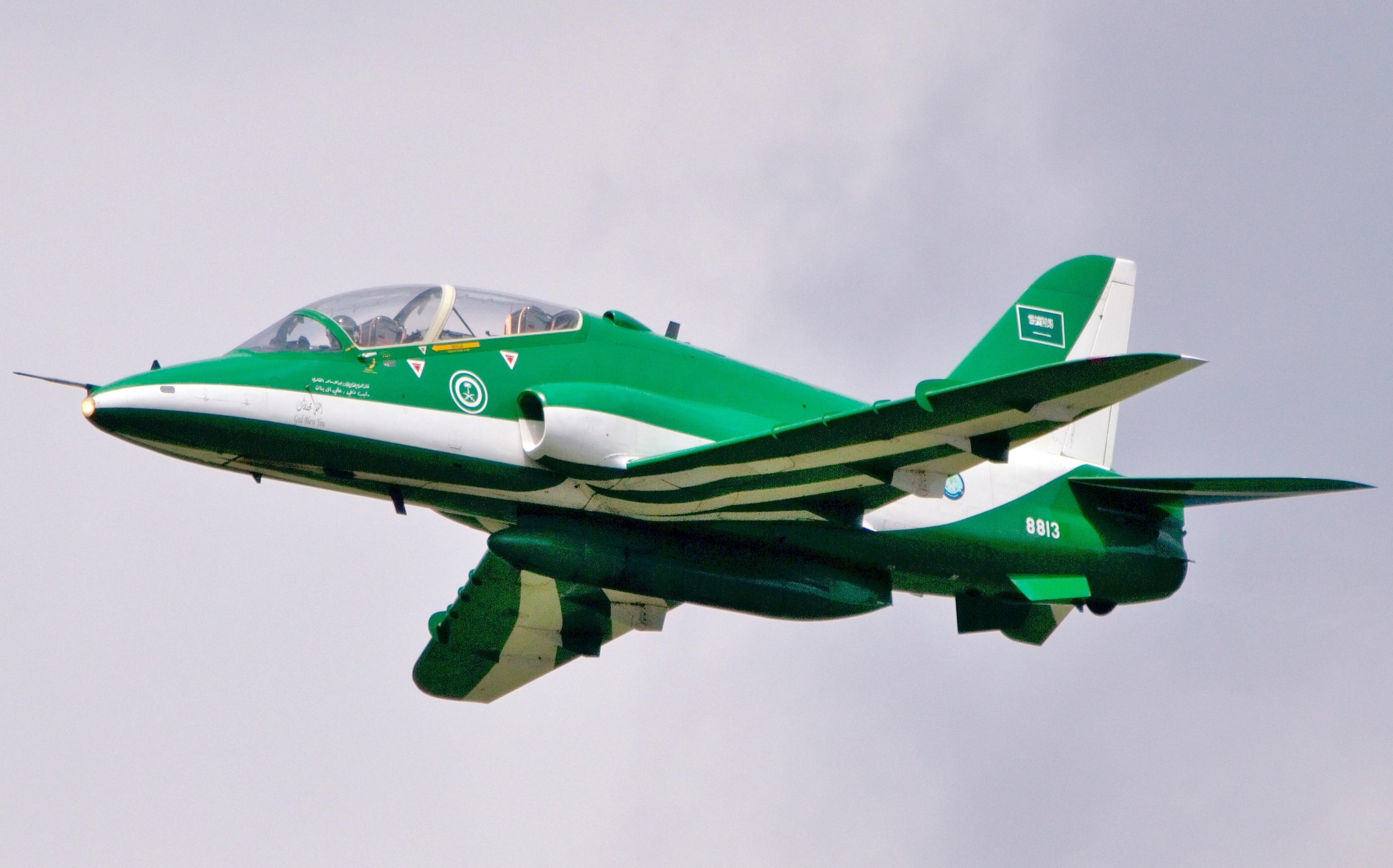
BAE Hawk from the Saudi Falcons display team.

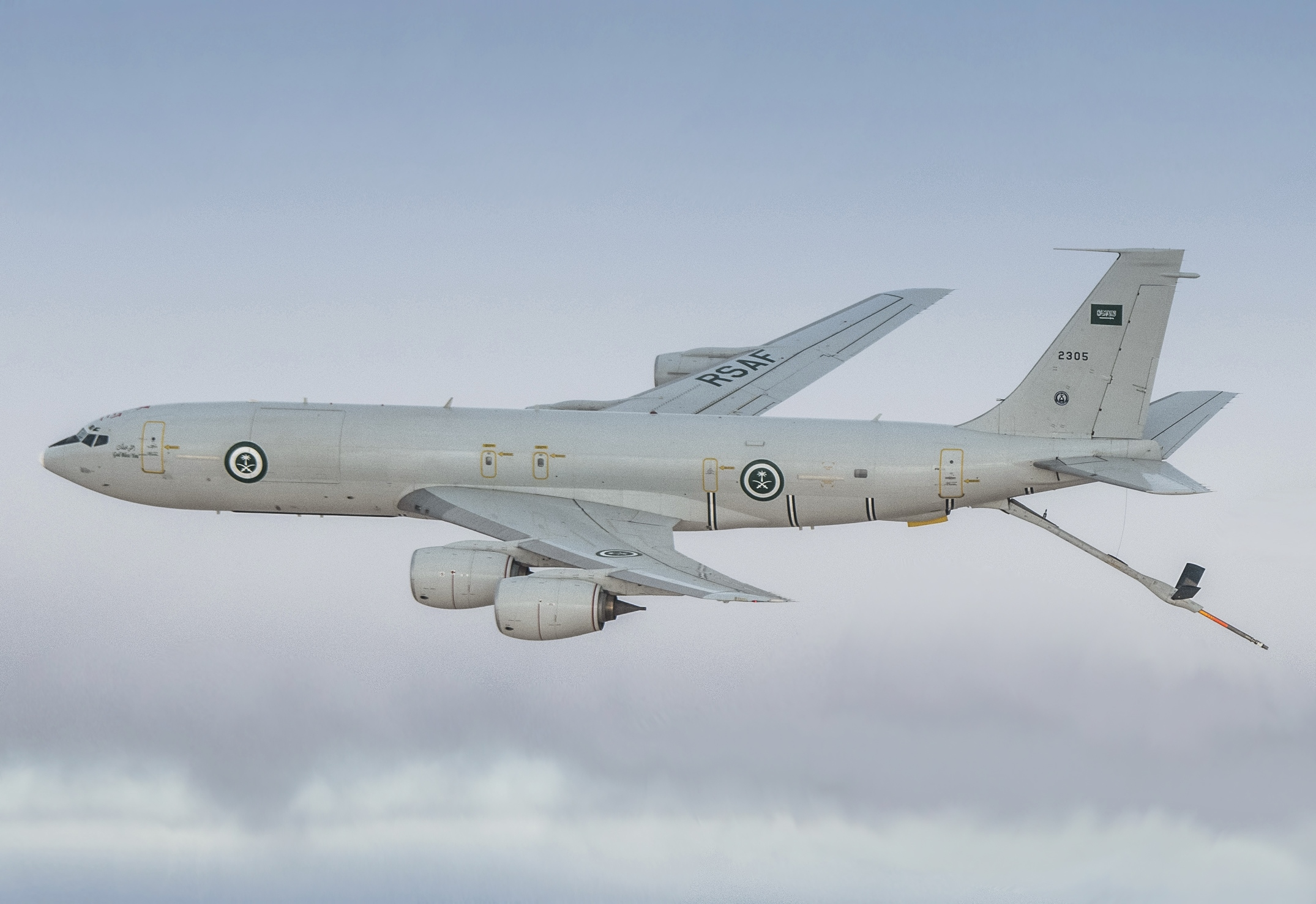
A Boeing KE-3A of the Royal Saudi Air Force.

Aircraft	Origin	Type	Variant	In service	Notes
Combat aircraft
Eurofighter Typhoon	(European Union) UK / Germany / Italy / Spain	multi-role	T2/T3A, T53	72	Aircraft initially delivered to RAF Coningsby (and UK registered), RSAF Typhoon pilots trained by the Royal Air Force
Panavia Tornado	(European Union) UK / Germany / Italy	multi-role	IDS	81	MLU upgrade TS3 in 2018 similar to RAF GR4
F-15 Eagle	United States	air superiority / conversion trainer	F-15C/D MSIP II	210	21 used for training. 1 lost in 2026
F-15E Strike Eagle	United States	strike fighter	F-15SR	210	21 used for training. 1 lost in 2026
F-15EX Eagle II	United States	strike fighter	F-15SA	210	21 used for training. 1 lost in 2026
F-35 Lightning II	United States	multi-role	F-35A	0	Up to 48 aircraft in a proposed sale approved by the US in September 2026
AWACS
E-3 Sentry	United States	AEW	E/RE-3A	6	1 used for SIGINT / ELINT missions
Saab 2000	Sweden	AEW&C	2000 AEW&C	2	
Aerial refuelling
Boeing KC-707	United States	aerial refuelling tanker	KE-3A	7	
Airbus A330 MRTT	(European Union) France / Germany / UK / Spain	multi-role tanker transport, aeromedical	A330-243 MRTT	6	4 on order
KC-130 Hercules	United States	tanker	KC-130H	7	
KC-130J Super Hercules	United States	tanker	KC-130J	2	
Transport
Airbus A330 MRTT	(European Union) France / Germany / UK / Spain	multi-role tanker transport, aeromedical	A330-243 MRTT	6	4 on order
Gulfstream IV	United States	VIP transport		2	
BAe Jetstream	United Kingdom	VIP transport	31	1	
Cessna Citation II	United States	VIP transport	Bravo	4	
Super King Air	United States	transport, reconnaissance	350	17	8 used for reconnaissance, 4 on order
C-130 Hercules	United States	tactical airlifter	C-130H	33	
Helicopters
Bell 212	United States	utility		22	
Bell 412	United States	utility		14	
Sikorsky UH-60	United States	utility	UH-60L	2	
Eurocopter AS332	France	utility / SAR		15	2 on order
Trainer aircraft
BAE Hawk	United Kingdom	advanced jet trainer	65A/165	81	
Pilatus PC-21	Switzerland	advanced turbo-prop trainer		55	
Cirrus SR22	United States	light trainer		25	
PAC MFI-17 Mushshak	Pakistan	primary trainer		20	

=== Retired ===
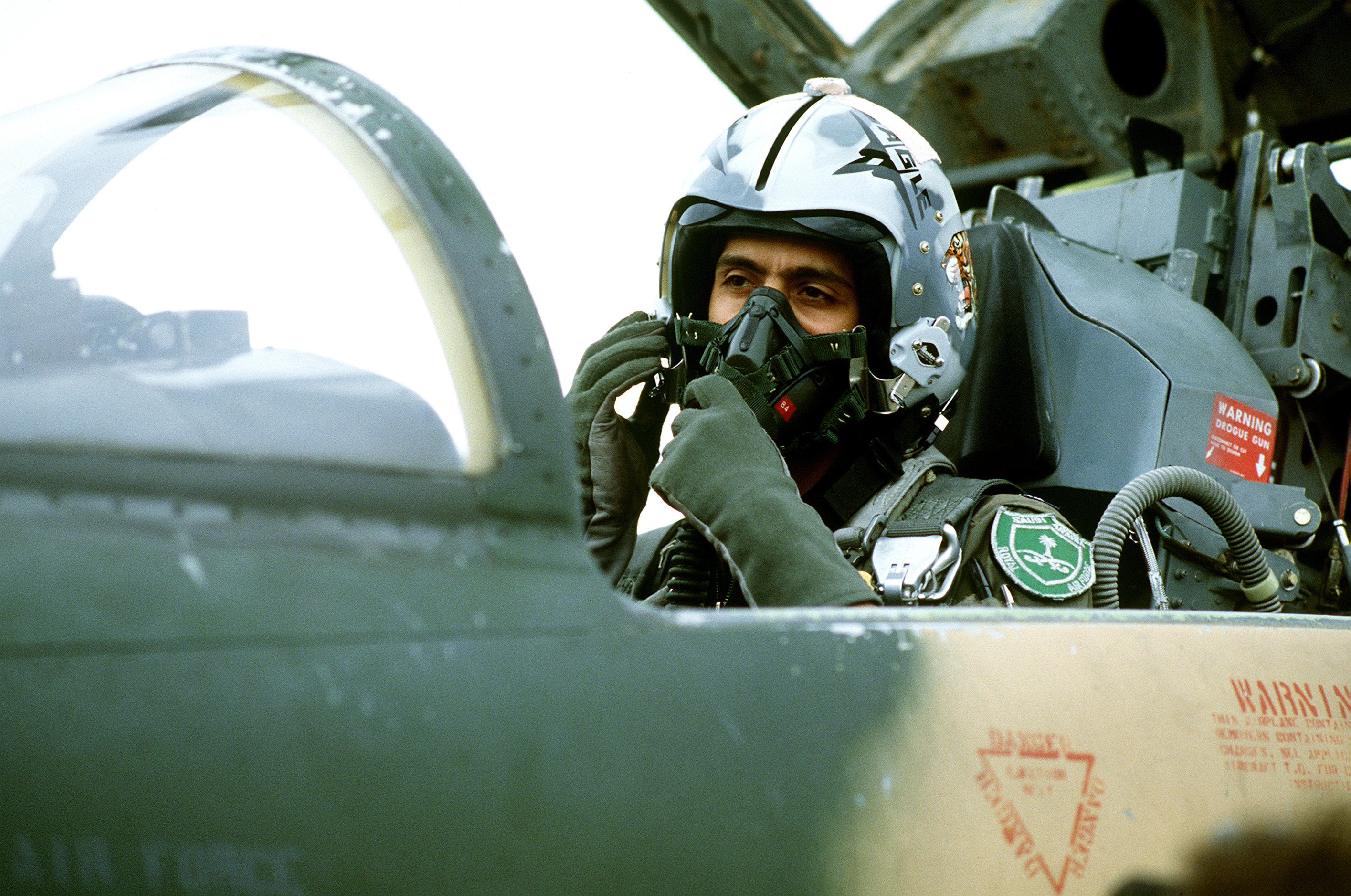
A Royal Saudi Air Force pilot adjusts his oxygen mask in an F-5E Tiger II prior to flying a training mission in 1983.

Previous aircraft operated included the F-86F Sabre, DH.100 Vampire FB.52, BAC Strikemaster Mk.80A, Hunter F.60, DHC-1 Chipmunk Mk.10, C-54A Skymaster, C-123B Provider, T-6A Texan, T-33A Shooting Star, Cessna 310, O-1 Bird Dog, T-35A Buckaroo, T-34A Mentor, OH-58A Kiowa, T-28A Trojan, F-5E Tiger II, Lockheed JetStar, dH Comet 4C (VIP transport), BAe 146, Alouette III, Tornado ADV F3, BAC Lightning F53

=== Drones ===
Saudi Arabia owns unmanned aerial vehicles (Drones), including for attack, surveillance, and reconnaissance. In 2012, Saudi Arabia purchased 50 Italian Selex Galileo Falco drones. In 2014, Saudi Arabia signed a contract with China to purchase Wing Loong drones, and Saudi Arabia has more to receive so far.

In April 2013, Saudi Arabia announced its desire to buy 6 Turkish TAI Anka drones, however these efforts fell through.

Saudi Arabia has pursued projects to manufacture national drones, the first of which was in 2012, when Saudi Arabia announced a programme to manufacture drones in the King Abdulaziz City for Science and Technology. The project was called Saqr, and three new models of the drone have been introduced. Saudi Arabia also announced a new drone called Samoom, the Saudi crown prince showcased the new drone to the Egyptian President Abdul-Fattah Al-Sisi, during which he showed significant interest in it.

Saudi Arabia also announced in 2021 that it will start producing a high capability drone called SkyGuard. It also established a laboratory for robotic vehicle research at the Prince Sultan Advanced Technology Research Institute at King Saud University. The laboratory aims to build and transfer technology in the field of smart vehicles of all kinds, such as unmanned aircraft, autonomous land vehicles, and others. The laboratory has manufactured many unmanned aircraft, and the aircraft are still undergoing research and development.

Saudi Arabia has started technology transfer projects and joint ventures with countries to manufacture drones. The General organization for Military Industries obtained a license to manufacture the German drone project Luna, manufacturing hundreds of them for the Saudi armed forces. Saudi Arabia also entered a joint venture with South Africa to manufacture the Seeker 400 UCAV.

In July 2023, Saudi Arabia's Ministry of Defense signed an agreement with Turkish drone maker Baykar for Bayraktar Akıncı combat drones. Baykar also announced plans for technology transfer and joint production.

== Commander ==
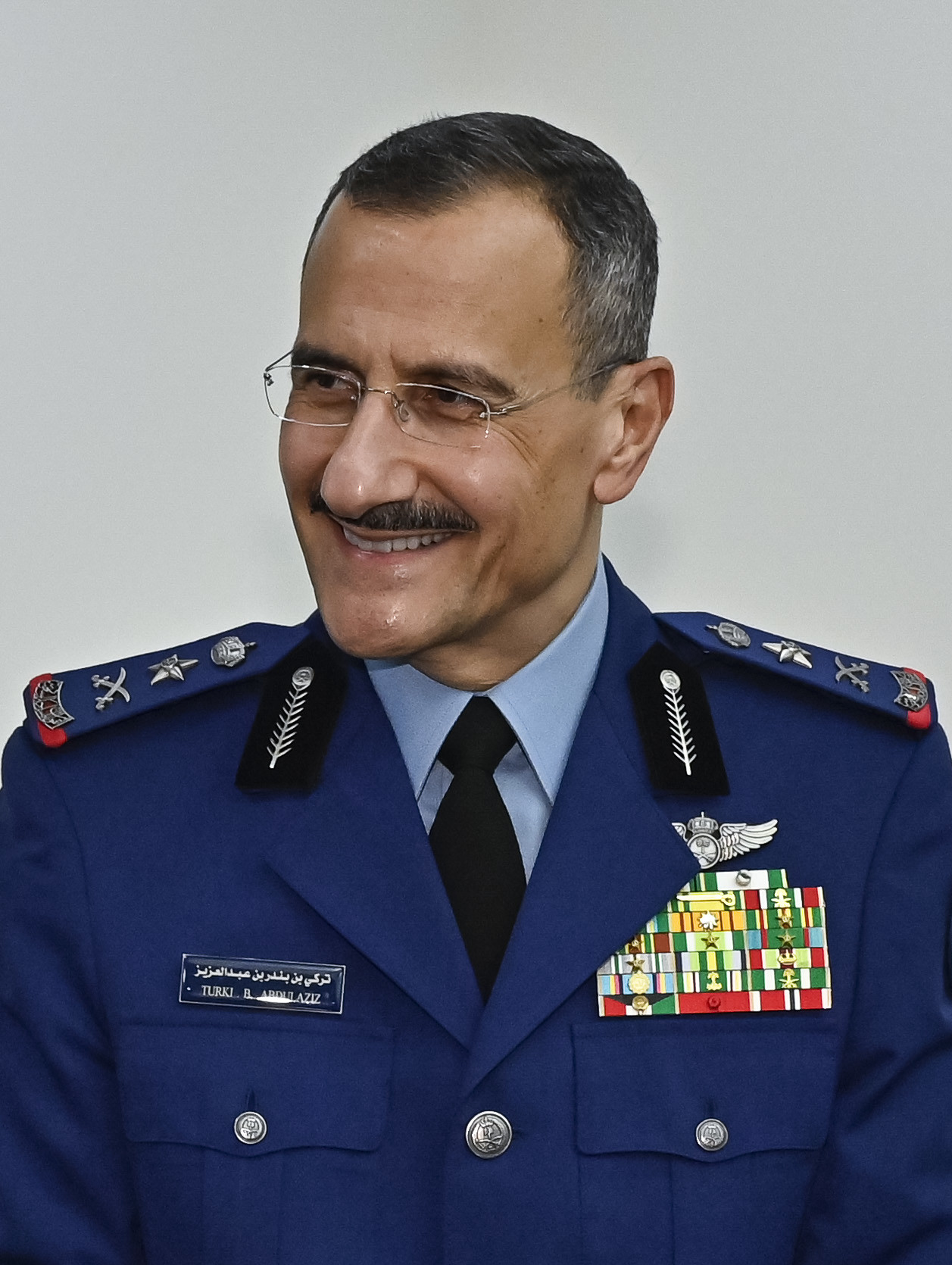
Lieutenant General Turki bin Bandar, Commander of the Royal Saudi Air Force since 26 February 2018.

== See also ==
- Royal Saudi Air Force Museum
- Prince Sultan Advanced Technology Research Institute, a defense research and development center established by Royal Saudi Air Force and King Saud University.
- Hejaz Air Force
