= No. 17 Squadron RSAF =

- Active: Unknown-present
- Country: Saudi Arabia
- Branch: Royal Saudi Air Force
- Type: Squadron
- Part of: RSAF 15 Wing
- Base: King Saud Air Base, Hafar al-Batin
- Aircraft: McDonnell Douglas F-15SA Strike Eagle

No. 17 Squadron RSAF is a squadron of the Royal Saudi Air Force that operates the McDonnell Douglas F-15SA Strike Eagle at King Saud Air Base, Hafar al-Batin, Eastern Province in Saudi Arabia within RSAF 15 Wing.
