= No. 19 Squadron RSAF =

- Active: Unknown-present
- Country: Saudi Arabia
- Branch: Royal Saudi Air Force
- Type: Squadron
- Part of: RSAF 6 Wing
- Base: Prince Sultan Air Base, Al-Kharj
- Aircraft: Beech 350ER-ISR; Boeing RE-3A; Boeing RE-3B

No. 19 Squadron RSAF is a squadron of the Royal Saudi Air Force that operates the Beech 350ER-ISR, Boeing RE-3A and the Boeing RE-3B at Prince Sultan Air Base, Al-Kharj, Riyadh Province in Saudi Arabia within RSAF 6 Wing.
