= No. 33 Squadron RSAF =

No. 33 Squadron RSAF Royal Medical Flight
- Active: Unknown-present
- Country: Saudi Arabia
- Branch: Royal Saudi Air Force; Royal Saudi Armed Forces Medical Services
- Type: Squadron
- Base: King Salman Air Base
- Aircraft: Various

No. 33 Squadron RSAF is a squadron of the Royal Saudi Air Force that operates various aircraft at King Salman Air Base at King Salman International Airport, Riyadh, Riyadh Province in Saudi Arabia.

The squadron uses the:

- Eurocopter AS365N Dauphin
- Boeing 757-23A
- Beechcraft King Air 350
- Lockheed C-130H Hercules
- Gulfstream G-IVSP
- Gulfstream G-V
- Gulfstream G450
- Lockheed L-100-30
- Learjet 60XR
- Sikorsky S-70A-1L
