= No. 20 Squadron RSAF =

No. 20 Squadron RSAF No. 20 Squadron (OCU) RSAF
- Active: Unknown-present
- Country: Saudi Arabia
- Branch: Royal Saudi Air Force
- Type: Squadron
- Role: Training
- Part of: RSAF 8 Wing
- Base: King Abdullah Air Base, Jeddah
- Aircraft: Lockheed C-130H Hercules

No. 20 Squadron RSAF is a squadron and Operational Conversion Unit of the Royal Saudi Air Force that operates the Lockheed C-130H Hercules at King Abdullah Air Base, Jeddah, Mecca Province in Saudi Arabia within RSAF 8 Wing.
