= Sohag International Airport =

Airport in Egypt

Sohag International Airport (SIA) مطار سوهاج الدولي
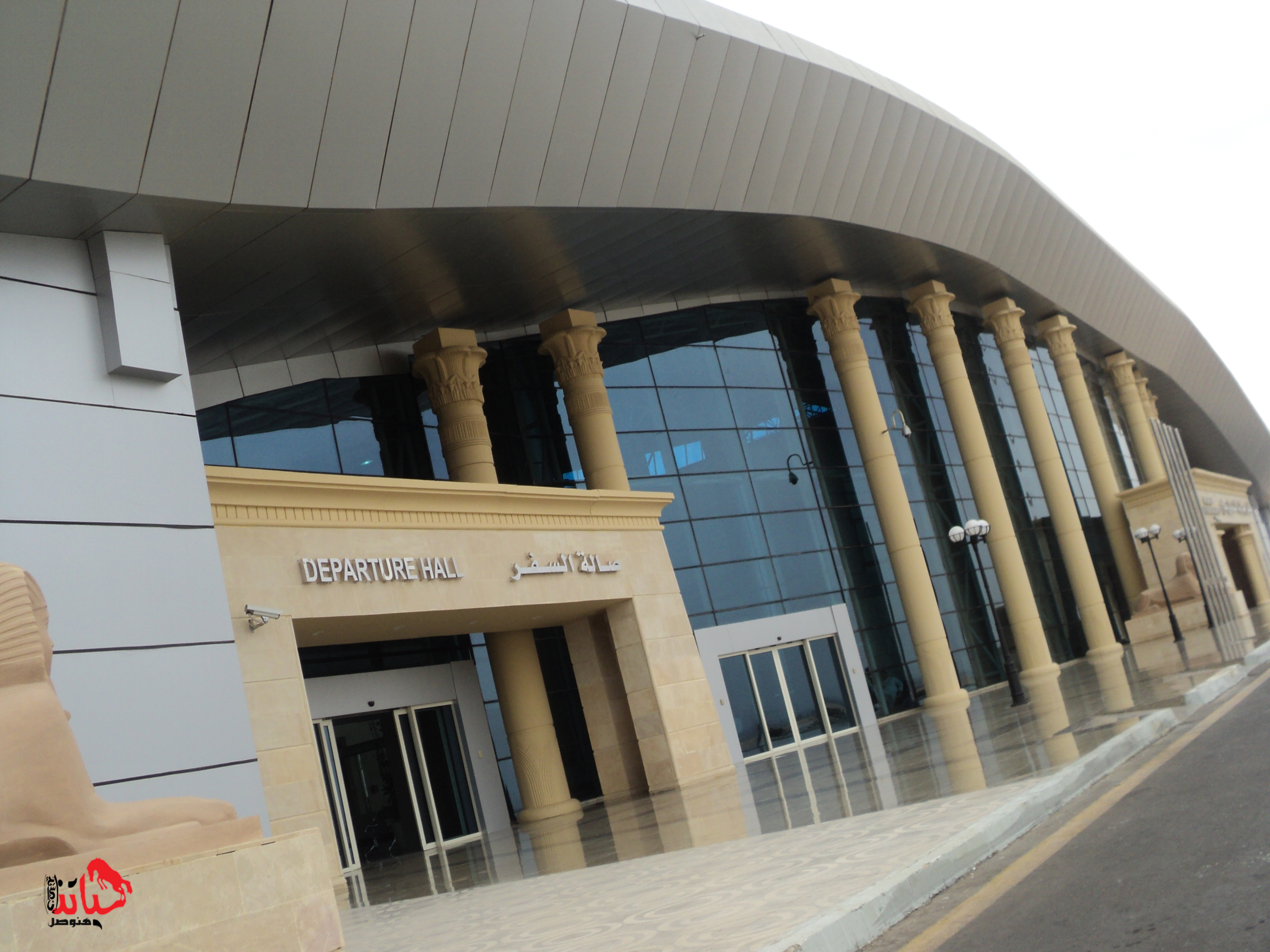
- IATA: HMB; ICAO: HESG

Summary
- Airport type: Public
- Operator: Government
- Location: Sohag, Egypt
- Elevation AMSL: 859 ft (262 m)
- Coordinates: 26°20′25″N 31°44′20″E

Map
- Location of airport in Egypt

Runways
Direction	Length		Surface
Direction	m	ft	Surface
15/33	3,000	9,843	Asphalt

Statistics (2012)
- Passengers: 311000
- OECD GCM Google Maps

Sohag International Airport (IATA: HMB, ICAO: HESG) (Arabic: مطار سوهاج الدولي) is an Egyptian International airport serving the city of Sohag, capital of the Sohag Governorate of Egypt. The airport is 24 kilometres (15 mi) south of the city. The airport is a new establishment, as it was built in 2010. The International airport is designed to resemble an Ancient Egyptian temple.

The Sohag VOR-DME (Ident: SHG) is located 0.5 nautical miles off the threshold of runway 15.

== History ==
The airport was officially inaugurated by former Egyptian President Hosni Mubarak on 25 May 2010. The project cost an estimated US$80 million, with construction beginning in January 2009 to include a passenger terminal, control tower, aprons, a runway, and 33 buildings allocated for various airport services. The airport was originally known as Mubarak International Airport, but following the ousting of Mubarak in 2011 and a subsequent court verdict ordering removal of Mubarak's name from all establishments in Egypt, the airport was renamed Sohag International Airport.

== Facilities ==
The facility is built to handle approximately 3.5 million passengers per year. The passenger terminal is designed with a unique Pharaonic motif, comprising international halls for arrivals and departures, a VIP hall, duty-free shops, and security facilities. The airport has its own electricity, water, sewage, and communication stations. There is parking for 400 vehicles and 25 buses.

The airport's single runway is 3 kilometres (1.9 mi) long and 45 metres wide. The airport can receive aircraft as large as the Airbus A320 and Boeing 737. The apron is designed to handle 6 aircraft, with plans to expand this to accommodate 14 aircraft.

The new airport is the fifth international airport in Upper Egypt after Luxor, Aswan, Assiut, and Abu Simbel. The airport primarily caters to domestic travel and traffic between Sohag/Upper Egypt and the Persian Gulf states including Kuwait, Saudi Arabia and the United Arab Emirates.

== Airlines and destinations ==
Airlines	Destinations
Air Arabia	Abu Dhabi, Sharjah
Air Cairo	Abha, Al Jawf, Amman–Queen Alia, Cairo, Doha, Gassim, Jeddah, Jizan, Kuwait City, Medina, Riyadh, Tabuk (All suspended)
Egyptair	Cairo
Flyadeal	Jeddah
Flynas	Jeddah, Riyadh
Jazeera Airways	Kuwait City
Kuwait Airways	Kuwait City

== See also ==
- Transport in Egypt
- List of airports in Egypt
