= King Abdullah International Airport =

Jizan International Airport
- IATA: GIZ; ICAO: OEGN

Summary
- Airport type: Public / Military
- Operator: General Authority of Civil Aviation & Military of Saudi Arabia
- Serves: Jizan (Gizan)
- Location: Jizan Province, Saudi Arabia
- Elevation AMSL: 20 ft (6.1 m)
- Coordinates: 16°54′04″N 042°35′09″E

Map
- Location of airport in Saudi Arabia

Runways
Direction	Length		Surface
Direction	m	ft	Surface
15/33	3,050	10,006	Asphalt

King Abdullah bin Abdulaziz International Airport (IATA: GIZ, ICAO: OEGN), also known as Jizan international Airport, is an airport serving Jizan (also spelled Gizan), the capital city of the Jizan Province in Saudi Arabia. It is named after King Abdullah.

== Facilities ==
The airport resides at an elevation of 20 feet (6 m) above mean sea level. It has one runway designated 15/33 with an asphalt surface measuring 3,050 by 45 metres (10,007 ft × 148 ft). The airport has one main terminal with two different sectors, one for departures and one for arrivals. The airport also has another small terminal for short haul international arrivals and departures to near countries such as United Arab Emirates and Egypt

== Airlines and destinations ==
Airlines offering scheduled passenger service:

Airlines	Destinations
Air Arabia	Cairo, Sharjah
Air Cairo	Cairo, Sohag
Ethiopian Airlines	Addis Ababa
Flyadeal	Dammam, Jeddah, Riyadh
Flydubai	Dubai–International
Flynas	Abha, Dammam, Jeddah, Riyadh
Nile Air	Cairo
Saudia	Dammam, Jeddah, Riyadh, Tabuk, Taif

== Replacement ==
The Civil Aviation of Saudi Arabia has confirmed and released a short trailer of the new airport that will replace the current airport. It will be named King Abdullah International Airport Jizan. According to the Centre Of Aviation's official website, the airport project, estimated at SR 2.5 billion (US$667 million), will feature a single passenger terminal with 10 aircraft gates and a VIP lounge, cargo facilities and a control tower. The airport is predicted to have the capacity to handle 2.4 million passengers p/a.

== International Flights ==
The General Authority of Civil Aviation (GACA) started operations of international flights to and from King Abdullah Bin Abdulaziz Airport in Jazan on April 9, 2015,

The airport received the first international flight from Cairo International Airport with over 100 passengers on board.

Director General of the airport Hamid Hammad Al-Ghareebi and other officials received the first international flight.

== History ==
Some Yemeni rebels attempted to attack the airport and other airports in the region. It failed.

== See also ==
- List of airports in Saudi Arabia
- List of things named after Saudi kings
- General Authority of Civil Aviation
- King Fahd International Airport
