= Al-Jouf International Airport =

Airport in Sakaka, Saudi Arabia

Al-Jouf International Airport مطار الجوف الدولي
- IATA: AJF; ICAO: OESK

Summary
- Airport type: Public / Military
- Owner/Operator: General Authority of Civil Aviation / Royal Saudi Air Force
- Serves: Al-Jouf Province
- Location: Sakaka, Saudi Arabia
- Opened: 1974; 52 years ago (initial opening), 25 February 2026; 6 months ago (current facilities)
- Elevation AMSL: 2,261 ft (689 m)
- Coordinates: 29°47′06″N 040°06′00″E

Map
- Location of airport in Saudi Arabia

Runways
Direction	Length		Surface
Direction	m	ft	Surface
10/28	3,661	12,011	Asphalt

Al-Jouf International Airport (IATA: AJF, ICAO: OESK) is a joint civil-military airport located in Sakaka, Saudi Arabia, serving Al-Jouf Province.

== History ==
The airport was opened in 1974 to serve Al-Jouf Province in northern Saudi Arabia, and for several decades it operated as a domestic airport. In 2018, it was designated as an international airport, allowing it to handle international flights in addition to domestic services.

A new passenger terminal was constructed as part of aviation infrastructure development in Saudi Arabia to replace the existing facilities. The terminal was inaugurated on 25 February 2026, after which all operations were transferred to the new facility.

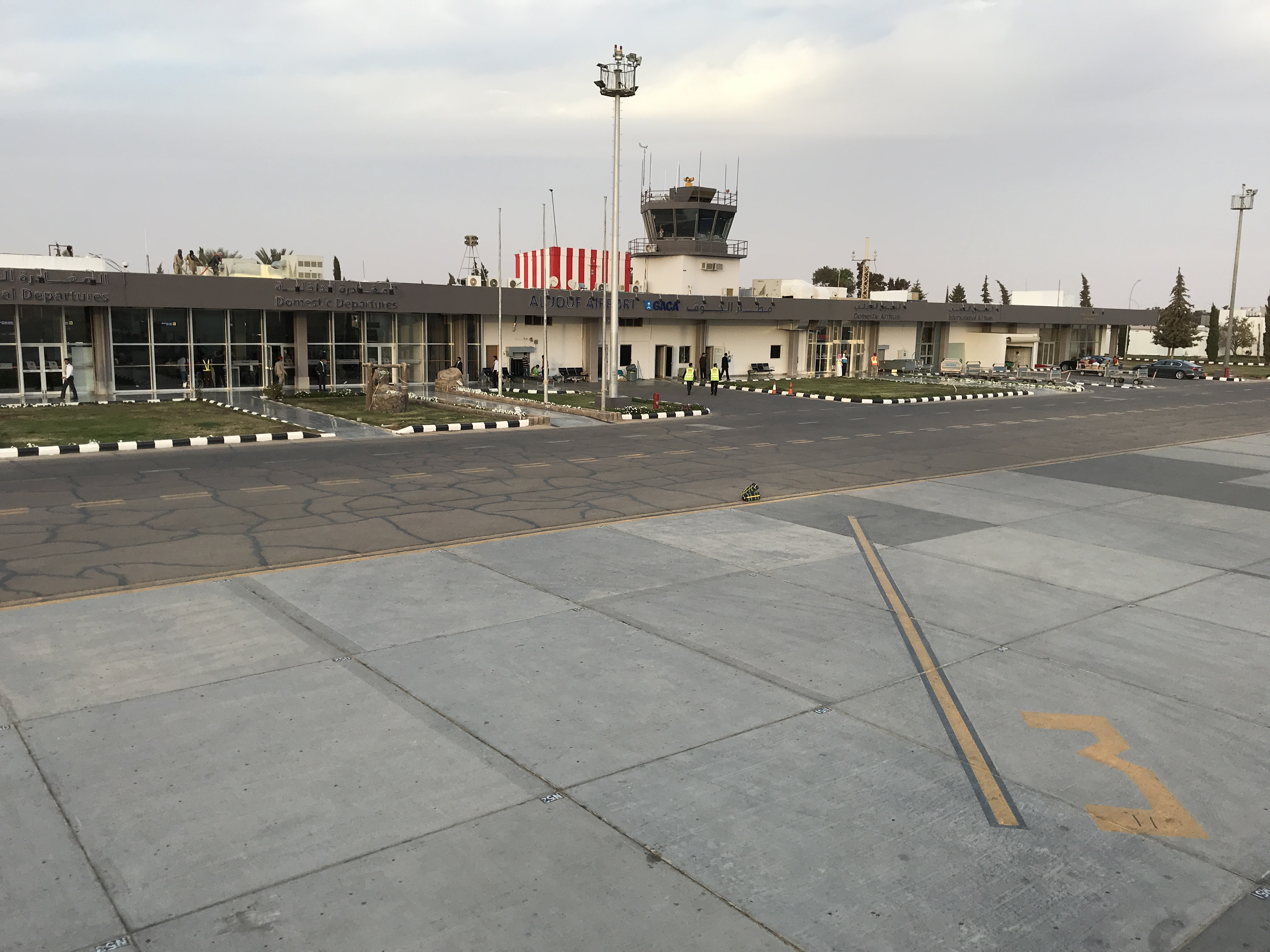
Al-Jouf Airport old terminal in 2017

The redevelopment increased the airport’s annual passenger capacity to approximately 1.6 million, compared with about 175,000 previously.

== Airlines and destinations ==
Airlines offering scheduled passenger service:

Airlines	Destinations
Air Arabia	Sharjah
Air Cairo	Assiut, Cairo, Sohag
Flydubai	Dubai–International
Flynas	Riyadh
Jazeera Airways	Kuwait City
Nesma Airlines	Cairo
Nile Air	Cairo, Sohag
Saudia	Jeddah, Riyadh

== See also ==
- Transport in Saudi Arabia
- List of airports in Saudi Arabia
