= Jeddah International Airport (closed 1981) =

Former airport in Jeddah

Jeddah International Airport مطار جدة الدولي
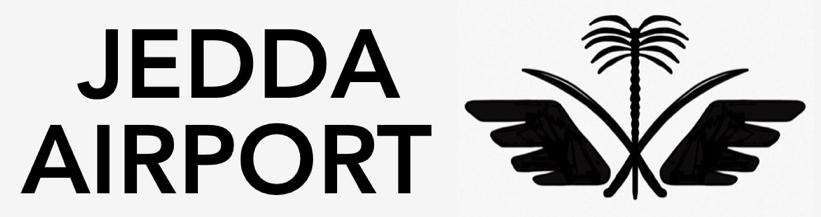

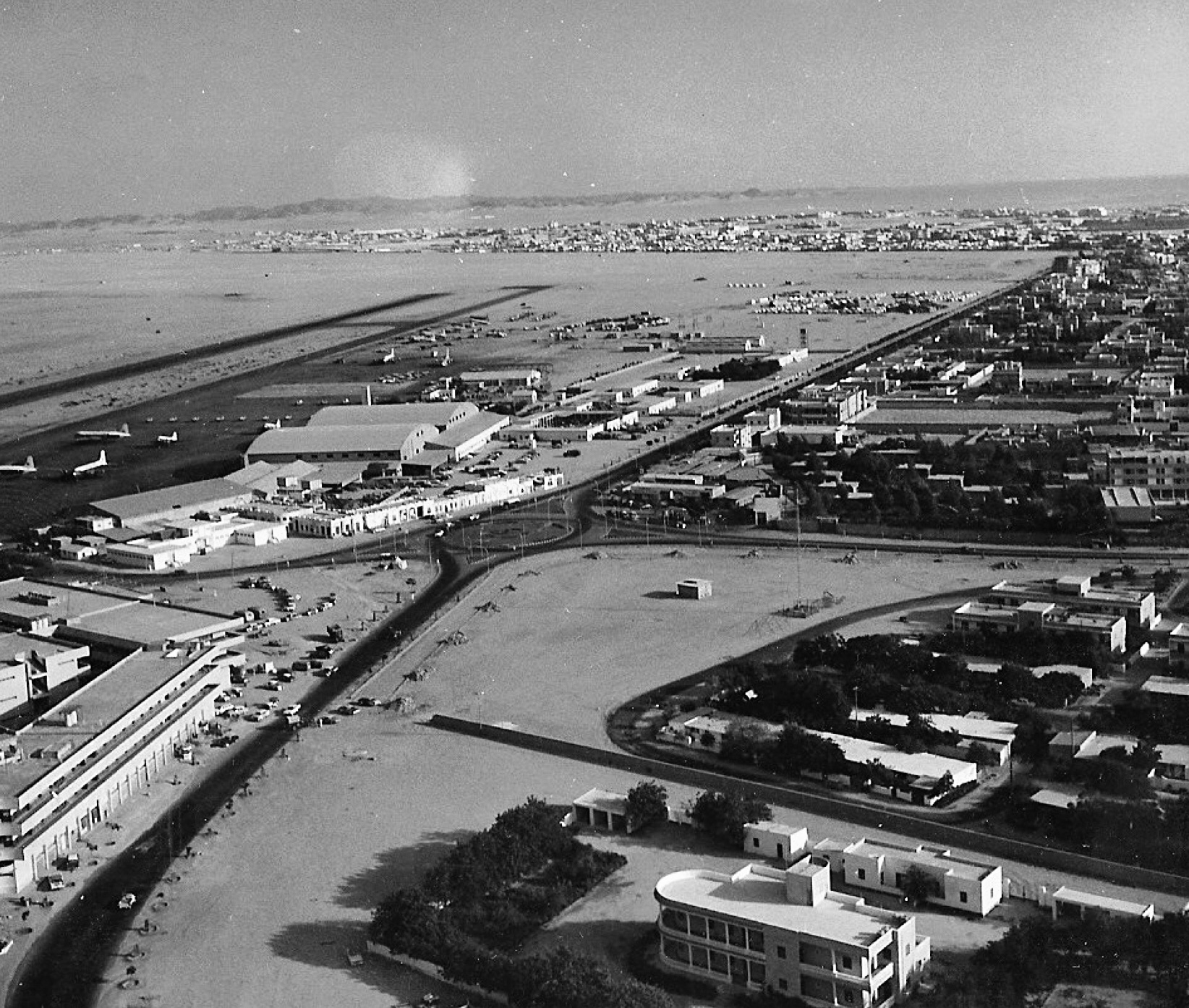
- IATA: ~~JED~~; ICAO: ~~OEJD~~

Summary
- Airport type: Defunct
- Owner: Government of Saudi Arabia
- Operator: General Directorate of Civil Aviation
- Serves: Jeddah and Mecca
- Location: Al-Kandara and Al-Sharafiya, Jeddah in Saudi Arabia
- Opened: 14 October 1952; 74 years ago
- Closed: 31 May 1981
- Passenger services ceased: May 1981
- Hub for: Saudia (formerly)
- Focus city for: Air France (formerly)
- Built: 1921
- In use: 1921 – 1925 (Hejaz Air Force); 1936 – 1981 (Royal Saudi Air Force)
- Elevation AMSL: 50 ft (15 m)
- Coordinates: 21°29′51″N 39°12′36″E
- Interactive map of Jeddah International Airport

Runways
Direction	Length		Surface
Direction	ft	m	Surface
~~15L/33R (1979)~~	~~9,842~~	~~3,000~~	~~Concrete~~
~~15R/33L (1964)~~	~~9,400~~	~~2,865~~	~~Asphalt~~
~~15/33 (1952)~~	~~9,200~~	~~2,804~~	~~Asphalt~~
~~09/27 (1952)~~	~~4,600~~	~~1,402~~	~~Asphalt~~

Jeddah International Airport, colloquially referred to as Abbas Ibn Firnas Airport, Jeddah Airport or Kandara Airport ~~(IATA: JED, ICAO: OEJD)~~ was a major international airport in Saudi Arabia located between the neighbourhoods of Al-Kandara and Al-Sharafiya, Jeddah. It was the principal airport serving the cities Jeddah and Mecca in the kingdom before the construction of King Abdulaziz International Airport (KAIA). The airport was the first to handle commercial civilian flights in the kingdom, expanding to become a major gateway into Mecca. Throughout operation, it served pilgrims during Haji seasons while also handling regular scheduled flights. Jeddah Air Base shared runways with the airport, and served as a primary Royal Saudi Air Force base.

The history of Jeddah Airport began in 1921 as Kandara Aerodrome, later evolving into Jeddah Air Base. The first civil aviation operations commenced in 1945, and it was formally inaugurated as an airport in 1952. By the 1950s, air travel to Mecca for Hajj pilgrims became popular. The significant urban growth of Jeddah by the 1970s made it unfeasible to expand and cater the traffic, leading to the development of KAIA. Throughout its history, it had three asphalt runways and one concrete runway. Commercial operations at Jeddah International Airport ceased in May 1981, and the transfer of equipment was finalised in 1983.

Following the end of transfer, Royal Orders were issued to appropriate portions of the former airport in stages. This allowed the construction of a medical city, malls, and residential areas. This area formed the Old Airport District, supported by two major roads that were built over the two former highways. Today, much of the former airport remains undeveloped, although the hajj accommodations, some hangars and terminals have since been demolished.

== History ==
=== Beginnings of civil aviation ===
Although the landing ground itself was established in 1921 to support the early Hejaz Air Force, civil aviation began during the mid-1940s. In May 1945, U.S. President Franklin D. Roosevelt gifted the Kingdom of Saudi Arabia a Douglas DC-3, which later landed at Kandara Aerodrome. Following the donation, several earthen airstrips were established around Saudi Arabia. These airstrips were constructed in Jeddah, Riyadh, Dhahran and Hawiyah in Taif, Hofuf, Buraidah, Jizan, Al-Kharj and Afif. An important moment was marked, when in June 1945, the kingdom's first international flight was made from Jeddah to Damascus. On 31 July 1945, British Overseas Airways Corporation began including Jeddah along its route, and is among the first airlines to serve the airport. It provided two weekly services to various destinations in Egypt, Sudan, Ethiopia, and Kamaran in Yemen using the Lockheed Model 18 Lodestar. In September 1945, Saudi Arabian Airlines (now known as Saudia) was established, and by 1946, became a fully government agency of the Ministry of Defense. Its operating base was located in Jeddah Airport. Throughout the 1940s, Jeddah Airport had minimal facilities; only served by a basic sand-packed strip where camels commonly intruded onto the runway, and no airport buildings existed at the time. There were no regular passenger services, and flights would have to be manually arranged. The airport saw occasional visits by British aircraft from Aden and aircraft from the United States carrying hitchhiking passengers. During this time, the airport mainly served diplomatic missions from government officials and the Royal family. The airline also flew mail between Jeddah, Taif and Riyadh. In 1947, an Airwork Services mission arrived in Jeddah Airport to establish and facilitate early civil aviation training and maintenance. The first ten student pilots were enrolled, and completed their initial training by August 1949.

"I came from Tehran aboard the air attache's plane, and when we arrived at Jeddah Airport, there was simply a Quonset hut. There were no buildings or anything of that sort. ... There was an immigration officer who sort of looked and wasn't particularly interested. And as I remember, some of the employees in this Quonset hut, the airport, had a tame baboon, and that baboon sort of looked everybody over, and if the baboon approved, then one got through. That's my first recollection of Jeddah."

— Hermann F. Eilts, former U.S. ambassador to Saudi Arabia, recalls Jeddah Airport during 1948. Interviewed by Jihan El-Tahri on 23 June 2003 in Boston.

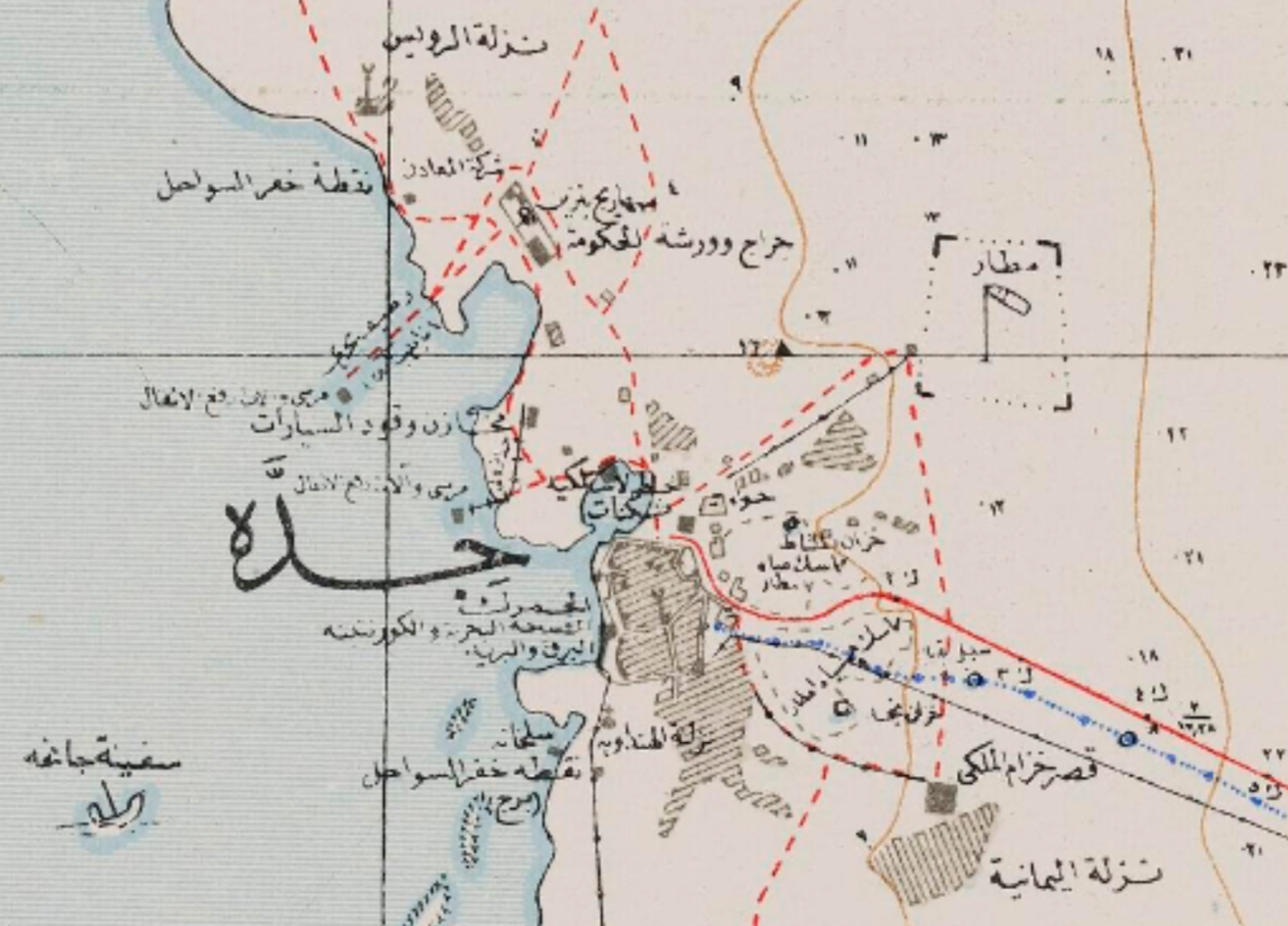
1945 Egyptian survey map depicting Jeddah and its nearby aerodrome.

By the 1950s, air travel to Mecca quickly became popular, because of how it was time sufficient and required less walking. On average, Jeddah Airport would see 250,000 pilgrims commute through the airport, and the usage of ox-carts, walking, and camels quickly lost popularity. As a result in 1952, a main and a crosswind runway, and an apron, all asphalt, were constructed at Jeddah Airport in preparation for the formal inauguration of the civilian and military components. The main asphalt runway measured 3,048 metres (10,000 ft) long and 45.7 metres (150 ft) wide capable of handling up to 120,000 pounds (54,000 kg). The smaller crosswind runway measured 1,828 metres (5,997 ft) long and 45.7 metres (150 ft) wide. In the airport were facilities that included four steel hangars, maintenance workshops, and a fuel storage capacity of approximately 65,400 US gallons (248,000 L) of Avgas.

On 14 October 1952, Jeddah Airport and its facilities were officially inaugurated and opened under the patronage of His Royal Highness Prince Saud Bin Abdulaziz. Following the opening, Misrair opened a route to Jeddah Airport using an aircraft named The Flying Greek, weekly every Monday, Wednesday, Thursday and Saturday. It also had a travel agency, Hussein Al-Aouini & Co., based in Jeddah. On the military side of the airport, the Royal Saudi Air Force inaugurated its base on 5 November 1952. By 6 November 1952, the airport had developed a significant amount of maintenance facilities. It had a maintenance records office that kept aircraft reports and maintenance logs under the supervision of the Head of Maintenance, operations & flight planning section which sent telegrams regarding airspace and recorded aircraft movements, and a fire department section equipped with two fire engines and firefighting equipment. The airport also consisted of many workshops, which included an engine overhaul workshop where aircraft engines were inspected, tested and refitted after returning from overhaul in England and Scotland, and an electrical workshop supervised by foreign technical specialists trained in Dhahran and the United States, and operated by Egyptian and Saudi mechanics. Workshops involving aircraft components were also present, including a metal workshop responsible for manufacturing metal aircraft components such as copper parts and also repairing engine covers, propeller workshop which handled reinstallation of propellers, and a fabric workshop responsible for fabric-covered and interior aircraft components. Other workshops included a paint workshop responsible for overhauling aircraft instruments and gauges supervised by a Norwegian specialist assisted by Egyptian and Saudi mechanics, and finally a carpentry workshop for interior woodwork. Hangar No. 2 was also fitted with a hydraulic system, where Cessna aircraft were lifted for inspection and testing.

"Oh Lord, God has bestowed upon our beloved nation countless blessings under your honorable leadership, and we are gathered here today to witness one of the greatest steps of modern progress in our Kingdom. Under the grand vision and guidance of His Majesty the King, and with the direct support of Your Royal Highness, the Civil Aviation Department has worked tirelessly to build a strong foundation. We have built modern runways, tracking centers, and infrastructure in Jeddah and beyond to ensure our air traffic handles growing global demands. We promise to keep advancing, keeping our skies safe, and continuing to elevate the flag of the Saudi Kingdom in the global aviation sector."

— Ibrahim Al-Tassan, Director General of the Aviation Department during the opening ceremony on 5 November 1952 (English translation)

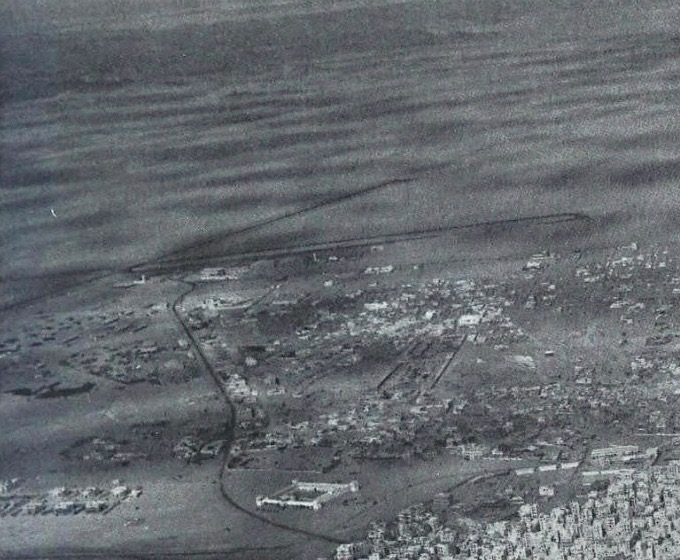
An oblique photo showing Al Kandara District and Jeddah Airport in 1952.

In 1953, a civilian air traffic control tower was built at Jeddah Airport, becoming the country's first. In the event of an emergency that involved the United States, American McDonnell F-101 Voodoo fighter jets and the Martin B-57C Canberra were to operate from the airport. Additionally, the Douglas C-54 Skymaster and Douglas C-124 Globemaster II aircraft would also be used for military cargo operations. Beginning in 1956, frequent economic crises resulted with strict austerity measures. Major expansions and upgrades to the airport slowed down, though small extensions of the parallel taxiway and apron still occurred. In 1959, the Saudia Pilot Training Institute was established in the airport. Its aviation training facilities were modest at best, it being housed within a small building. Baha Aldeen Asad served as the principal and Captain Norm Doerr was appointed as the American supervisor for the school. It had a flight instructor, photographer, student supervisors, and usually taught a small group of 14 students selected from 20 applicants. Additionally, the school had a small canteen, which would serve coffee and doughnuts for the students. The trainees received a salary of 600 riyals a month, and were taught English before advancing to higher forms of training. Often, the course would last a year and concluded with a short flight.

=== Accommodations for the Haji ===
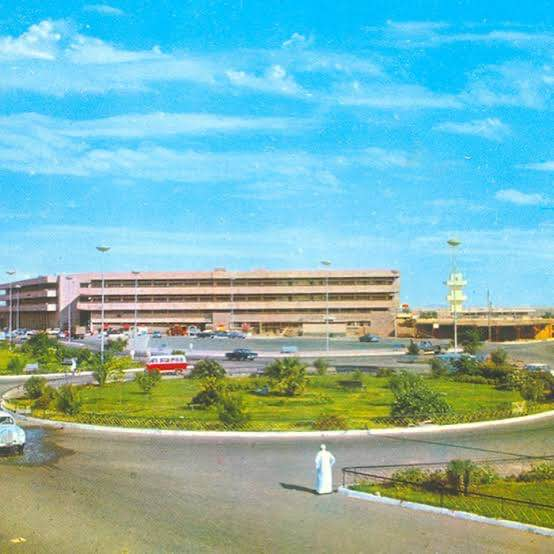
Pilgrim’s Square located in Jeddah Airport, c1950s.

Before the 1950s, arriving Hajj pilgrims often stayed in rental residential houses. In 1950, a 5,000 person facility near the seaport was built, and in 1953-54, a 2,000 person facility was constructed south of the city. In 1958, the Al Ain Azizia administration rushed the construction of the third city, which was made to accommodate the rising number of African hajj pilgrims. The third city was located in the airport, beside the air traffic control tower and hangars. Following the decision, five buildings with three floors at an estimated area of 9,652 square metres (2.39 acres) were built, which could accommodate 2,000 pilgrims. This project also included the construction of Pilgrim's Town Square, the entrance to the accommodations and airport. From day and night, hundreds of pilgrims of diverse ethnicities passed through these accommodations.

The dormitories housed 10-36 people per room, accommodated with communal bathrooms. These buildings were designed to minimize social distinctions, and open-air latticework allowed airflow and sound circulation. Large undivided balconies were also built, which encouraged social interaction. There also was a simple, repetitive architecture which reflected the unity of the Haji, which emphasized the egalitarian spirit of pilgrimage. These pilgrims could stay days within the accommodations until departure to Mecca, which had offices for pilgrimage guides, health, and passport services. Shops, restaurants, banks, a mosque, and government agencies were also serviced within the compound.

In 1959, the administration granted an adjacent plot of land to establish a secondary building, though it was not directly part of the five buildings. It was located at the curve of Palace-Airport Road (King Fahd Road), serving as the headquarters for the Aziziyah Spring Waqf. Baggage processing would also be carried out from the building for departing Indonesian and Malaysian pilgrims.

=== Growth ===
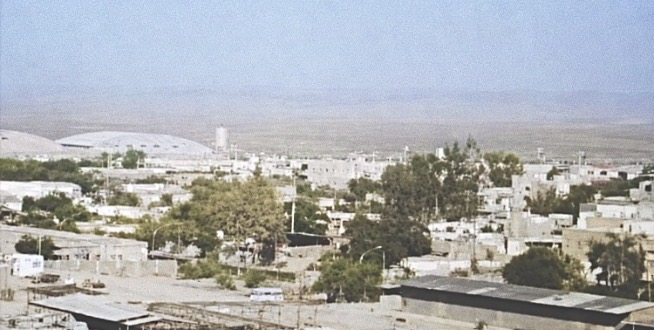
Al-Kandara district in Jeddah during the 1970s.

Al-Kandara, the neighbouring district of the airport, gained popularity due to its proximity to the airport and seaport. It was considered the capital of Jeddah, having hospital, administrative, and accommodation facilities. In early 1959, Saudi Arabian Airlines inaugurated a daily pressurized Convair-Liner shuttle between Jeddah and Riyadh. Later that year, the airline established its Technical Services Division, and a double-bay hangar was subsequently built to house the division. The hangar was retrospectively capable of handling the B707-200. Throughout the 1960s, the number of international pilgrims arriving by air instead of sea had significantly increased. For example, approximately 1,000 Indian pilgrims arrived annually to Jeddah by Air-India’s chartered flights, while around 14,500 still arrived by sea from Bombay. The chartering of these flights were managed by the Haj Committee, under the company Trade Wings. In September 1961, support facilities and a hangar were erected at the airport's RSAF complex, completed in December 1962. A concrete extension to the apron was also done under the project. In 1964, when King Faisal bin Abdulaziz began his rule, the expansion and growth of Jeddah resumed at a more controlled pace. That year, an asphalt runway was built parallel to runway 15/33, 120 metres (390 ft) apart and numbered 15R/33L. The new runway offloaded pressure on the existing runway, and allowed the decommissioning of the crosswind runway to expand the apron. At the time, the crosswind runway's approach interfered with the growth of the Al-Kandara neighbourhood. Additionally, the control tower was expanded to two floors, and the tower height was increased. In 1965-66, two buildings were built to house Saudi Arabian Airlines' cargo offices and also to handle pilgrim repatriation operations. Four departure halls, a commercial market, and another large shelter were also added. In 1968, heavy rainfall led to a flood in Jeddah, which came from valleys east from the city, damaging the walls of the airport.

By the 1970s, Jeddah International Airport controlled a flight information region. At the time, aircraft entering Saudi Arabian airspace would have to report their position to either two information regions, which were located at Jeddah and Dhahran. This information would be reported once every 30 minutes, which included nationality, flight registration, altitude, time at reported position, flying conditions, and ground speed, ensuring safe flights. Jeddah International Airport was also declared as a "customs aerodrome", which required aircraft to depart from the airport to fully leave the country. Foreign aircraft were also only allowed to arrive at the airport. In 1973, these international airlines served Jeddah International Airport: Air Algérie, Balkan Bulgarian Airlines, JAT Yugoslav Airlines, Ceskoslovenske Aerolinie (CSA), Ariana Afghan Airlines, Air Afrique, Air Guinée, Afghan Airlines, and Iraqi Airways. In the same year, the administration rushed the construction of eight additional buildings with an area of 65,935 square metres (16.29 acres), able to accommodate 10,000 pilgrims in total. The construction also included an additional transit hall to the airport.

=== Rising congestion ===
External videos
- Footage of Jeddah Airport during the 1970s at Huntley Film Archives
- Footage of Jeddah Airport's ATC during the 1970s at Huntley Film Archives

By the mid-1970s, the rapid growth in air transportation and Jeddah had hindered the airport's viability for future growth. The logistical impact of the steadily multiplying influx of pilgrims became immense, as air traffic control, ramp space, and ground transportation were not adequately equipped and prepared for each period. Due to the city's encroachment, it was considered impossible to expand infrastructure. In 1974, as part of the government-led Airports Development Program, Saudi Arabian authorities selected contractors for a new airport 20 kilometres (12 mi) north of Jeddah, which had more room for expansion. Being so remote, there would be camels grazing just outside the perimeter fence. During June 1974, President Richard Nixon embarked for Jeddah during a major Middle Eastern diplomatic tour. He arrived by Air Force One at the airport on 14 June, accompanied by First Lady Pat Nixon and Secretary of State Henry Kissinger. Meeting with King Faisal during the tour, this was the first visit to Saudi Arabia by a sitting U.S. president. By 1975, the apron was extended to accommodate Saudia's new TriStar L-1011s, and the first approach radar was installed on the runways. In 1976, airborne pilgrims arrived in the airport at a rate of 400 flights a day from the usual 120 flights during the rest of the year. In the same year, the airport handled 361,891 Hajj pilgrims. Although the airport and pilgrimage fees of the airport were levied, the Saudi government shifted towards prioritizing and encouraging pilgrimage traffic. This led to the abolishment of such fees in 1976, subsidizing airport operations and removing financial barriers for pilgrims.

Crowds line for President Nixon's motorcade at Pilgrims Square in Jeddah International Airport, taken on 14 June 1974.

In order to meet passenger demands, Jeddah International Airport was significantly expanded by authorities to cater the increasing traffic and Haji seasons. Subsequently, Lockheed Martin was awarded a US$650 million contract in 1976 for the installation of a new air traffic control system, which included navigation aids supplied by ITT Federal Electric, instrument landing systems installations by Standard Elektrik Lorenz AG, and high-frequency communications equipment by Rockwell Collins. In September 1976, International Aeradio was awarded a US$60 million contract for the construction of a Flight Operations Training Centre for Saudi Arabian Airlines based at Jeddah International Airport. Further improvements included the installation of large transient centers, from which pilgrims would be able to travel faster to Mecca from Jeddah. Additionally, a new terminal complex comprising three buildings, a Saudia ticket office, departures hall and an arrivals hall were completed by the spring of 1978. This would serve the last three Hajj seasons. Following this, the old terminal was requisitioned into Hajj accommodations. In 1978, 36 airlines served Jeddah Airport. By 1978, Jeddah International Airport handled aircraft arriving at a rate of 17 aircraft an hour, which increased to 78 aircraft an hour during Hajj seasons. It had become the busiest airport in Saudi Arabia for handling domestic flights, although this was surpassed by Riyadh International Airport entering 1979.

"The weather forecast is cancelled today because of the weather. Forecasts are obtained from the airport, and roads there from our office were impassable. Whether we get the weather tomorrow depends on the weather."

— Australian architect Richard Meldrum recalls an ironic incident from the Saudi Gazette on 16 January 1979

With their primary headquarters based within the airport, Saudia's rapid growth conflicted with the planned closure of the airport. As a result, the last major and drastic upgrades took place in 1979 to extend the airport's operating capacity, while the maintenance center was to remain after closure. An asphalt runway numbered 15L/33R was constructed to alleviate traffic on the two existing runways. Subsequently, the original 15/33 runway was merged within the apron. The airport was also expanded towards the Al-Sharafiya neighbourhood, with an additional eastern apron being built. As a result, Jeddah International Airport was coined as the busiest communications centre in the Middle East. Also in the year, a fifth floor was added to the eight buildings, along with a total installation of 30 electric lifts. The resulting complex was able to accommodate 30,000 pilgrims arriving from the airport, using newly implemented arrival procedures and measures. Air France had a facility at Jeddah International Airport for its international operations. Saudia then established a comprehensive maintenance facility on the northern end of the apron, featuring two open-sided buildings. The facility was capable of overhauling jet engines, including those from the major commercial market. Additionally, expansions were made to their training facility, including the Flight Operations Training Centre which was inaugurated in the airport on 12 April 1979. It operated under the Prince Sultan Aviation Academy. The school provided courses on telecommunications, radio navigation, radio and radar engineering, and airfield lighting. It had a capacity of 230 students to be trained in accordance to international standards at the time. The school was equipped with 4 simulators and 12 classrooms, training many of the airline's staff of the era.

Furthermore, Swiss-based aviation business Jet Aviation entered the business at Jeddah International Airport when Mobil Oil preferred localised operations over sending Saudi-based aircraft to Switzerland for maintenance. In 1979, the business established a Fixed-Base Operator (FBO) at the airport, which handled line-maintenance operations especially supporting Mobil. The business would go on to establish a second FBO at Riyadh two years later. The pilgrimage influx not only affected the airport, but also other state carriers. Indonesia would use foreign charter aircraft as Garuda, Mandala, and Bouraq lacked the sufficient aircraft to handle the flights. On 29 March 1980, the Indonesian MUI formally issued its ruling allowing Indonesian pilgrims flying to Mecca to use the airport as their miqat. In 1980, a retired Beech TC-45G Expeditor registered as N9535Z was rescued from a nearby accumulated aircraft boneyard. It was turned into a roundabout installation by Spanish artist and architect, Julio Lafuente during the Jeddah Beautification Project commissioned by the mayor of Jeddah. The plane was perched on a concrete pillar on King Khalid and Al-Matar Road where it still stands today.

These infrastructure upgrades, which especially included the opening of a new runway and terminal, enabled Jeddah International Airport to handle a flight every three minutes with an almost-clear accident record by 1981.

=== Reason for closure ===
Jeddah International Airport was located in the neighbourhood of Al-Kandara and Al-Sharafiya, close to the city center of Jeddah. This proximity hindered the airport's capabilities to expand infrastructure. Due to the airport's deficient capacity, it experienced heavy congestion during Hajj seasons peaking 600 aircraft movements daily by 1978. Additionally, with facilities at the airport incapable of handling cargo, it had to be brought ashore by helicopters.

Every year, Jeddah International Airport would have to prepare for the Hajj season, which saw a one-month increase of approximately 50,000 passengers per day. However, the airport’s facilities were far too small to accommodate the growing city’s needs and the Hajj pilgrimage. Staffing were also inadequate for immigration and customs checks during the peak arrival times, especially in the 10 days before Hajj. The airport also had limited space to house the pilgrims awaiting transportation to Mecca, and many were elderly, non-Arabic-speaking, and inexperienced travellers, which caused delays and confusion during customs processing.

== Closure ==
Folkloric performance by primary-school students in the terminal of the old Jeddah Airport.

Anticipating the closure of Jeddah International Airport, the King Abdulaziz University announced the construction of a new 800-bed hospital on 18 July 1980. Named Jeddah Beach Hospital, it was slated to take place on former airport land, with construction beginning in 1985, and an expectancy to cost $845 million. On 1 April 1981, King Abdulaziz International Airport (KAIA) was inaugurated. Beginning on 31 May, Saudia's inbound and outbound freight operations were transferred to KAIA, which held the new Saudia Cargo building. Inbound freight arriving prior to the date remained at the office at the old airport, with a collection deadline of 17 June. On 1 June, all Saudia flights began departing from the KAIA. The airline's first flight at the new airport, Flight 947, departed at 03:50 heading for Tabuk. Shortly thereafter, Jeddah International Airport's commercial operations ceased, resulting in some cases where passengers arrived at the old airport and left at the new airport. KAIA received the ICAO code "OEJN", which stood for "Jeddah New" while the airport's IATA code "JED" was adopted. All operations were relocated to the airport, and the Aircraft Maintenance Department moved to the new hangars and workshops.

Dar Al-Hanan, an all-girl's school located on Mina Road, was deemed structurally unsafe by engineers and granted use of the vacated terminals by Prince Sultan. When the school relocated, the terminal was opened to provide sufficient space. The nursery and primary stages were moved into the reception hall of the terminal. Halls were subdivided into classrooms, indoor volleyball nets and two basketball hoops were installed, and large open areas held scouting activities and events. As the facilities were spacious, teachers would have to raise their voices for students to hear them, overlapping into other classes as the walls were not soundproof. The alumni of the school can recall that the only feature that distinguished it from an ordinary hall was the presence of old baggage conveyor belts. In 1983, the school reached an enrolment of 1,453 students due to its closer position to the city.

Jeddah International Airport remained operational for general aviation traffic and Saudi government-owned aircraft throughout 1982, whilst aircraft and equipment were transferred to KAIA. In the post-closure months that ensued, Royal Protocol flights resumed and the airport still accepted additional Saudia aircraft. By 31 December 1982, all aircraft other than those owned by the government were removed from the airport. On 1 January 1983, only Saudi government-owned aircraft were permitted at the airport. The airport completed the transfer of equipment in 1983, two years after the inauguration of the new airport. Jeddah Air Base also in this month, closed down operations and its operational squadrons were transferred to King Abdullah Air Base in KAIA. The airport was handed over to the Jeddah Municipality afterwards, and was to be redeveloped into housing.

== Facilities and infrastructure ==
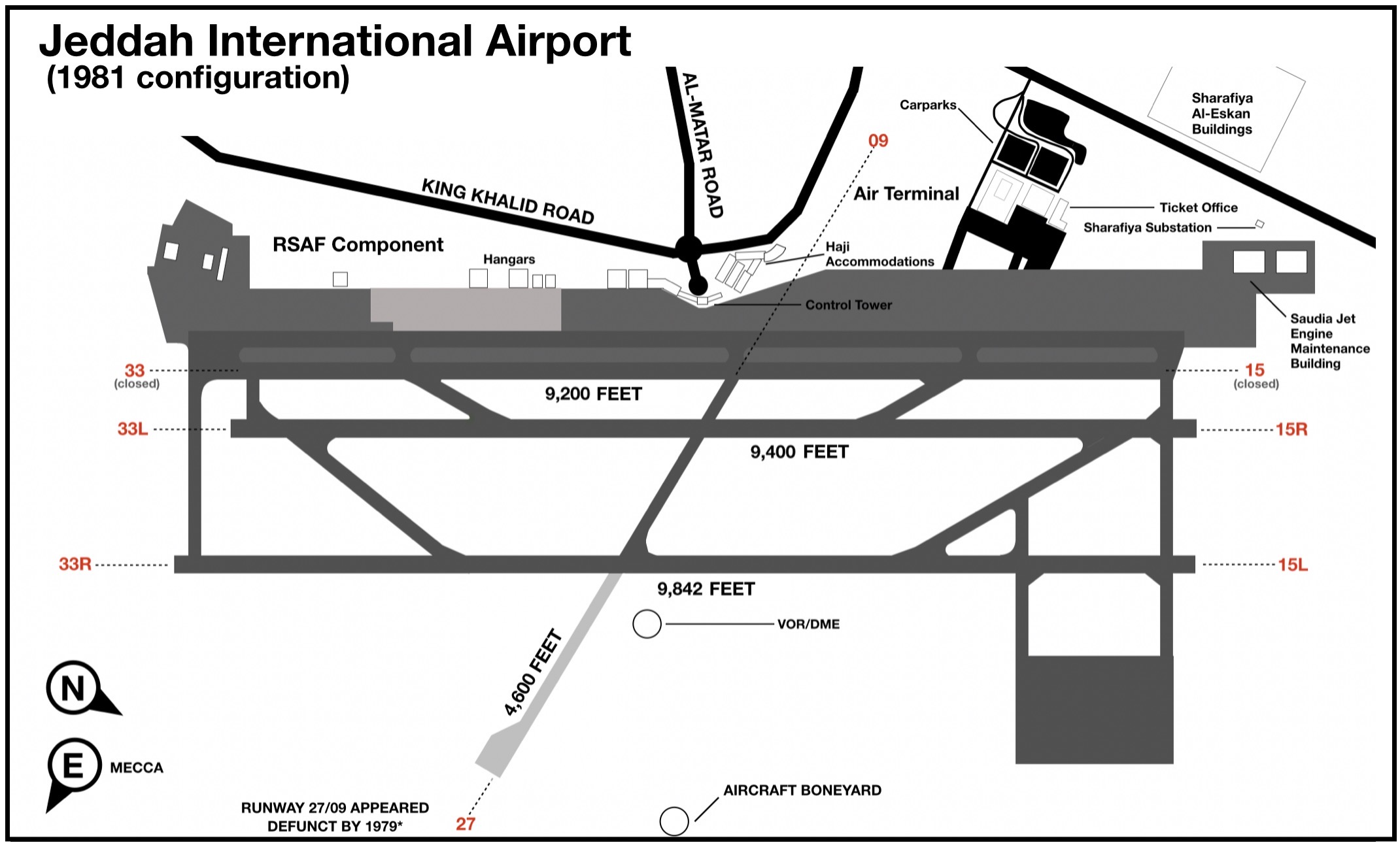
A labeled map of Jeddah International Airport’s 1981 configuration.

At the time of its decommissioning, Jeddah International Airport's land totalled approximately 2,387 acres (9.66 km^{2}), however the full site was approximately 4,828 acres (19.54 km^{2}). The runway capacity was suitable for wide body aircraft (Load Classification Number 90). 33R had full Category I lighting, while the other runways had standard lighting. There were passenger and cargo terminals, and accommodations for the pilgrims. At the hottest month of the year, the airport would reach 33°C at maximum. Shortly before the closure of the airport, the first area control centre in the country was put into operation there. The tower frequency was 118.1 MHz, while the approach frequency was 124.0 MHz, which were in standard VHF aviation band.

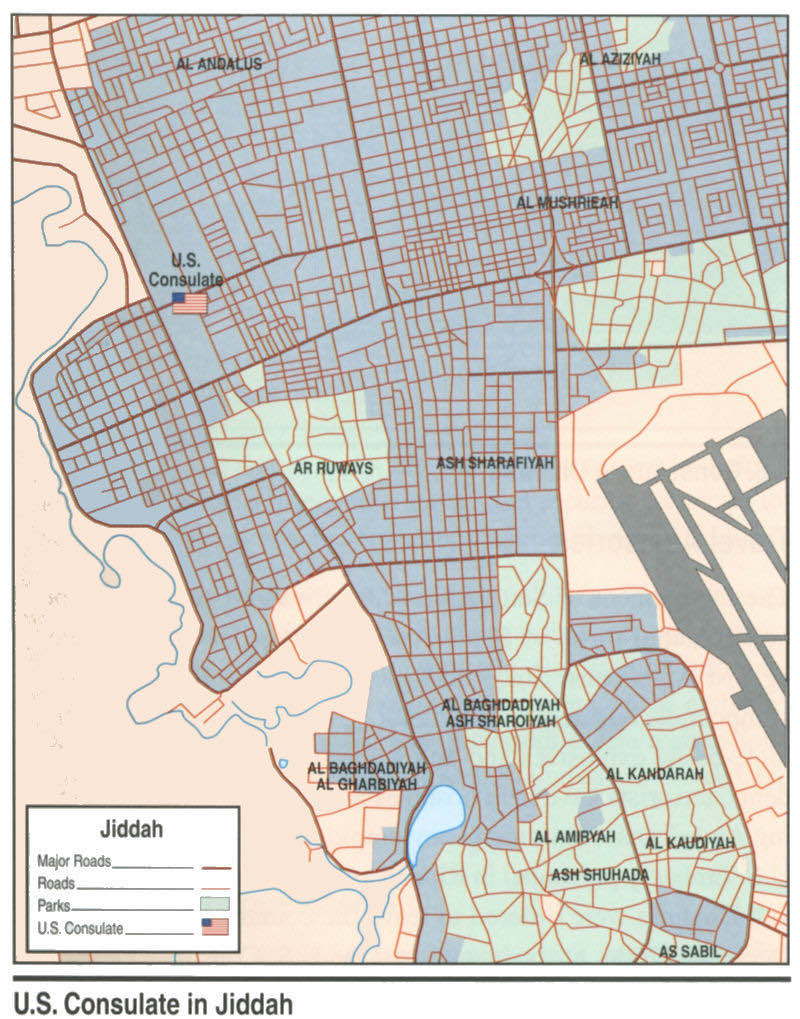
A U.S. Consulate map in Jeddah depicting Jeddah Airport, c1970s.

The airport operated five navigational and visual aids, which included VOR/DME, Terminal VOR (TVOR), Medium-frequency Non-directional beacon (NDBM), Runway visual range (RVR), and a precision landing system equipped for Runway 33R. A Visual Approach Slope Indicator System was active on each runway ends.

In 1952, two new asphalt runways were built: 15/33 measuring 9,200 feet (2,800 m) long and 150 feet (46 m) wide, and crosswind runway 09/27 measuring 4,600 feet (1,400 m) long. In 1964, another runway was built parallel to runway 15/33, which was subsequently numbered 15R/33L. In 1979, a concrete runway numbered 15L/33R was built parallel to runway 15R/33L, measuring 9,842 feet (3,000 m) long. The new concrete runway was equipped with modest lighting technology at the time. Following this, the original runway of 15/33 was merged into the main apron to expand space. Until demolition, runway 09/27 was primarily used by local light training aircraft.

Jeddah International Airport was served by multiple nearby hotels, which included Kandara Palace, Jedda Palace, and Red Sea Palace. These hotels helped ease the congestion of accommodations at Mecca, especially for wealthy pilgrims who could afford the 75 km (47 mi) journey between Jeddah and Mecca.

The following are specialised compounds or facilities that were deeply involved with Jeddah International Airport's operations:

=== Air Terminal ===
During the course of operation, Jeddah Airport had gone through multiple terminal shifts. Beginning in the first floor of the control tower, then the pilgrims' city, and finally ending with an Air Terminal. The facility, located on King Fahd road, comprised two carparks and three buildings; a dedicated Saudia terminal, an arrivals hall, and a departures hall. Each building featured customs control, lounges, and automated baggage handling systems. It was constructed with pre-fabricated panels, and it featured a cantilevered roof. The Saudia terminal, also functioning as a ticket sales office, was opened in February 1978, while the rest of the facilities were complete by Spring that year. A third larger carpark was added in 1979. Following closure, the terminal was vacated and opened for temporary occupation by schools and companies.

=== Air France facility ===
As early as 1971, Jeddah International Airport was one of Air France's destinations without instrument-landing equipment. Between 1970 and 1977, Air France began increasing its Middle Eastern network, increasing from 5 to 12 stops and from 13 to 22 weekly flights. It opened a weekly all-cargo service to Jeddah with a Boeing 747 on 3 April 1977, intending to move food products, construction materials, spare parts, and capital equipment. However, it had to recover its costs of establishing itself locally. It was then further expanded into becoming an Air France station, and an Air France office was established in the adjacent neighbourhood of Sharafiyah. By 1981, Air France had on-site equipment, a dedicated director, and an agent at the airport.

=== TWA Compound ===
Trans World Airlines (TWA) maintained a compound near the airport, containing a flight school, residences for TWA employees and even an open-air theatre and pool for leisure. It was located at Pilgrim's Square, across from the Kandara Hotel. At the time, TWA had a longstanding partnership with Saudia since 1945. Being close to the airport, the theatre would be interrupted every time a plane would land or takeoff. In 1957, the American International School of Jeddah relocated to a new school building at the TWA compound when their original village was too small. In 1975, Saudia began receiving Lockheed L-1011s, its first wide body jets. Afterwards, it began requesting help for training cabin crews including an In Flight Supervisor (IFS). Seeking the opportunity, TWA offered to model the IFS after their Director of Customer Service (DCS) role. Afterwards, six TWA DCS members were given six-month assignments to train Saudia crews at Breech Academy. It also involved to hands-on instruction at the Jeddah TWA Compound.

=== Saudia engine overhaul center ===
Saudia's engine maintenance operations at the Engine Overhaul Center, note the blue terminal is visible on the left-side background.

Located on the northwestern edge of the main apron was the Engine Overhaul Center, presently north of the Mahmoud Saeed Oasis Mall. The center was established in 1979, comprising two open-sided buildings both encompassing 5,400 square metres (58,000 sq ft) of space. It was especially equipped to handle aircraft engines from Pratt and Whitney, General Electric, Rolls-Royce, and CFM International. The facility was equipped with multiple operational sections, including Aircraft Production Planning & Control, Aircraft Maintenance Scheduling & Control, Hangar Control Center, and an AOG Desk. It handled sophisticated aircraft maintenance involving fuel-leak repair, removal of outflew valves, and Boeing 747 rudder works with cherry pickers supplied by ground-equipment support. The fuel-leak repair would be done by a sheet-metal crew with access to the wing fuel tank, and sealant repair would be performed. The facility also had a dedicated wash dock. During the Third Islamic Summit held in January 1981, the Engine Overhaul Center handled incoming Grumman Gulfstream II/III and Cessna Citation aircraft from VIP flights. Most of the works were done on-field at the northernmost end of the apron beside the center.

It continued operations after the closure of the airport in May 1981. In the first quarter of 2005, it inaugurated a V2500 engine test unit used by MD-90 aircraft. By 2010, it carried five overhaul services and maintained 10 engines monthly. In September 2010, the CF34 General Electric engine was introduced to the center. Phasing out of the original facility in the old airport, construction of a new Jet Propulsion Center began at King Abdulaziz International Airport in September 2013. The consultant was Ghafari Associates, and it was planned for completion in July 2019 at a cost of 481.7 million riyals. An early inauguration was held in December 2023 for the new Engine Overhaul Center by Minister of Transport Saleh bin Nasser Al-Jasser. Construction was prolonged, and it was fully completed in May 2025 at a cost of 514.9 million riyals. The precinct is called the Maintenance Village.

=== USGS gravity station ===
Between 1958 and 1985, Jeddah International Airport has also served as a primary base for geophysical gravity surveying in Saudi Arabia. In 1958, the first national gravity-control system in Saudi Arabia was established by geophysicist Al K. Ghalayini using Worden gravimeters. In 1972-74, Vincent J. Flanigan and Mohamed N. Akhrass established 42 gravity base stations throughout Saudi Arabia, using uncalibrated Lacoste-Romberg gravimeters and gravity values based on the 1930 Potsdam data. Both systems were linked to a main station based at the airport. By 1977, both stations had been destroyed over time. From 23 January to 6 May 1977, the United States Geological Survey conducted the Greater Jeddah gravity survey, utilising two new gravity bases at the airport. The two stations—a marked point with a gravimeter—were designated JED APT and SPEC FLT. Station SPEC FLT was specifically located 3 metres east of the south edge the aircraft doorway on the east side of the Saudia Special Flight Services hangar. The hangar was located on the concrete apron. The station would be tied into the loop to back up USGS X—the primary station located at the USGS office in Jeddah. As the apron was resurfaced, the original altitude of the station was reported as uncertain. In June 1980, it was occupied and tied again as a backup excenter station, and was still reported as operational by 1985. During operations, Saudia's Special Flight Services division provided aircraft for USGS geophysicists.

=== Connections ===
Maintaining an entryway into the airport was also just as important, though rudimentary at its establishment. During the 1940s, the only paved road in Jeddah was Mecca Road, and a track was developed to connect King Abdulaziz's Khuzam Palace with the airport. The track intersected the eastbound Mecca Road, and evolved to become Palace-Airport Road. A second track ran westward from the airport into the city, passing by the Kandara Hotel and its district, the Tomb of Eve, and the Ghishla which used to function as barracks during Ottoman rule. This track would become Al-Matar (Airport) Road. By 1952, Al-Matar Road and Palace-Airport Road was paved amidst the growth of the airport, its junction becoming Pilgrim's Square. King Khalid Road was later established, forming most of Palace-Airport Road.

In response to the growing need for sufficient infrastructure, the construction of the Al Hagon Bridge, part of the Jeddah Internal Ways Project was awarded to the Arab contractors, Osman Ahmed Osman & Co. The bridge was completed in 1963 and linked Mecca to Jeddah Airport by a series of internal roads, having cost SAR 10.5 million.

== Aftermath & redevelopment ==
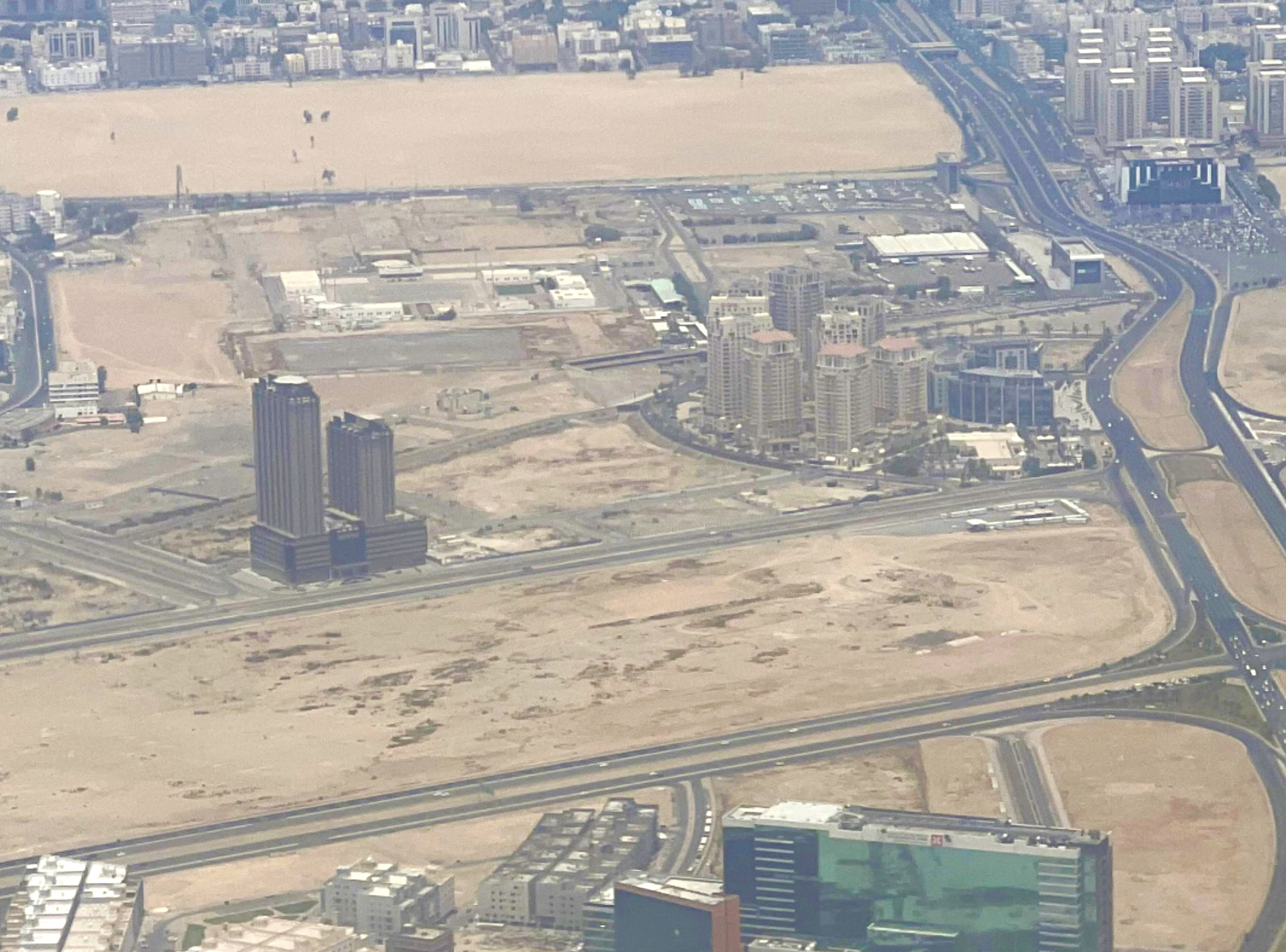
Aerial photo of the former airport. The large white flat building in the top right corner is the former terminal building, one of three that was built in 1978. In the center of the left side is a portion of the once 5-story Hajj accommodations complex.

In the first half of 1983, a Royal Order was issued to allow the appropriation of a portion of the former airport. The construction of an integrated medical city was to take place at the portioned land. Including the Jeddah Beach Hospital, it was to be known as the Health Services Centre, costing approximately six billion Riyals. Shortly after closure, a highway was quickly built across the former runways, with its tarmac laid through the old aircraft boneyard. Declassified satellite imagery dated to 1983 depicts that the runways were not demolished. In 1984-85, Dar Al-Hanan vacated the terminal to a new campus beside the Khuzam Palace, which was formerly contained within the King Saud Royal Complex. According to Google Earth imagery from 2000, faded runway markings of runway 15R/33L remained. Also, the original markings of runway 15/33, which by the time the airport closed was part of the apron, was also still visible.

In March 2005, Al-Oula Development Company held a major auction selling 888 plots of the former airport, spread on an area of 1,200,000 square metres (300 acres). In 2006, a proposal was made to construct an aviation museum in the former main headquarters building of the airport near the Al-Sharafiah district. The museum would chronicle the history of the Kingdom’s aviation, along with an exhibition of old photos, documents and models to display. The initiative was approved by Mayor Adel Faqeeh on 7 February, and initial studies soon followed. The area of the museum was to be fenced for construction. Before the museum's conception, the old control tower was already demolished, which could’ve been more authentic if preserved for the museum according to head of the General Administration of Tourism Sami Nawwar. However, a recreation of the control tower was to be built using the same architecture aspects, according to Faqeeh. According to Google Earth imagery from 2008-2009, the airport's two original hangars, dating from the airport’s establishment had been demolished. There was a mass deportation center for overstaying pilgrims, which was located adjacent to the Haji accommodations. In 2014, it was relocated to Al-Shumaisi near Mecca, and the old center and Saudia ticket sales office were subsequently demolished.

"The buildings started to lose its prominence with the opening of the present day King Abdul Aziz International Airport in the northern part of the city in 1981, and the Haj operations began getting more streamlined. The Saudi Arabian Airlines sales office was also in operation here till few years ago. But what was once a busy hub is now an edifice that reveals memories of the days gone by."

— The Saudi Gazette, 25 August 2017

In 2021, the old airport and the Hadj terminal was featured in an exhibition showcasing 13 historic sites in Jeddah. Currently on imagery dating 2024, only three hangars and smaller support facilities are still remaining, with all of the runways being demolished. King Khalid Road, the original airport road remains, along with another road called Al-Matar nearby the old airport, which was also used to access the airport. Majority of the eastern apron still exist but as a cricket ground. The southern parts of the main apron also survives as of 2025.

=== Aircraft boneyard ===
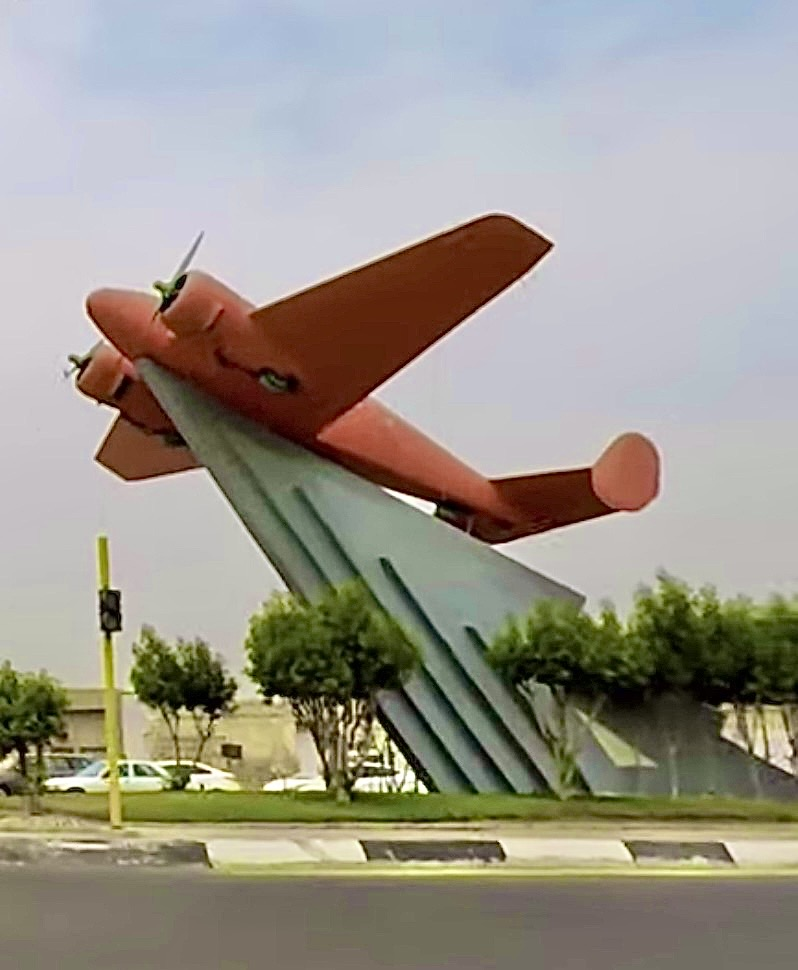
A Beech TC-45G Expeditor perched on a roundabout at Al Matar Road and King Khalid Road.

Located just outside of Jeddah International Airport was an aircraft boneyard, established shortly before the airport closed. In 1953, ten Temco T-35 Buckaroos armed with rockets and machine guns were delivered to Jeddah Air Base. The first aircraft dumps took place in 1975, which included nine complete airframes of the T-35 Buckaroos facing deterioration. The results were published in the April 1975 Air Pictorial.

Aircraft such as the Douglas A-26 Invader, North American T-28 Trojan, Douglas C-54 Skymaster and the Beechcraft T-34 Mentor have been decommissioned and dumped here. When the roads were paved across the former highway following closure, the abandoned aircraft became easily accessible. In the 1980s, the T-35 Buckaroos were dug out and salvaged to be restored, and a C-130 was donated to fly the parts to Dobbins Air Reserve Base. By the late 1980s, many of the aircraft were removed from the boneyard.

== Statistics ==
For its time, Jeddah International Airport was a popular airport in the Middle East. This is a list of how many passengers and cargo the airport served, as well as aircraft and transport movements:

Year	Passengers	Cargo (tonnes)	Aircraft Movements	Transport Movements
1950s	250,000			
1970	713,278	6,730	23,032	21,187
1974			43,800	
1975	2,562,000 / 2,538,674 *	13,681	58,957	47,690
1976	3,261,422 *	16,395	69,802	56,612
1978	4,735,000	38,073	23,185	
1979	5,707,000	47,080	32,948	
1980	7,645,000	58,231	42,704	
1981	7,143,000	75,533	44,807	

This list excludes transit passengers.

- Blue refers to Stroud's data, which excludes transit passengers.
- Green refers to the data from Länderbericht Saudi-Arabien 1984, which does not state whether transit passengers are excluded or included. It also includes both freight and mail, which is displayed in the cargo column, and only includes takeoffs and landings for aircraft movements.
- Yellow refers to overlapping data, in which Stroud's data is always displayed second.

=== Former airlines and destinations ===
The following is a list of former airlines and their destinations that served Jeddah International Airport as of March 1980 (asterisks refer to an unpublished en route stop on select flights):

Airlines	Destinations
Air France	Cairo^{*}, Djibouti, Paris–Orly
Air India	Bombay, Kuwait^{*}
Alia – Royal Jordanian Airlines	Amman
Alitalia	Rome
Austrian Airlines	Larnaca^{*}
Bangladesh Biman	Dubai
British Airways	London–Heathrow
China Airlines	Dhahran^{*}
Cyprus Airways	Larnaca
EgyptAir	Cairo, Sanaa
Ethiopian Airlines	Asmara
Garuda Indonesia	Abu Dhabi^{*}
Gulf Air	Bahrain
Iberia	Cairo^{*}
Iran National Airlines	Tehran
Iraqi Airways	Baghdad
KLM Royal Dutch Airlines	Amsterdam, Cairo^{*}
Korean Air	Bahrain^{*}, Dhahran^{*}, Zurich
Kuwait Airways	Kuwait
Libyan Arab Airlines	Damascus
Lufthansa	Athens
Malaysian Airline System	Kuala Lumpur
Middle East Airlines	Aden, Beirut, Khartoum
Nigeria Airways	Kano
Olympic Airways	Athens
Pakistan International Airlines	Karachi
Royal Air Maroc	Cairo
SAS Scandinavian Airlines System	Athens^{*}, Cairo^{*}
Saudi Arabian Airlines	Abha, Aden, Amman, Athens, Beirut, Bisha, Cairo, Damascus, Dhahran, Gassim, Geneva, Gizan, Hail, Istanbul, Jouf, Kano, Karachi, Khartoum, Kuwait, London–Heathrow, Medina, Nejran, Port Sudan, Riyadh, Rome, Sanaa, Tabuk, Taif, Tripoli, Tunis, Wedjh
Somali Airlines	Cairo, Mogadishu, Rome
Sudan Airways	Khartoum
Swissair	Dar es Salaam, Geneva, Zurich
Syrian Arab Airlines	Damascus
Tunis Air	Cairo
Türk Hava Yolları	Ankara
Yemenia	Athens, Sanaa, Taiz

== Accidents & incidents ==
- In the 1940s, a Saudi Arabian Airlines Douglas DC-3 experienced in-flight problems, leading to an emergency landing attempt at Jeddah Airport. The pilot entered a holding pattern due to the runway conditions, and afterwards safely landed the aircraft. Emergency response was swift, as fire trucks and ambulances were already waiting on the runway at the time. Word also spread around the airport that the plane had crashed. After the incident, the DC-3 was repaired and made serviceable by next morning.
- On 25 September 1959, a Saudi Arabian Airlines DC-4 registered as HZ-AAF departed from Jeddah International Airport and was headed to Riyadh International Airport. After taking off, the plane climbed abnormally high. Flight crew attempted to push the control column forward, so full forward trim and a power reduction were used to avert a stall, however, the aircraft stalled at a 90 degree angle. Unable to return to the runway, the DC-4 belly-landed near the airport. There were no fatalities out of its 72 occupants.
- On 13 June 1964, a Saudi Arabian Airlines Douglas DC-3/C-47A-20-DK registered as HZ-AAN departed Jeddah International Airport on a training flight. However, the aircraft lost control and plunged into the Red Sea about 100 kilometres (62 miles) south of the airport. Both pilots, the only occupants, were killed.
- On 24 June 1967, a Saudi Arabian Airlines Douglas C-47 registered as HZ-AAM suffered an electrical shortage during a sand storm, which caused the aircraft to crash at Khamis Mushait between Jeddah and Nejran, catching aflame in the process. It was en route to Jeddah International Airport from Nejran Airport, and 13 passengers and 3 crew of the 17 passengers onboard were killed. An American pilot named Robert Gardner was killed, while a Swiss passenger had escaped the flaming wreckage as a sole survivor, and was subsequently hospitalised.
- On 7 January 1972, a Saudi Arabian Airlines Convair CV-340-68B registered as HZ-AAU departed from Jeddah International Airport. However, its 1st engine suffered from engine failure, prompting an emergency approach to runway 33L. On final approach, its flaps were stuck at 17 degrees. Its 1st engine was on reverse thrust, and the aircraft skidded off the left side of the runway during a rollout. The nose gear struck an asphalt mound and collapsed. The cause was determined to be that the pilot was unaware of hydraulic system failure. No fatalities were reported out of its 15 occupants. HZ-AAU was written off due to the extent of the damages.
- On 9 December 1974, an Ilyushin Il-18D registered as YR-IMK, which was leased by EgyptAir, departed from Jeddah International Airport at 19:05 on a repositioning flight to Cairo. Shortly after takeoff, the plane lost radar and radio contact with the airport. Jeddah continued attempts to make radio contact with YR-IMK, and asked nearby planes in the area to also contact YR-IMK. However, it disappeared over the Red Sea. A search conducted by the Coast Guard and Royal Saudi Air Force commenced. Three witnesses were found by a helicopter crew, and reported that the plane turned sharply whilst in flames, before plunging into the sea. After search operations on 11 December 1974, only a cooler door, an oxygen mask, scraps of cloth and a sponge from a seat were found in the Red Sea. Authorities were unable to precisely locate the aircraft. All 6 occupants were dead. On 23 November, 1990, it was concluded that the cause of crash was likely caused either by an on-board explosion or a mid-air collision with debris.
- On 30 November 1979, a Saudi Arabian Airlines Boeing 707-373C registered as HZ-ACE suffered substantial damage to the fuselage after a heavy landing at Jeddah International Airport. The aircraft was written off due to the extent of the damages, and was subsequently scrapped for spare parts.

== In popular culture ==
- In 1973, Jeddah Airport was shown in many scenes in a short documentary film of Jeddah produced by Echo International Documentary Film. Footage included the inside of the ATC, aircraft landing, and pilgrims.
- In 1980, the British Docudrama Death of a Princess was filmed in Jeddah Airport to re-enact the scene of Princess Mishaal entering the airport after faking her death and disguising herself as a man to flee the country.
- Jeddah Airport is depicted in Turkish-British author Moris Farhi's 1984 political thriller novel, The Last of Days set in 1973.

== See also ==
- Darin Airport, Saudi Arabia’s first military airstrip.
- King Abdulaziz International Airport
