= AISJ =

AISJ may refer to:

- American International School of Jeddah, Saudi Arabia
- American International School of Johannesburg, South Africa
