= Darin Airport =

Darin Airport مطار دارين
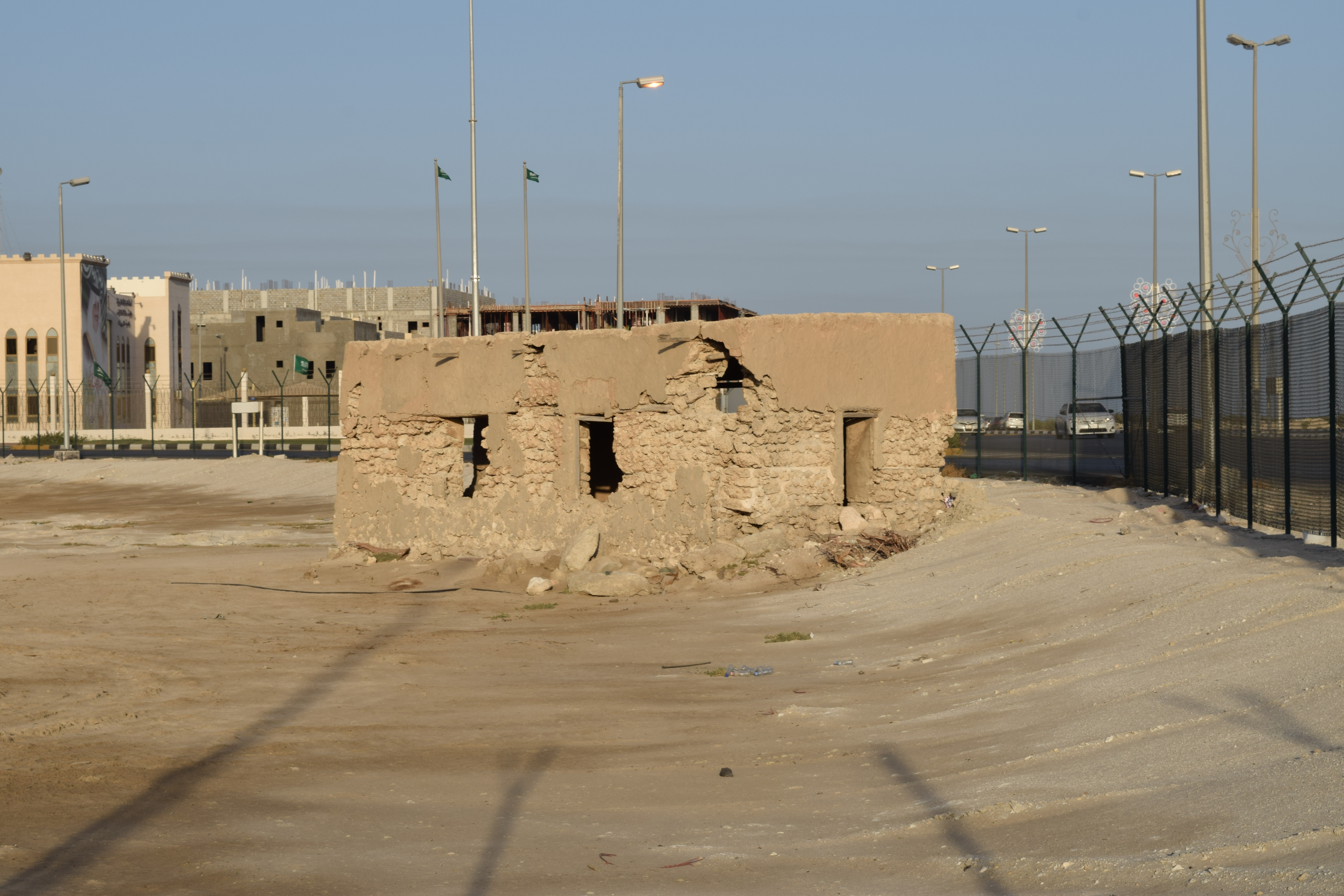
- IATA: none; ICAO: none

Summary
- Airport type: Defunct
- Location: Qatif, Saudi Arabia
- Opened: 1911
- Closed: 1932

Darin Airport, also known as Dareen Airport (Arabic: مطار دارين) was a military airport in the Eastern Province of Saudi Arabia. It was established around 1911 during World War I. It is considered to be the oldest and first airport in Saudi Arabia. Weekly flights once operated between Darin Airport and Qudaibiya Airport in Manama. The airport ceased operations in 1932 and was abandoned in 1939, leaving only a fuel storage room, isolated from the building and the runway, which was located 600 meters from the coastline.

== History ==
In August 1921, multiple aircraft were ordered and arrived at Jeddah from Italy and Egypt for the establishment of the Hejaz Air Force. Subsequently, a military airfield was established in Darin and Jeddah , with landing grounds at Riyadh and Taif. The first hands-on experience with aviation came when the Saudi government established a flight school on Darin Airport in 1929 and acquired four British-made Westland Wapiti Mark II aircraft. However, the project faced challenges, including technical difficulties with maintenance and spare parts. Consequently, the school and its four aircraft were relocated to Jeddah Airport on September 15, 1930.

=== Closure ===
Darin Airport was abandoned in 1939. Around 1963, remaining aircraft and ammunition stored at the airport were removed. The remnants of Darin Airport were visible until 1970 when the site was cleared by the Tarout Municipality. Today, only the fuel storage room remains and the site is designated as historical landmark.

== Layout ==
The airport originally consisted of three small rectangular rooms, two of which were adjacent. These rooms were built using mud, marine stones, and clay. Nearby, on the western side, stood a wooden pole called "Bandira," equipped with a kerosene lantern suspended by ropes to guide aircraft at night. The Bandira, set in a stone and mud marine base, was located over 100 meters west of the airport rooms and stood 20 meters tall. It was removed by the Tarout Municipality in 1970. A third, more remote room was situated northwest of the Bandira. This room, still standing today, recently contained disassembled parts of an old aircraft stored inside.
