= Skyview High School (Floris, Virginia) =

High school in Floris, Virginia

Location
- 2949 Education Drive; Floris, Virginia; 38°55′47.09″N 77°25′16.63″W

Information
- School type: Public, high school
- Founded: 2026; 0 years ago
- School district: Fairfax County Public Schools
- Principal: David Jagels
- Language: English
- Campus type: Suburban
- Website: skyviewhs.fcps.edu

Skyview High School is a public high school in Floris, Virginia, United States. It is part of the Fairfax County Public Schools system.

== History ==
Skyview High School opened in August 2026.

The school was built on a 34-acre (14 ha) campus formerly occupied by King Abdullah Academy. It features two cafeterias and an indoor swimming pool.

Skyview High School is a comprehensive high school, offering special programming in robotics, technology, and aerospace.

First year enrolment was limited to 500 grade nine students and 500 grade ten students. The school is expected to serve 2,000 students in subsequent years.
