= Floris, Virginia =

- Census-designated place
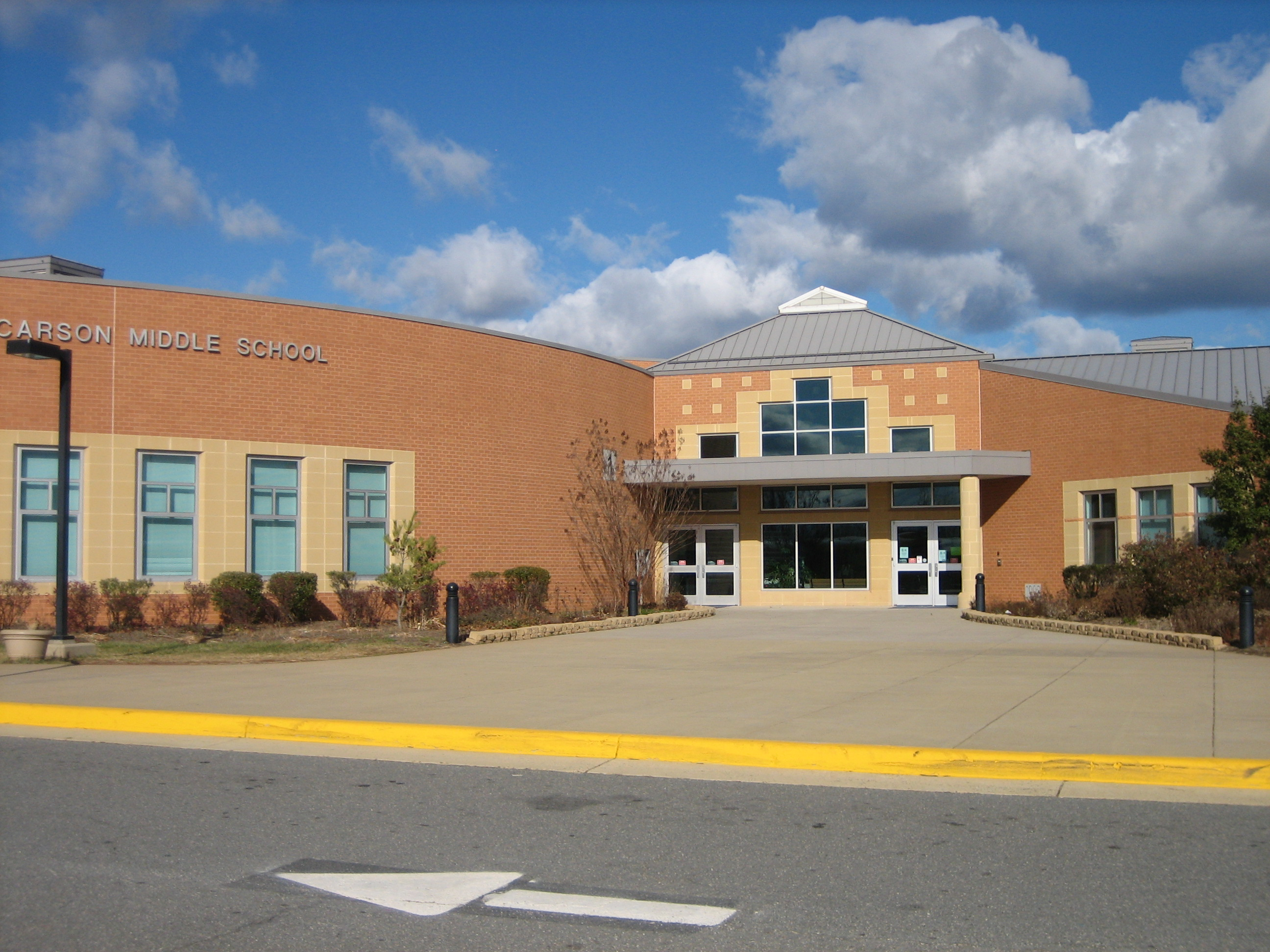
- Entrance of Rachel Carson Middle School

- Location within Northern Virginia Location within Virginia Location within the United States
- Coordinates: 38°56′13″N 77°24′47″W
- Country: United States
- State: Virginia
- County: Fairfax

Area
  - Total: 2.78 sq mi (7.20 km^{2})
  - Land: 2.76 sq mi (7.16 km^{2})
  - Water: 0.019 sq mi (0.05 km^{2})
- Elevation: 360 ft (110 m)

Population (2020)
  - Total: 8,341
  - Density: 3,017/sq mi (1,164.9/km^{2})
- Time zone: UTC−5 (Eastern (EST))
  - Summer (DST): UTC−4 (EDT)
- FIPS code: 51-28528
- GNIS feature ID: 1495548

Floris is a census-designated place (CDP) located within the Oak Hill area of Fairfax County, Virginia, United States. The population at the 2020 census was 8,341.

== Geography ==
Floris is located in northwestern Fairfax County, south of Herndon, around the intersection of Centreville and West Ox roads. It is bordered by McNair to the north, Reston to the northeast, Franklin Farm to the south, and by Virginia State Route 28 to the west, separating the community from Washington Dulles International Airport. The center of Herndon is 3 miles (5 km) to the north, Fairfax is 10 miles (16 km) to the southeast, and Washington, D.C., is 26 miles (42 km) to the east.

According to the U.S. Census Bureau, the Floris CDP has a total area of 2.8 square miles (7.2 km^{2}), of which 0.02 square miles (0.05 km^{2}), or 0.66%, is water.

== Demographics ==
Historical population
Census	Pop.	Note	%±
2010	8,375		—
2020	8,341		−0.4%
U.S. Decennial Census; 2010 2020

Floris was first listed as a census designated place in the 2010 U.S. census.

Floris CDP, Virginia – Racial and ethnic composition Note: the US Census treats Hispanic/Latino as an ethnic category. This table excludes Latinos from the racial categories and assigns them to a separate category. Hispanics/Latinos may be of any race.
Race / Ethnicity (NH = Non-Hispanic)	Pop 2010	Pop 2020	% 2010	% 2020
White alone (NH)	4,667	3,874	55.73%	46.45%
Black or African American alone (NH)	291	355	3.47%	4.26%
Native American or Alaska Native alone (NH)	17	8	0.20%	0.10%
Asian alone (NH)	2,782	3,283	33.22%	39.36%
Native Hawaiian or Pacific Islander alone (NH)	5	3	0.06%	0.04%
Other race alone (NH)	17	49	0.20%	0.59%
Mixed race or Multiracial (NH)	285	371	3.40%	4.45%
Hispanic or Latino (any race)	311	398	3.71%	4.77%
Total	8,375	8,341	100.00%	100.00%

At the 2020 census (some information from the 2022 American Community Survey) there were 8,341 people, 2,667 housing units and 2,434 households residing in the CDP. The population density was 3,022.1 inhabitants per square mile (1,164.9/km^{2}). The average housing unit density was 966.3 per square mile (372.5/km^{2}). The racial makeup of the CDP was 47.24% White, 4.30% African American, 0.12% Native American, 39.47% Asian, 0.06% Pacific Islander, 1.82% from other races, and 6.99% from two or more races. Hispanic or Latino of any race was 4.77% of the population.

Of the households, 75.4% were married couple families, 8.2% were a male family householder with no spouse, and 14.5% were a female family householder with no spouse. The average family household had 3.34 people.

The median age was 43.6, 24.9% of people were under the age of 18, and 13.3% were 65 years of age or older. The largest ancestry is the 11.8% who had Irish ancestry, 33.9% spoke a language other than English at home, and 30.9% were born outside the United States, 76.8% of whom were naturalized citizens.

The median income for a household in the CDP was $231,161, and the median income for a family was $231,161. 6.2% of the population were military veterans, and 76.2% had a bachelor's degree or higher. In the CDP 2.2% of the population was below the poverty line, including 3.1% of those under the age of 18 and 0.9% of those aged 65 or over, with 2.7% of the population without health insurance.

=== 2010 census ===
The population at the 2010 census was 8,375.

== Education ==
Floris is within Fairfax County Public Schools. Rachel Carson Middle School is in Floris. Skyview High School, a public high school, is in the former King Abdullah Academy.

Private schools:

- Nysmith School (PK-8)
- King Abdullah Academy (Closed)
