= Norm Doerr =

Norman Bernard Doerr
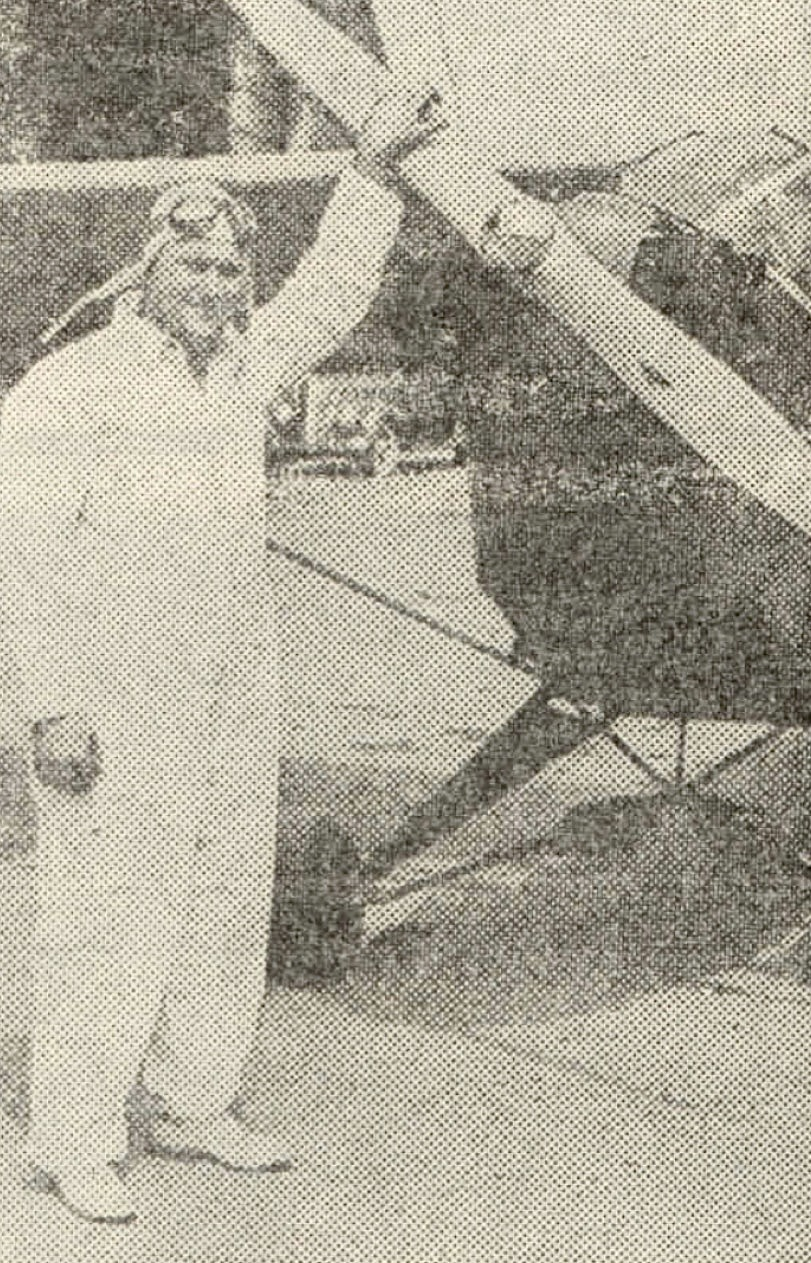
- Norm Doerr and his midget aeroplane at Sky Harbor Airport in Illinois, after raising a refuelling endurance record the day prior.
- Born: May 8, 1911; Illinois, U.S.
- Died: March 30, 1980 (aged 68)
- Occupations: Flight instructor and captain
- Years active: 1928 — 1971
- Known for: 1937 record attempt and early training role in Saudia
- Title: Captain Norman B. Doerr

Norman Bernard Doerr (8 May 1911 - 30 March 1980) was an American aviator and inventor.

He served as a flight instructor in many flying clubs, and setting a solo refueling endurance record for light airplanes in 1937. During the 1940s, he developed a new padded parachute back and served as a test pilot for Convair. In 1955, he joined Saudia and trained the airline's first generation of pilots.

== Life ==
=== Early life ===
Norman Bernard Doerr was born on 8 May 1911 in Illinois, having two sisters, one named Lillian Ethel Doer.

=== Flying career ===
At age 16-17, Doerr began flying in 1928 with flying clubs around Chicago, eventually becoming a flight instructor. He owned a St. Louis C-2-90 (registered NC560N), which was cancelled on 17 August 1934. On 5 July 1937, Doerr set a solo refuelling endurance record for light airplane after remaining airborne for 24 hours and two minutes. William Kneubueler was his assistant, whom was strapped to the front fender of an automobile holding a canvas bag with a ring containing the fuel tin. Doerr flew 15 feet above, dropping a wire hook and snared the ring. The record took place at Sky Harbor Airport, breaking Evelyn Hudson's previous of 19 hours and 57 minutes. Afterwards, Hudson attempted to raise the record, staying up for 33 hours and nine minutes in September 1937.

=== Captain ===
By 1940, Norman B. Doerr served as chief pilot and instructor of the Aeronautical Country Club in Ravenswood Airport, Chicago. In the club, he developed the 'Pioneer P1-B-24,' a padded parachute pack that would sit behind the pilot and act like a cushion. The invention retained the regular safety of carrying a parachute. He later joined the commercial flying industry as a pilot for Northwest Airlines. During World War II, he initially served as a test pilot for Convair, and achieved captain rank in Consairway. On 30 November 1946, Doerr filed a patent for his invention of a Baby Supply Cabinet, which incorporate heating and cooling equipment and an electrical system for infant supplies. He filed a second patent on 14 February 1947 for the invention of a Bottle Heater. The first was granted on 5 February 1952, and the second was granted on 13 February 1951. In 1955, Doerr joined Saudia, serving as a flight instructor and supervisor. In 1959, when the Saudi Pilot Training Institute was established at Jeddah Airport, Doerr was appointed as supervisor for the school.

Remaining in Saudia until 1971, Norman B. Doerr retired from commercial flying and later joined the Orange County-San Diego Wing, a regional branch of the OX5 Aviation Pioneers. He would establish in himself as a close member, and planned the 1976 National Reunion in San Diego throughout December 1975. By December 1978, Doerr was Wing President, and organised a Christmas party at Oceanside Elks Lodge, attended by 136 members with Christmas carols performances for 45 minutes.

At age 68, Norman B. Doerr passed away on 30 March 1980. He was buried at Glen Abbey Cemetery, Bonita in California.
