= Jeddah Beautification Project =

1970s public art initiative in Saudi Arabia

The Jeddah Beautification Project, also known as the Jeddah Tajmil, refers to a public art initiative launched in the 1970s to transform the streetscapes of Jeddah, Saudi Arabia. It is famous for leading to the installation of dozens of large-scale, open-air public sculptures created by international artists. These sculptures were predominantly installed in the Jeddah Corniche. Over the decades, these sculptures faced deterioration from the harsh arid climate.

== History ==
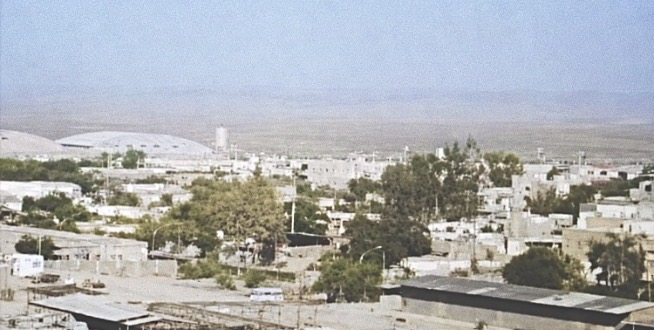
Al-Kandara district in Jeddah during the 1970s.

The Jeddah Beautification Project commenced in September 1974 by the mayor, Mohamed Said Farsi and Spanish architect, Julio Lafuente who led the initiative. They envisioned "an arena of public art" across Jeddah, leading to the commissioning of a large-scale public art project. Farsi began with working with Lebanese artists Aref El Rayess and Shafiq Mazloum, and Egyptians Mustafa Senbel and Salah Abdulkarim. Eventually, famous sculptors around the world, including Joan Miró, César Baldaccini, Alexander Calder, Victor Vasarely, and Jean Arp, were commissioned to develop over 400 artworks. Lafuente's own designs were modelled after baroque Rome architecture, where monuments provided a vivid, recognisable guide around unnamed roads for both tourists and locals. Farsi would also encourage private businessmen to donate their own sculptures, monuments, and fountains. All sculptures evolved around traditional Saudi culture, the industrial past of Jeddah, and the scientific achievements of the Muslim world.

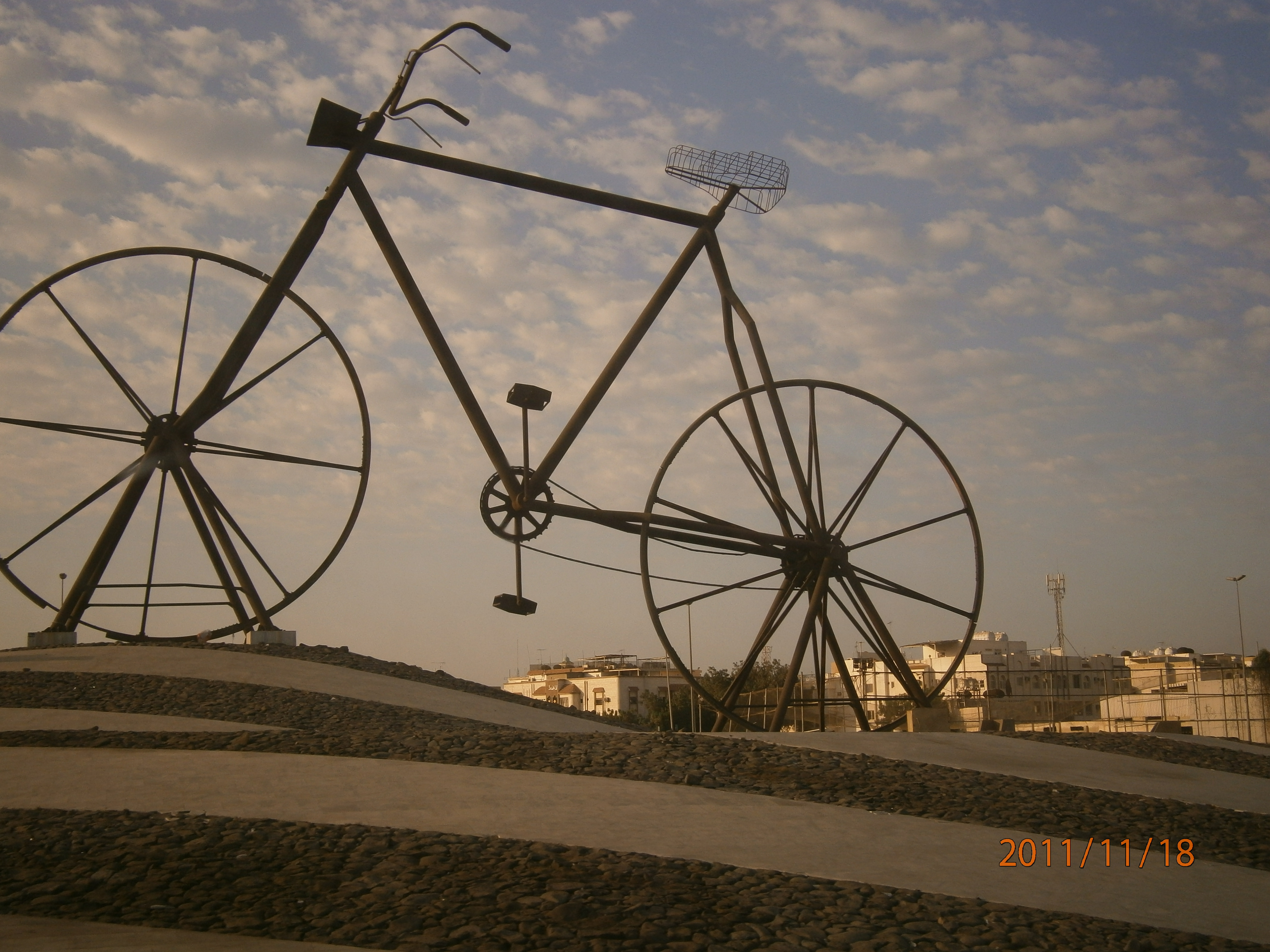
The Monument to the Unknown Cyclist by Julio Lafuente.

The installation of the first sculpture began in November 1974 by South Korean engineering firm, Samhwan Construction Inc. The mayor requested that the project be completed by 20 December when the annual hajj was set to begin, and the company responded by extending works into the night. Numerous torch lights were used, and King Faisal had happened to come across the procession. Moved by the dedication, he later ordered that more projects be undertaken by Samhwan. On a broader scale, the Jeddah Beautification Project also led wide-spread landscaping projects funded at $45 million. This prompted the creation of greener streetscapes and planted urban environments, including the introduction of plants acclimated to arid conditions. Over six million trees were planted, creating about 6 square kilometres of green shade cover from a city that almost had no trees. Furthermore, up to 300 public gardens, 50 landscaped playgrounds, 60 public fountains, and 3,000 municipal flower boxes were earmarked for installation.

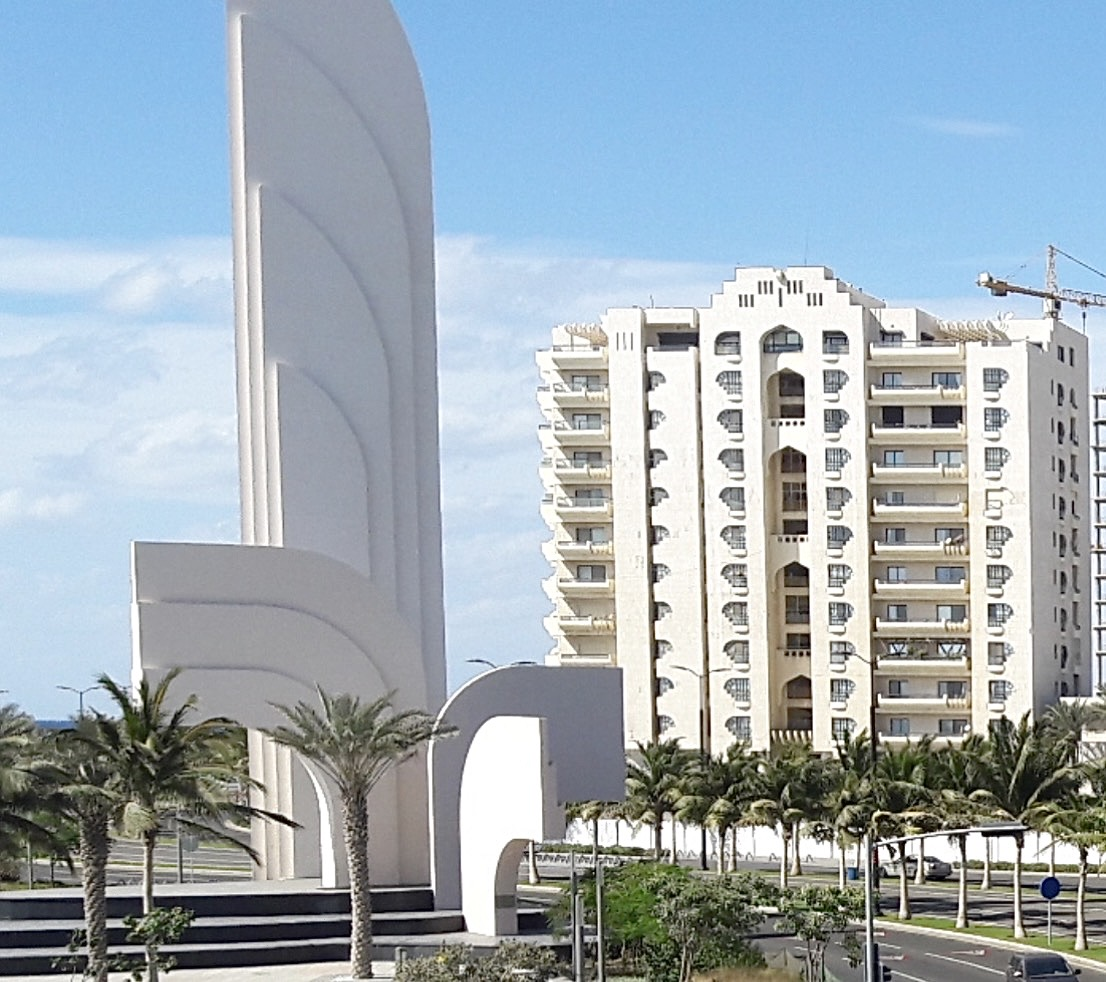
The Seagull by Egyptian artist and city planner Mustafa Senbel.

By the late 1970s, the Jeddah Beautification Project would influence other Gulf cities to develop their own elements of urban centers containing modern art. The Jeddah Beautification Project continued in the 1980s, with 95,179,768 riyals awarded by the Jeddah Mayoralty in 1984.

=== Present ===
By the early 2000s, the sculptures began to deteriorate due to the salt-laden winds from the Red Sea. Subsequently, in 2011, independent art organization Art Jameel and the Jeddah Municipality collaborated on a restoration project to preserve the sculptures. Additionally, 20 were relocated for exhibition in the open-air Jeddah Sculpture Museum. The museum was opened in September 2013.

== Works ==
The following is an incomplete list of sculptures completed under the initiative. Over the years, many sculptures have since been dismantled or relocated.

Title & Artist	Inception	Synopsis	Materials & Dimensions	Location	Footnote
Jeddah Sculpture Museum
Altercations in Space by François Kovacs	1982	Strongly influenced by the artist's career in medicine, this sculpture features a diagonal geometric abstract cube. It is modelled after the spongy structure seen in cancellous bone.	Bronze, 110cm high	Relocated to Jeddah Sculpture Museum in 2011.	
Balance in the Air by Vasarely	1982	This sculpture features two interlocking geometric shapes resembling 3D isometric cubes. The lower cube uses a palette of cooler colours, while the upper cube transitions into warmer shades.	Enamelled steel, sculpture is 250cm high	Relocated to Jeddah Sculpture Museum in 2011.	
Flexibility of Balance by Calder	1974	Among the last works by Calder, this sculpture features three large, red stabiles. Another version is located in the Calder Foundation in New York City.	Three painted steel sheets, 300cm high.	Relocated to Jeddah Sculpture Museum in 2011.	
Al Andalus Street
Optical Composition by Vasarely	1980s	Featuring vibrant violet and turquoise colors, this sculpture is composed of intersecting geometric forms arranged in a rotational, pinwheel composition around a central point.	Enamelled steel	Corner of Al Andalus Street and Al-Seif Street.	
Al-Qiblah by Lafuente		Directly influenced by the Winged Victory of Samothrace, assembly took place in Italy spanning five years.	260 pieces of carved travertine marble	21°32′32.26″N 39°09′16.51″E	
The Four Lanterns by Lafuente		This sculpture features four large internally lit Mamluk mosque lamps hung by steel tension cables.	Steel and stained glass	21°32′38.94″N 39°08′02.22″E	
Al Balad District
Unnamed by Abdulhalim Radwi	1981	Abstract stone sculpture featuring detailed engravings, symbolising modern Islamic expressionism mixed with brutalist folk art. It was entirely obscured by kiosks and buildings until recent demolitions in 2021 uncovered the sculpture.	Stone		
Al Falah Street
Horse and Jockey (unknown artist)		This sculpture features a large, galloping horse using interlaced ribbons of bronze sheets. On the top of the horse is the rider, which was rather made solid.	Bronze	Located in the corner of Al Falah Street and Stadium Street south of the city.	
Al Kurnaysh Branch Road (Corniche Road)
Balance in the Air by Shafiq Mazloum		One of many by Mazloum utilising recycled materials, this sculpture embodies constructivist minimalism by using steel beams positioned at counter-balancing diagonals. It is completely painted in an industrial blue hue.	Steel, 3 metres tall	The exact location on the Corniche is unclear, although it is given at Al-Ruwais.	
Builder's Plumbline by Mustafa Senbel		Built as a tribute "to the achievements of the master builders of the ancient world," this sculpture features three curved, steel columns each hanging a large plumb bob. As it was built sturdy, the plumb bobs do not sway in the wind. Formerly located in a roundabout, it was unmoved and included in the 2021 Jeddah Art Promenade development.	Steel	Jeddah Art Promenade 21°38′41.96″N 39°06′05.95″E	
Fish by Al Hindi and Hesham Banjabi		Originally located in a canal, this sculpture features a large steel cut-out of a fish's two halves.	Steel	The sculpture was dismantled and later reassembled during works on the South Obhur waterfront project. 21°43′18.94″N 39°06′52.32″E	
Koranic Verse by Lafuente		Standing on a concrete base, this bronze calligraphic sculpture features a verse translating to "Surely thou art upon a mighty morality."	Concrete and bronze	The exact location on the Corniche is unclear.	
Large Ball Bearing Symbols by Ottmar Hollmann	1982 or prior	Hence its name, this sculpture features a large, cast hollowed sphere with curved vertical ribs and claw-like legs that flare outward to the ground. Locally, it is known as 'The Spaceship' or 'The Octopus'.	Cast alloy	Middle Corniche Park 21°31′23.82″N 39°09′02.89″E	
Pure Abstraction by Aref el Rayess		Another example of abstract expressionist, this sculpture features rectilinear cutouts with sudden angular shifts. It is entirely painted white.	Stone	Al Hamra Corniche Park	
Ship and Sail (unknown artist)		Anchored on stylized blue, layered concrete waves, this installation features a red traditional dhow sculpture with white calligraphic sails. The sculpture is entirely made of painted reinforced concrete. Recently, it was repainted.	Reinforced concrete	Located in the middle of Al Safina roundabout. 21°44′23.92″N 39°07′37.28″E	
The Seagull by Mustafa Senbel		Considered one of the largest abstract sculptures standing at 55 meters tall, this sculpture features a large reinforced concrete wing and two shorter curved pieces. The wing's face features sun rays, flying seagulls, and Arabic calligraphy. The curved pieces resembles the splash of the sea as a seagull dives to catch prey. Taking three years to construct, it is in the style of Abstract Expressionist and Modernist.	Reinforced concrete	21°35′25.41″N 39°06′26.54″E	
The Solar Clock by Walter Ferro	1982	Located behind the Large Ball Bearing Symbols sculpture, this monument features two large obelisks displaying the time and temperature using solar-powered technology. In January 1982, Ferro was commissioned by the Mobil Oil Corporation, and its design was finalized by February. After the obelisk was built, the sculpture was then donated to the municipality for installation.	12.1m in height, 1.2m x 1.8m solar panel	Middle Corniche Park. 21°31′24.76″N 39°09′01.77″E	
Unification Fountain (The Shahada al-Tawhid) by Lafuente		Once-located in the middle of a roundabout, it is a granite and marble calligraphic sculpture positioned over a body of water. Based off the Shahada from the Five Pillars of Islam, the verse expresses "There is no god but God. Muhammad is the messenger of God." The sculpture was unmoved during a corniche redevelopment spanning 2015–17.	Granite and marble	21°35′52.27″N 39°06′22.43″E	
Unnamed by Lafuente		This sculpture features an upward-curving crescent made of reinforced concrete resembling sails, with two boats paralleling it and another two side-by-side boats behind the installation. It was assembled using a Coles mobile crane. Google Earth imagery shows that one of the back boats was removed in 2008-9.	Four boats and reinforced concrete	21°32′11.69″N 39°09′20.53″E	
Al Makarunah Road
Engineers' Tools by Hisham Benjabi and Ali Amin		Reflecting Jeddah's modernisation projects, this sculpture feature an enormous protractor, ruler, and compass.	Steel, marble and concrete	Located at Engineers' Square. 21°35′12.87″N 39°11′12.87″E	
Al Nakheel Road
Solidarity by Salah Abdulkarim	1981	A modern adaptation to girih, this open sculpture features a white, interlaced diamond lattice column. It sits on a polished granite/marble plinth. Another sculpture of similar design was erected in Multan, Pakistan.	Reinforced concrete and granite/marble	21°40′56.38″N 39°06′20.62″E	
Hira Street
Fruit Boat by Mohamed Bayoumi and Dr. Ali Bayoumi	1977	Among Jeddah's common coastal theme, this sculpture rather features the sculpture of a fruit-bearing blue and white striped boat. It features oversized fruits overflowing the boat, including apples, bananas, pomegranates, and grapes. The sculpture is mounted on a concrete plinth over a blue tiled base representing the ocean. In September 2008, a week-long restoration led by the Alwan Maintenance Company oversaw repainting aging colours and repairing broken tiles.	Concrete and tiles	21°36′26.17″N 39°07′34.86″E	
King Abdulaziz Road
The Globe by Lafuente		Built in Italy, this sculpture features a large, framed glass globe with a surface area of 600 square metres. It is perched on a concrete base painted blue. The sculpture is often illuminated at night, showing Mecca as the light and heart of Islam.	Concrete and glass	Located on the roundabout at the intersection between King Abdualziz Road and Assalam Street.21°39′52.31″N 39°06′38.88″E	
King Fahd Street (Setten Road)
Monument to the Unknown Cyclist by Lafuente	1982	One of Jeddah's most iconic landmarks, this sculpture features a large, free-standing bicycle in the middle of a roundabout. It was built out of scrap metal from an old marble factory owned by Muhammad bin Ladin. It is also simply known as The Bicycle.	Metal, white granite, and blackstone, measures 15m high and 25m long	Al-Darraja Square 21°34′04.88″N 39°11′00.29″E	
The White Steed by Rabi al-Akhras		Built using local stone, this sculpture featured abstracted horse heads of different sizes beside stylized swords and spears. Due to religious objections surrounding figurative art, the sculpture was erased in 1991. There are no known photographs of this work other than a replica.	Stone	The White Steed Roundabout at Hira Street and King Fahd Street.21°36′57.87″N 39°10′00.73″E	
Sails by Mustafa Senbel		Also known as Ships, this sculpture was organised by the Municipality of Jeddah to replace the prior White Steed installation. It featured a large open-frame steel sail surrounded by three red and orange steel boats. The roundabout was painted in flowing shades of blue to resemble waves, thus it was renamed to 'Sails'.	Steel	21°36′57.87″N 39°10′00.73″E	
Palestine Street
Column of Light by Aref El Rayess	1981	This sculpture, 28 metres tall, features four aluminium columns each symbolising a letter from the Arabic calligraphy spelling of "Allah".	Aluminium	21°32′10.87″N 39°13′05.61″E	
Swords of God by Aref El Rayess		Standing 30 metres tall, this sculpture features three abstract columns intending to spell out "Allah" in Arabic calligraphy. Originally intended to be built of marble, El Rayess instead built it using a steel frame clad in aluminium due to its practicality.	Steel and aluminium	The intersection of King Fahd Street and Palestine Street. 21°40′56.38″N 39°06′20.62″E	
Prince Sultan Street
The Verse Boat by Lafuente	1981	Inspired by Hassan Massoudy's book, Calligraphie Arabe Vivante, this installation features a calligraphic bronze sculpture. The verse is taken from Al-Isra' 17:80 of the Quran.	Bronze, total weighing 20 tonnes	21°40′07.74″N 39°07′17.97″E	
Prince Faisal Ibh Saud Street (Al Tahliah Street)
Accident!!! (Crazy Speed) by Lafuente		Considered one of Jeddah's most famous sculptures, this work features five colourful cars half-positioned inside a large block of reinforced concrete.	Reinforced concrete and five cars.	Located on the Northern Corniche, Obhur district until relocation in late 2021. Presently located on a roundabout at Prince Faisal Ibn Saud Street. Current: 21°37′00.61″N 39°06′37.07″E; Former: 21°37′31.78″N 39°06′19.21″E	
Condenser 2 by Lafuente	1977	Plans were first conceived in 1976, originally known as Kindasa. This sculpture features stacked recycled pieces of boilers from a desalination plant.	Scrap metal	21°32′33.53″N 39°08′39.99″E	
Magic Carpet (unknown artist)		With a concrete dome base adorned in white and blue mosaic resembling clouds, this sculpture features a sedan riding a rigid, Persian carpet.	Concrete, mosaic, and a car.	Located on a roundabout at the intersection of Prince Faisal Ibn Saud Street and Jubayr Ibn Al Harith Street. 21°37′23.39″N 39°06′35.07″E	
