= Islamic Saudi Academy =

Former university preparatory school in Virginia, U.S.

Coordinates: 38.73146°N 77.101954°W

- الاكاديمية الاسلامية السعودية
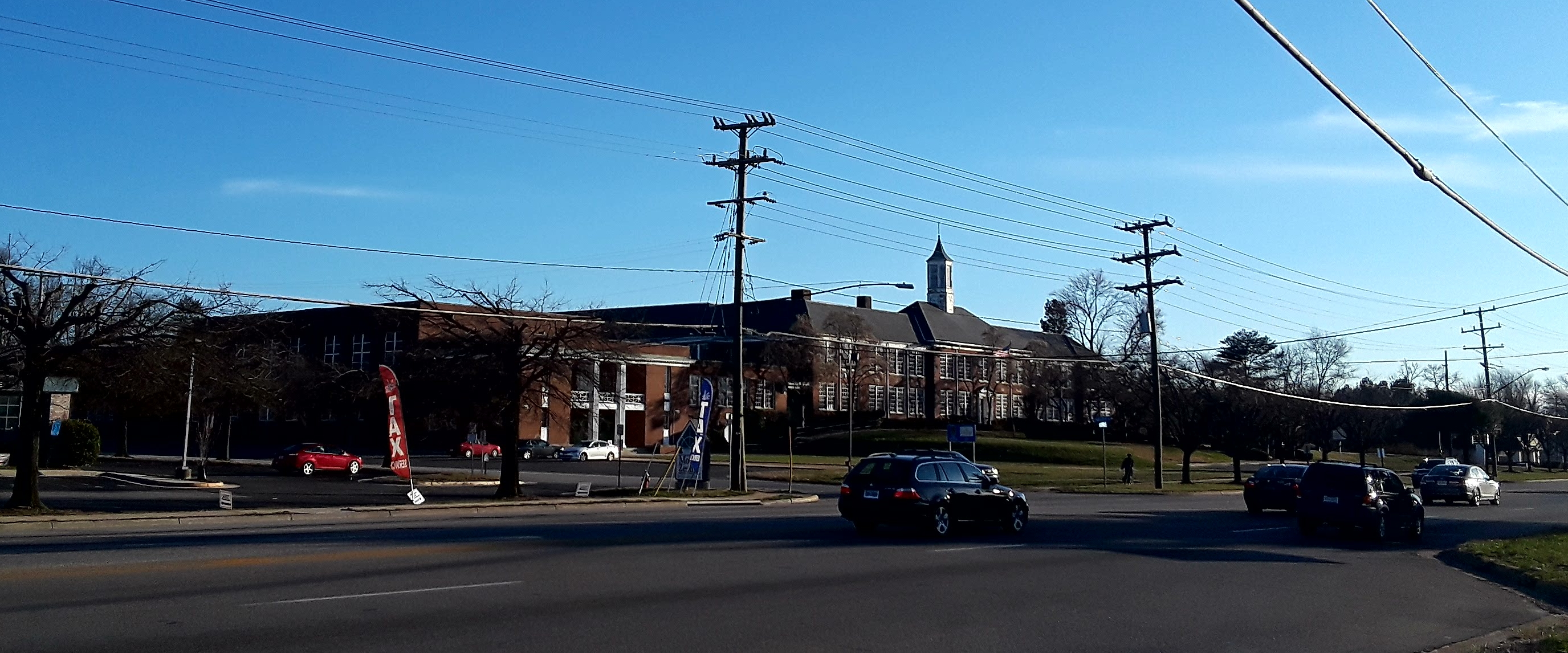
- The former Islamic Saudi Academy, originally Mount Vernon High School, in Mount Vernon, Virginia, in 2018

Location
- Islamic Saudi Academy; Main: 8333 Richmond Highway, Mount Vernon, Virginia 22309; West: 11121 Pope's Head Rd, Fairfax, Virginia 22030

Information
- Funding type: Private
- Founded: 1984
- Closed: 2016
- Principal: Abdulrahman Alghofaili
- Grades: Pre-K–12
- Language: English and Arabic
- Campus: Suburban
- Website: www.saudiacademy.net

The Islamic Saudi Academy of Washington (Arabic: الاكاديمية الاسلامية السعودية) was an International Baccalaureate (IB) World university preparatory school in Northern Virginia, accredited with the Southern Association of Colleges and Schools and authorized by IB in December 2008. It had classes from pre-kindergarten to twelfth grade, and had a final enrollment of more than 1,200 students.

The academy was funded by the Embassy of Saudi Arabia in Washington, D.C. In 2011, ISA graduated its first international baccalaureate class. Four students received their full IB diploma and one of them was able to earn bilingual diploma. As of 2007, approximately 30% of the roughly 1,000 students were Saudi Arabian citizens. The school closed in 2016, replaced by the new King Abdullah Academy later that year. That school closed in 2025.

== Overview ==
The school was founded in 1984 by the Government of Saudi Arabia. Located in Fairfax County, Virginia, the school offered instruction from pre-kindergarten through twelve. The school was bilingual, with mandatory classes in English and Arabic. However, it also offered other languages such as Spanish.

Campuses in Fairfax County, Virginia
Campuses

== History ==
The school was founded in August 1984 by a decree of King Fahd and originally served grades K–6. The Saudi government purchased the 34-acre campus of the former Fairfax Christian School in Fairfax from owner Robert L. Thoburn for $3 million as a site for the school.

The school proved so popular that by 1986 the school rented the former Dunn Loring Elementary School, which had closed in 1978, to provide space for its burgeoning student body.

Following the leasing of the Dunn Loring site, the school expanded its education program to include grades 7–12.

When the lease on the Dunn Loring site expired, the school leased the former Mount Vernon High School in Mount Vernon, Virginia, near Alexandria, spending $5 million to renovate the nearly 50-year-old building. The academy moved into the Alexandria area site in 1989. For much of its history it maintained two campuses: the main campus near Alexandria and the West Campus in Fairfax Station, near Fairfax.

In December 2015 there were plans for the school to move to a new campus in Floris, near Herndon. The original ISA closed in June 2016, and the new King Abdullah Academy near Herndon opened in Fall 2016.

=== King Abdullah Academy ===
King Abdullah Academy, or KAA, opened in fall 2016 under the direction of the Saudi Arabian Cultural Mission to the United States. Its goal was to provide a U.S.-based, English-language curriculum rooted in Islamic values and Arabic language instruction. It primarily served children of Saudi diplomats and expatriates residing in the greater Washington, D.C. area. The school was built on a 40-acre (16 ha) campus previously zoned for educational use. As such, no additional hearings were required by the Fairfax County Board of Supervisors. At the time of planning, Supervisor Michael R. Frey reported no public opposition to the site.

Located near Washington Dulles International Airport, the King Abdullah Academy campus featured modern academic buildings, a soccer field, walking trails, outdoor classrooms, and an Olympic-style swimming pool. The school was purpose-built with security and architectural standards similar to those used for diplomatic and international facilities.

KAA offered instruction in English, Arabic, and Islamic studies. The lower school (K–5) was co-educational, while middle and high school students were taught in gender-segregated classes.

In January 2025, the school announced that it would close permanently at the end of the 2024–2025 academic year due to financial and administrative sustainability concerns. According to a letter from the board, the school had been unable to establish a viable long-term funding model to maintain operations independently of Saudi governmental support. The closure affected approximately 450 students and 160 staff members. Legal proceedings were initiated to investigate potential violations of the federal WARN Act, as employees were allegedly notified with fewer than 67 days' notice.

In June of 2025 it was announced that Fairfax County Public Schools in Virginia would purchase the campus, buildings, and equipment for $150 million with the intention of opening a new public high school for the county.

== Programs and activities ==
The school's curriculum included Islamic studies, Islam for beginners, Arabic language, Arabic ASL, Mathematics, Science, Language Arts, Computers, Art, English, Social Studies, and Physical Education. The school also had an Advanced Placement Program and an English as a second language program. The school also had the IB program and offered IB English A1 + B, IB Arabic A1+B, IB Biology HL, IB Math HL + SL, IB Art, IB History HL+SL, and IB Psychology, so its students can graduate with an IB diploma.

The ISA is a member of the Northern Virginia Independent Athletic Conference (NVIAC), and participates in the basketball and soccer leagues, fielding both boys' and girls' varsity teams. The school has 3 football fields. The school was a supporter of the Mount Vernon Youth Athletic Association, an all-volunteer community program that uses athletics to teach discipline and good citizenship to area youths. They also had a Teen center for students to improve at sports.

The school participated in various educational and leadership-oriented extracurricular activities. There was an annual science fair and a Shakespearian drama program. Students were active participants in the Model United Nations program, the Presidential Classroom program, and various other programs.

== Controversy ==
ISA had been accused of promoting religious intolerance.

On February 23, 2005, the day after Ahmed Omar Abu Ali was indicted on terrorism charges, New York Senator Charles Schumer issued a press release questioning whether the ISA was "another madrassa" (i.e. a school teaching radical Islamic theology. Madrassa is the Arabic word for school, but in English the term usually refers more narrowly to Islamic institutions of learning.) Senator Schumer sent letters to Saudi Prince Bandar bin Sultan and U.S. Attorney General Alberto Gonzales.

In October 2007, the U.S. Commission on International Religious Freedom urged the US State Department to shut down ISA on the grounds it teaches religious intolerance. The Commission accused the ISA of promoting religious intolerance that could prove a danger to the United States. In response ISA officials stated that they had removed offensive passages from the books the previous summer, but did not explain why the Saudi embassy officials had refused to personally make the books available to the Commission. Officials of ISA criticized the USCIRF, saying that the panel unfairly damaged the school's reputation, and invited the commission members to review the books; an offer which was refused. According to the Commission chair he did not take up the academy's offer of making the book available because academy officials wanted mutually acceptable scholars and translators to review the textbooks.

=== Textbook passages ===
In June 2008, another USCIRF report stated that textbooks at ISA teach students that it is permissible for Muslims to kill adulterers and converts from Islam, and also teach that, "The Jews conspired against Islam and its people." ISA officials issued a press relate stating that the aforementioned textbooks are sorely outdated, and once again invited the USCIRF to visit its campus to review more recent materials. The rejection of such an offer it stated would lead the ISA to doubt the intentions of the investigation.

=== Land lease ===
ISA's campus was leased from the Fairfax County government on a year-to-year lease, and the issue has occasionally been raised that perhaps Fairfax should not continue leasing the land if the ISA's textbooks do promote terrorism or intolerance. On June 23, 2008, Fairfax County's Board of Supervisors made a formal request to U.S. Secretary of State Condoleezza Rice to determine if Fairfax County should continue to lease the land.

== Notable individuals connected to ISA ==
- Ahmed Omar Abu Ali, valedictorian of the academy in 1999, was convicted in 2005 on charges of providing material support to the al Qaeda terrorist network. He was sentenced to 30 years in prison. His defense team argued that his first confession in Saudi Arabia had been extracted under torture, but the judge ruled his confession admissible. Courts have upheld his conviction but pushed for a longer sentence.
- Mohammed Osman Idris and Mohammed el-Yacoubi, both former students of ISA, were denied entry to Israel in December 2001, under suspicion of planning to carry out a suicidal martyr attack. The two were departing JFK International Airport when a letter was found in el-Yacoubi's luggage which was characterized as "a farewell letter...for a suicide mission in the name of Jihad." The two hastily boarded a flight to Jerusalem, leaving behind their belongings. However, when the flight arrived in Israel, the two were detained and sent back to the U.S. Idris was later charged with lying to a federal grand jury investigating terrorism.
- Susan L. Douglass, a former social studies teacher at the school, wrote social studies textbooks for the International Institute of Islamic Thought.
- Democratic Governor of Virginia Abigail Spanberger taught at the school between 2002 and 2003.

== See also ==
American schools in Saudi Arabia:

- American International School – Riyadh
- American International School of Jeddah
