= American International School of Johannesburg =

School in South Africa

Location
- Plot 160, Scorpion Trail Street, Knopjeslaagte; Midrand, Gauteng, 1682; South Africa; 25.9462°S 28.0385°E

Information
- School type: International School
- Established: 1982; 44 years ago
- CEEB code: 640582
- Grades: Pre- K3 to Grade 12
- Language: English
- Campuses: Pretoria and Johannesburg
- Website: https://www.aisj-jhb.com/

The American International School of Johannesburg (AISJ) is an international school serving students from Pre-Kindergarten (3 year olds) through Grade 12 in South Africa. It operates two campuses: one in Johannesburg and another in Pretoria. The Johannesburg campus offers a boarding program for students in Grades 8 - 12.

The school follows an international curriculum, offering the Primary Years Programme (PYP) and International Baccalaureate (IB).

== History ==
The American International School of Johannesburg (AISJ) was founded in 1982 to provide an American‑style education and international curriculum for expatriate families living in Johannesburg, South Africa.

The Pretoria campus, which serves Pre‑K3 to Grade 8, opened in August 2002.

AISJ became authorised to offer programmes of the International Baccalaureate (IB) in February 1994, and continues to provide the Primary Years Programme (PYP), Middle Years Programme (MYP) and Diploma Programme (DP) alongside an American‑style high school curriculum.

The school’s Johannesburg campus also offers a boarding programme for students in Grades 8–12, attracting families from across South Africa and internationally due to its combination of academic pathways, pastoral support and community life.

Notable alumni include Chumani Mokoena, who attended AISJ before studying nuclear engineering at the University of Wisconsin–Madison. Student athlete Enzokuhle Mweli also attended AISJ and was named to the All‑Star Team at the 2025 NBA and FIBA Basketball Without Borders Africa camp.

== Pretoria campus ==
American International School of Johannesburg Pretoria campus

Location
- 153 Sunrise Road, Olympus AH; Pretoria, Gauteng, 0081; South Africa; 25°48.095′S 28°19.539′E

Information
- Type: International school campus
- Grades: Pre-K3–8

The Pretoria campus of the American International School of Johannesburg serves students from pre-kindergarten through eighth grade.
