= Hejaz Air Force =

Component of the armed forces of the Kingdom of Hejaz

- القوات الجوية الحجازية
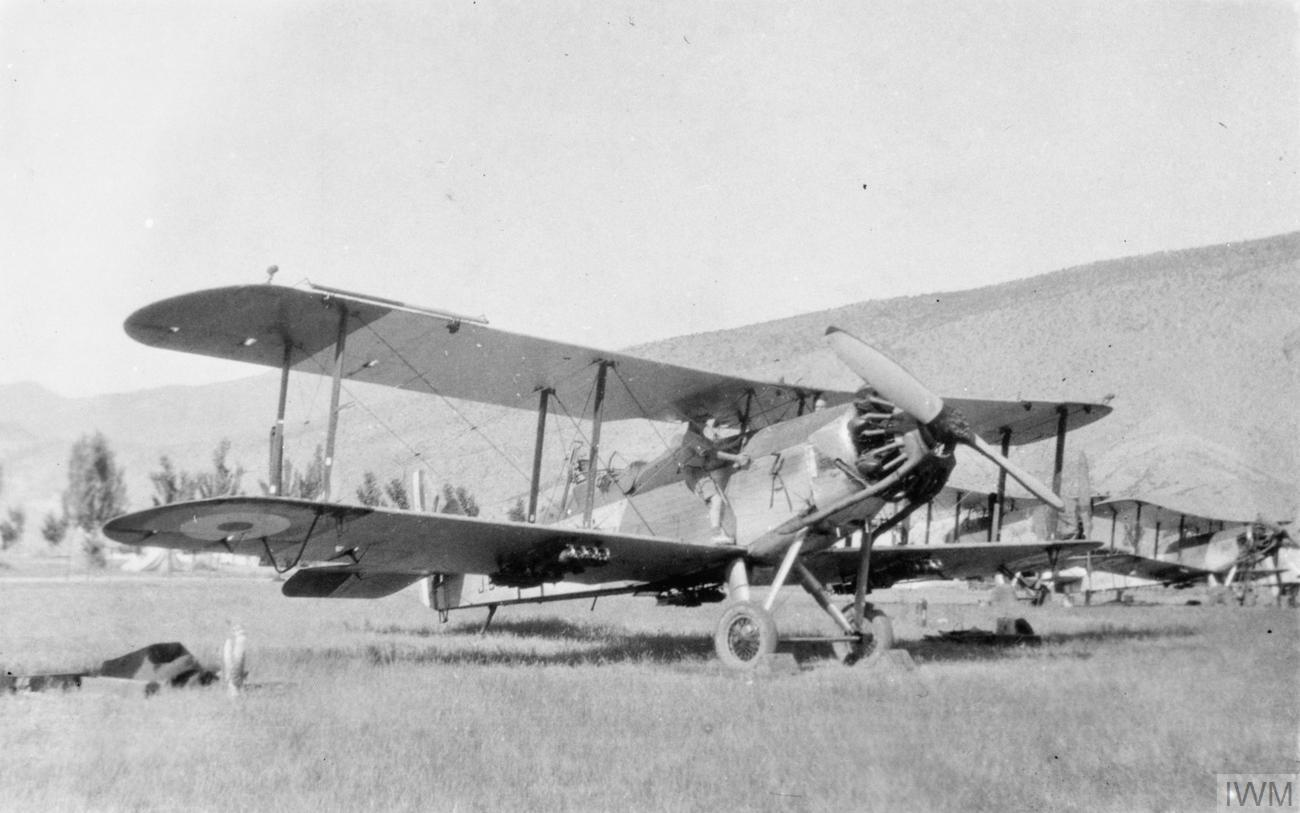
- Westland Wapiti IIA of the type operated by the Hejaz Air Force
- Active: 1921–1932
- Disbanded: 1925 ( Hejaz); 1932 ( Hejaz and Nejd)
- Country: Kingdom of Hejaz (1921–1925); Kingdom of Hejaz and Nejd (1926–1932)
- Allegiance: Hussein Bin Ali (1921–1925); Ibn Saud (1926–1932)
- Branch: Air Force
- Role: Aerial Warfare
- Size: 2 operational aircraft, 6 pilots (1922)
- Nickname: Hejaz Flying Corps
- Engagements: Battle of Mecca; Battle of Jeddah

Aircraft flown
- Airco DH.9/DH.9C, Caudron G.3, Westland Wapiti

The Hejaz Air Force (Arabic: القوات الجوية الحجازية) or Hejaz Flying Corps (Arabic: فيلق الطائر الحجازي) was the aerial component of the armed forces of the short-lived Kingdom of Hejaz and its successor the Kingdom of Hejaz and Nejd. Claiming to be the oldest Air Force on the Arabian Peninsula, the service was a very small entity, numbering at most nine aircraft at any time. It operated intermittently between 1921 and 1932, battling with staff shortages and aircraft availability; often only two aircraft were operational at any given time. The personnel came from many nations, with pilots coming from Germany, Greece, Italy, Russia and the United Kingdom, as well as from the kingdom itself after the flight of the first Arab pilot, Abdul Salam Sarhan, in 1923. It engaged in aerial reconnaissance and bombardment to support the army against the much larger land forces of Ibn Saud during the Hejaz-Nejd War, including bombing attacks on Jeddah and Mecca. Its successor is the Royal Saudi Air Force.

== History ==
=== Foundation ===
Flag of the Kingdom of Hejaz

On 3 January 1917, the Allied Powers of France, Italy and the United Kingdom recognised Hussein bin Ali as the first King of the Hejaz. He had been an ally of the Allied Powers during the First World War from 10 June 1916, when he launched the Battle of Mecca against the forces of the Ottoman Empire, the first attack of the Arab Revolt, in an attempt to forge an independent Arab state on the Arabian Peninsula. The new monarch had seen the effectiveness of air power, particularly the use of reconnaissance in support of troops by the Palestine Brigade of the Royal Flying Corps and X Flight's aerial bombardment of the Hejaz Railway. Soon after the end of the Arab Revolt and the conclusion of the Middle Eastern theatre of World War I, he created the Hejaz Air Force, which therefore claims to be the oldest Air Force on the peninsula.

Soon, the king ordered new aircraft from both Italy and the United Kingdom for his new entity, which was also called the Hejaz Flying Corps. The first, two Airco DH.9 and two Armstrong Whitworth F.K.8 bombers, along with four spare engines, were exported by Hugo Schumacher of Schumacher & Lavison in Cairo and arrived on 6 August 1921. They were followed on 16 August by the arrival of six French aircraft licence-built in Italy, four Le Rhône-powered Caudron G.3bis general purpose aircraft and two Fiat-powered Fiat SIA.5 trainers. The Caudrons were originally claimed to have been procured for Somaliland to introduce an airmail service but were redirected and sold by Tullio Pastori to bolster the new air force. There was proposed purchase of French SPAD aircraft at the same time, but none were delivered. Two further German aircraft, identified as an 'A G' and an 'Albatross', were in Medina in 1921. They were likely to be an AEG C.IV spotter and an Albatros D.III scout left in the new country by the retreating Ottoman Aviation Squadrons, but there is no record of either being airworthy or flying.

The first flight, of a Caudron, took place at Jeddah in September 1921. Airfields at Mecca and Ta'if were prepared and the first flight to Ta'if took place in October 1921. The Caudron crashed, as did the first DH.9 on the same route. These were the only operational aircraft at the time. The lack of available aircraft was a continual problem. In February 1922 the Air Force was reported to have only two aircraft in good condition, a DH.9 in Jeddah and a Caudron at Ta'if. In addition, one DH.9 was inoperable, one Caudron was under repair and another Caudron was termed 'useless'. The F.K.8 and SIA.5 were still unassembled. Only with the arrival of a new batch of three second-hand DH.9 aircraft, including two DH.9C cabin biplanes, on 22 November 1924, could the force be considered operational.

=== Personnel challenges ===
At the same time, King Hussein recruited personnel from around the world. On 29 July 1921 Captain Brooke, formerly of the Royal Air Force and accompanied by T. E. Lawrence, arrived, met with the King at Jeddah and started to create the infrastructure for the air force. Staff were very international. The chief mechanic, Maximov, was from Russia and the chief pilot, Leonida Schiona, from Italy. Another Russian, Nikolai Naidenov, was also a pilot. They were joined on 5 January 1922 by two more Russian pilots, another Russian mechanic, a Greek pilot and a Greek mechanic. By that time, Brookes had already left for Egypt, the harbinger of a persistent problem the small force had retaining pilots. The rest soon followed.

Retaining staff was a constant challenge. New recruits arrived from many countries, but morale was so poor few stayed for long. There was also a challenge with competency. For example, of the Russian pilots who arrived in January 1922, one crashed on his first flight and the other claimed to be an expert in seaplanes and incapable of flying from land. In fact, when a new mechanic named Klibensky arrived on 8 April 1922, he found he was the only extant member of the air force. One solution was to train indigenous pilots. 11 April 1923 saw the first flight of Abdul Salam Sarhan, who was followed by Hassan Nazer on 3 August 1924.

=== Action ===
Despite these challenges, Hejaz Air Force did take an active part in the defence of the realm in the Hejaz-Nejd War between Hejaz and the Sultanate of Nejd. Ibn Saud attacked Ta'if on 29 August 1924 and the Ikhwan quickly proved more than a match for the Hejaz forces. The air force was called in to support the outnumbered Hejaz troops. During the Battle of Mecca, a lone pilot, a White Russian émigré named Shirkoff, undertook reconnaissance sorties twice daily with an Arab observer. The airmen also undertook bombing missions by the simple expedient of throwing shells or grenades over the side of the aircraft. A bombing raid took place on Mecca on 3 January 1925. These makeshift bombs were also a huge hazard, killing Shirkoff and two crew members on 18 January during the Battle of Jeddah when their DH.9C aircraft exploded and crashed while flying over an enemy camp. These proved to be the air force's only fatalities while flying in action. However, crashes had destroyed all but one of the fleet's aircraft by the end of May 1925. The arrival of six second-hand DH.9 aircraft with twelve Lewis machine guns, 120 cases of ammunition and 500 bombs on 20 August, along with an influx of German pilots and crew provided by Steffen & Heyman of Berlin gave the force a much needed boost but it was insufficient to stem the tide and, when Ali bin Hussein capitulated on 21 December 1925, the kingdom ceased to exist as an independent entity.

=== Rebirth and subsequent development ===
When he was crowned King of Hejaz on 8 January 1926, Ibn Saud pardoned the Air Force personnel and many remained in service. Although a new combined Kingdom of Hejaz and Nejd was declared a year later on 28 January 1928, the title of Hejaz Air Force continued to be used in official documents into the 1930s.

Wing-Commander F. W. Stent was commissioned to survey the existing fleet; he found only two aircraft were serviceable and a new batch was ordered. The aircraft offered was the Westland Wapiti, a general purpose design that used many components from the DH.9. Four were delivered by air from Iraq on 4 January 1930 by British pilots accompanied by six mechanics to form the nucleus of the reborn force. The service's bad fortune continued. An attempt to found a new central hub on Tarout Island in 1930 was a failure due the logistical challenges, as was a new flight school at Jeddah for lack of personnel. Once again, almost the entire staff left. To boost morale, a demonstration flight was ordered on 13 September 1931. The first pilot to be asked, a Syrian, refused as he had never before flown the Wapiti and was flogged for insubordination. C. L. Lowe, the one remaining British pilot, was ill and confined to quarters but their German colleague, Kurt Krakowsky, who was suffering from dysentery, was dragged from his sick bed by fifty troops, took off and fainted, crashing the aircraft. Within a week, Lowe had also been dismissed and, for practical purposes, the service ceased to exist.

The successor for the Hejaz Air Force was the Royal Saudi Air Force, founded on 22 September 1932 when the Kingdom of Hejaz and Nejd was merged into the Kingdom of Saudi Arabia. The new entity took over the remaining aircraft. Flying resumed on 2 July 1934, as did accidents as one of the first pilots almost immediately taxied a Wapiti into a wall.

== Aircraft ==
Aircraft	Image	Origin	Type	First delivery	Total delivered	Notes
Airco DH.9		United Kingdom	Bomber	6 August 1921	9	Received in batches in 1921, 1924 and 1925.
Airco DH.9C		United Kingdom	Bomber	22 November 1924	2	Used by the Kingdom of Hejaz against the Sultanate of Nejd.
Armstrong Whitworth F.K.8		United Kingdom	Bomber	6 August 1921	2	Received by the Kingdom of Hejaz from the United Kingdom.
Caudron G.3		Italy ( French license)	General purpose	16 August 1921	4	The first aircraft flown by the Air Force. Received by the Kingdom of Hejaz from Italy.
Fiat SIA.5		Italy ( French license)	Trainer	16 August 1921	2	Acquired by the Kingdom of Hejaz from Italy.
Westland Wapiti		United Kingdom	General purpose	4 January 1930	4	Aircraft used by the Kingdom of Hejaz and Nejd. One example preserved in the Saqr Al-Jazira Aviation Museum.

The Ottoman Empire left at least one German aircraft in the Hejaz after the First World War. However, there is no report of any of these serving in the Air Force.
