= American International School of Jeddah =

Private school in Jeddah, Saudi Arabia

- Jeddah, Saudi Arabia

Information
- Type: Private
- Established: 1952
- Superintendent: Robert Rinaldo
- CEEB code: 692125
- Grades: Day Care - Grade 12
- Gender: Co-educational
- Enrollment: 1500+ students
- Area: 50,000 square meters (540,000 sq ft)
- Website: aisj.edu.sa

The American International School of Jeddah (AISJ; Arabic: المدرسة الأمریکیة العالمیة بجدة), or the "American School" in short, is an international school with American curriculum in Jeddah, Saudi Arabia. Established in 1952, the American International School of Jeddah is a U.S. accredited Pre-K - 12 college preparatory institution.

== History ==
It opened in 1952 as the Parent Cooperative School (PCS), with an initial class of 40 students. The school opened to serve children of Trans World Airlines (TWA) employees from the US brought to Saudi Arabia to establish Saudia Airlines, as well as other children. The lack of a formal American curriculum school in Jeddah was an issue TWA employees faced because they needed schools for their children. Parents then formed the Parents Cooperative School (PCS, founded in 1952), in which they volunteered to teach students using a home school curriculum (American based). When the expatriate community kept expanding with time, the school began to notice a rapid growth, and therefore built a new facility in 1968, and again in 1975.

In 1976, the North Campus (NCS) was built (by the Raytheon compound) in order to accommodate the rising number of students. By 1985 the school changed its name to Saudi Arabian International School (SAIS), and by the year 2000–2001, it had its first 12th grade graduation, becoming the first international school in Jeddah that had a diploma program. Until 2004, the school was under the direct auspices and sponsorship of Saudia Airlines, children whose parents are expatriate workers for Saudia Airlines such as pilots and engineers go to school at SAIS where mostly live in Saudia City, Khaledeyah district, as the housing compound of Saudia Airlines expatriates.

After 2004, The school changed its name to the American International School of Jeddah (AISJ) after Saudia officially announced that they would no longer continue their sponsorship of the school, due to their need to focus solely on the airline business. Since 2005, the school has been run as an independent not-for-profit entity.

The current campus opened in 2019. Zuhair Fayez Partnership designed the facility.

The International Baccalaureate Organization, in 2021, gave AISJ the permission to offer the International Baccalaureate program, which would begin in 2022.

== Accreditation and affiliations ==
As of 2020, the school is accredited and/or in partnership with the following associations:

- The Saudi Arabian Ministry of Education
- Middle States Association of Colleges and Schools (MSA-CESS)
- Near East South Asian Council of Overseas Schools (NESA)
- American School Counselor Association (ASCA)
- Principals Training Center (PTC)

== Facilities ==
In January 2019, AISJ moved to its new purposefully-built campus in the up-and-coming AUC District. The current facility has a capacity of 1,750 pupils and has a total of 50,000 square meters (540,000 sq ft) of space.

The campus includes strategically designed classrooms with learning centers and group work areas, spacious Early Childhood classrooms, and fully-equipped science labs.

There are two large Library areas, each with private meeting spaces and large group project areas. The 650-person theatre-style auditorium features a performance stage, an orchestra pit, and an underground practice room. The campus also features modern Athletic Facilities which include two gymnasiums, indoor and outdoor tracks, a full-length soccer field, a shaded swimming pool, an aerobics room, and tennis courts.

== See also ==
- Americans living in Saudi Arabia
- King Abdullah Academy, a Saudi Arabian school near Washington, DC
  - Islamic Saudi Academy, the predecessor of KAA
- List of schools in Saudi Arabia
