= Jeddah Air Base =

Former air base in Jeddah, Saudi Arabia

Jeddah Air Base
- قاعدة جدة الجوية
- Part of Jeddah International Airport
- Al-Kandara, Jeddah in Saudi Arabia
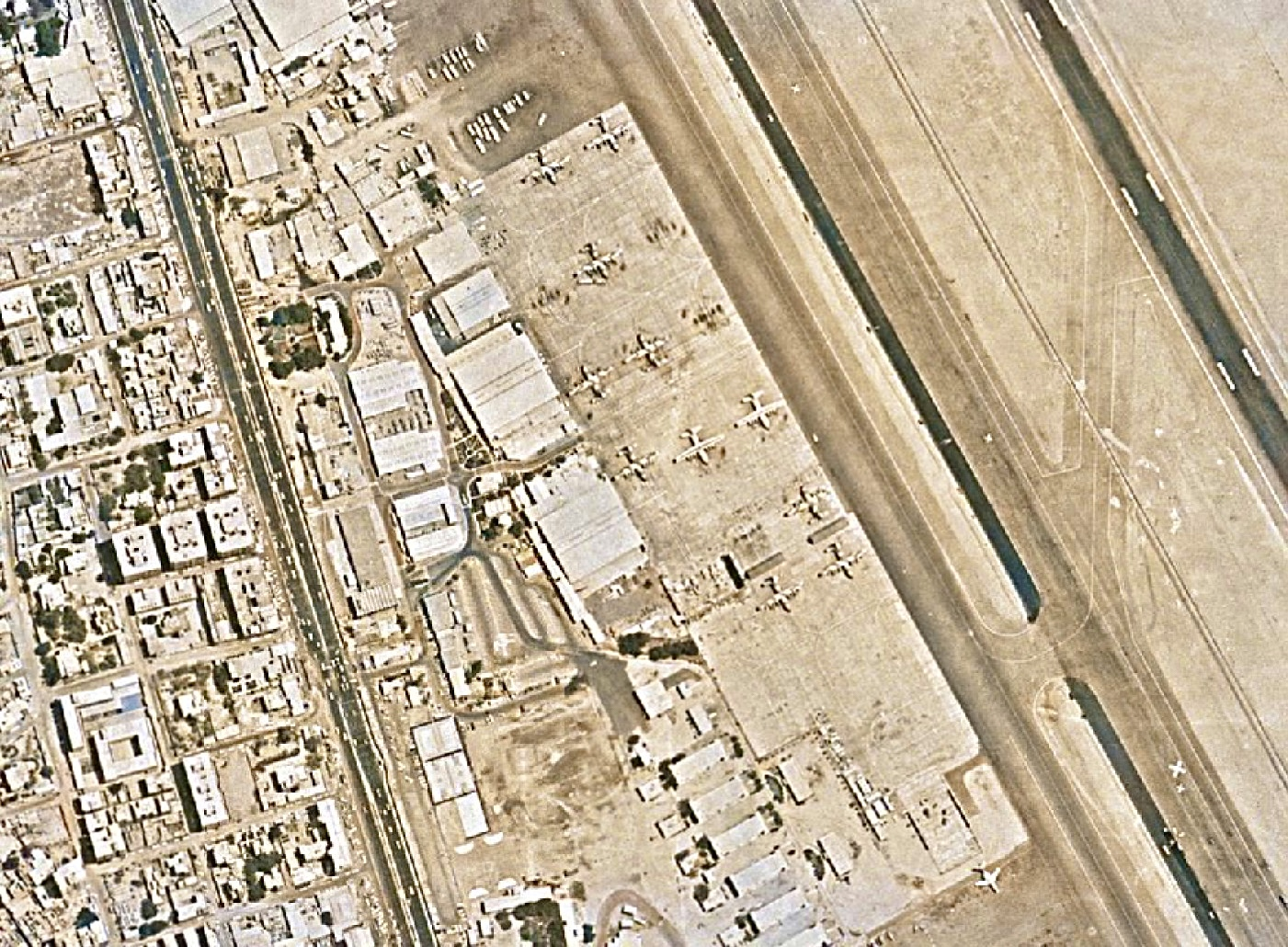
- Aerial imagery depicting Jeddah Air Base in 1979.

Site information
- Type: Defunct
- Owner: Ministry of Defense
- Operator: Royal Saudi Air Force

Location
- Shown within Saudi Arabia
- Coordinates: 21°29′38″N 39°12′27″E

Site history
- Built: 1921
- In use: 1921 – 1925 (Hejaz Air Force); 1936 – 1983 (Royal Saudi Air Force)

Airfield information
- Identifiers: IATA: ~~XZF~~, ICAO: ~~OEJD~~
- Elevation: 12 metres (39 ft) AMSL

Jeddah Air Base (Arabic: قاعدة جدة الجوية), formerly known as Kandara Aerodrome, was a Royal Saudi Air Force (RSAF) base which shared its runways with Jeddah International Airport. It served as the birthplace and headquarters of the RSAF from 1952 until 1962, and mainly held transport and tanker squadrons. After the airport closed, the RSAF relocated to King Abdullah Air Base.

== History ==
=== Hejaz Air Force ===
On 6 August 1921, the first aircraft deliveries approved by British authorities were made to Jeddah, arriving aboard the SS Tantah from Egypt. In August 1921, a further six aircraft arrived at Jeddah from Italy, which were 4 Caudron G.3 with 120–130 hp Le Rhône engines and 2 Maurice Farman trainers with 100 hp Fiat engines. Subsequently, two military airfields were established at Jeddah and Darin in Qatif, with landing grounds at Riyadh and Taif.

By early September 1921, a Caudron was assembled and flew three local flights around Jeddah. However, in October 1921, it crashed during takeoff on a return flight from Taif to Jeddah, and was left there for repairs. On 22 November 1924, steamship SS Nore arrived at Jeddah, landing three second-hand Airco DH.9 aircraft. Two aircraft were DH.9C variants, fitted with enclosed cabins for two passengers. During the Battle of Jeddah that took place within the Saudi conquest of Hejaz, the airfield flew reconnaissance and bombing missions, and also leaflet-dropping sorties, mainly targeting Mecca and Bahra using Airco DH.9 and DH.9C aircraft. On 3 January 1925, bombs flown from Jeddah were dropped over Nejd forces in Mecca. Russian pilot Shirokov flew daily reconnaissance missions from Jeddah using DH.9s, however, he was killed on 18 January 1925, when a bomb exploded prematurely inside the aircraft while in flight over Najdi army camps. On 6 February 1925, Jeddah was subjected to heavy artillery bombardment as Nejd forces advanced to within a few miles of the city. In December 1925, Jeddah was captured and the airfield remained inactive.

=== Early establishment ===
In 1932, the Kingdom of Saudi Arabia was established by King Abdulaziz after uniting the Hejaz and Nejd. In 1933, Italian advisers were contracted to take the place of British personnel following the expiry of British contracts, and the construction of a new airfield at Jeddah began. In 1934, the Civil Aviation Administration was established in Jeddah to oversee aviation operations. It was equipped with six aircraft and a group of military officers. On 18 March 1936, an aviation school was first established in Jeddah under the supervision of Italian instructor Captain Chico. Later on during 19 April, HRH Prince Faisal bin Abdulaziz visited the school to inspect its activities. To allow the establishment of the aerodrome, HRH King Abdulaziz donated his villa to the Civil Aviation Administration. Subsequently, a landing ground measuring a square kilometer was laid in the vicinity. On 21-22 September 1936, Kandara Aerodrome and the Kandara-based Arabian School of Aviation were inaugurated, attended by Faisal bin Abdulaziz Al Saud, who was Minister of Foreign Affairs at the time. However, the landing ground had not come into use immediately after inauguration.

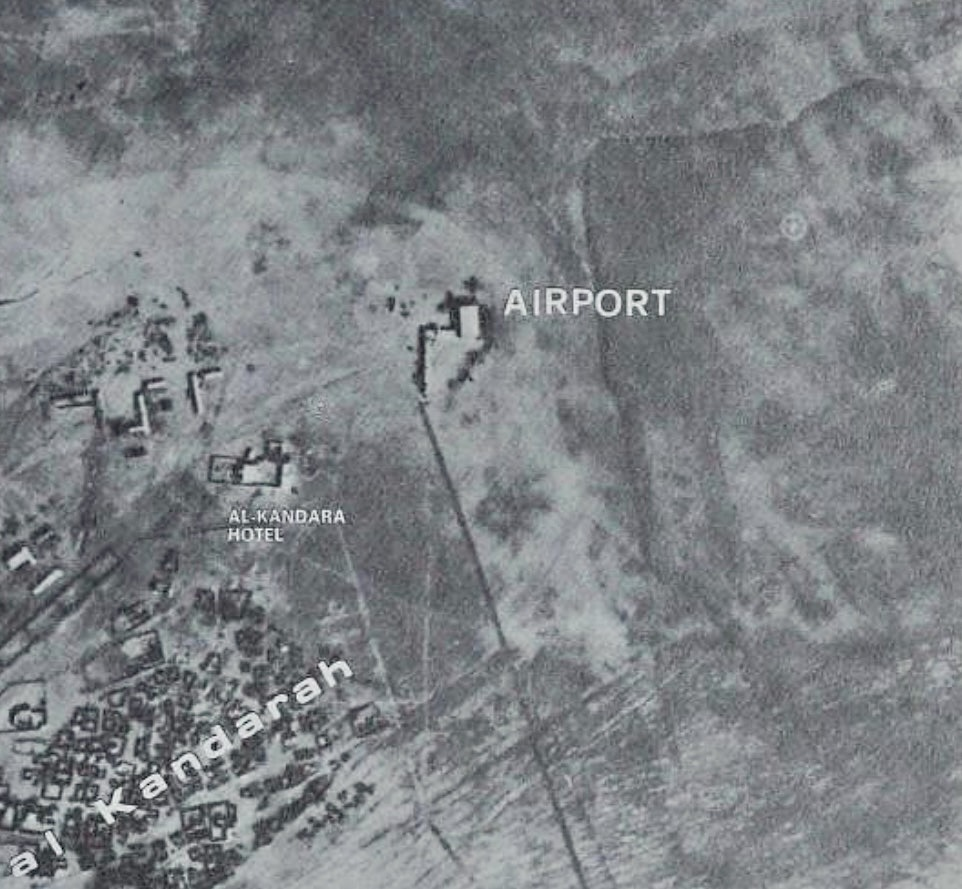
An aerial photograph of Jeddah Airport taken in 1948, showing the landing circle and hangar, along with four aircraft that can be discerned.

During early 1937, the Italian government sent construction engineers to facilitate upgrades that took place at Kandara Aerodrome. In February 1937, an Italian metal hangar measuring 170 x 108 x 23 ft was purchased, and was brought ashore from the steamship Alberto Treves. When it was outside Jeddah harbour, some parts of the hangar was lost when a dhow sank. Nonetheless, the hangar was erected in Kandara Aerodrome on 23 February 1937, which was in time for the arrival of two Caproni Ca.101bis, carrying Italian civil registrations in an attempt to make it easier to obtain overflight permits. The hangar had a planned capacity of up to 25 aircraft, and was paid by the Saudi government at a cost of £2,000. By 1938, efforts were made to improve drainage of the airfield, and construct a proper runway despite the difficulty of acquiring materials from either Italy, Eritrea, or Italian Somaliland. By 1939, Kandara Aerodrome was formally functioning as a military airstrip. In early 1939, Italy offered to train Saudi pilots free of charge, however, the government announced its intention to send future flying cadets to Egypt; citing that training would be done in Arabic. This led to the almost immediate closure of the Italian-run aviation school in Kandara Aerodrome.

In 1949, a group of aviation students were sent to study in England after training at Al-Houba on English de Havilland Tiger Moths. A year later in 1950, more students were sent to England, while others sent to the United States. In 1951, the students graduated and returned to the kingdom to form the nucleus of the Royal Saudi Air Force. There were no paved runways, and instead a sand-packed landing ground measuring 1,006 by 1,006 meters was used.

=== RSAF operations ===
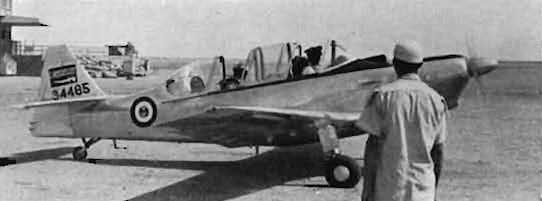
One of ten M.D.A.P. supplied Temco TE-1A Buckaroo trainers which was in service with the RSAF since 1953.

On 5 November 1952, the flag of the Air Force was raised over the first steel hangar in the airport, which was reserved for Air Force usage, leading to the formal establishment of Jeddah Air Base. The ceremony was attended by His Royal Highness Prince Mishaal bin Abdulaziz, Minister of Defense and Aviation. Following the opening, the airport began operating as the headquarters of the Royal Saudi Air Force (RSAF), and Air Force schools began opening throughout the kingdom. On 5 January 1954, the Air Force School was inaugurated at Jeddah Air Base by King Saud. In 1957, the RSAF began major developments in the airbase. The first squadrons were established, including the transportation squadron which was equipped with Douglas C-54 Skymasters and Fokker S-13s. Additionally, the No. 3 Squadron RSAF was established, equipped with Douglas A-26 Invaders, which acted as a major component of modernizing the Air Force. Around the same time, No. 5 Squadron RSAF was formed, equipped with 20 de Havilland Vampires.

In 1960, a $9 million RSAF construction program was launched for the U.S. Military Training Mission. On 1 September 1961, construction of new RSAF support facilities commenced by the Corps of Engineers. A new hangar with supporting workshops, link trainer building, operations buildings and headquarters building was constructed, and were completed on 14 December 1962.

Under the same programme, Riyadh Air Base received a new headquarters building, and the RSAF's HQ was relocated from Jeddah Air Base. During the 1970s, squadrons No. 4 Squadron RSAF, No. 16 Squadron RSAF, and No. 20 under the 8 Wing were either established and reorganized and based at Jeddah Airport. The 8th Wing of the RSAF was stationed in Jeddah Air Base, and operated their Lockheed C-130 Hercules aircraft. The Pakistan Air Force’s Dassault Mirage III aircraft transited through the airfield on delivery flights, and Republic of Singapore Air Force Lockheed T-33 aircraft also passed through for delivery flights. Due to the presence of Air France’s international facility, the base often saw frequent French Air Force Transall C-160 flights from Djibouti.

In January 1983, the Royal Saudi Air Force vacated Jeddah Air Base's facilities and its last aircraft departed from the runways, almost two years after the airport the closed.

== Units ==
The following units based at Jeddah Air Base:

Royal Saudi Air Force

- No. 1 Squadron RSAF, 1954, equipped with Douglas C-54 Skymasters and Fokker S-13s
- No. 2 Squadron RSAF, 1954
- No. 3 Squadron RSAF, 1955 - 1964, equipped with B-26 bombers and 8 Douglas A-26B Invaders
- No. 4 Squadron RSAF, 1957
- No. 5 Squadron RSAF, 1957, equipped with 20 de Havilland Vampires
- No. 4 Squadron RSAF, 8th Wing, 1970s, equipped with the C-130H and C-130E
- No. 16 Squadron RSAF, 8th Wing, 1970s, equipped with the KC-130H
- No. 20 Squadron RSAF, 8th Wing, 1970s, equipped with C-130s
