= No. 1 Squadron RSAF =

No. 1 Squadron RSAF Saudi Arabian Special Flight Royal Flight
- Active: 1954-present
- Country: Saudi Arabia
- Branch: Royal Saudi Air Force
- Type: Squadron
- Part of: RSAF 1 Wing
- Base: King Salman Air Base
- Aircraft: Various

No. 1 Squadron RSAF is a squadron of the Royal Saudi Air Force that operates from King Salman Air Base at King Salman International Airport, Riyadh, Riyadh Province in Saudi Arabia within RSAF 1 Wing.

== History ==
The No. 1 Squadron RSAF was established in 1954 at Jeddah Air Base as a transportation squadron. It was equipped with Douglas C-54 Skymasters and Fokker S-13s.

In 1983, the No. 1 Squadron RSAF operated a VIP transport fleet, which consisted of two Lockheed VC-130H Hercules. At the time, the squadron was also equipped with one Boeing 707-320, one Boeing 747SP, two Lockheed JetStars, two Agusta-Sikorsky AS-61A-4 helicopters and one Agusta-Bell AB.206 helicopter.

=== Aircraft ===
As of 2023, the squadron is equipped with the following aircraft:

- Airbus A340-213X
- Airbus A340-541
- Agusta-Sikorksy 61A-4 Sea King
- Boeing 737-7DP
- Boeing 737-8DP
- Boeing 737-9FGER
- Boeing 747-3G1
- Boeing 747-468
- BAe 125-800A
- BAe 125-800B
- Cessna 550 Bravo
- CASA/IPTN CN-235-10
- Gulfstream G-IV
- Lockheed L-100-30
- Lockheed VC-130H Hercules

It used to fly the Boeing 707-320, Lockheed C-140B JetStar, Agusta-Bell 206A and the AS-61A-4.
