= No. 10 Squadron RSAF =

- Official Squadron Badge of No. 10 Squadron RSAF
- Active: 1970s-present
- Country: Saudi Arabia
- Branch: Royal Saudi Air Force
- Type: Squadron
- Role: Close Air Support and Reconnaissance
- Part of: RSAF 2 Wing
- Base: King Fahad Air Base, Taif
- Aircraft: Eurofighter Typhoon F.2 & T.3

No. 10 Squadron RSAF is a squadron of the Royal Saudi Air Force that operates the Eurofighter Typhoon F.2 & T.3 from King Fahad Air Base, Taif, Mecca Province in Saudi Arabia within RSAF 2 Wing.

The squadron attended Exercise Spears of Victory 23 during February 2023 at King Abdulaziz Air Base.

During the 1980s the squadron used to fly the Northrop F-5E Tiger II at King Khalid Air Base, Khamis Mushayt.
