= King Fahd Air Base =

Military airport in Saudi Arabia

King Fahd Air Base
- Taif, Mecca Province in Saudi Arabia

Site information
- Type: Airbase
- Owner: Ministry of Defense
- Operator: Royal Saudi Air Force

Location
- Shown within Saudi Arabia
- Coordinates: 21°28′59″N 040°32′39″E

Site history
- In use: Unknown - present

Airfield information
- Identifiers: ICAO: OETF
- Elevation: 1,477 metres (4,846 ft) AMSL
Runways
| Direction | Length and surface |
|---|---|
| 07/25 | 3,735 metres (12,254 ft) Asphalt |
| 17/35 | 3,350 metres (10,991 ft) Asphalt |

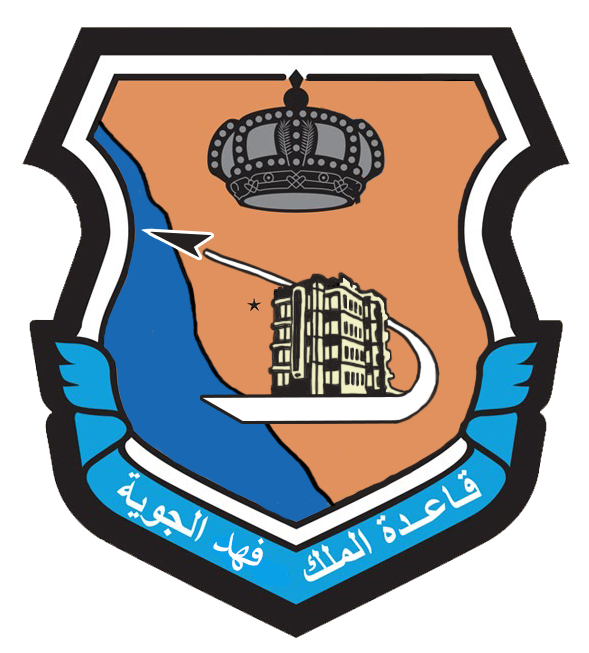
King Fahid Air Base emblem

King Fahd Air Base (Arabic: قاعدة الملك فهد الجوية) (ICAO: OETF) (KFAB) is a Royal Saudi Air Force military base located in Taif, Mecca Province, Saudi Arabia.

== Units ==
- RSAF 2 Wing:
  - No. 3 Squadron RSAF with the Eurofighter Typhoon F2 and the Typhoon T3
  - No. 10 Squadron RSAF with the Typhoon F2 and the Typhoon T3
  - No. 80 Squadron RSAF with the Typhoon F2
- RSAF 9 Wing:
  - No. 14 Squadron RSAF with the AB412EP and the Bell 412EP
  - No. 33 Squadron RSAF with the AB412EP and the Bell 412EP
  - No. 44 Squadron RSAF with the AB412EP and the Bell 412EP
- RSAF 10 Wing:
  - No. 5 Squadron RSAF with the McDonnell Douglas F-15C Eagle and the F-15D
  - No. 34 Squadron RSAF with the F-15C and the F-15D
  - No. 94 Squadron RSAF with the F-15SA

== See also ==
- List of airports in Saudi Arabia
- List of military installations in Saudi Arabia
