= No. 3 Squadron RSAF =

- Official Squadron Badge of No. 3 Squadron RSAF
- Active: 1957-present
- Country: Saudi Arabia
- Branch: Royal Saudi Air Force
- Type: Squadron
- Role: Close Air Support and Pilots/Technicians Training
- Part of: RSAF 2 Wing
- Base: King Fahad Air Base, Taif
- Aircraft: Eurofighter Typhoon F.2 & T.3

No. 3 Squadron RSAF is a squadron of the Royal Saudi Air Force that operates the Eurofighter Typhoon F.2 & T.3 at King Fahad Air Base, Taif, Mecca Province in Saudi Arabia within RSAF 2 Wing.

In the 1950s, the Royal Saudi Air Force begun major improvements, which included the formation of new squadrons. In 1957, the No. 3 Squadron RSAF was established at Jeddah Air Base equipped with Douglas B-26 Invaders.

During the 1980s the squadron used to fly the Northrop F-5E Tiger II at Taif.
