= No. 80 Squadron RSAF =

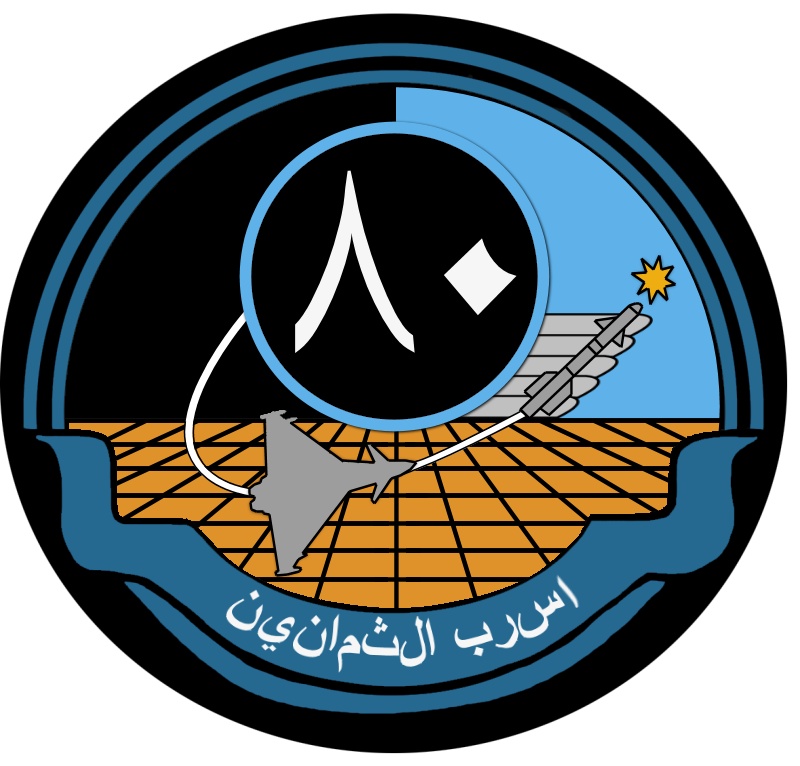
- Squadron Badge of No. 80 Squadron RSAF
- Active: Unknown-present
- Country: Saudi Arabia
- Branch: Royal Saudi Air Force
- Type: Squadron
- Role: Close Air Support and Reconnaissance
- Part of: RSAF 2 Wing
- Base: King Fahad Air Base, Taif
- Aircraft: Eurofighter Typhoon F.2

No. 80 Squadron RSAF is a squadron of the Royal Saudi Air Force that operates the Eurofighter Typhoon F.2 at King Fahad Air Base, Taif, Mecca Province in Saudi Arabia within RSAF 2 Wing.
