= No. 34 Squadron RSAF =

- Active: Unknown-present
- Country: Saudi Arabia
- Branch: Royal Saudi Air Force
- Type: Squadron
- Part of: RSAF 2 Wing
- Base: King Fahad Air Base, Taif
- Aircraft: McDonnell Douglas F-15C Eagle; McDonnell Douglas F-15D Eagle

No. 34 Squadron RSAF is a squadron of the Royal Saudi Air Force that operates the McDonnell Douglas F-15C Eagle and the F-15D at King Fahad Air Base, Taif, Mecca Province in Saudi Arabia within RSAF 2 Wing.
