= Aviodrome =

Aerospace museum at Lelystad Airport in the Netherlands

Coordinates: 52°27′26″N 5°31′46″E

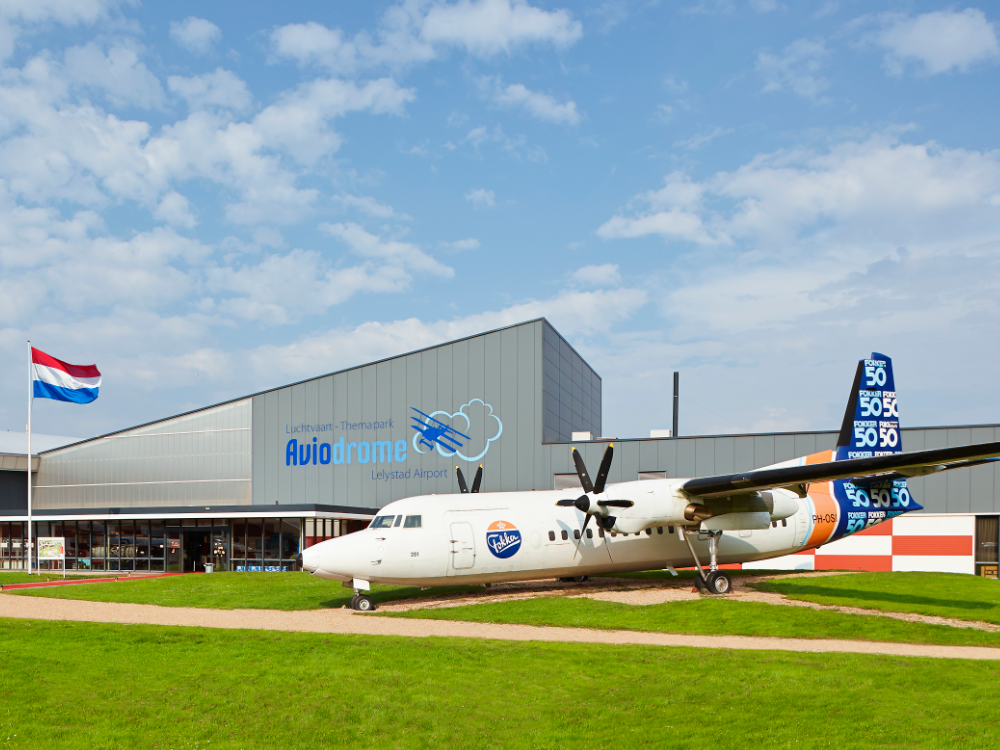
The entrance to the museum is flanked by the second prototype of the Fokker 50.

The Nationaal Luchtvaart-Themapark Aviodrome (also known simply as Aviodrome) is a large aerospace museum in the Netherlands that has been located on Lelystad Airport since 2003. Previously the museum was located at Schiphol Airport.

== History ==
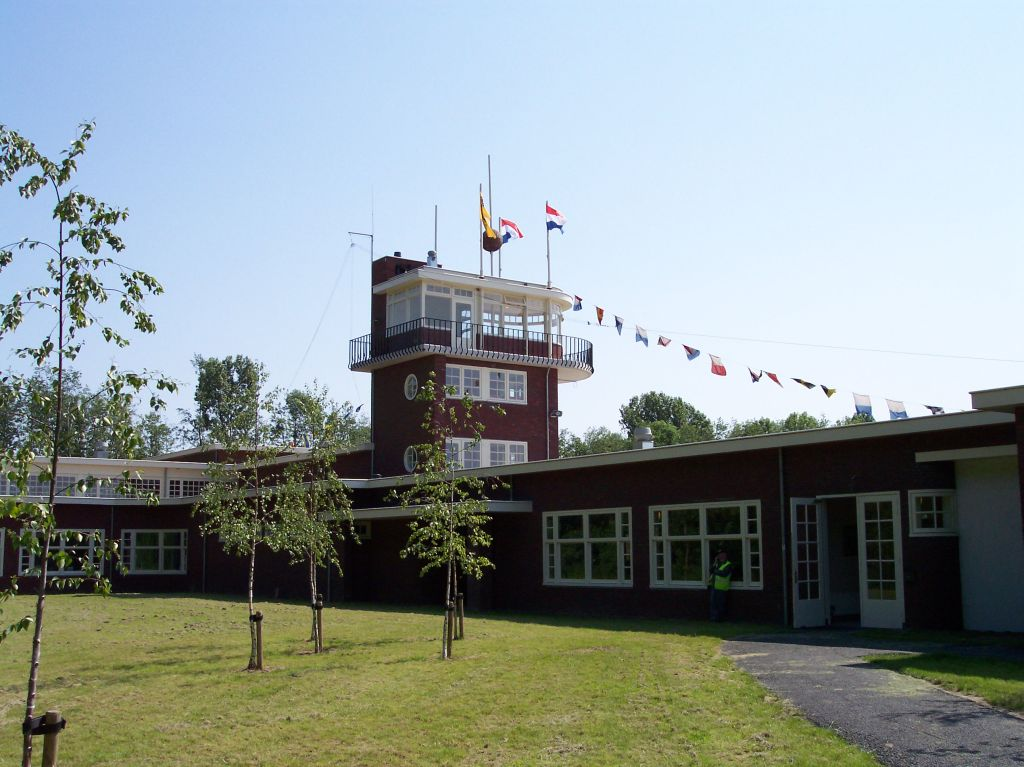
Replica of the old Schiphol terminal building from 1928

In 1955 several organisations, such as the airline KLM and aircraft manufacturer Fokker, initiated a foundation called "Stichting voor het Nationaal Luchtvaartmuseum" with the single goal of creating a national aviation museum.

The first installment of this aviation museum opened its doors in 1960 at Schiphol airport under the name Aeroplanorama and had only seven aircraft on display. It closed its doors in 1967 and a new museum called Aviodome was opened in 1971 at Schiphol. The main building was a large aluminium geodesic dome designed by Buckminster Fuller, the largest in the world at the time, which housed most of the aircraft on display. Hence the 'dome' in the name Aviodome.

Over time, the location became too small for the growing aircraft collection and in 2003 the museum was moved to a new location on Lelystad Airport. The building at Schiphol was demolished and the name was changed to Aviodrome. On the current location, it has five buildings: the main building where most of the aircraft on display are located and where there's a restaurant and a cinema, a replica of the old Schiphol terminal building from 1928 and a hangar for aircraft storage with limited access for visitors, an officer's mess that functions as a restaurant during school vacations, which is also attached to the fifth building which is a hangar housing an exposition on the history of the Jet engine and fighter. Added to the aviation theme were several artifacts from several Dutch space programs, such as the backup flight-article of ANS (Astronomical Netherlands Satellite), a mockup of IRAS and the high-speed windtunnel model of the Huygens probe. In doing so the aviation museum became an aerospace museum.

Due to bankruptcy, the museum closed on 25 December 2011, but it reopened on 28 April 2012 after a takeover by the Libéma Group.

== Collection ==
=== Aircraft collection ===
Note that not all aircraft listed are currently on display or even present at the museum. The museum also frequently houses or is visited by aircraft that are not owned by the museum.

- Aérospatiale Dauphin 2
- Agusta - Bell 204B UH-1
- Alsema Sagitta
- ANR-1 airship gondola
- Antonov An-2
- Auster J.1 Autocrat
- BAC Jet Provost (cockpit only)
- B.A.T. F.K.23 Bantam
- 4x balloon basket

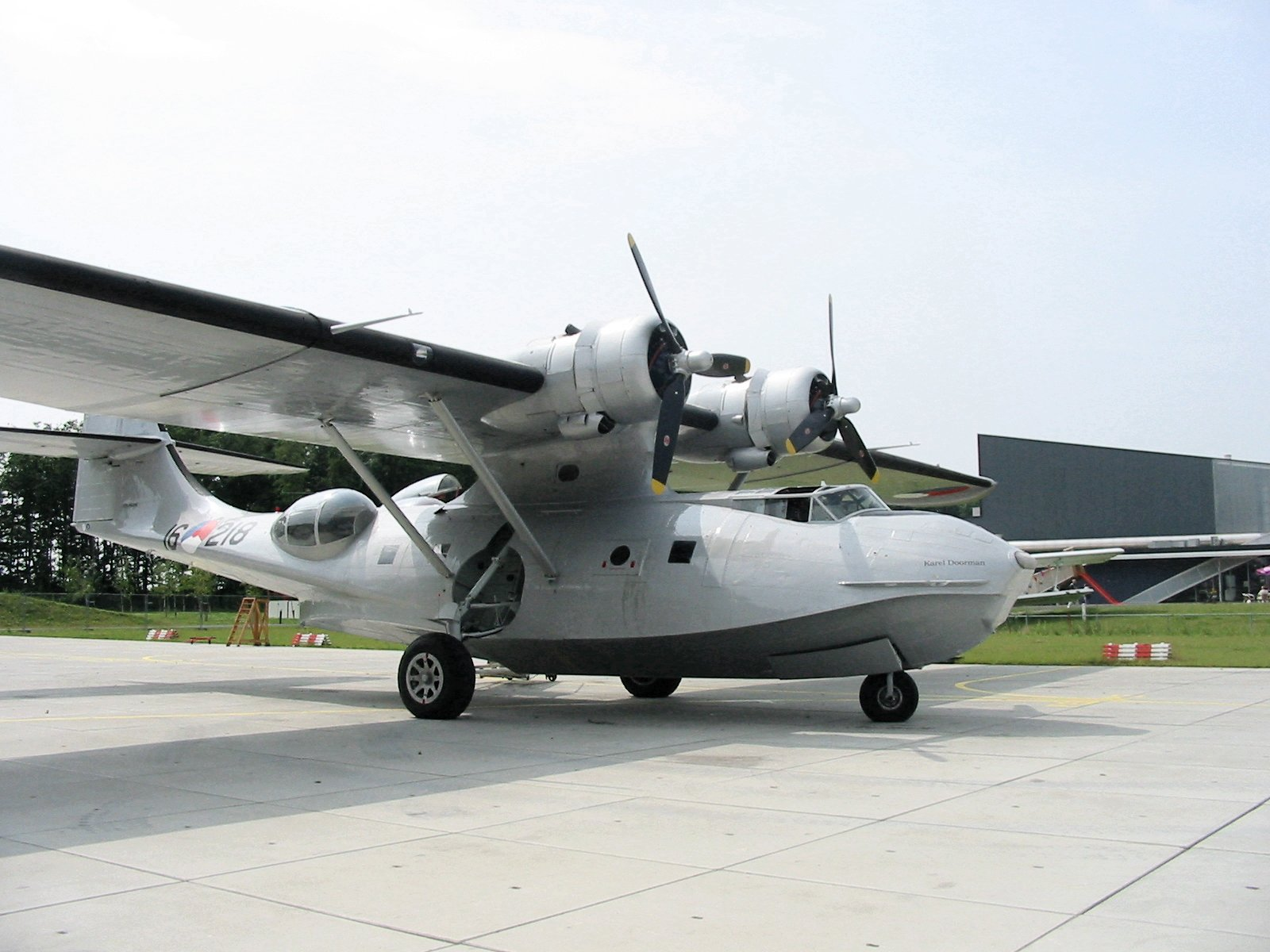
The Catalina at the museum

- Ballooncapsule Dutch Viking
- Beechcraft D-18, used in the James Bond movie Octopussy
- Birdman Cherokee
- Blackburn Buccaneer (cockpit only)
- Blériot XI
- Boeing 747-200 Louis Blériot
- Bölkow Bo 105
- Cierva C.30A Autogiro
- Consolidated PBY5A Catalina
- Cessna 172 (still active for aerial photography)
- De Havilland Canada Beaver (cockpit only)
- De Havilland DH.82A Tiger Moth
- 2x De Havilland DH.104 Dove (one complete and one cockpit)
- DFS Olympia
- 2x Douglas C-47 Skytrain
- 2x Douglas DC-2 (one flying, the other in bad state and incomplete)
- Douglas DC-3
- Douglas DC-4 Skymaster
- Evans VP-1 Volksplane
- V-1 "Flying bomb" (model)
- Firebird ultralight
- 2x Fokker Spin
- Fokker Dr.I
- Fokker F.2
- Fokker B-4A (incomplete)
- Fokker C-5D
- Fokker F-7a
- Fokker F-8 "Duif"
- Fokker S-4 (incomplete)
- 4 x Fokker S-11 instructors (used in airshows)
- Fokker S-12
- Fokker S-13 (tailpiece only)
- Fokker S-14 machtrainer
- 2x Fokker F-27 Friendship (one still airworthy)
- Fokker F-27-050 (F-50 prototype based on F-27)
- Fokker 100
- Mock-up cockpit Fokker 100
- Fouga Magister (flying)
- 2x Grumman S2N Tracker
- Grunau Baby

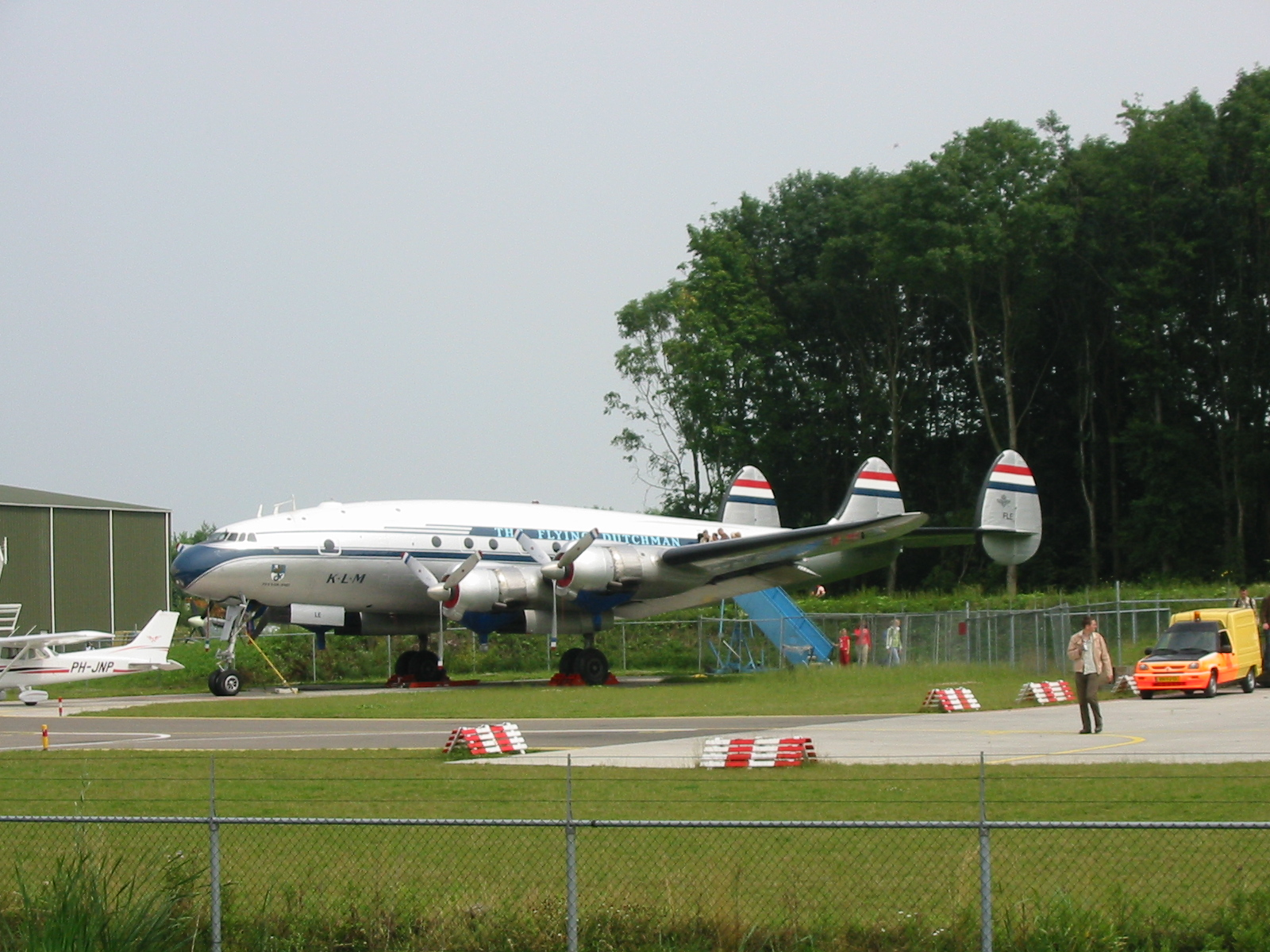
The Lockheed Constellation at the museum

- Hawker Sea Fury
- Hawker Hunter Mk.4
- Hawker Sea Hawk
- Junkers Ju 52 (license built by CASA)
- Lilienthal Gleitflugzeug (German for glider) replica
- Lockheed L-749 Constellation
- 2x Lockheed F-104 Starfighter
- Lockheed SP2H Neptune
- MiG-21 PFM Fishbed-F
- 2x Mignet HM-14 Pou du Ciel
- N.H.I. H.2 Kolibri
- N.H.I. H.3 Kolibri
- Noorduyn C-64 Norseman (in restoration)
- Noorduyn Harvard
- North American B.25 Mitchell (incomplete)
- Pander Zögling
- Piper J-3 Cub
- Raytheon Hawk missile
- Rienks R-1B giroglider
- Rogallo sailplane "Engel" prototype
- Rogallo sailplane Penguin
- Rogallo sailplane La Mouette Cobra
- Saab 91D Safir
- Saab Viggen

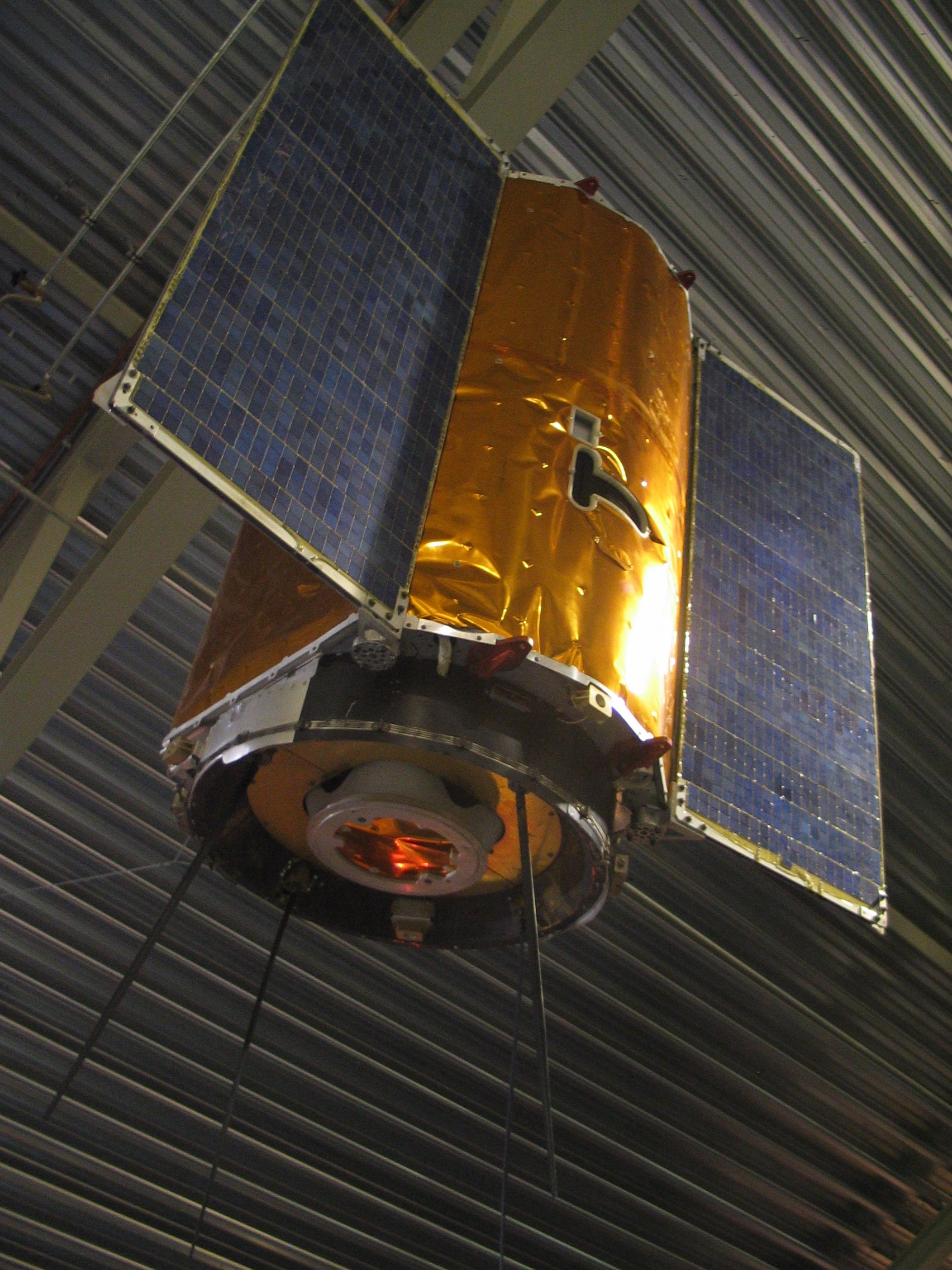
Backup flight-article of the ANS satellite

- 3x Schleicher Ka-4 Rhönlerche (only one in good condition)
- Schleicher Ka-8B
- Sikorski S-55
- 3x Stearman Hammond Y-1S
- Sud Aviation SE.210 Caravelle (cockpit only)
- Supermarine Spitfire (replica)
- Van Ommeren VO-3
- Westland WS-51 Dragonfly
- Wright Flyer replica

=== Space collection ===
- Astronomical Netherlands Satellite (backup flight-article)
- Infrared Astronomy Satellite - IRAS (mockup partially built from structural spares)
- Huygens probe (windtunnel model)

== Noteworthy projects ==
=== Jumbo's touchdown ===
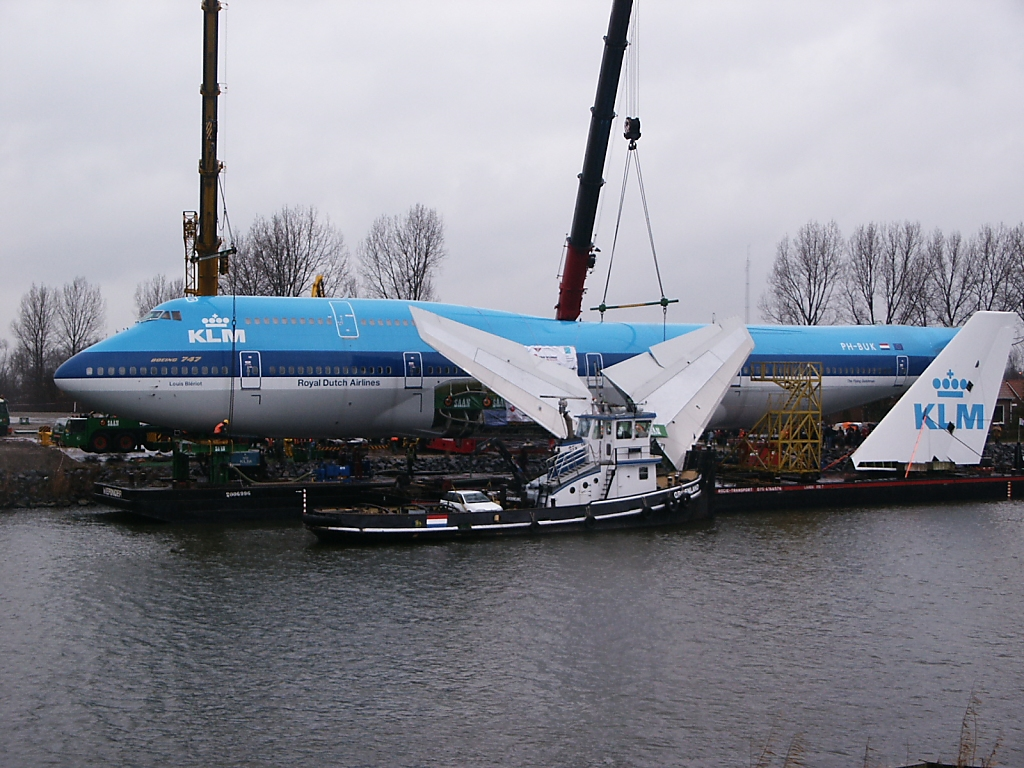
The Louis Blériot being lifted from a barge

In 2004 the last of KLM's classic Boeing 747-200's named Louis Blériot was sold to the Aviodrome for the symbolic amount of 1 euro. Though the aircraft could still fly, Lelystad Airport was too small to handle such a large aircraft so the aircraft was partially disassembled and moved over water on a barge with the wings, engines and empennage removed and stored alongside the fuselage so the aircraft could fit under bridges along the way. After the journey over water that attracted a lot of attention the aircraft was lifted from the barge at Harderwijk and the last bit of the trip took place over land. At its final location the aircraft was re-assembled and opened to the public. The tail was fitted with a top beacon since, technically, the Boeing now is a building.

=== Connie's comeback ===
Perhaps one of the most spectacular pieces in the collection of the Aviodrome is the Lockheed L-749 Constellation, often just called Connie. After several years of restoration work it was flown over to the Netherlands in 2002 from the United States where it had been in storage. More work, including a new paint job, was done to the aircraft in the Netherlands but the aircraft suffered from engine problems in 2004. To resolve this, two replacement engines coming from the Korean Air museum were fitted. However, it hasn't flown since 2004, performances by the aircraft being limited to engine runs only.

=== De Uiver ===
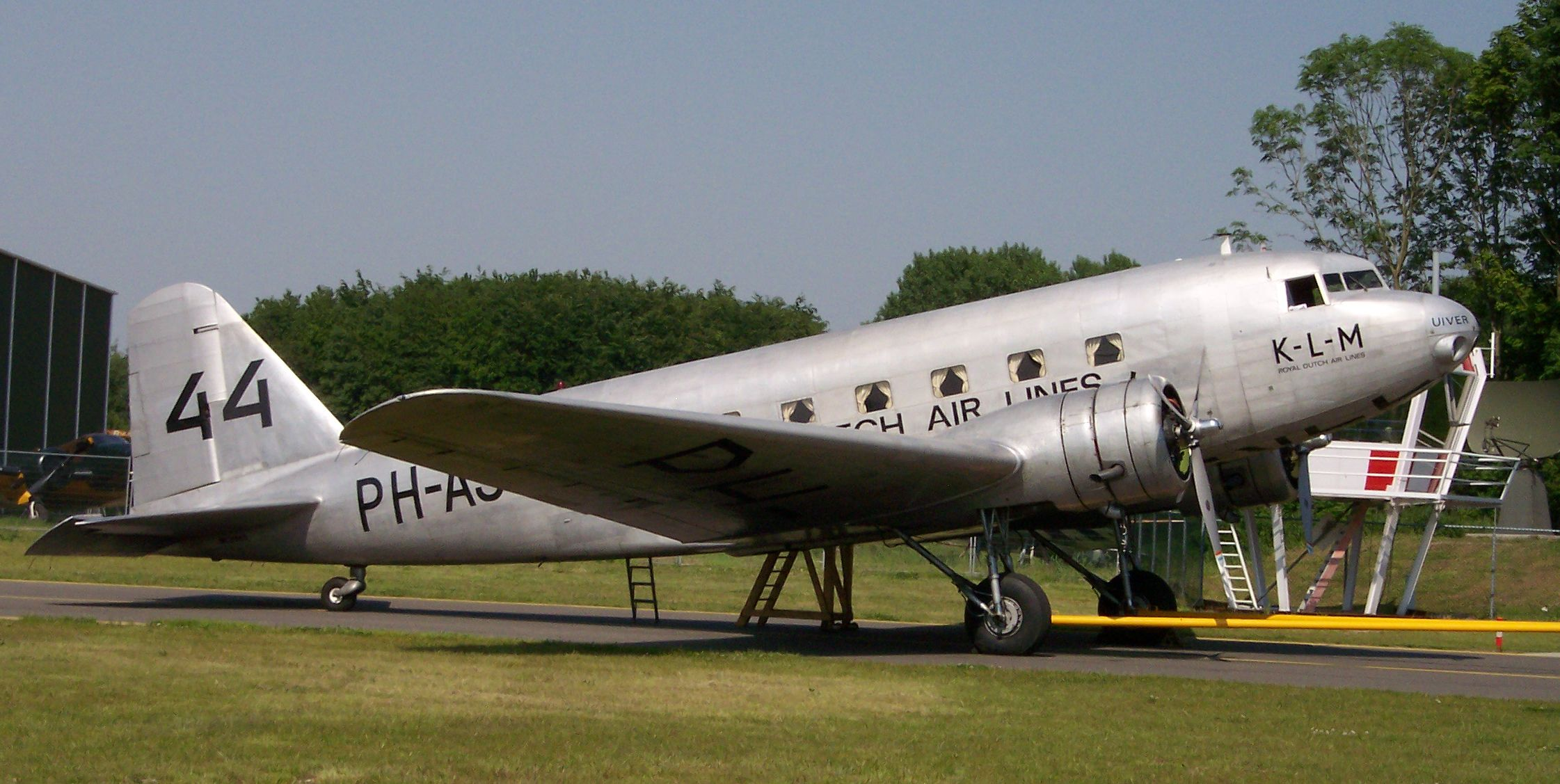
DC-2 – De Uiver

De Uiver was the name of a Douglas DC-2 that placed second in the 1934 MacRobertson Air Race, only being beaten by a purpose built de Havilland DH.88 racer Grosvenor House. The real Uiver, which is an old Dutch word for stork, no longer exists. The Aviodrome owns one of the last still airworthy DC-2s in the world. This DC-2 is a former US Navy aircraft painted in the Uiver's original KLM colors. After an unexpected gear collapse the aircraft suffered some minor damage, but after the needed funds were raised the aircraft was repaired.

=== Fokker Friendship ===
The Fokker F-27 Friendship was Fokker's best-selling aircraft model of all time. Production of this first post-war Fokker airliner started in 1955 and many of them are still in service today. The Aviodrome purchased the oldest still flying series produced F-27 from its Australian owner in 2004, and painted it in the colors of the no longer existing Nederlandse Luchtvaart Maatschappij (NLM). Exactly fifty years after the first flight of the first F-27 on 24 November 1955 this aircraft made a memorial flight as a tribute to fifty years of the Fokker Friendship.
