= No. 14 Squadron RSAF =

- Active: 1970s-present
- Country: Saudi Arabia
- Branch: Royal Saudi Air Force
- Type: Squadron
- Part of: RSAF 2 Wing
- Base: King Fahad Air Base, Taif
- Aircraft: Agusta-Bell AB 412EP; Bell 412EP

No. 14 Squadron RSAF is a squadron of the Royal Saudi Air Force that operates the Agusta-Bell AB 412EP and the Bell 412EP at King Fahad Air Base, Taif, Mecca Province in Saudi Arabia within RSAF 2 Wing. The squadron also operates a detachment at King Khalid Air Base, Khamis Mushait, 'Asir Province in Saudi Arabia within RSAF 5 Wing.

It used to fly the Agusta-Bell AB 206, Aérospatiale Alouette III, Boeing Vertol KV-107 and the Agusta-Bell AB 212 at Taif.
