= Fokker S.14 Machtrainer =

1955 military training aircraft

S.14 Machtrainer
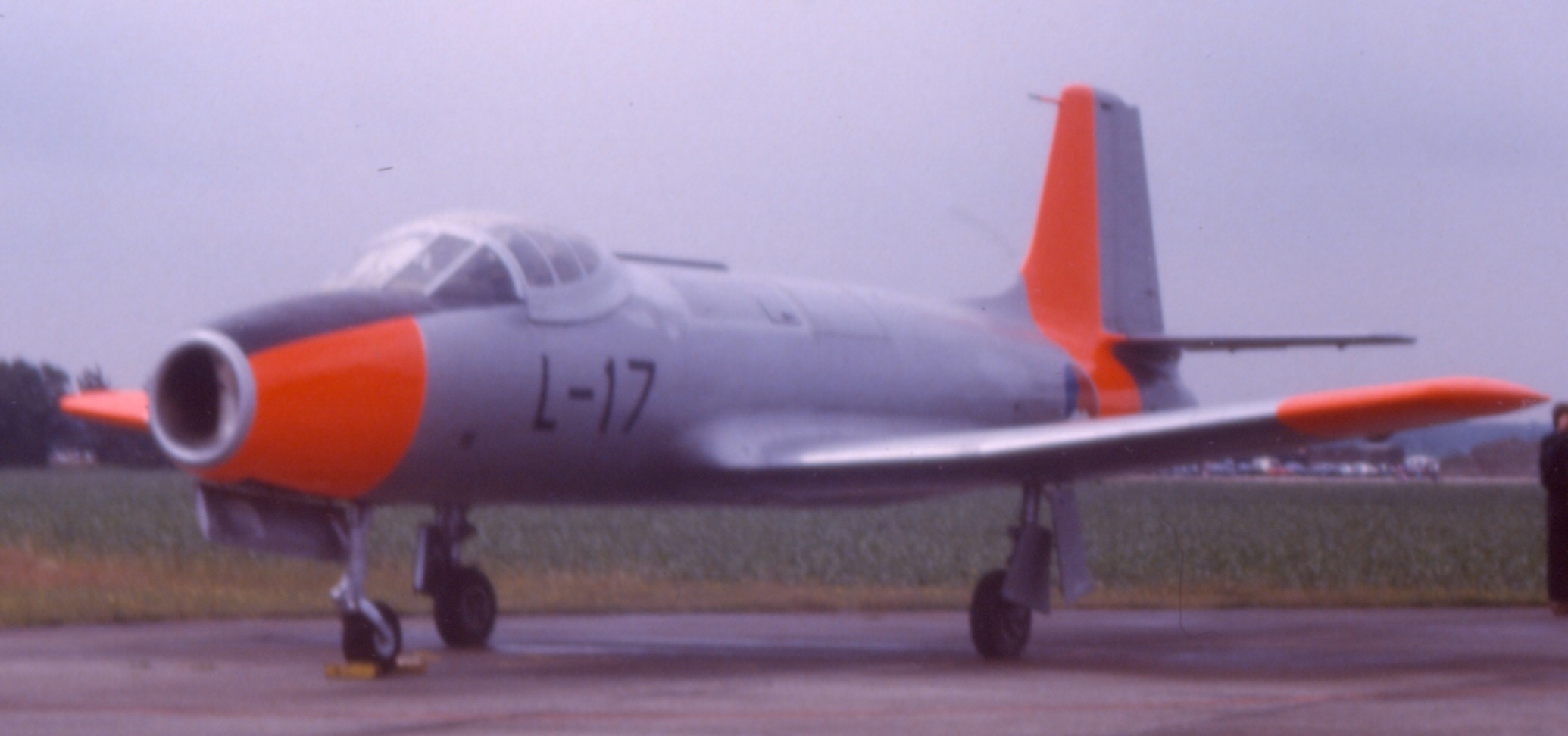
- Machtrainer L-17

General information
- Type: Jet trainer
- National origin: Netherlands
- Manufacturer: Fokker
- Primary user: Royal Netherlands Air Force
- Number built: 21

History
- Introduction date: 1955
- First flight: 19 May 1951
- Retired: 1967

The Fokker S.14 Machtrainer is a two-seater military training jet aircraft designed and manufactured by the Dutch aircraft manufacturer Fokker for the Royal Netherlands Air Force (RNLAF). It has the distinction of being one of the first dedicated jet-powered training aircraft to be produced in the world.

Development started in the late 1940s at the behest of British engine manufacturer Rolls-Royce, who were seeking out a manufacturer to produce a new trainer aircraft powered by their Derwent turbojet engine. Fokker decided to design such an aircraft, designating it the S.14 Machtrainer. On 19 May 1951, the first prototype performed the type's maiden flight. Having secured an order from the RNLAF for 20 aircraft, the Machtrainer entered service with the service during 1955. It would be operated by the service until the last examples were retired in 1967.

Fokker initially had high sales hopes for the Machtrainer on the global trainer market, which included its manufacture under license overseas. American aircraft manufacturer Fairchild was interested in producing the Machtrainer for the United States Air Force, but failed to secure any orders itself. Brazil also negotiated for the local manufacture of 50 Rolls-Royce Nene-powered Machtrainers, but political changes derailed this effort as well. Various countries studied its adoption, however, the Machtrainer would ultimately not be adopted by any organisation other than the RNLAF.

== Development ==
=== Origins ===
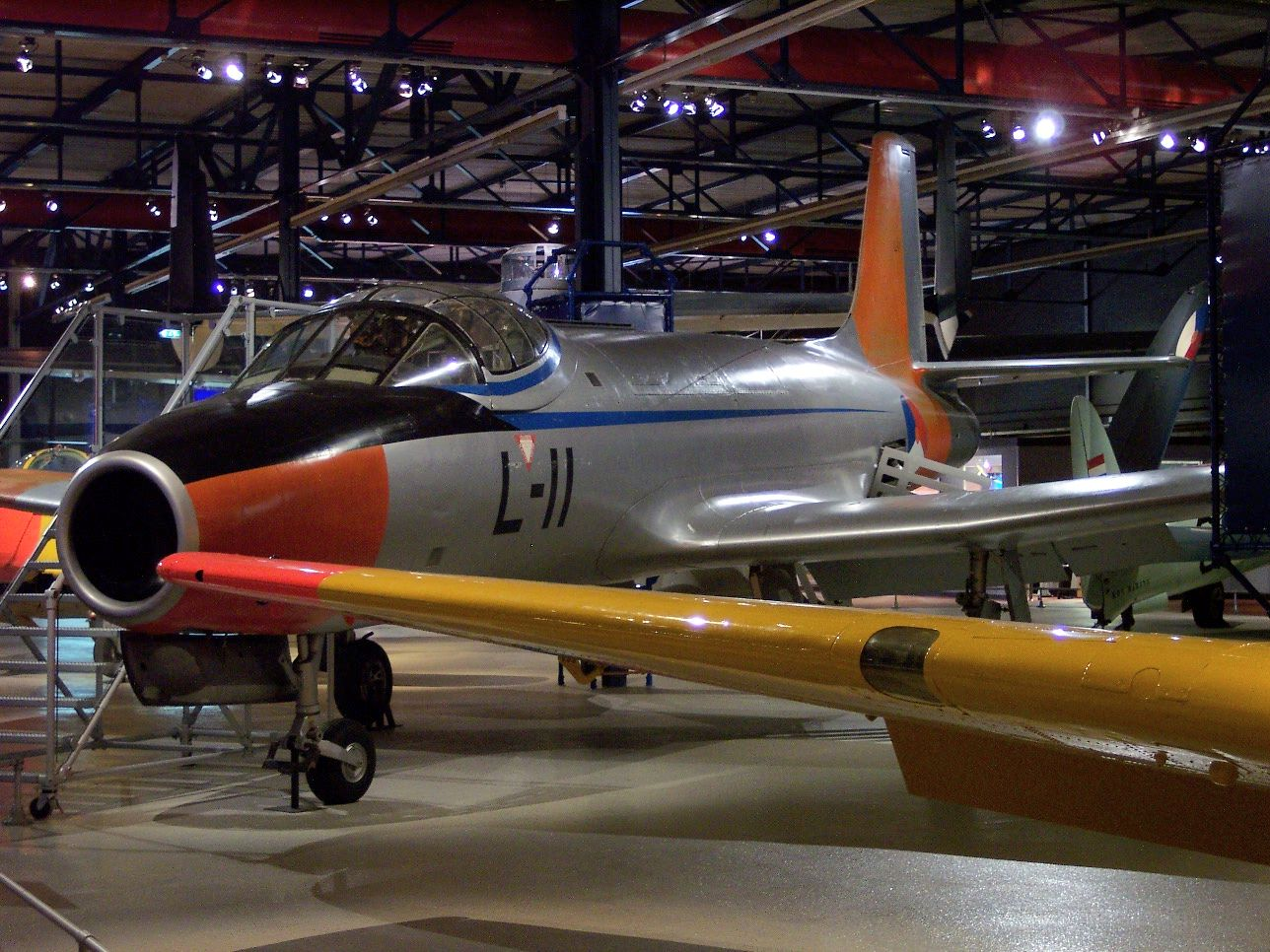
Machtrainer L-11 on static display in a museum, June 2007

Following the end of the Second World War, the nations of Europe began to recover and rebuild their national industries, Dutch aircraft manufacturer Fokker was no exception. While initial activities revolved around the refurbishment and building of foreign-designed aircraft, such as the Hawker Sea Fury and Gloster Meteor, figures within the Dutch government and Fokker itself were keen to resume its own indigenous design activities as well. In particular, there was considerable interest in Fokker developing aircraft that would harness the newly available field of jet propulsion.

Likely having recognised that the increasing prevalence of jet-powered fighters would soon lead to existing piston-engined advanced trainers not possessing comparable performance, during the late 1940s, Fokker commenced work on designing their own jet-engined advanced trainer, designated S.14 Machtrainer. In 1949, aviation periodical Flight International observed the company's specification to have been "unique... a turbojet-powered advanced trainer, offering side-by-side seating of pupil and instructor, simplicity in maintenance and construction and an adequate all-round performance".

According to aviation author Roland W. Harker, the notion of producing a Dutch jet trainer had originated from a speculative approach by British engine manufacturer Rolls-Royce to Fokker with drawings for a Derwent-powered jet trainer. Allegedly, Rolls-Royce had feared losing out on engine sales upon the large and lucrative market for jet trainers, particularly to the Goblin-powered de Havilland Vampire; the company had previously been rebuffed after attempting to raise interest with British manufacturer Miles Aircraft in producing a Derwent-powered competitor, and thus decided to approach Fokker.

=== Into flight ===
On 19 May 1951, the first prototype, registered PH-NDY, conducted its maiden flight; it was powered by a single Derwent V engine. However, it received considerable damage later that day as a result of the undercarriage having failed to extend during its second flight. The prototype was fully repaired and was subsequently displayed at the Paris Air Show later that year. While the prototype and the production aircraft that followed it were largely similar, portions of the airframe were strengthened to cope with greater G-forces.

The Royal Netherlands Air Force placed an order for 20 S.14s equipped with the more powerful Rolls-Royce Derwent 8 engine. (Note: The Derwent 8, like the Derwent V, was based on a scaled-down Rolls-Royce Nene and not on earlier Derwents. It was a centrifugal flow design with nine combustion chambers and a single-stage turbine, with air flow rate of 62.84 lb/s (28.50 kg/s) delivering a peak thrust of 16.0 kN; 3,600 lbf (1,630 kp) at 14,700 rpm.) At one point, Fokker held great hopes for the Machtrainer's export prospects; the company held negotiations with Brazil on the topic of manufacturing 50 Rolls-Royce Nene-powered Machtrainers under licence. In addition, the American aircraft manufacturer Fairchild, which later also built the Fokker Friendship under license, sought to secure an order for the Machtrainer from the United States Air Force. The first demonstrator sent to the USA was lost on October 20, 1955, when during a demonstration flight in Maryland, USA; the aircraft went into spin and crashed, killing the test pilot. Another S.14 was sent to the US and did demonstration flights in 1955 and 1956. The loss claimed the life of the test pilot nl:Gerben Sonderman, who had also flown the first flights of S-14 in 1951. Sonderman was a famous Dutch pilot and resistance fighter from WW2, and also tested other Fokker produces such as the Fokker S-11.

The S-14 was evaluated by many pilots, including Chuck Yeager and WW2 aces, and there was considerable interest; it was widely praised as being easy and forgiving to fly.

To support the company's sales efforts, the first prototype was reengined with the Nene III powerplant, which was capable of producing up to 5,100 lbf (23 kN) thrust; it first flew in this configuration on 25 October 1953. Flight testing found that the increased power of the Nene III enabled the Machtrainer to attain a higher maximum speed of 516 mph (830 km/h). However, the Brazilian initiative ultimately came to naught, interest having evaporated following a change of government in Brazil. Fairchild also chose to abandon its production plans for the type. Although several other countries also tested the aircraft, orders did not materialize. Compared to other dedicated jet trainer designs of the same period such as the Fouga Magister, the Machtrainer possessed higher operational costs.

The original prototype K-1 was further modified with more powerful Nene III engine, and test flown in 1953. In the 1960s it was further tested by the Dutch National Aerospace Laboratory (Nationaal Lucht- en Ruimtevaart Laboratorium) .

== Design ==
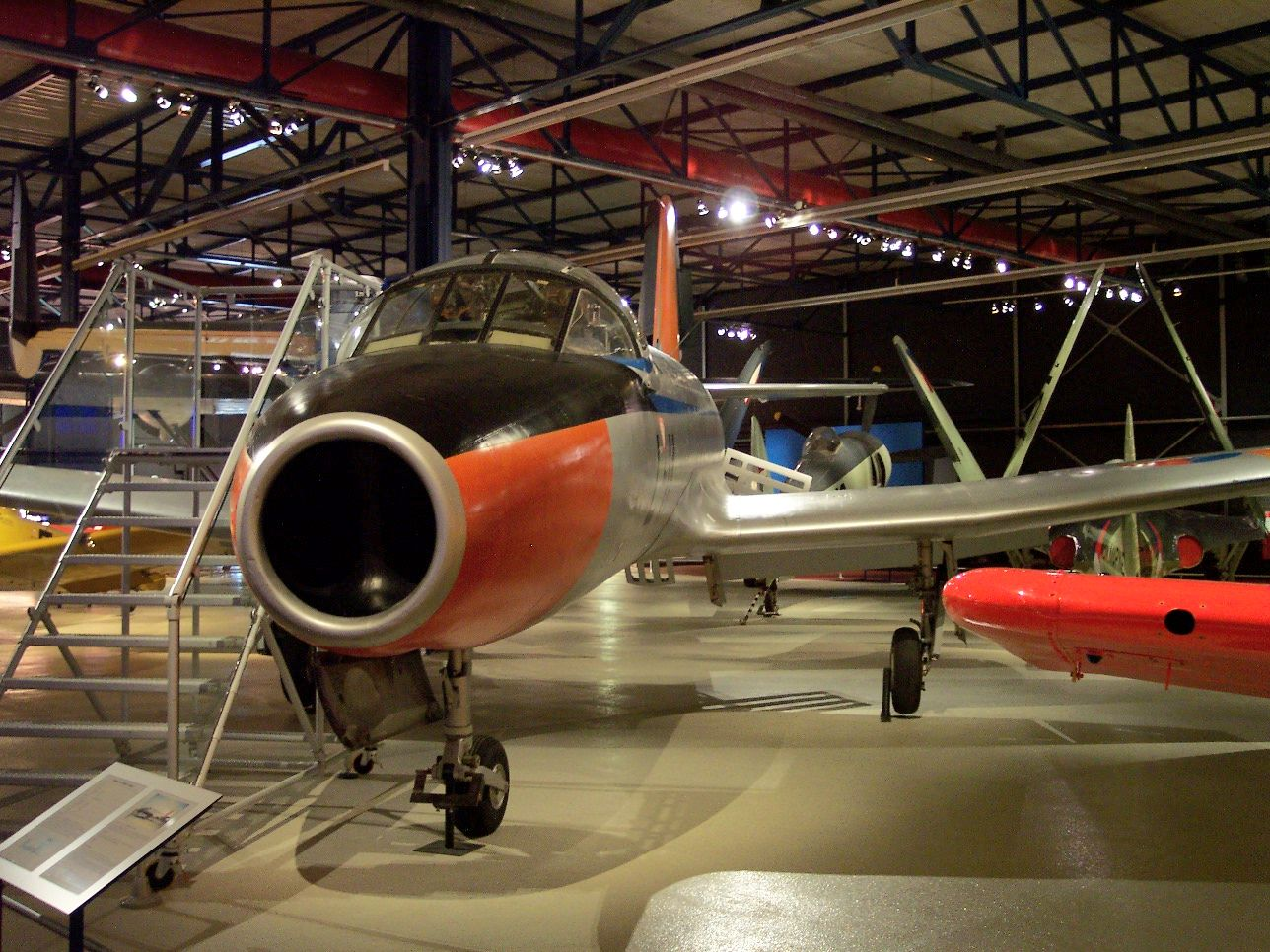
Close-up view of a preserved Machtrainer. Note the nose air inlet for feeding air to the engine

The S.14 Machtrainer was a low-winged monoplane. Featuring all-metal construction, aside from the engine compartment, it was almost exclusively composed of lightweight alloys. To accommodate a sizable cockpit, it possessed a fairly wide fuselage. The design and size of the wing reportedly allowed for the aircraft to land at much lower speeds than contemporary jet aircraft. A total of three pneumatically-actuated door-type air brakes were fitted to the rear fuselage. It was also provisioned with a retractable tricycle undercarriage, which was also pneumatically operated; the main wheels were fitted with Dowty-built shock absorbers. The main assemblies of the undercarriage retracted inwards into the wing's centre section, while the nosewheel retracted forwards into a recess under the nose.

In order to better facilitate its use as a trainer, the crew of two were seated in a side-by-side arrangement within a relatively spacious cockpit. There was actually enough room for a third crew member, although this capability would necessitate the deletion of the radio or radar equipment that could otherwise be installed in this location. Primary controls, such as the throttle and air brakes, were duplicated; many of the controls were positioned on a central pedestal. Both aircrew were provided with Martin-Baker-built Mk.2FK ejection seats. The slide hood of the canopy was jettisonable and operated electrically. The majority of the aircraft's electrical systems were installed directly beneath the cockpit and were accessible via multiple inspection panels; consumables such as batteries and oxygen canisters were also housed nearby.

The S.14 was powered by a single Rolls-Royce Derwent engine, accommodated in the centre of the fuselage, directly above the low-mounted wing and surrounded by steel walls, and separated from the cockpit by a fireproof bulkhead. Air was supplied to the engine via two ducts that diverged sharply from a central circular inlet present in the nose of the aircraft. A lengthy jetpipe, carried upon trunnions, was also used; it could be released and readily moved for maintenance inspections. Fuel tanks were housed within the central and outer sections of the wing; electrical booster pumps transferred fuel between the engine and the inner tanks, while air pressure alone was sufficient to move fuel from the outer tanks. The wing's centre sections were individually bolted onto the lower fuselage; the wing itself was tapered, covered in alclad, and featured split-flaps along the centre of its trailing edge.

The trainer was unarmed, but a gunpod with two 20 mm canons was designed, the gunpod which fitted under the airplane which was test flown as a mockup. In addition, it was also possible to put some hardpoints on the wings for attaching for example a bomb, but this was never done. The gunpod was featured as an option in the advertising literature

== Operational history ==
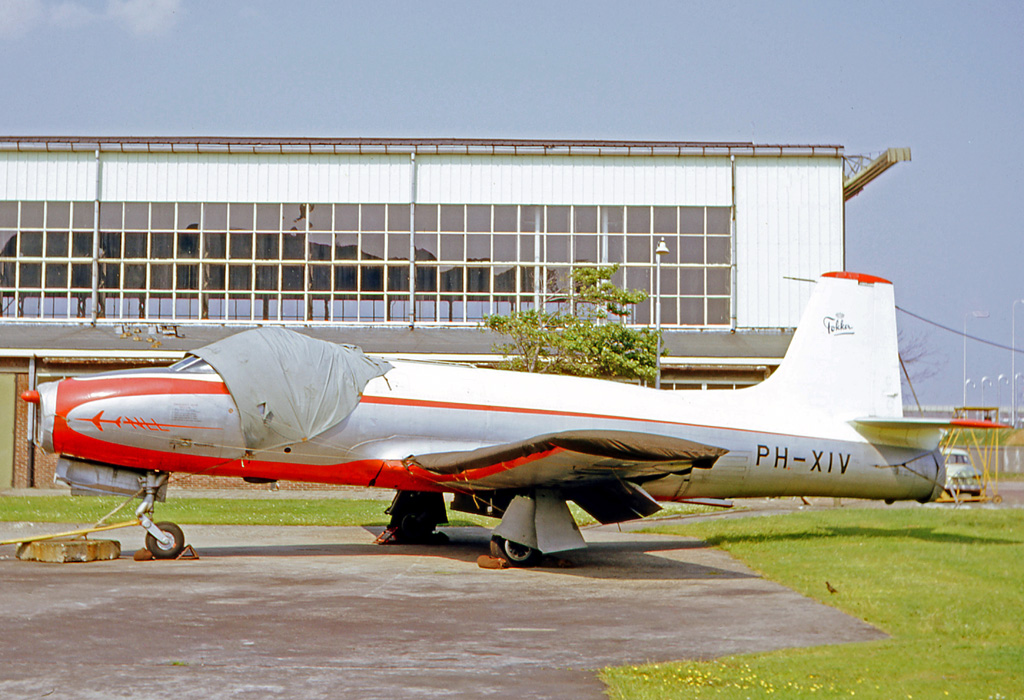
The prototype Fokker S.14 wearing the markings of the Nationaal Luchtvaartlaboratorium (NLL) at Schiphol Airport, Amsterdam, in 1967, soon after its retirement

During October 1955, the Machtrainer entered service with the Royal Netherlands Air Force; deliveries of the type continued until November 1956. Only 19 of the 20 aircraft ordered by the RNLAF entered service, one being destroyed in a fatal crash in the United States while being used by Fokker as a demonstrator prior to delivery. The S.14 fleet was in use for over a decade, during which a second aircraft was lost in a fatal crash in 1964. The S.14 crashed near Heenvliet, Zeeland with the loss of two crew on May 28, 1964.

Of the original production run, two aircraft were lost in accidents; the remainder were scrapped in the years following their withdrawal during the late 1960s. Three still exist today including the original prototype (K-1, PH-XIV), which was operated by the Nationaal Luchtvaartlaboratorium (NLL), located at Amsterdam Airport Schiphol, until retirement in March 1966. It was then displayed at the Aviodome museum at Schiphol before moving to the new Aviodrome museum at Lelystad Airport by 2003.

The production aircraft L-11 is preserved at the Dutch National Military Museum at the former Soesterberg Air Base. L-17 is undergoing renovation. There was a fourth, L-18, which was positioned besides one of the entrances at Fokker facility at Ypenburg, but this aircraft was scrapped during 1994 at the same time as the site was being closed down.

== Survivors ==
- The original K-1 prototype, later modified with a Nene three is at Aviodrome at Lelystad
- L-11 is preserved at Royal Netherlands Air Force museum at Soesterberg
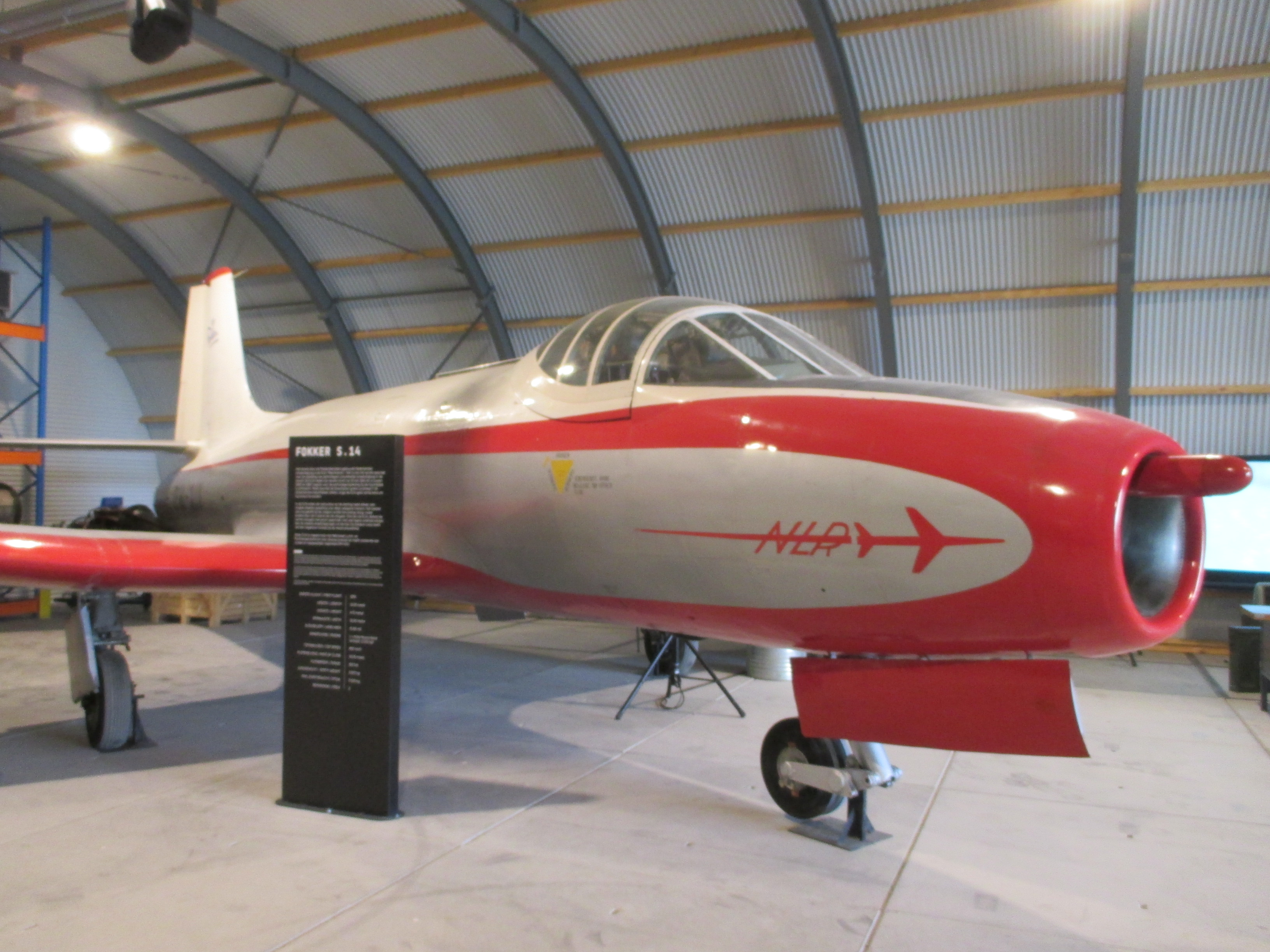
- The S14 at the Aviodrom in Leylstad
  L-17 is preserved at KLu Historical Flight at Gilze-Rijen

== Operators ==
Netherlands

- Royal Netherlands Air Force

Netherlands air and space laboratory (NLR)

- K-1 Prototype 1960–1967

== Variants ==
S.14 Machtrainer
The main production variant powered by the Rolls-Royce Derwent 8 turbojet; 21 built.

S.14 Machtrainer II
The variant intended for export powered by the Rolls-Royce Nene III turbojet; 1 built.:

== Specifications ==
Data from Twenty-One Worldbeaters

General characteristics

- Crew: 2
- Length: 13.3 m (43 ft 8 in)
- Wingspan: 12 m (39 ft 4 in)
- Height: 4.7 m (15 ft 5 in)
- Wing area: 31.8 m^{2} (342 sq ft)
- Empty weight: 3,765 kg (8,300 lb)
- Gross weight: 5,350 kg (11,795 lb)
- Powerplant: 1 × Rolls-Royce Derwent 8 centrifugal flow turbojet engine, 15.35 kN (3,450 lbf) thrust

Performance

- Maximum speed: 730 km/h (450 mph, 390 kn)
- Cruise speed: 589 km/h (366 mph, 318 kn)
- Stall speed: 142 km/h (88 mph, 77 kn)
- Range: 950 km (590 mi, 510 nmi)
- Service ceiling: 11,500 m (37,700 ft)
- Rate of climb: 16.3 m/s (3,210 ft/min)

Armament

- Guns: 2× 20 mm (0.79 in) autocannons in a detachable gun pod mounted underneath the fuselage
- Bombs: 4× 11.4 kg (25 lb) training bombs

== See also ==
Aircraft of comparable role, configuration, and era

- Cessna T-37 Tweet
- Fiat G.80
- Fouga CM.170 Magister
- Fuji T-1
- Lockheed T-33
