= Fokker S-11 =

Family of military training aircraft

S-11 Instructor
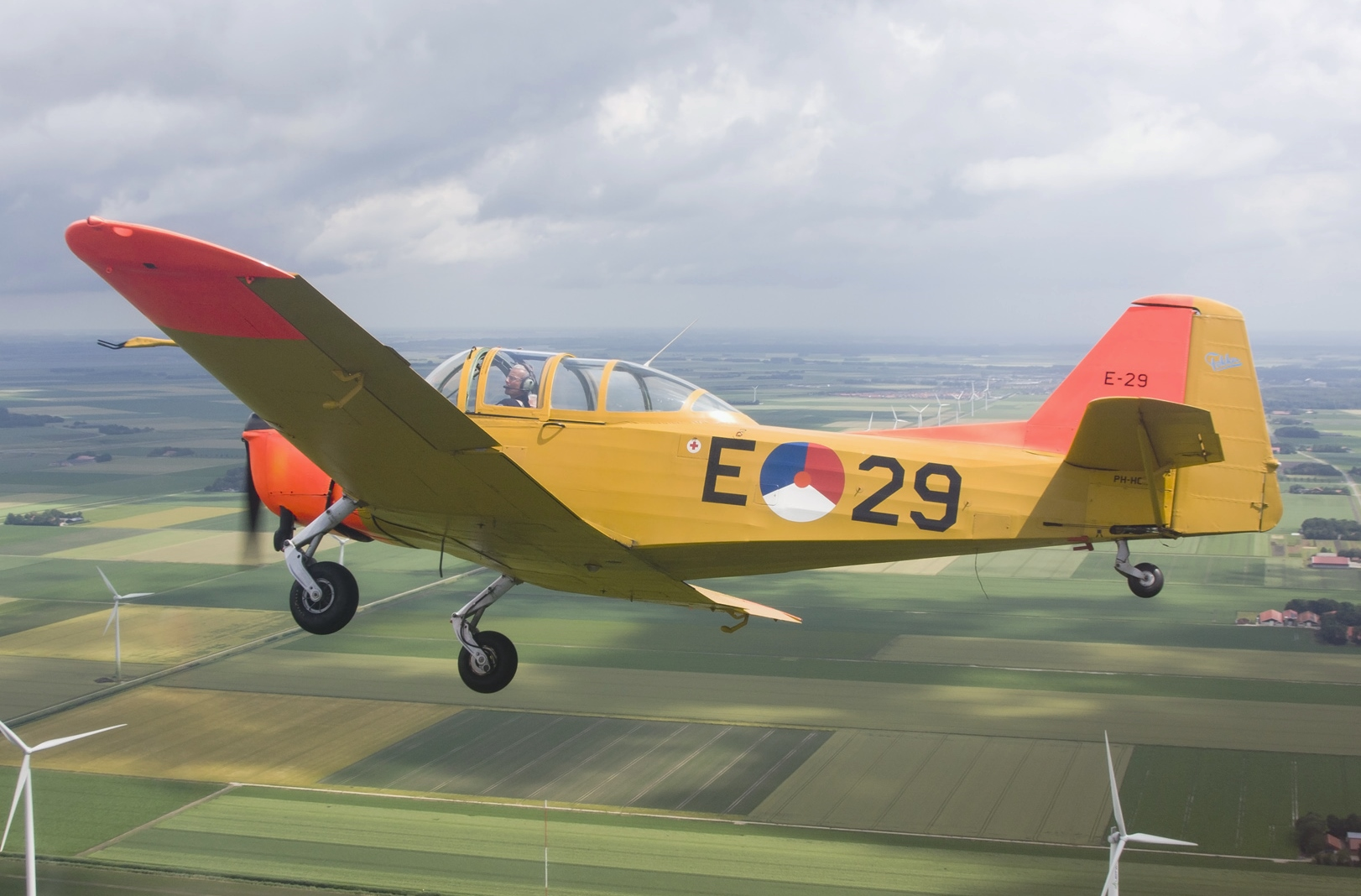
- A former Royal Netherlands Air Force S-11

General information
- Type: Trainer
- Manufacturer: Fokker
- Primary users: Royal Netherlands Air Force Royal Netherlands Navy; Brazilian Air Force; Israeli Air Force; Italian Air Force (under licence as M.416)
- Number built: S-11 375; S-12 50; YT-22 1

History
- First flight: 18 December 1947

The Fokker S-11 Instructor is a single-engine two-seater propeller aircraft designed and manufactured by the Dutch aircraft manufacturer Fokker. It first flew in December 1947 and went on production, serving in several Air Forces in the late 20th century, including with Dutch, Italian, Israeli, Paraguay, Bolivian and Brazilian armed forces. The S-12 was a tricycle landing version of this aircraft.

== History ==
One of the first activities undertaken by Fokker after World War II was the design of a new military aircraft for elementary flying training, the S-11 Instructor. An aircraft trader already placed orders for 100 of these aircraft in 1946, before construction had even begun. The first prototype flew at Schiphol on 18 December 1947. During testing in early 1948 it was found that some aerodynamic changes had to be made to improve the handling of the aircraft. Later that year demonstration flights for several air forces followed and eventually many S-11s were sold to the Royal Netherlands Air Force, Israeli Air Force, Italian Air Force, Brazilian Air Force, Paraguayan Air Force and Bolivian Air Force. Some 170 aircraft were license built in Italy as the Macchi M.416. A limited number of S-11 Instructors are still flying today. The Dutch Fokker Four foundation, dedicated to the preservation of the aircraft, operates four S-11s and amongst other activities still performs with them on airshows.

A version of the S-11 fitted with tricycle landing gear, the S-12, was built by Fokker Industria Aeronautica in Brazil, and was used by the Brazilian Air Force as the T-22 Instructor.

In Italy, 178 were produced under license by Macchi, and they were called M.416.

The aircraft is a two seat piston-powered monoplane with maximum take of weight of 1100 kg (2425 lb) and a top speed of 209 km/h (130 mph, 113 kts).

== Variants ==
S-11
Prototypes - four built
S-11-1
Production variant for the Royal Netherlands Air Force and the Naval Aviation Service of the Royal Netherlands Navy- 48 built.
S-11-2
Production variant for the Israeli Air Force - 41 built.
S-11-3
Production variant for the Italian Air Force - 180 built under license by Aermacchi (Qty 110) and IMAM (Qty 70) as the M.416
S-11-4
Production variant for the Brazilian Air Force - 99 built including 95 by Fokker Brazil.
S-12
Tricycle landing gear variant, one prototype built by Fokker and 49 production aircraft for the Brazilian Air Force built by Fokker Brazil.
Macchi M.416
Name used for licence built S-11-3 for the Italian Air Force.
T-21
Brazilian Air Force designation for the S-11-4.
T-22
Brazilian Air Force designation for the S-12.
YT-22 Guanabara
Brazilian built four-seat tricycle landing gear variant, one built

== Operators ==
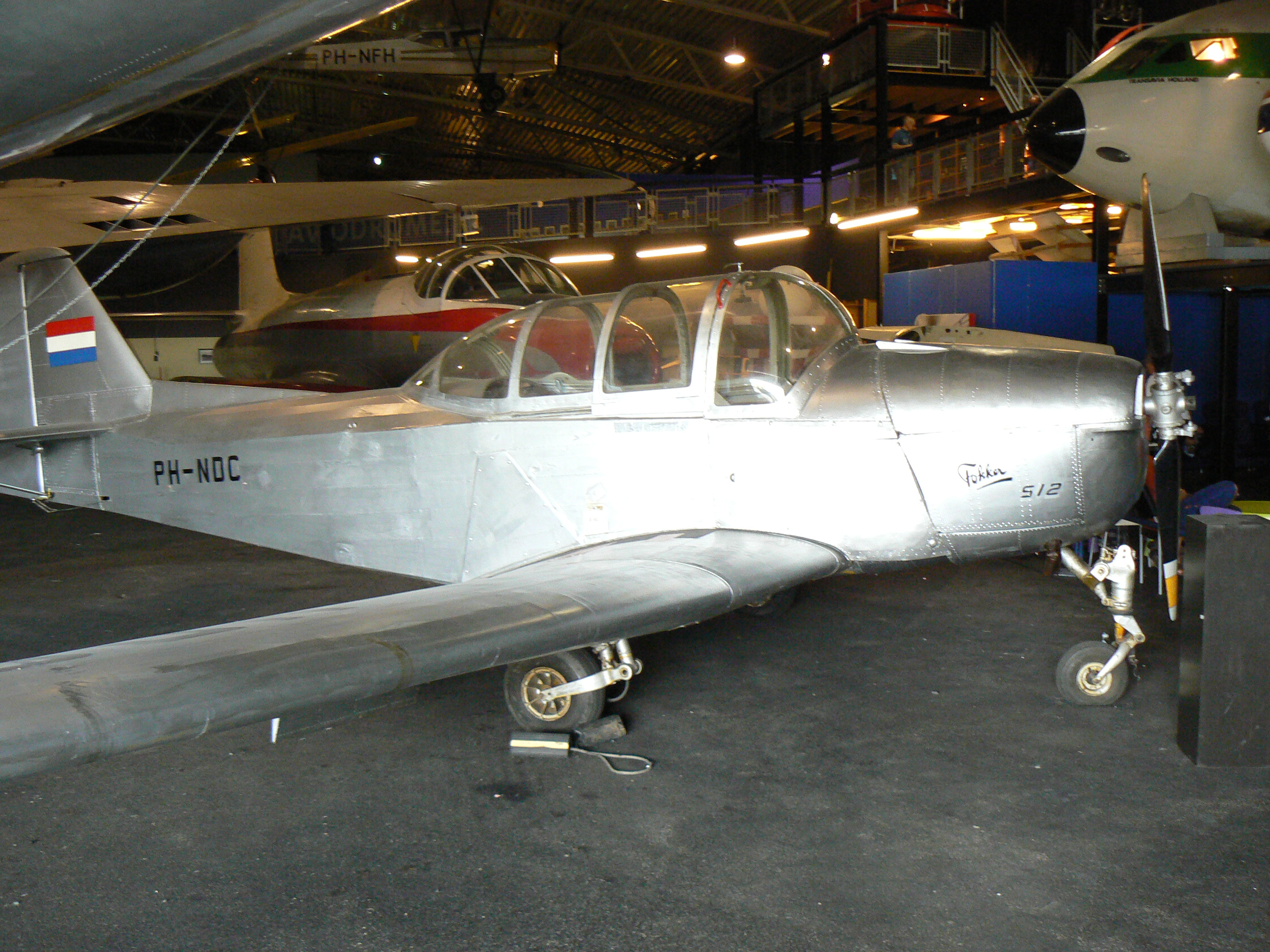
S-12 prototype in Dutch civilian markings

Brazil

- Brazilian Air Force operated 100 aircraft in the 1960s and early 1970s.

Bolivia

- Bolivian Air Force operated 8 former Brazilian aircraft in the 1970s.

Israel

- Israeli Air Force operated 41 aircraft from 1951 to 1957.

Italy

- Italian Air Force operated 178 aircraft built by Macchi under licence as Macchi M.416 from 1951 to 1960s

Netherlands

- Royal Netherlands Air Force - 39 aircraft delivered
- Royal Netherlands Navy - Dutch Naval Aviation Service - Nine aircraft delivered

Paraguay

- Paraguayan Air Force operated 8 former Brazilian aircraft from 1972 to 1978.

== Aircraft on display ==
=== Brazil ===
T-21

- 0789 - On display at the Museu Aeroespacial (Brazilian Air Force Museum), Rio de Janeiro

=== Italy ===
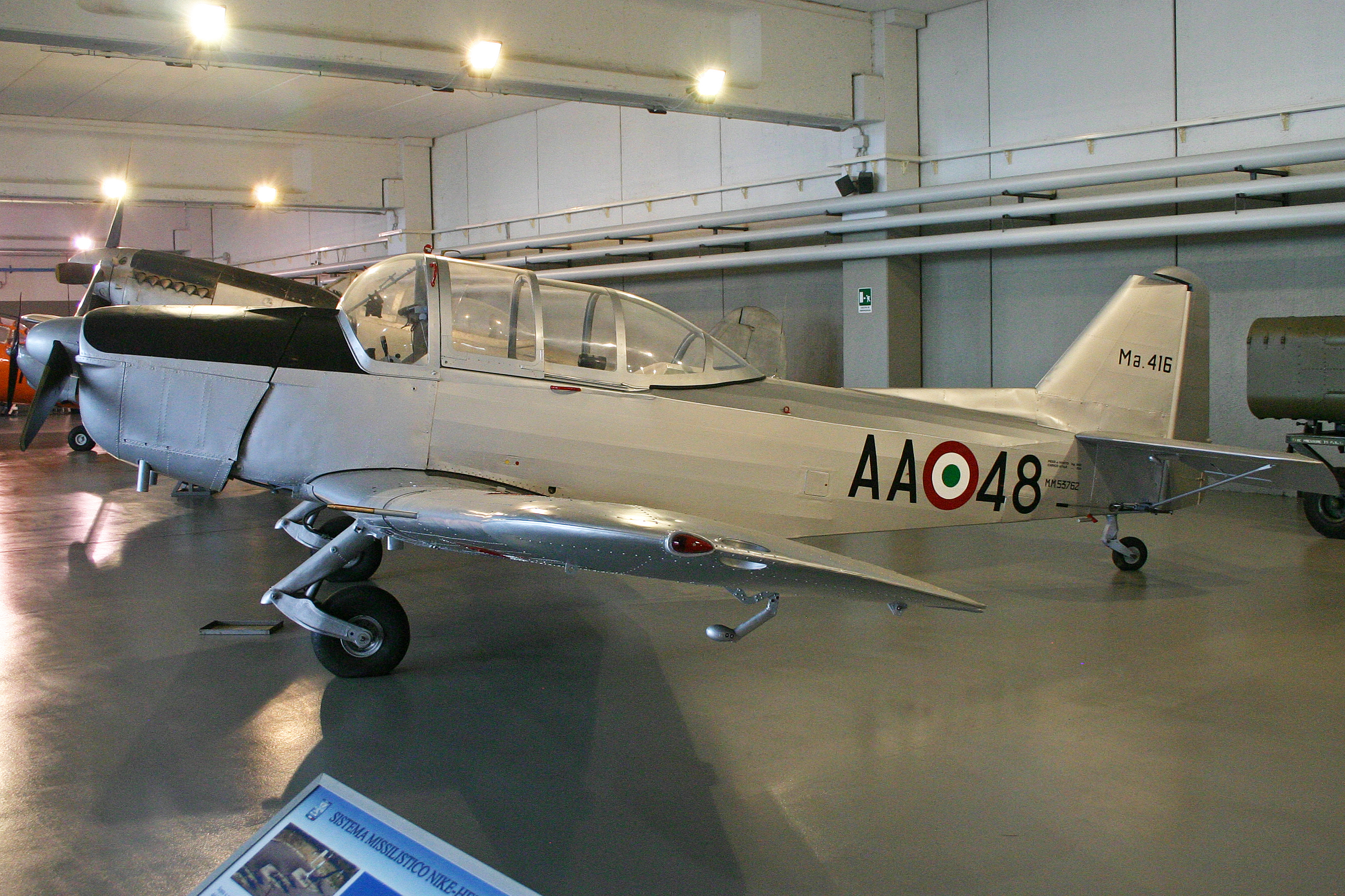
Macchi416 at the Italian Air Force Museum

Macchi M.416

- MM53194 airframe, to be restored at the Volandia Parco e Museo del Volo' (Volandia Flight Museum)
- MM53481 (ex-Aeronautica Militare Italiana plane, c/n 6037/93, civilian registered as I-AEOC). Although still carrying a valid civilian registration, it is believed to be stored at Capua airport
- MM53762 - On display at the Museo Storico dell'Aeronautica Militare di Vigna di Valle (Italian Air Force Museum in Vigna di Valle) as 'AA-48'

=== Netherlands ===
S-11

- E-22 - on display at Nationaal Militair Museum
- E-24 - in storage at Nationaal Militair Museum

S-12

- PH-NDC on display at the Aviodrome museum, Lelystad Airport. As the prototype S-12, the aircraft briefly carried the military registration E-41. In the 1950s and 1960s it became a test aircraft with Delft University, who -through the "Nederlands Instituut voor Vliegtuigontwikkeling" and its aviation development department- used it for boundary layer suction research. In the mid-1970s it was withdrawn from use and donated to the Aviodome museum at Schiphol Airport. It is currently at the Aviodrome Museum in Lelystad.

== Known airworthy aircraft ==
=== Netherlands ===
S-11-1

- E-14, E-27, E-29 and E-39 (all former Royal Netherlands Air Force (RNLAF) planes, civilian registered as PH-AFS, PH-HOG, PH-HOK and PH-HOL respectively)

Also known as 'The Fokker Four Foundation', an organization of Dutch volunteers that operate a fleet of four Fokker S-11 'Instructor' aircraft, that are able to fly and are shown to the public, at various airshows around Europe. They are based at The Aviodrome museum at Lelystad Airport, Netherlands.

- E-6, E-20, E-24, E-32 ((all former RNLAF planes) and 197 (former Royal Netherlands Navy plane), civilian registered as PH-GRB, PH-HOI, PH-HOE and PH-GRY, are with the RNLAF Historic Flight at Gilze-Rijen Air Base
- 179/K (former RNLAF E-36, civilian registered as PH-ACG) civilian owned at Lelystad Airport This plane crashed on 17 June 2023 and it is unknown whether it can be restored.
- E-25 (former RNLAF plane, ex OO-LMC, registered PH-SII) under restoration at Lelystad Airport

=== United States of America ===
- E-11 (former RNLAF plane, civilian registered as N911J) Civilian owned at CCB Cable Airport, Upland California.

== Specifications (S-11) ==
Data from Jane's All The World's Aircraft 1953–54.

General characteristics

- Crew: 2
- Length: 8.18 m (26 ft 10 in)
- Wingspan: 11.0 m (36 ft 1 in)
- Height: 2.22 m (7 ft 3 in)
- Wing area: 18.5 m^{2} (199 sq ft)
- Empty weight: 810 kg (1,786 lb)
- Gross weight: 1,100 kg (2,425 lb)
- Fuel capacity: 150 L (40 US gal; 33 imp gal)
- Powerplant: 1 × Lycoming O-435A air-cooled flat-six engine, 140 kW (190 hp)

Performance

- Maximum speed: 209 km/h (130 mph, 113 kn)
- Cruise speed: 164 km/h (102 mph, 89 kn)
- Range: 630 km (390 mi, 340 nmi)
- Service ceiling: 3,850 m (12,630 ft)
- Time to altitude:
  - 5.6 min to 1,000 m (3,300 ft)
  - 25.4 min to 3,000 m (9,800 ft)

== See also ==
Aircraft of comparable role, configuration, and era

- De Havilland Canada DHC-1 Chipmunk
- Saab 91 Safir
- T-34 Mentor

== Bibliography ==
- Aloni, Shlomo. Stearman Replacement — Replaced by a Stearman. Air Enthusiast 87, May–June 2000, pp. 41–48. ISSN 0143-5450
- Bridgeman, Leonard. Jane's All The World's Aircraft 1953–54. London: Jane's All The World's Aircraft Publishing Company, 1953.
- Smith, Maurice A. "Fokker S.11 Instructor in the Air". Flight, 24 February 1949. pp. 218–221.
