= Fokker S-13 =

Fokker S.13
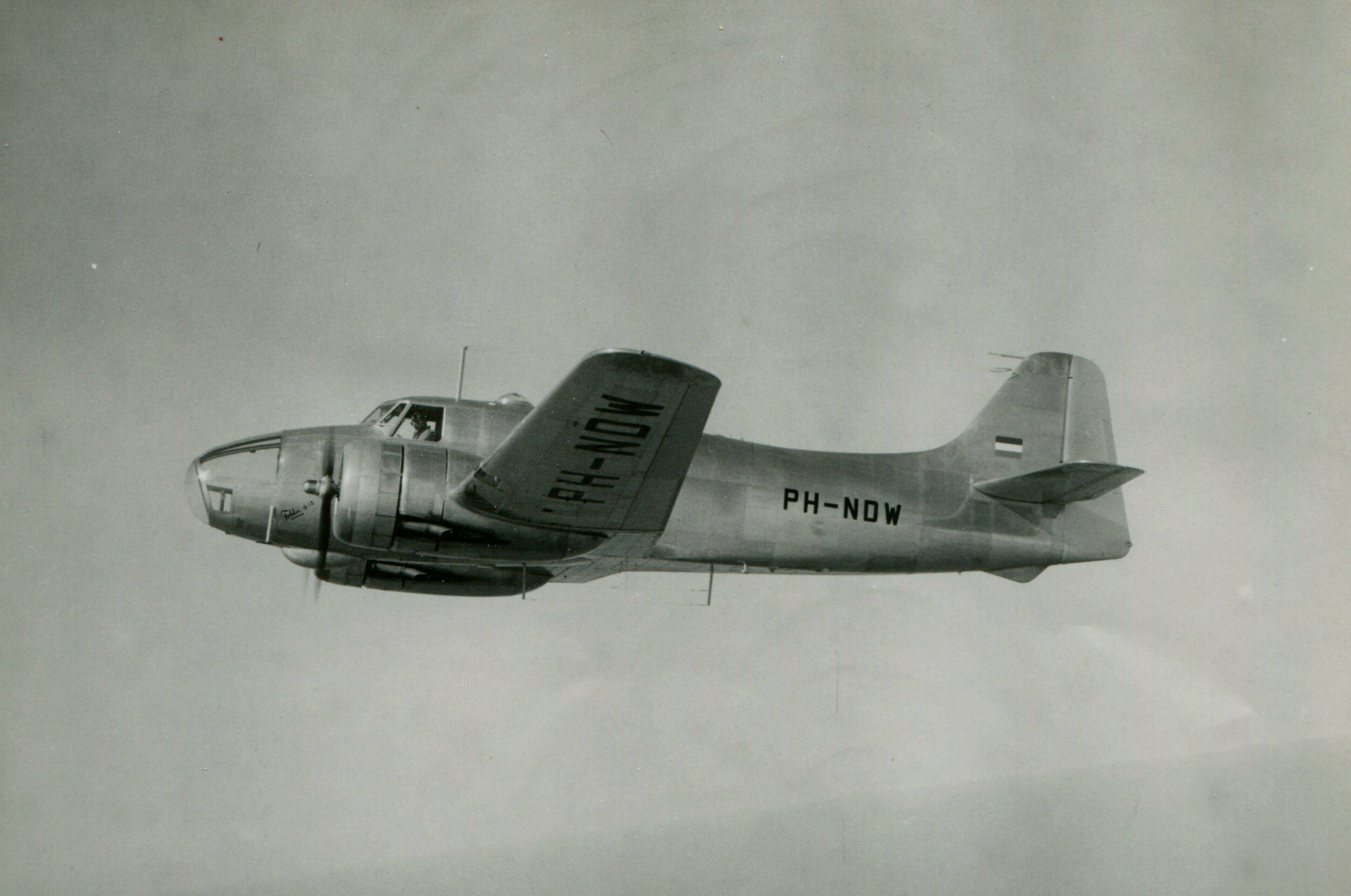

General information
- Type: training aircraft
- Manufacturer: Fokker
- Number built: 1

The Fokker S.13 Universal Trainer was a dual engine propeller aircraft for training purposes designed and manufactured by the former Dutch aircraft manufacturer Fokker. It first flew in 1949, but did not go into production. The prototype was flown a few years before being donated.

== History ==
In the early years after World War II, Fokker was resurrected with help from the national institute for aircraft development, the Nederlands Instituut voor Vliegtuigontwikkeling (NIV). Fokker expected strong demand for training aircraft, and therefore a range of designs was worked out. One of those became known as the S.13. This model, dubbed Universal Trainer, was meant to be trainer for multiple engine training, navigation training, paradropping training and training in radiotelephony. Fokker also envisaged a version for water operations, dubbed S.13W. This version had slightly different dimensions and less performance, mainly because of the floats that replaced the landing gear. Also a version for civil use was foreseen.

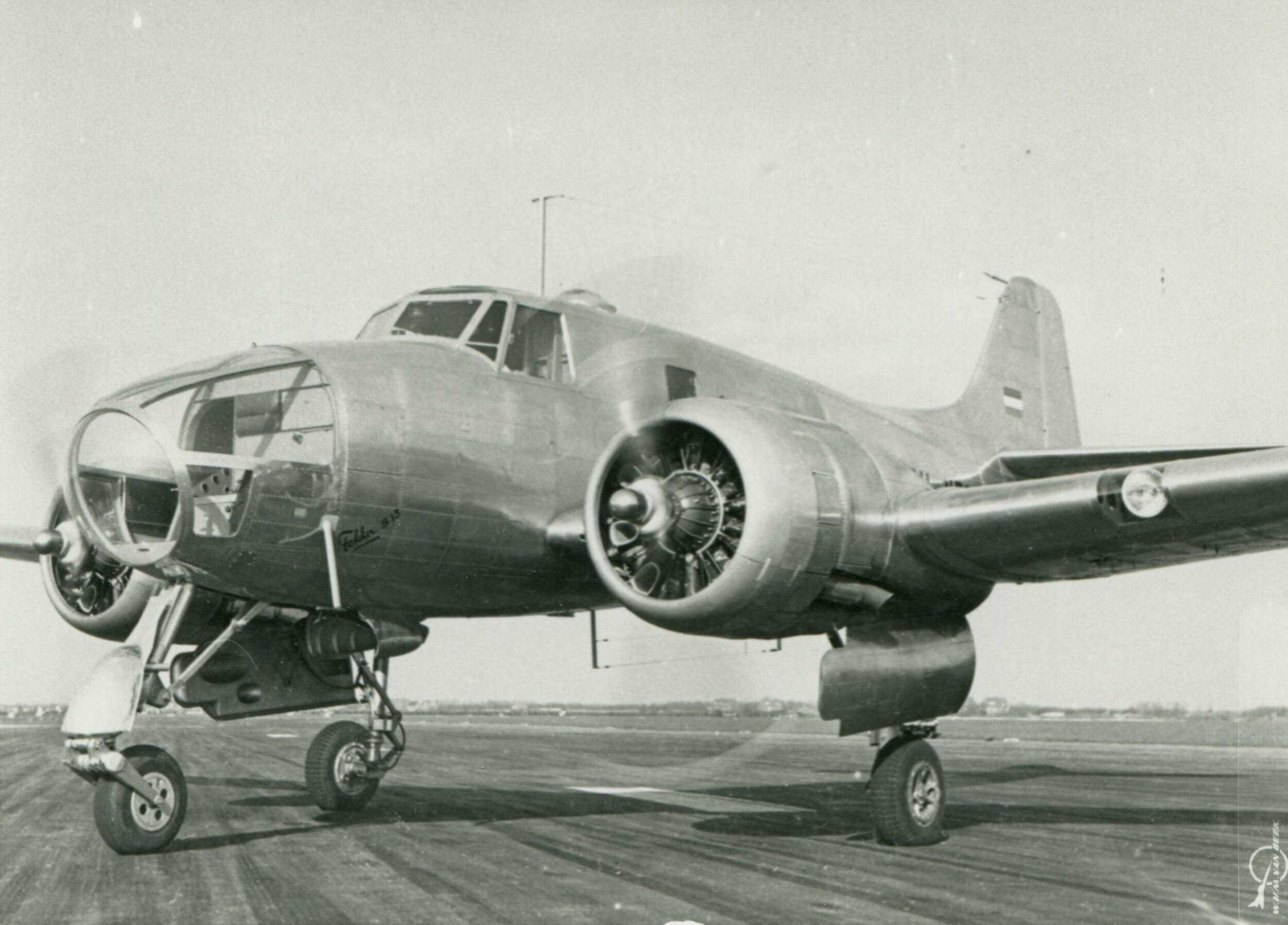

The prototype with registration PH-NDW (changed to PH-NEI in 1954) made its maiden flight in 1949. The aircraft proved to be easy handling and strong. Flight testing was successful and the Dutch armed forces intended to buy the aircraft. Shortly before deciding upon procurement, the Dutch armed forces were provided with Beechcraft Model 18s under the Mutual Defense Assistance Pact (MDAP), almost for free. As other parties did not show interest in the S.13, Fokker terminated the programme. The only existing S.13 was transferred to the NIV in 1953. Years afterwards, the airframe was donated to the aerospace faculty of the TH Delft, today known as Delft University of Technology.

During this period Fokker was also working on another training aircraft, the jet powered Fokker S.14 Machtrainer which did go into service with Dutch Airforce in 1955.

== Tactical history ==
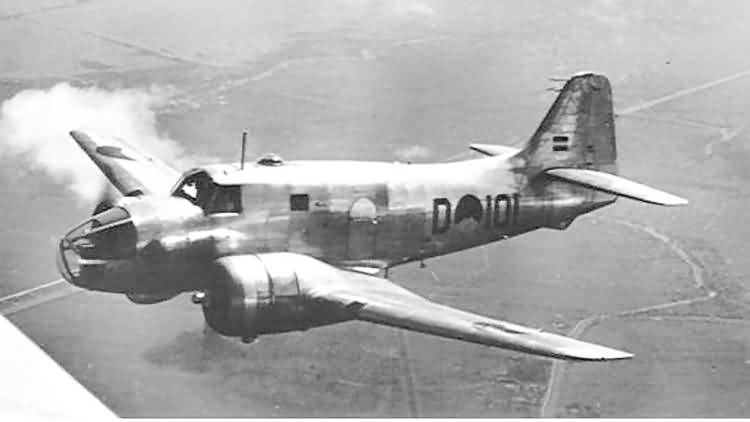
Fokker S.13

Although the Dutch armed forces never took the S.13 into service, Fokker operated the S.13 prototype in military livery. Therefore, the S.13 has flown as D-101. During the flood of February 1953, the D-101 was used for photoreconnaissance from naval air station Valkenburg.

== Remains ==
There are some S.13 relics in existence today. The cockpit section is displayed in the Aeronautical & War Museum at Texel Airport. The tailsection is owned by Aviodrome aviation museum, but currently it is not on display.

== Specifications (Fokker S-13) ==
Data from Jane's All The World's Aircraft 1953-54

General characteristics

- Crew: 7
- Length: 13.6 m (44 ft 7 in)
- Wingspan: 19.2 m (63 ft 0 in)
- Height: 5.5 m (18 ft 1 in)
- Wing area: 46.0 m^{2} (495 sq ft)
- Empty weight: 4,185 kg (9,226 lb)
- Gross weight: 5,775 kg (12,732 lb)
- Fuel capacity: 1,200 L (320 US gal; 260 imp gal)
- Powerplant: 2 × Pratt & Whitney R-1340 Wasp S1H1-G 9-cylinder air cooled radial engines, 450 kW (600 hp) each

Performance

- Maximum speed: 335 km/h (208 mph, 181 kn) 2,440 m (8,010 ft)
- Cruise speed: 320 km/h (200 mph, 170 kn) at 3,600 m (11,800 ft)
- Service ceiling: 6,500 m (21,300 ft)
- Time to altitude:
  - 2.7 min to 1,000 m (3,300 ft)
  - 9.2 min to 3,000 m (9,800 ft)
