= No. 5 Squadron RSAF =

- Active: 1958-present
- Country: Saudi Arabia
- Branch: Royal Saudi Air Force
- Type: Squadron
- Part of: RSAF 2 Wing
- Base: King Fahad Air Base, Taif
- Aircraft: McDonnell Douglas F-15C Eagle; McDonnell Douglas F-15D Eagle

No. 5 Squadron RSAF is a squadron of the Royal Saudi Air Force that operates the McDonnell Douglas F-15C Eagle and the F-15D at King Fahad Air Base, Taif, Mecca Province in Saudi Arabia within RSAF 2 Wing.

In the 1950s, the Saudi Air Force began major developments, which led to its first squadrons being established. In 1958, No. 5 Squadron RSAF was established in Jeddah Airport, equipped with 20 de Havilland Vampires.
