= No. 4 Squadron RSAF =

- Active: 1970s-present
- Country: Saudi Arabia
- Branch: Royal Saudi Air Force
- Type: Squadron
- Part of: RSAF 8 Wing
- Base: King Abdullah Air Base, Jeddah
- Aircraft: Lockheed C-130H Hercules

No. 4 Squadron RSAF is a squadron of the Royal Saudi Air Force that operates the Lockheed C-130H Hercules at King Abdullah Air Base, Jeddah, Mecca Province in Saudi Arabia within RSAF 8 Wing.

It used to fly the Lockheed C-130E in the transport and tanker role.
