= History of the oil industry in Saudi Arabia =

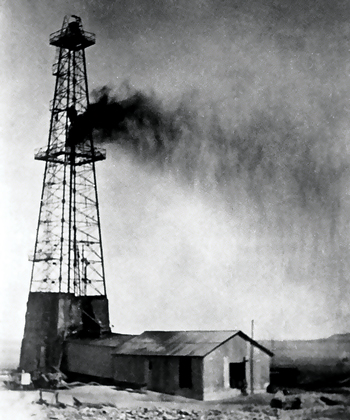
Dammam No. 7, the first commercial crude oil well in Saudi Arabia, struck oil on March 3, 1938.

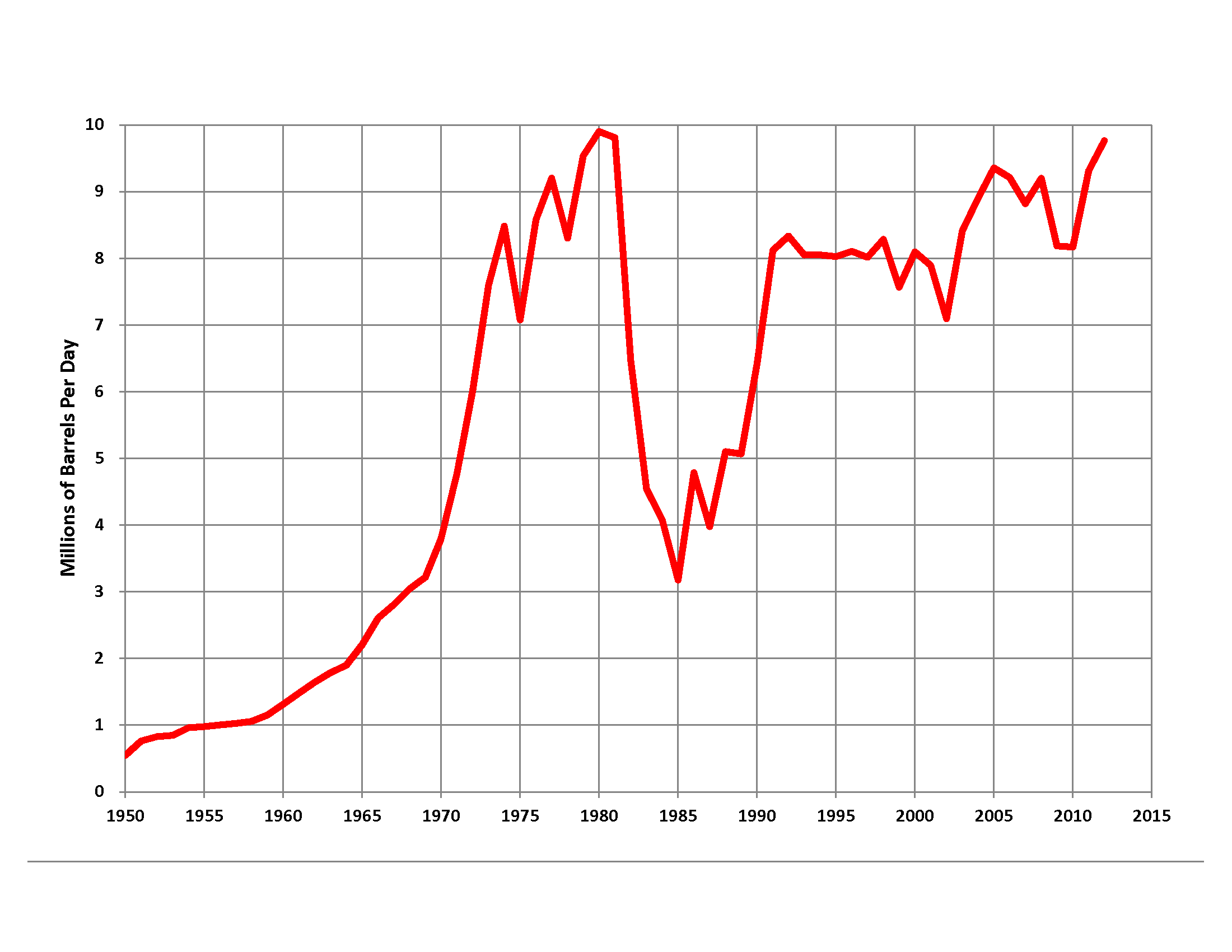
Saudi Arabia crude oil production 1950-2012

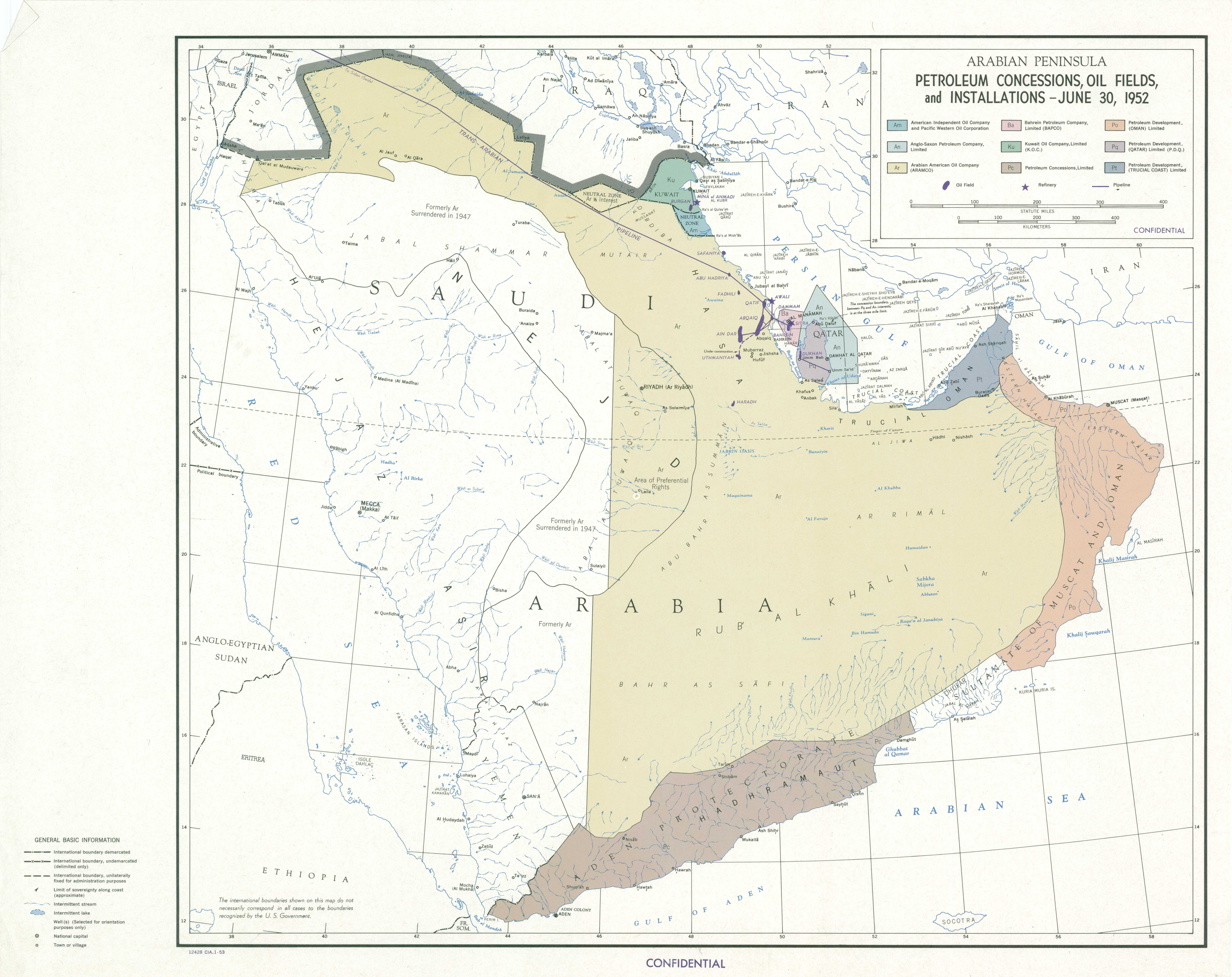
CIA map of petroleum concessions, oil fields, and installations in 1952

Saudi Arabian oil was first discovered by the Americans and British in commercial quantities at Dammam oil well No. 7 in 1938 in what is now modern day Dhahran.

== Background ==
On January 15, 1902, Ibn Saud took Riyadh from the Rashid tribe. In 1913, his forces captured the province of al-Hasa from the Ottoman Turks. In 1922, he completed his conquest of the Nejd, and in 1925, he conquered the Hijaz. In 1932, the Kingdom of Saudi Arabia was proclaimed with Ibn Saud as king. Without stability in the region, the search for oil would have been difficult, as evidenced by early oil exploration in neighbouring countries such as Yemen and Oman.

Prior to 1938, there were three main factors that triggered the search for oil in Arabia:

- The discovery of oil by the Anglo-Persian Oil Company at Masjid-i-Sulaiman in the mountains of north-western Persia in 1908; but the consensus of geological opinion at the time was that there was no oil on the Arabian peninsula, although there were rumours of an oil seepage at Qatif on the eastern seaboard of Al-Ahsa, the eastern province of Arabia.
- The demand for oil during World War I. It became obvious that oil was going to be a crucial resource in warfare for the foreseeable future. Examples that proved this were “General Gallieni’s commandeering of the Paris taxi fleet to ferry soldiers to the front. This happened when the city seemed about to fall”. In addition to this, Germany’s shortage of oil supplies hindered their ability to produce aircraft, automobiles, and engines. The allies took advantage of this by producing thousands of vehicles to aid their war effort.
- The onset of the Great Depression. Prior to the depression, a major source of income for the ruler of Hijaz was the taxes paid by pilgrims on their way to the holy cities. After the depression hit, the number of pilgrimages per year fell from 100,000 to below 40,000. This hurt their economy greatly and they needed to find alternate sources of income. This caused Ibn Saud to get serious about the search for oil.

== Initial search ==
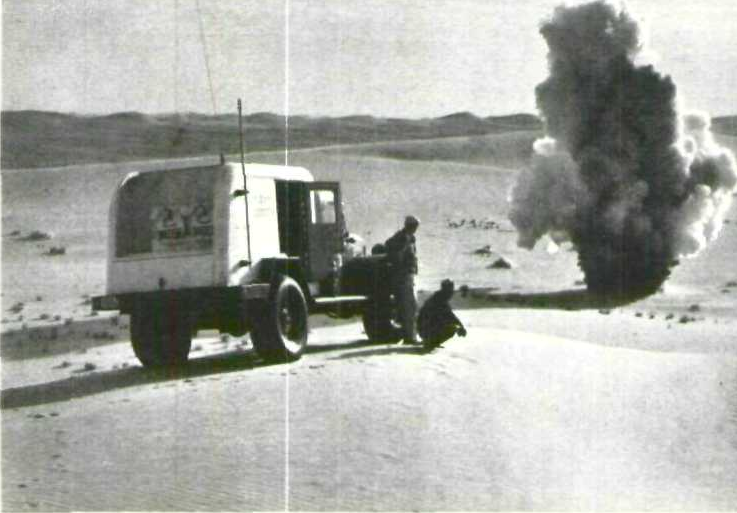
Seismic reflection survey being conducted in a desert environment, circa 1960. A controlled explosion generates seismic waves that are detected by geophones. The resulting data is processed to create a detailed image of subsurface geological structures, aiding in hydrocarbon exploration.

In 1922, Ibn Saud met a New Zealand mining engineer, Major Frank Holmes. During World War I, Holmes had been to Gallipoli and then Ethiopia, where he first heard rumours of the oil seeps of the Persian Gulf region. He was convinced that much oil would be found throughout the region. After the war, Holmes helped to set up Eastern and General Syndicate Ltd in order, among other things, to seek oil concessions in the region.

In 1923, the king signed a concession with Holmes allowing him to search for oil in eastern Saudi Arabia. Eastern and General Syndicate brought in a Swiss geologist to evaluate the land, but he claimed that searching for oil in Arabia would be “a pure gamble”. This discouraged the major banks and oil companies from investing in Arabian oil ventures.

In 1925, Holmes signed a concession with the sheikh of Bahrain, allowing him to search for oil there. He then proceeded to the United States to find an oil company that might be interested in taking on the concession. He found help from Gulf Oil. In 1927, Gulf Oil took control of the concessions that Holmes made years ago. But Gulf Oil was a partner in the Iraq Petroleum Company, which was jointly owned by Royal Dutch — Shell, Anglo-Persian, the Compagnie Française des Pétroles (ancestor of French major TotalEnergies), and "the Near East Development Company", representing the interests of the American companies. The partners had signed up to the “Red Line Agreement”, which meant that Gulf Oil was precluded from taking up the Bahrain concession without the consent of the other partners; and they declined. Despite a promising survey in Bahrain, Gulf Oil was forced to transfer its interest to another company, Standard Oil of California (SOCAL), which was not bound by the Red Line Agreement.

Meanwhile Ibn Saud had dispatched American mining engineer Karl Twitchell to examine eastern Arabia. Twitchell found encouraging signs of oil, asphalt seeps in the vicinity of Qatif, but advised the king to await the outcome of the Bahrain No.1 well before inviting bids for a concession for Al-Ahsa. To the American engineers working in Bahrain, standing on the Jebel Dukhan and gazing across a twenty-mile (32 km) stretch of the Persian Gulf at the Arabian Peninsula in the clear light of early morning, the outline of the low Dhahran hills in the distance were an obvious oil prospect.

On 31 May 1932, the SOCAL subsidiary, the Bahrain Petroleum Company (BAPCO) struck oil in Bahrain. The discovery brought fresh impetus to the search for oil on the Arabian peninsula.

Negotiations for an oil concession for al-Hasa province opened at Jeddah in March, 1933. Twitchell attended with lawyer Lloyd Hamilton on behalf of SOCAL. The Iraq Petroleum Company represented by Stephen Longrigg competed in the bidding, but SOCAL was granted the concession on 23 May 1933. Under the agreement, SOCAL was given “exploration rights to some 930,000 square kilometers of land for 60 years”. Soon after the agreement, geologists arrived in al-Hasa and the search for oil was underway.

== Discovery of oil ==
SOCAL set up a subsidiary company, the California Arabian Standard Oil Company (CASOC) to develop the oil concession. SOCAL also joined forces with the Texas Oil Company when together they formed CALTEX in 1936 to take advantage of the latter's formidable marketing network in Africa and Asia.

When CASOC geologists surveyed the concession area, they identified a promising site and named it Dammam No. 7, after a nearby village. Over the next three years, the drillers were unsuccessful in making a commercial strike, but chief geologist Max Steineke persevered. He urged the team to drill deeper, even when Dammam No. 7 was plagued by cave-ins, stuck drill bits and other problems, before the drillers finally struck oil on 3 March 1938. This discovery would turn out to be first of many, eventually revealing the largest source of crude oil in the world. For Ibn Saud, oil revenues became a crucial source of wealth since he no longer had to rely on pilgrimages to Mecca for finances.

Following the success of Dammam No. 7, CASOC sought to expand operations by identifying a second oil field to justify its investments. In early 1939, drilling commenced at Abu Hadriya, 160 kilometers northwest of Dhahran. Geologist Thomas Barger, later Aramco’s CEO (1961–1969), documented the campaign’s high stakes in personal correspondence, noting that failure would undermine confidence in regional exploration.

The Abu Hadriya well reached depths exceeding 3,000 meters (10,000 feet) by early 1940—twice the depth of Dammam No. 7—but yielded no oil. Despite arguments to continue drilling, CASOC’s board ordered operations to cease. This decision redirected efforts to Abqaiq, where drilling began in 1941.

== Changes to the original concession ==
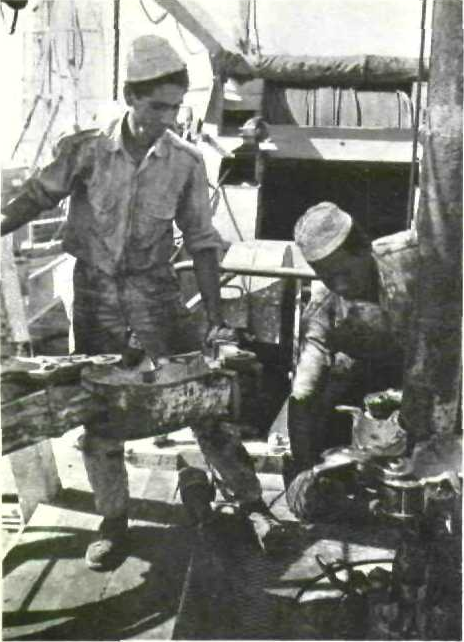
Oil rig workers performing maintenance on drilling equipment, 1960

In 1943, the name of the company in control in Saudi Arabia was changed to Arabian American Oil Company (ARAMCO). In addition, numerous changes were made to the original concession after the striking of oil. In 1939, the first modification gave the Arabian American Oil Company a greater area to search for oil and extended the concession until 1949, increasing the original deal by six years. In return, ARAMCO agreed to provide the Saudi Arabian government with large amounts of free kerosene and gasoline, and to pay higher payments than originally stipulated.

Beginning in 1950, the Saudi Arabian government began a pattern of trying to increase government shares of revenue from oil production. In 1950, a fifty-fifty profit-sharing agreement was signed, whereby a tax was levied by the government. This tax considerably increased government revenues. The government continued this trend well into the ‘80s. By 1982, ARAMCO’s concession area was reduced to 220,000 square kilometers, down from the original 930,000 square kilometers. By 1988, ARAMCO was officially bought out by Saudi Arabia and became known as Saudi Aramco.

== Tapline ==
Due to the quantity of the oil in Saudi Arabia, construction of pipelines became necessary to increase efficiency of production and transport. ARAMCO soon realized that “advantages of a pipeline to the Mediterranean Sea seemed obvious, saving about 3,200 kilometers of sea travel and the transit fees of the Suez Canal”. In 1945, the Trans-Arabian Pipeline Company (Tapline) was started and was completed in 1950. The pipeline greatly increased efficiency of oil transport, but also had its shortcomings. Issues concerning taxes and damages plagued it for years. It had to be shut down numerous times for repairs, and by 1983 was officially shut down.

== Yom Kippur War ==
The Yom Kippur War was a conflict between Egypt, Syria, and their backers and Israel. Because the United States was a supporter of Israel, the Arab countries participated in an oil boycott of Canada, Japan, the Netherlands, the United Kingdom, and the United States. This boycott later included Portugal, Rhodesia, and South Africa. This was one of the major causes of the 1973 energy crisis that occurred in the United States. After the completion of the war, the price of oil increased drastically allowing Saudi Arabia to gain much wealth and power.

== See also ==
- Oil reserves in Saudi Arabia
- Energy in Saudi Arabia
