= Energy in Bahrain =

Bahrain electricity production by source

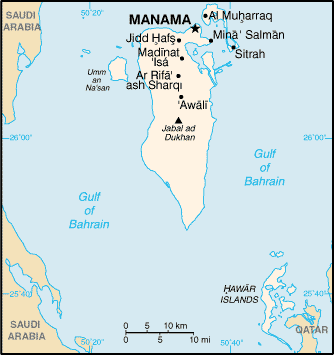
Location

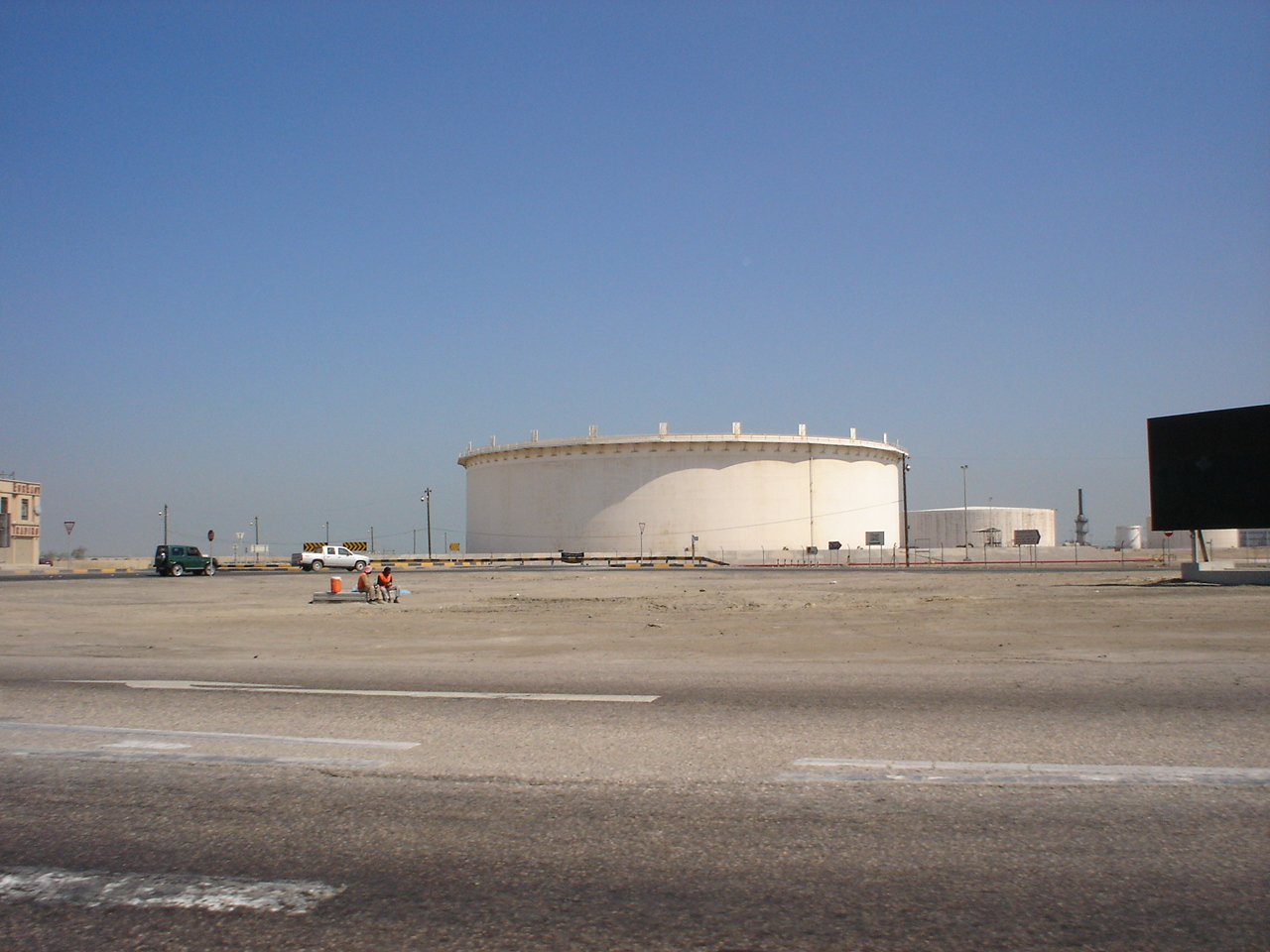
Oil tanks in Sitra, Bahrain

Energy in Bahrain is almost completely derived from fossil fuels. Bahrain is a net energy exporter, but the country's oil and natural gas reserves are declining, while the rate of energy consumption is among the highest in the world. In response, the government is diversifying its economy (and government revenue) from its dependence on fossil fuels, improving its energy efficiency, importing more natural gas and exploring renewable energy.

== Overview ==
Primary energy use was approximately 514.3 million BTU (542 million kJ) per capita in 2022.

In 2024 99.8% (0.8 exajoules) of Bahrain's energy came from fossil fuels versus 0.24% (0.0021 exajoules) from renewable sources.

Energy in Bahrain
| | Capita | Prim. energy | Production | Export | Electricity | CO_{2}-emission |
| | Million | TWh | TWh | TWh | TWh | Mt |
|---|---|---|---|---|---|---|
| 2004 | 0.72 | 87 | 184 | 101 | 7.77 | 16.95 |
| 2007 | 0.75 | 102 | 198 | 94 | 10.75 | 21.26 |
| 2008 | 0.77 | 107 | 203 | 79 | 10.19 | 22.30 |
| 2009 | 0.79 | 110 | 204 | 65 | 10.78 | 22.82 |
| 2010 | 1.26 | 114 | 206 | 79 | 12.38 | 23.62 |
| 2012R | 1.32 | 147 | 230 | 77 | 23.20 | 28.81 |
| 2013 | 1.33 | 160 | 256 | 92 | 24.58 | 28.30 |
| Change 2004-10 | 75.0% | 30.6% | 11.9% | -21.8% | 59.3% | 39.4% |
Mtoe = 11.63 TWh, Prim. energy includes energy losses 2012R = CO2 calculation criteria changed, numbers updated

== Oil ==
In 1932, Bahrain became the first place on the Arabian side of the Persian Gulf where oil was discovered. The first oil well, situated below Jabal al Dukhan, has been run since 1932 by Bahrain Petroleum Company (BAPCO). BAPCO was originally owned by Standard Oil Company of California, but was taken over by the government of Bahrain in 1980.

In 2023, the petroleum production of Bahrain was rated at about 189,000 barrels per day. The petroleum reserves were quoted as 168 million barrels in 2023.

BAPCO's refinery on Sitra Island is Bahrain's largest oil refinery. In 2025, its capacity was increased from 380,000 barrels a day to 405,000. On 9 March 2026, the refinery was attacked by Iran.

== Gas ==
Natural gas was first discovered in 1948. As of 2023, Bahrain was said to produce 16.7 billion cubic meters (bcm) of natural gas per year and have reserves of 68 bcm. The country uses all the natural gas it produces, and is seeking to import more from neighboring countries to keep up with demand; it powers Bahrain's two main industries, refining and aluminum smelting.

Bahrain National Gas Company (Banagas) is a large natural gas company which was founded in 1979 by Shaikh Isa bin Salman Al Khalifa.

== See also ==
- List of power stations in Bahrain
