= William Richard Williamson =

English adventurer (1872–1958)

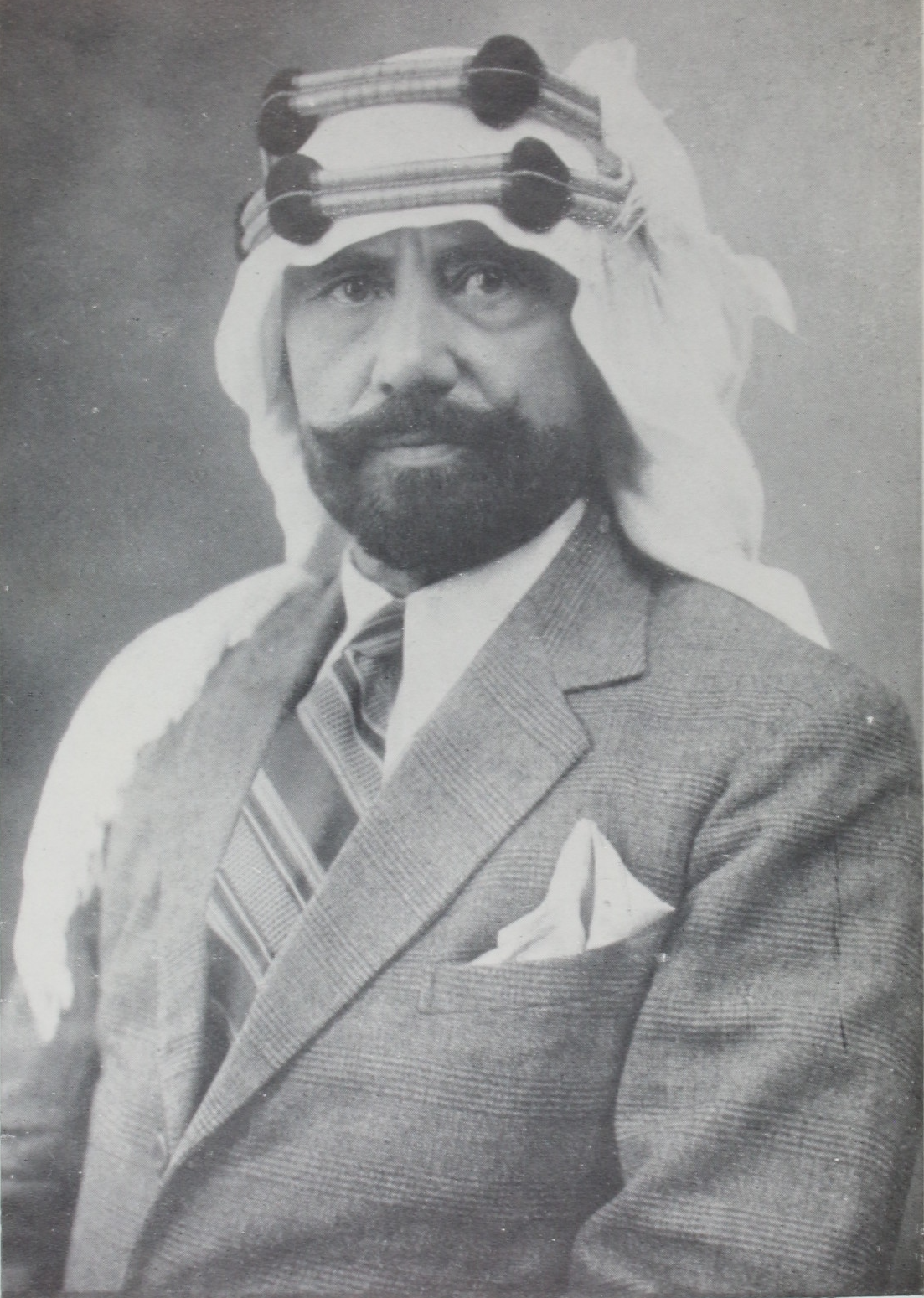
Image of Haji Williamson

William Richard ("Haji") Williamson (1872–1958) was an English adventurer who became an oil company representative in the Persian Gulf.

== Early life ==
Williamson's early life was packed with adventure. Born in Bristol in 1872 and educated at Clifton High School, he left school at the age of 13 to enlist on his uncle's tea-clipper bound for Australia and the United States. When the vessel docked at San Diego, Williamson jumped ship and found work on a farm near Los Angeles, then with his aunt on her homestead. Intending to prospect for gold, Williamson acquired a mule and shotgun and travelled to the Nevada where he acquired a mine. When this venture ended in failure, Williamson went to San Francisco and enlisted on a cargo ship bound for Bordeaux.

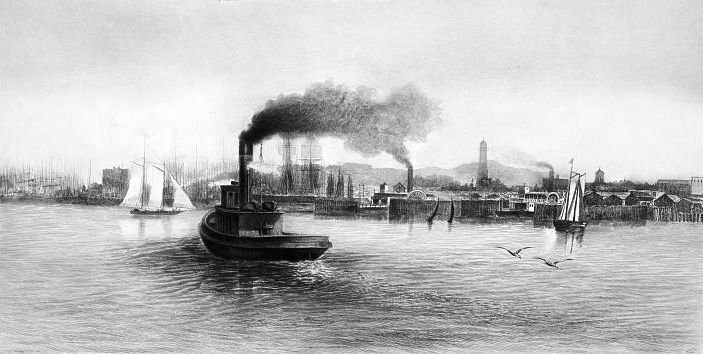
San Francisco Bay c.1889

Following a brief visit to France, Williamson returned to California via the Panama Canal and undertook various activities: investing unsuccessfully in a railway company, taking part in a vaudeville act and trying his luck as an amateur boxer but it was not long before he returned to the sea.

Williamson became fourth mate on a whaler which sailed to the Bering Straits returning again to San Francisco after an eight-month voyage. He then enlisted for a trading voyage to the South Seas and settled for a time in the Caroline Islands, trading in sea-cucumbers. But he was arrested for selling rifles to rebel tribesmen and was incarcerated in a Manila jail. After bribing a guard, Williamson escaped to the American consul Alexander Russell Webb and boarded a British ship bound for Hong Kong. He pursued a seafaring career as quartermaster of the SS Chusan. Then, after a brief sojourn in Bombay, he boarded the SS Siam for the British colony of Aden. On his arrival, he joined the Aden Constabulary. Already interested in Islam, he undertook Islamic study in Aden and, after a year had passed, he made his formal shahada, was circumcised and changed his name to Abdullah Fadhil. This did not go down well with the Aden authorities who packed him off to India where Williamson was discharged from the Constabulary.

== Trade and pearls ==
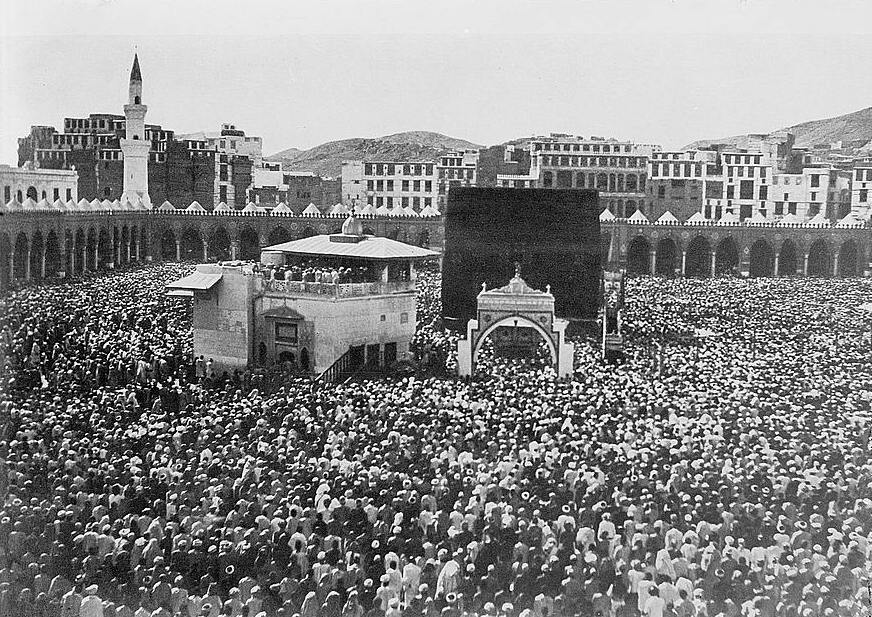
Mecca, ca. 1910. Bird's-eye view of Kaaba crowded with pilgrims

Williamson’s next incarnation was as a trader of camels and horses in Arabia, Iraq and Kuwait. With the money he acquired from this venture, in 1894 he was able to join the Hajj caravan to Mecca and thus gained the sobriquet “Haji”. Thereafter Williamson traded horses with the British Army in Bombay and imported foreign goods to his home town of Zubair in Iraq. On one occasion, he caused uproar when he appeared in the local suq on a penny-farthing bicycle, never before seen in those parts.

Relations with the British were changeable: they suspected him of gun running in the Persian Gulf and yet were happy to use him as a secret agent and spy hunter during World War I. In later years, his trading interests in the Persian Gulf meant that he veered towards legitimacy. The profits of horse-trading allowing him to buy a dhow, he undertook a number of voyages around the Persian Gulf. He regularly met Royal Navy gunboats as they criss-crossed the Persian Gulf in stop and search operations to suppress an illicit trade in rifles, slaves and contraband.

Williamson also tried his hand in the pearling business, joining the great pearling fleet in the Persian Gulf. The pearling season known al-Ghaus al-Kabir (“The Big Dive”) ran from May to September when a fleet of some 4,000 dhows ranging from the regular sambuk to the larger boum and baghlah would set out from the many ports of the Persian Gulf. Each carried a master, mate, divers, assistant divers and apprentices drawn from those ports, Oman and beyond. Their purpose was to fish for the most valuable pearls. The venture was not particularly successful and, with a large family to support, a steady job was an attractive proposition.

== Kuwait ==
=== Appointment to Anglo-Persian ===
In the 1920s, the Anglo-Persian Oil Company was struggling to counter Major Frank Holmes' influence in Kuwait. Looking around for a local man to help the company in its dealings with the local Arabs, managing director Sir Arnold Wilson remembered Williamson from his days in Iraq. An Englishman who had “gone native” seemed an obvious choice as interpreter, guide and general factotum, so Wilson sent for Williamson and offered him a job. Williamson had long since adopted the dress and customs of a town Arab. But when doing business with Westerners, he would put on a navy-blue suit with double-breasted jacket while retaining an Arab headdress and toying with his prayer beads, in those days an eccentric fusion of east and west.

In 1924, Anglo Persian gave Williamson a family house in Abadan, appointed him “Inspector of Gulf Agencies” and sent him to Kuwait where he set about persuading sheikhly advisers to switch their allegiances from Major Frank Holmes to Anglo Persian. He also assisted the Anglo-Persian representative, Archibald Chisolm, in the negotiations. Williamson was to do what he could to counter Holmes' influence, which including providing the sheikh's advisers with free meals and gifts. But in 1933 Anglo-Persian joined forces with Gulf Oil leaving Williamson out of the negotiations and, in 1935, the two companies concluded a concession agreement from the sheikh.

=== Relations with Major Frank Holmes ===
Frank Holmes, a New Zealand-British mining engineer who had made his name as an oil concession hunter, was already highly regarded by the Gulf Arabs. Although Holmes and Williamson were cast on opposite sides of the competition in Kuwait (Holmes represented Gulf Oil), they were of a similar ilk, both independent with a strong empathy for the Arab point of view. However, they hated each other with a passion and developed a rivalry which led Williamson (perhaps melodramatically) to believe that his life was in danger, constantly looking over his shoulder for an assassin trailing in his wake. In fact, most of their rivalry was played out in the grand lunches they threw for the notables engaged in the oil negotiations.

== Qatar and Abu Dhabi ==
In 1925, Williamson acted as interpreter, guide and general factotum to the Anglo-Persian survey of Qatar led by George Martin Lees. Williamson returned there in 1934 with Anglo-Persian representative Charles Mylles to secure an oil concession from the ruler, Sheikh Abdullah bin Jassim Al-Thani, but negotiations faltered and Mylles had to return in order to complete the agreement on 17 May 1935.

Williamson acted in a similar capacity for the first visits of Anglo-Persian geologists to Abu Dhabi in 1934, and was responsible for signing the first oil concession for that country in January 1935. He returned in 1936 to guide another oil survey for Petroleum Development (Trucial Coast) Limited. “We landed from the Gulf mail steamer at Dubai after a day and night lying to and waiting until one of the most violent storms of thunder and rain we had ever experienced had blown itself out,” wrote one of the geologists. “During the first few months in Dubai we were advised never to leave the house without an armed escort, as we were the first Europeans to live in the town and it was considered desirable to accustom the local populace gradually to our presence.”

The party travelled inland with the sheikh and his followers who used each occasion as an excuse for hunting. “With our two cars, we had the sheikh’s and at least one other filled with his men, 6 or 8 to a car, each with his saddle bag of belongings and his rifle. Room had also to be found for cooking pots and one or two hawks, while on one occasion a large saluki (greyhound) was also squeezed in. Our routes followed camel trails, the only tracks of any kind which existed, and as most of the country was sand the cars were very often stuck.”

However, there were lingering suspicions among British officials that Williamson was favouring local sheikhs over the interests of the oil company. By 1937, there were still five Gulf sheikhs due to sign oil concession agreements. Frank Holmes at this time was acting for Petroleum Concessions Ltd (PCL), an associate company of the Iraq Petroleum Company, and Williamson (also employed by PCL) began to intrigue against him. Williamson sent a letter – intercepted by the British - to the sheikh of Ras Al Khaimah encouraging him to hold out for better terms from PCL. Williamson also sent a man to the sheikh of Kalba in order to stiffen his resistance against the company. For the British Political Resident, this was the last straw. On 27 July, he wrote that it was “undesirable that Williamson should be employed anywhere on the Arab coast.” So Williamson retired from company life and returned to his family and a quiet life in his house in Zubair.

== Retirement and death ==
Williamson had married twice, one of his wives coming from Zubair and the other from Baghdad, and fathered several children. He retired into typical Arab life at Kut-el-Hajjaj near Basra where he supervised daily work on the date palm and orange tree plantations on his estate. As well as enjoying the company of his children and grandchildren, he liked to read penny-Westerns with titles like Two-Gun Pete and Mayhem in Dodge City. He remained a devout follower of Islam and was a regular visitor to the Ashar Mosque in Basra. He died in 1958.

== Conspiracy theory ==
In recent years, a conspiracy theory has emerged that the British secretly backed Ayatollah Khomeini in overthrowing the Shah of Iran, Mohammad Reza Pahlavi, in 1979. One aspect of this theory is a claim that Khomeini was a son of Haji Williamson. Proponents of the theory have never produced primary evidence—such as birth records, correspondence, diaries, or contemporary eyewitness testimony—connecting Williamson to Khomeini's mother. The claim appears in polemical works and political propaganda rather than in documented historical research. Moreover, Khomeini's actual lineage is well documented.
