= Bahrain Petroleum Company =

State-owned oil company of Bahrain

- Trade name: BAPCO
- Type: State-owned enterprise
- Industry: Petroleum
- Founded: 1929 (original company) (Note: incorporated as the Bahrein Petroleum Co. on January 11, 1929 in Canada under British Dominion law, name changed to Bahrain Petroleum Co. as of January 1, 1953); 1999 (current company)
- Founder: Standard Oil Company of California (original company)
- Headquarters: Awali, Bahrain
- Key people: Abdulrahman Jawahery (CEO)
- Owner: Bapco Energies
- Website: www.bapco.net

The Bahrain Petroleum Company (BAPCO) is an integrated petroleum company that is the national oil company of Bahrain.

It was founded in 1929 and discovered the first oil field in the Persian Gulf outside of Iran in 1932. Shipments of crude oil commenced in 1934 and in 1936 the first refinery in the Gulf outside of Iran was built. The founders were the American Standard Oil of California, which was soon joined by Texaco, operating under British rule.

While Bahrain never was a high-volume crude oil producer, the American joint venture a few years later came into possession of the vast Saudi Arabian oil reserves, which are located on the mainland in the vicinity of Bahrain Island. Supplied from the mainland, the refinery though exceeded the capacity of the Bahrain oil field from its inception and was among the largest in the region.

The Bahrain concession was the first of three concessions awarded exclusively to American interests in the Middle East and was followed by Aramco in Saudi Arabia and by the joint venture active in the Saudi Arabian–Kuwaiti neutral zone.

== Overview ==
BAPCO was established in 1929 in Canada by Standard Oil Company of California for oil exploration activities in Bahrain. It took over Bahrain's assets of Gulf Oil. In 1930 it obtained the only oil concession in Bahrain. BAPCO discovered first oil in 1931. On 31 May 1932, the company discovered the Bahrain Field (Awali Field). After exporting oil and constructing a refinery, it started with 10,000 barrels per day (1,600 m^{3}/d) refining capacity in 1936. Later that year the Standard Oil Company of California signed an agreement with Texaco, which acquired a half of BAPCO's shares.

In 1975, more than 60% BAPCO's shares was acquired by the Government of Bahrain. In 1980, all BAPCO's shares were taken over by the Government of Bahrain. In 1978 the oil sector was nationalized and BAPCO assumed full control of the national energy sector.

In 1999, the current Bahrain Petroleum Company was created when the Bahrain National Oil Company, established in 1976, merged with BAPCO. In 2018 BAPCO commissioned a new pipeline that replaced the over 70 years old pipeline infrastructure between Bahrain and Saudi Arabia. In March 2019 construction work was started to upgrade the main oil refinery Sitra. The $5 billion project will increase the capacity to 380,000 barrels per day (60,000 m^{3}/d). Abdulrahman Jawahery is CEO of the BAPCO.

In August 2021, BAPCO signed a five year agreement for catalyst management with Chevron Joint Venture for $240 million. The clean fuels group specialist Advanced Refining Technologies (ART), which is a joint venture of Chevron and W. R. Grace and Company, will supply there Resid Hyrdocracking catalyst technology for the new Resid Hydrocracking unit (1RHCU) that is to be operational by 2023.

In October 2021, BAPCO was released from the base oils joint venture with Neste and Nogaholding, ending the presence of Neste in Bahrain.

In February 2022, BAPCO signed a memorandum of understanding (MoU) with Aluminium Bahrain B.S.C. (Alba) for the implementation of environment, social and governance (ESG) initiatives.

In 2023, BAPCO became part of the BAPCO Energies brand together with Bahrain National Gas Company (Banagas), Bahrain National Gas Expansion Company (Tawseah), Bahrain Aviation Fueling Company (Bafco) Tatweer Petroleum, and Bapco Retail Company (Tazweed).

BAPCO is a founding company of the Gulf Downstream Association (GDA).

The Bapco Modernisation Programme (BMP) completed the construction of the main control building in July 2023 and celebrated with a ceremony, in which for the first time ever in the Middle East a three-dimensional model of the BMP was presented. The ceremony was attended by Nasser bin Hamad Al Khalifa, who was also given a tour of the facilities and briefed about further BMP project progress. The BMP was 90% complete by August 2023.

In July 2023, Bapco Energies launched its Sustainability Linked Finance Framework, which fits into Bahrain's sustainability and climate change commitments to reduce emissions by 30% by 2035 and a net zero by 2060. In accordance with Bahrain's new energy strategy, Bapco Energies B.S.C began additional developments in August 2023 to become an energy company with fossil fuel based renewable energies. The company aims to generate 20% of Bahrain's energy from renewable sources by 2035 and continues to seek investment opportunities in renewable energy projects and carbon reduction technologies.

In March 2024, BAPCO began a cooperation with TotalEnergies in order to optimize its Sitra refinery. A strategic partnership between the two companies, which began in July 2024, provides BAPCO with additional market opportunities and trading strategies, as well as access to TotalEnergies' networks.

In September 2025, it was announced that the Sitra expansion would be commissioned in the fourth quarter of the year. The expansion will increase the plant's production of jet fuel by 90% and ultra-low sulfur diesel by 72%.

=== 2026 refinery attacks ===
In March 2026, an Iranian drone struck one of BAPCO's refineries.

The Iranian drone strikes occurred near the Gulf region's oldest oil refinery and damaged multiple residences.

The March 2026 drone attack in the Sitra area injured 32 Bahraini civilians, including four people in serious condition and children who required medical treatment.

On 5 April 2026, Bapco Energies declared that an Iranian drone attack caused a tank fire at one of its storage facilities. The fire was extinguished, and no injuries were reported.

BAPCO declared after the attack that Bahrain's domestic market needs remained fully secured and that supplies would continue without disruption under contingency plans.

== Operations ==
BAPCO is an integrated oil company operating in the field of refining, and marketing. It operates a 267,000-barrel-per-day (42,400 m^{3}/d) oil refinery which lies midway between the original BAPCO expat workers accommodation township of Awali and Sitra. The complex also includes storage facilities for 14 million barrels (2.2 million cubic metres), a marketing terminal, and a marine terminal. 95% of the company's products are for exports. BAPCO is a major exporter of diesel, jet fuel and naphtha to countries in the Middle East and Asia.

About one-sixth of this crude originates from the Bahrain Field, with the remainder being pumped from Saudi Arabia. Saudi Aramco supplies approximately 350,000 barrels per day (56,000 m^{3}/d) through the 112-kilometre (70 mi) pipeline from Aramco's Abqaiq Plant. Once the flagship Sitra refinery's expansion is completed in 2023, its capacity will be increased from 267,000 bpd to 380,000 bpd.

== History ==
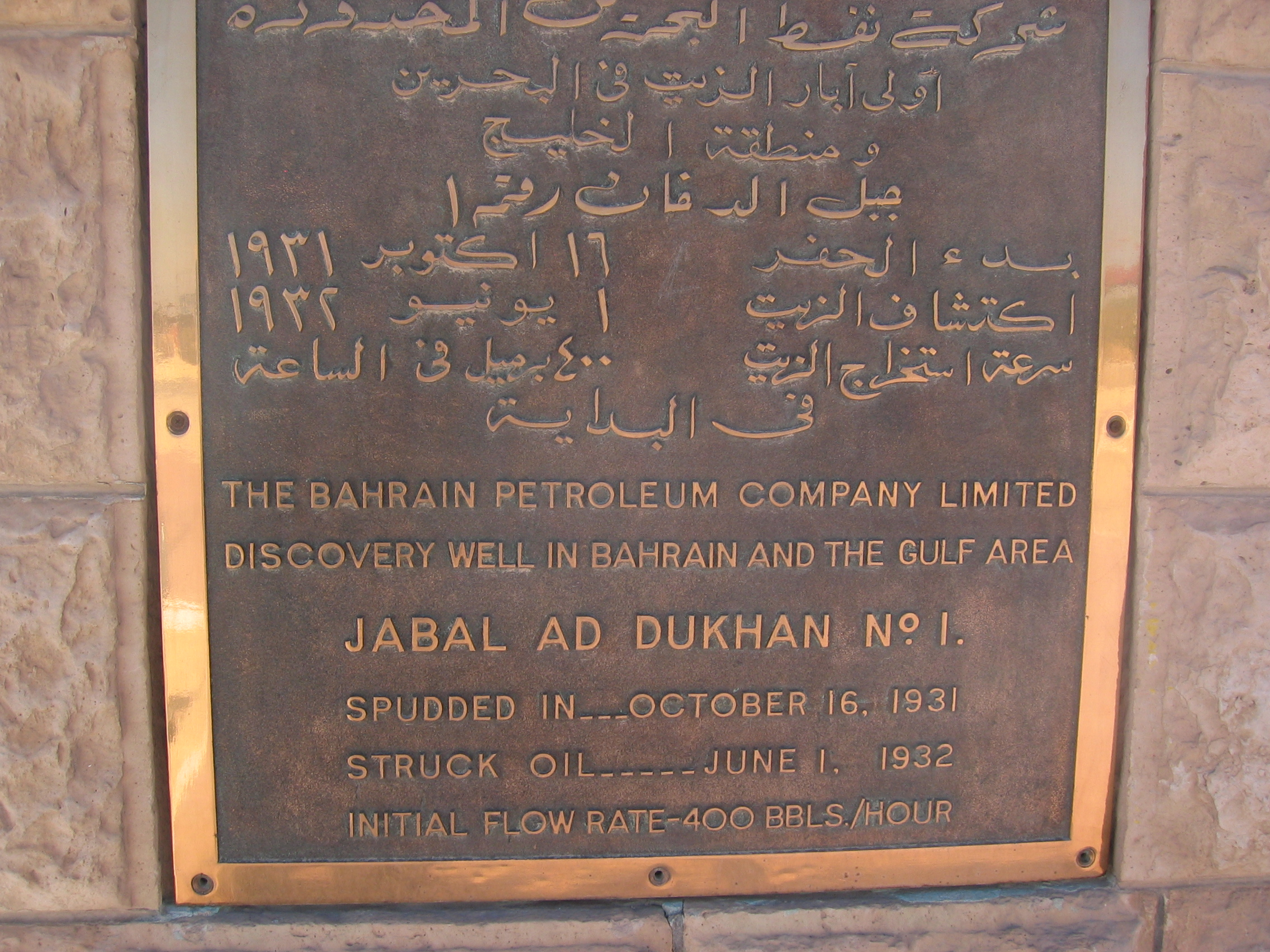
A plaque commemorating the First Oil Well

On December 2, 1925 the British Eastern and General Syndicate, headed by Frank Holmes, acquired from the Sheik of Bahrain (Isa bin Ali Al Khalifa) an oil concession over 100,000 acres with exclusive right to develop the area. Shortly thereafter the concession was extended to cover all of Bahrain. On November 30, 1927, the Eastern Gulf Oil Co. subsidiary of Gulf Oil bought an option on the concession, to be exercised before January 1, 1929.

Gulf Oil was at the time a shareholder in the Near East Development Corporation, which held a 23.75% stake in the Iraq Petroleum Company. Thus, Gulf Oil was bound by the Red Line Agreement, which stipulated that the company would not be allowed to exploit Bahrain oil without the involvement of the other members of IPC, or rather, if they did, they would bear all the downsides of exploration and still would have to share the spoils with the rest of the group. When IPC was unwilling to exercise the option jointly, Gulf Oil on December 21, 1928 sold it to the Standard Oil Company of California for $50,000, which was approximately equal to the total cost Gulf Oil had incurred for it (book value).

=== Diplomacy ===
The agreement was divided into a two-year exploration phase ("First Schedule"), covering all of Bahrein, a surface search not exceeding 20 feet of depth for signs of hydrocarbons, followed by a two-year prospecting (exploratory drilling) phase ("Second Schedule") at the end of which a mining lease over 100,000 acres (ca 51% of the area of the country) divided into no more than 3 blocks was to be awarded, followed by a 55-year mining lease period ("Third Schedule").

A considerable diplomatic back-and-forth developed during the following years in which the British government asserted its political influence when after a lack of British investment United States capital was attempting to gain access under the terms that were apparently, in the eyes of Britain, not meant to apply to foreigners.

On December 2, 1927 the exploration license was extended for one year by the Sheikh. The British Secretary of State for the Colonies Leo Amery in June 1928 instructed his political resident in the Persian Gulf to effect an alteration of the concession to include the stipulation that the lease holder had to be a company under British or British Dominion law. The Eastern and General Syndicate (EGS) sent three geologists to the island in the winter of 1927/1928, and by October 1928 had decided to attempt to get a further extension of the exploration phase and send more geologists.

When EGS could not find a British company willing to invest in the enterprise, they turned to an American company that was as member of the Iraq Petroleum Company subject to the Red Line Agreement and thus not outright able on their part to work the concession without first getting approval from the consortium. EGS had received one pessimistic prospect for oil from their first geologist, 4 optimistic prospects thereafter and were at the time planning to send geologist #1 back again to reexamine all available evidence.

Secretary Amery, acting via the Colonial Office (the conduit for all communication with EGS), then tried to get the British company clause inserted by asking EGS to try and insert it in the course of obtaining their second licence extension, to which EGS objected, because it would have alienated their option holder Gulf Oil and would have put EGS at risk of losing the concession and stranded their investment. EGS wanted the British government to lean on the Anglo-Iranian Oil Company (AIOC) or through AIOC on the Iraq Petroleum Company (IPC).

The lack of interest shown by AIOC and the Gulf Oil purchase of an option applied also to other EGS concessions that had been won: in Kuwait, Hasa province (Saudi Arabia, May 6, 1923) and the Neutral Territory between Saudi Arabia and Kuwait (May 17, 1924). It was Gulf Oil who had approached EGS after talking to an EGS geologist (T. George Madgwick) who had returned from the Middle East to the United States.

Two agreements were signed on November 30, 1927: (1) Gulf Oil's option on the Bahrein concession and (2) Gulf Oil's option on all other (Mainland) EGS concessions. EGS paid the 10,000 rupees annual royalty (Article VI) to the Bahrein state on December 2, 1928. Standard Oil of California (SOCAL), not restricted by the Red Line Agreement, had in the meantime bought the option from Gulf Oil and on January 11, 1929 had incorporated a Canadian subsidiary, the Bahrein Petroleum Company in anticipation of what would be acceptable to the British government and stood ready to begin work on the concession. In April 1929, EGS was still trying to get approval for the transfer of the concession to SOCAL from the British Colonial Office.

In an interdepartmental conference held in the Colonial Office on June 7, 1929, representatives of the British government prepared arguments to present to EGS that either their concession had lapsed (which was the result of British resistance), or that the request for an extension was (would have been) without merit. The conference then compiled a list of stipulations beneficial to the British government under which they would be willing to recommend to (allow?) the Sheikh to extend the licence. The company was to be registered in Britain, the chairman, managing director, local general manager and the whole local staff with some exceptions were to be British.

The Colonial office was delighted when in a July 19, 1929 meeting EGS did not dispute the right of the British government to impose restrictions and it was not necessary to make use of the prepared arguments. The American reply was essentially a refusal of all conditions. They opposed most strongly lack of control over local personnel in charge.

[...] (5 months of correspondence skipped over)

EGS paid the 10,000 rupee annual royalty on December 2, 1929.

[...] (9 months of correspondence skipped over)

The concession was formally assigned to the Bahrein Petroleum Company Ltd on August 1, 1930. BAPCO applied for the prospecting licence to run for two years from December 2, 1930.

The following four conditions were eventually imposed (June 12, 1930):

1. BAPCo had to be a British Company registered in Canada, but maintain an office in Great Britain run by a British citizen as a conduit for communication between the company and the British government.
2. 1/5 directors had to be a British citizen, appointed in coordination with the British government, with the salary paid by the company.
3. The company had to maintain a Chief Local Representative, approved by the British government, who would be authorized to deal with the local population, local authorities and through the British Political Agent in Bahrein with the Sheikh. Frank Holmes was appointed to the position for the first 5 years.
4. As many employees as is consistent with the efficient operation of the business had to be either British or Bahreini citizens.

=== Oil found in 1932 ===
Bahrain crude production
	Barrels
1932	902
1933	31,376
1934	285,072
1935	1,264,808
1936	4,644,635
1937	7,762,264
1938	8,298,000
1939	7,589,000
1940	7,074,000
1941	6,794,000
1942	6,241,000
1943	6,572,000
1944	6,714,000
1945	7,309,000
1946	8,010,000
1947	9,411,000
1948	10,915,000
1949	10,985,000
1950	11,016,000
1951	10,994,000
1952	11,004,000
1953	10,978,000
1954	10,992,000
1955	10,982,000
1956	11,014,000
1957	11,691,000

In June 1932 the Jebel Dukhan No. 1 well (Dukhan Hill No. 1) at the southern base of the hill struck oil at a depth of 2,008 feet and flowing at a rate of 2,400 bbl/day, in January 1933 No. 2 well, 2.5 miles north of No. 1 and drilled with the same cable tool rig, struck 33° API gravity oil at the same depth flowing at a rate of 1,500 bbl/d. A rotary drill was substituted at No. 3 well at a depth of 1,635ft in order to explore lower lying strata.

Once oil was found, the conditions were very favorable. (Note: Drilling was however particularly difficult.) All the technical equipment needed to lay a pipe and construct a loading dock from local building materials could be fitted on a single ship. The tanker El Segundo (Note: medium-sized, 3,664 gross ton tanker built in 1912) with a crew of 46 sailed from San Pedro on December 30, 1933 and arrived via Mumbai on February 22, 1934. She anchored 16,000 feet offshore beyond the stretch of shallow water that was to be bridged by a 12-inch pipeline resting on the ocean floor. (Note: From the main island to Sitra, the pipe line was installed above water. For the 12-inch loading line, no corrosion protection was provided.)

Five 8-ton anchors at the loading berth held in place 5 marking buoys at a depth of 50 feet of water. On the island of Sitra, 3 tanks totalling 250,000 barrels and one 7,500 barrel tank for ballast water (Note: The 12-inch loading line was used for both oil and ballast water) were erected from sheet steel brought by the El Segundo. (Note: According to this map, there were two 84,000bbl tanks, one 80,000bbl tank and one 8,000bbl ballast water tank.) From the terminal on Sitra to the wells, 10 miles of 6 and 8-inch gathering lines were laid. The loading capacity of the terminal was built to an initial 10,000 barrels per day. A road was built to the terminal, including 1,200 feet of a trestle (Note: built with Teakwood from India and Pine timber from California) and a draw bridge.

On June 7, 1934 the El Segundo departed with the first load of 25,000 barrels, bound for the Imperial Japanese city of Yokohama, and brought 500 barrels back for analysis to Richmond, California where she arrived on August 1. And so, Bahrain oil entered the market a few weeks before the first oil from Kirkuk.

In 1935 the decision was reached to build a 10,000 bbl/d refinery and ground was broken in October 1935 at a site on the northeast of the island opposite Sitra between the oil field and the loading dock. Before it was completed a contract was let for the second unit to double its capacity, at which point it began limited operations of those parts of the processing chain already completed. The Oil and Gas Journal published a technical description in the 1937-12-30 issue, stating the capacity as 25,000 bbl/d, but in principle already capable of more if a few bottlenecks were removed.

The official opening ceremony took place on December 11, 1937. By then, there were three 12-inch, one 10-inch and one 8-inch sea loading lines, one for each type of refined product, and 2,407,150 barrels of storage capacity of which 541,200 were for crude oil. Exports of crude petroleum fell from 4,286,000 barrels (11,742 per day) in 1937 (most of it to France, Italy, Japan) to just 336,000 barrels in 1938 and stopped entirely afterwards. Bahrein became an importer of crude oil and an exporter of refined products.

Saudi Arabian crude was delivered by barges to a new terminal at Zellaq from where it was pumped through a 6-inch pipe line to the nearest tank farm. The Dammam No. 7 well struck oil on March 3, 1938, deliveries via Zellaq began in September 1938. The last shipment was received on March 3, 1945 and with the completion of the 12-inch line to the mainland the terminal was dismantled. On occasion mainland crude was also delivered by tankers to the Sitra terminal, before and after completion of the pipe line.

On June 30, 1936 (Note: about the same time that the specs for the refinery were upgraded) the California Texas Oil Company (Caltex) was incorporated as a wholly owned subsidiary of BAPCO. The new holding company owned the shares of 5 former Texaco marketing subsidiaries which had heretofore been supplied by Texaco from production in the United States and whose assets had a book value of $27 million. These were:

- The Texas Company (Australasia) Ltd.
- The Texas Company (China) Ltd.
- The Texas Company (India) Ltd.
- The Texas Company (Philippine Islands) Ltd.
- The Texas Company (South Africa) Ltd.

In exchange Texaco was awarded a 50% stake in BAPCO.

The Italian air force bombed the refinery on October 19, 1940, but caused practically no damage except that resulting from changing allocation of military resources in the aftermath.

In 1945, a 34 mile 12-inch 62,000bpd pipeline was laid to connect the mainland's Dammam field to the refinery on Bahrein Island, whose capacity was concurrently increased to 60,000 barrels per day. The Ras Tanura refinery and associated pipeline infrastructure was built at the same time and began initial operations at 50,000bpd a little later at the end of 1945. Oil Weekly included a pretty map of all the infrastructure in the 1945-07-30 issue.

In 1953 Aramco laid 16.4 miles of underwater 12-inch loop line which increased the capacity of the link to 185,000bpd with the option of 195,000bpd (pipe pressure limit) which was planned to be reached in 1954 with some upgrades of pumping equipment. Capacity of the refinery in 1953 was 215,000bpd and Bahrein produced 30,100bpd themselves (at a remarkably steady rate).

Bahrein in the context of early Saudi Arabian oil production
Year	Production	Consumption	Runs to stills	Exports to Bahrein	To Bahrein bbl/day	Exports to others
1936	19,777	19,077	0			
1937	64,968	65,668	0			
1938	495,135	28,503	0	455,754	1,249	0
1939	3,933,903	38,821	0	2,957,955	8,104	457,758
1940	5,074,838	56,767	(Note: A separate 3,000bpd topping plant operated at Ras Tanura from 1940 till 1945)113,796	4,313,262	11,817	840,390
1941	4,310,110	23,387	393,892	4,055,790	11,112	0
1942	4,530,492	71,685	2,221	4,429,719	12,136	0
1943	4,868,184	8,817	0	4,819,674	13,205	7
1944	7,794,420	32,385	352,946	7,146,335	19,579	0
1945	21,310,996	80,876	3,451,512	15,676,815	42,950	1,206,274
1946	59,943,766	109,513	29,297,816	25,951,218	71,099	4,447,808
Total	112,346,589	535,499	33,612,183	69,806,522		6,952,237

Until June 1939 a total of 56 and until January 1, 1946 a total of 74 wells had been drilled: 62 producers, 4 observation and 8 were shut-in. In June 1953 a portable rotary rig, capable of drilling to 4,000ft and built by the National Supply Co of London sailed from London for Bahrein.

Wells completed
Year	Oil	Gas	Dry	Feet
1946	none			
1947	6	0	0	13,660
1948	none			
1949	2	0	0	4,600
1950	4	?	0	9,711
1951	6	?	2	20,430
1952
1953
1954	14	0	9	(Note: Footage partly estimated)61,360
1955	14	0	1	58,069
1956	21	0	0	51,510
1957	17	0	0	41,000
1958	2	0	1	5,535
1959	0	0	(Note: wildcat Buri No. 1 spudded in 1958 in the NW part of the island was dry at 7,675ft)1	7,675
1960	1	0	0	(Note: Footage estimated)3,000
