= Oil reserves in Saudi Arabia =

Oil reserves located in Saudi Arabia

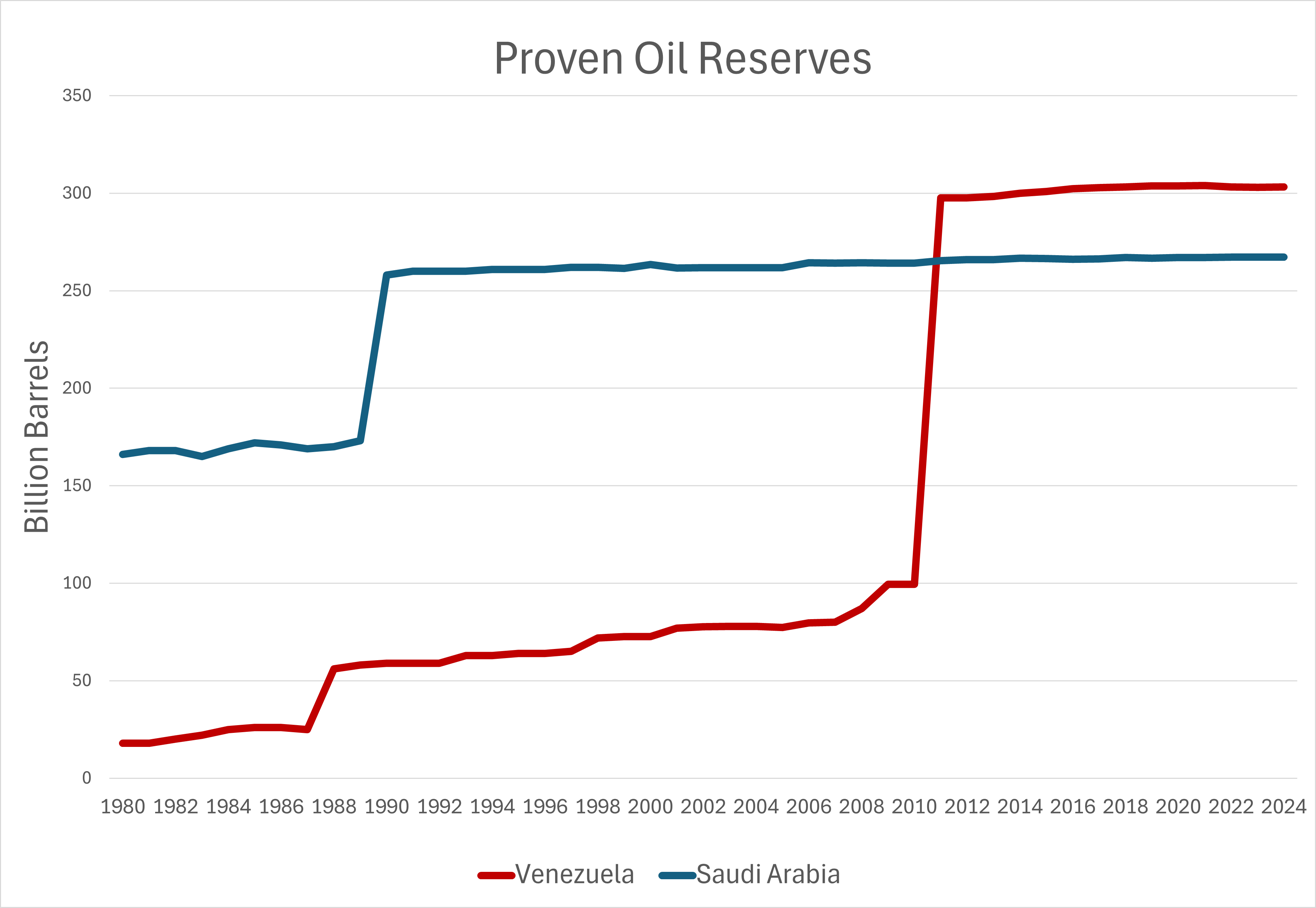
Reported proven reserves for Saudi Arabia (blue) and Venezuela (red)

The proven oil reserves in Saudi Arabia are reportedly the second largest in the world, estimated in 2017 to be 268 billion barrels (4.3×10^10 m^{3}) (Gbbl hereafter), including 2.5 Gbbl in the Saudi–Kuwaiti neutral zone. This would correspond to more than 50 years of production at current rates. In the oil industry, an oil barrel is defined as 42 US gallons, which is about 159 litres, or 35 imperial gallons. The oil reserves are predominantly found in the Eastern Province. These reserves were apparently the largest in the world until Venezuela announced they had increased their proven reserves to 297 Gbbl in January 2011. The Saudi reserves are about one-fifth of the world's total conventional oil reserves. A large fraction of these reserves comes from a small number of very large oil fields, and past production amounts to 40% of the stated reserves. Other sources state that Saudi Arabia has about 297.7 billion barrels.

In 2000, the US Geological Survey estimated that remaining undiscovered oil reserves in Saudi Arabia had a probability-weighted average of 90 Gbbl.

== Production ==
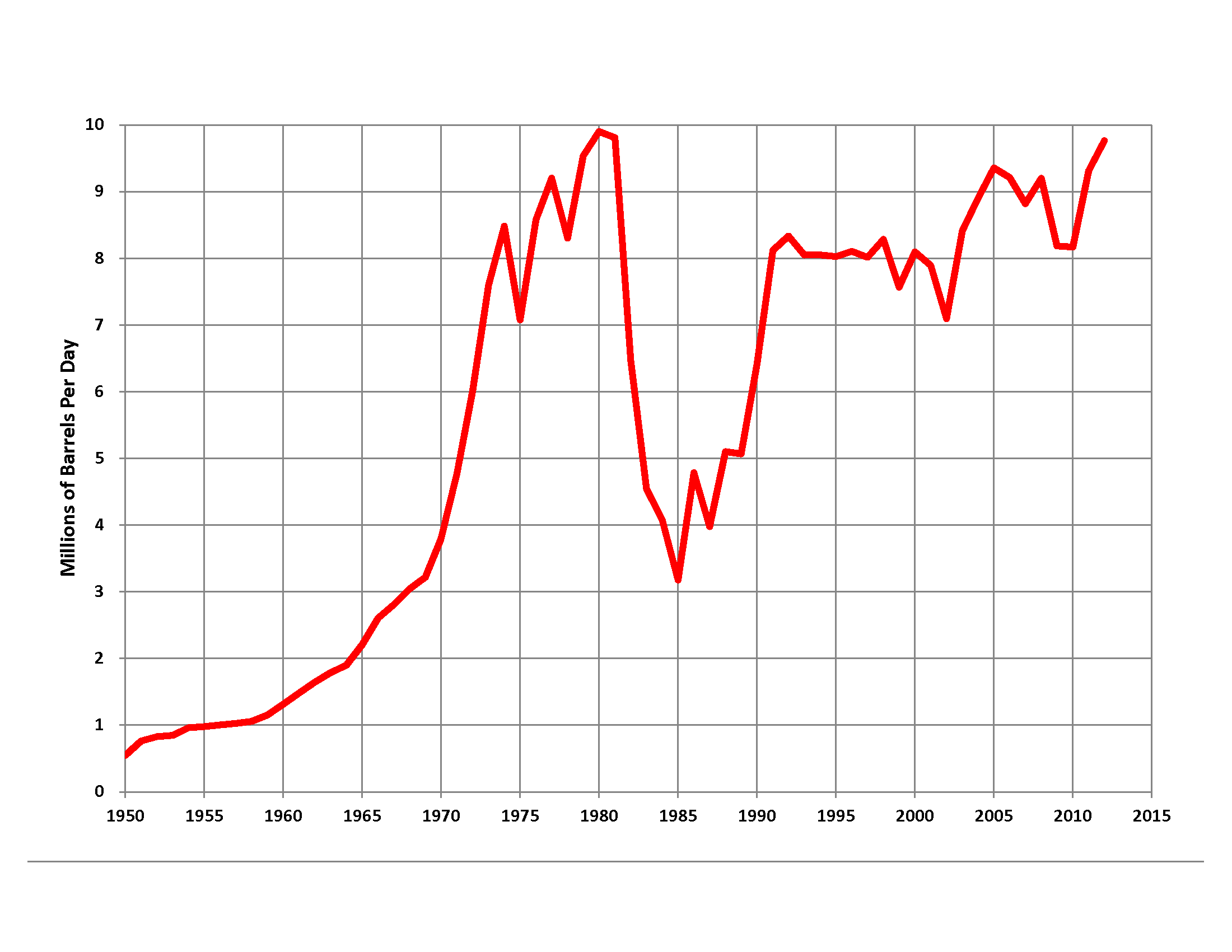
Saudi Arabia crude oil production (1950–2012)

Saudi Arabia has traditionally been regarded as the world's most important swing producer of oil. When acting as such, the Saudi government would increase or decrease oil production to maintain a more stable price.

Saudi Arabia produced 10.3 million barrels per day (1.6×10^{6} m^{3}/d) (Mbbl/d) in 1980, 10.6 Mbbl/d in 2006, and in the region of 9.2 Mbbl/d in 2008. Saudi Arabia maintains the world's largest crude oil production capacity, estimated to be approx. 11 Mbbl/d at mid-year 2008 and announced plans to increase this capacity to 12.5 Mbbl/d by 2009. Cumulative production through the end of 2009 was 119.4 billion bbl. Using the stated number of 267 Gbbl, past production amounts to 40% of the stated remaining proved reserves. By the end of 2016, Saudi Arabia cumulative oil production reached 143.97 bbl.

After the then U.S. president George W. Bush asked the Saudis to raise production on a visit to Saudi Arabia in January 2008 and they declined, Bush questioned whether they had the ability to raise production any more. In the summer of 2008, Saudi Arabia announced an increase in planned production of 500,000 barrels per day. However, in 2008, some experts believed that Saudi oil production had already peaked or would do so in the near future. In April 2015, the Saudi oil minister Ali Al-Naimi said that Saudi Arabia produced 12 million barrels per day in March that year, which was the highest figure based on records since the early 1980s. The previous peak was in August 2013 at 10.2 million barrels per day.

== Data quality ==
Historically, at least since 1982, Saudi Arabia has maintained reserves data and related technical information as a well-guarded secret. This has made independent verification of the Kingdom's reserves and resources virtually impossible, leaving various commentators and the world at-large to rely upon speculation and indirect indicators. However, a recent (2019) independent evaluation—to facilitate Saudi Arabia's effort at an initial public offering (IPO) of stock in the national Saudi Aramco oil company—may have changed that somewhat. The independent outside auditor reported that it had determined Saudi Arabia's proved oil reserves were at least 270 billion barrels, fairly consistent with Saudi claims.

In a 2004 study, Matthew Simmons analyzed 200 technical papers on Saudi reserves by the Society of Petroleum Engineers and concluded that Saudi Arabia's oil production faced near term decline, and that it would not be able to consistently produce more than 2004 levels, when production of crude oil and lease condensate averaged 9.10 million barrels per day. Simmons also argued that the Saudis may have irretrievably damaged their large oil fields by over-pumping salt water into the fields in an effort to maintain the fields' pressure and boost short-term oil extraction. He concluded (in 2004): "In 2-3 years we will have conclusive evidence that Saudi oil is peaking,"

Since his prediction, Saudi crude oil production has varied from as low as 8.25 million barrels per day (average for 2009) up to 9.83 million barrels per day (average for 2012). Overall, in the nine years since his 2004 prediction (2005-2013), Saudi crude oil and lease condensate production has averaged 9.20 million barrels per day, just slightly higher than 2004 levels.

Diplomatic cables leaked during the United States diplomatic cables leak in 2011 revealed that Dr. Sadad Ibrahim Al Husseini, former executive vice president of Saudi Arabia's oil monopoly Saudi Aramco, had warned that reports at a regional oil conference that Saudi Aramco's reserves stood at 716 billion barrels was in error because it combined unproven potential resources with proven reserves. This misunderstanding was inflating the Saudi Aramco proven reserves estimate by approximately 40% (300 billion barrels).

These skeptical viewpoints have been countered by events culminating in early 2019. In a press conference in Riyadh Saudi Arabia on January 9, 2019, Saudi Arabia Energy Minister, Khalid Al-Falih, officially announced that DeGolyer and MacNaughton had completed the first ever independent evaluation of proved reserves for the Kingdom. The results of this effort indicate that the proved reserves in the Kingdom are likely proximal to, and even somewhat larger than, previous official estimates. H.E. Khalid Al-Falih outlined the extensive effort in his remarks, stating that the process began in August 2016 and continued for almost 2 1/2 years. DeGolyer and MacNaughton personnel (more than 60 geophysicists, petrophysicists, geologists, simulation engineers, reserves engineering specialists, and economists) built the detailed independent evaluation using the extensive raw database from each of the wells and reservoirs in the evaluated reservoirs, applying their own techniques and methodologies to reach the resulting independent estimate of proved reserves. Reaction in the press to the independent evaluation was notable. For example, Ellen Wald, global energy policy analyst, told CNBC that “Whether they have 260 or 266 billion barrels isn't really the issue,” she said. “The point is that they had DeGolyer and MacNaughton, which is a very respected source, do an audit…I think it's designed to put to rest the controversy that's always plagued them since the publication of Twilight in the Desert.”

== Comparison to Venezuela ==
While Venezuela has reported "proven reserves" topping those reported by Saudi Arabia, industry analyst Robert Rapier has suggested that these numbers reflect variables driven by changes in crude oil market prices—indicating that the percentage of Venezuela's oil that qualifies as Venezuela's "proven" reserves may be driven up or down by the global market price for crude oil.

According to Rapier, Venezuela's oil reserves are largely of "extra-heavy crude oil" which might "not be economical to produce" under certain market conditions. Rapier notes that the near-quadrupling of Venezuela's claimed "proven" reserves, between 2005 and 2014—from 80 Gbbl to 300 Gbbl—may have been due to soaring crude oil prices that made Venezuela's normally uneconomical heavier crude suddenly market-viable to produce, and thus elevating it to within Venezuela's "proven" reserves. Consequently, Rapier contends, periods of lower crude oil market prices may remove those reserves from the "proven" category—placing Venezuela's viable "proven reserves" well below Saudi Arabia's.

By comparison, Rapier contends, the higher-quality crude generally associated with Saudi oil fields is cost-effective to produce under most market-price conditions, and thus is more consistently, and uniformly, part of Saudi Arabia's "proven" reserves, compared to the more variable usefulness of the Venezuelan oil.

== Gallery ==
Oil and gas field locations

Saudi Arabia production, consumption, and exports over time

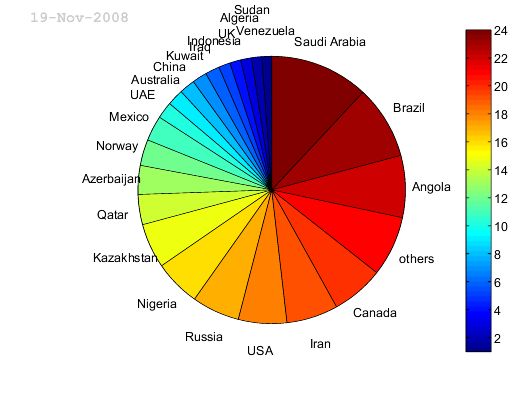
World oil reserves before the increase from Venezuela

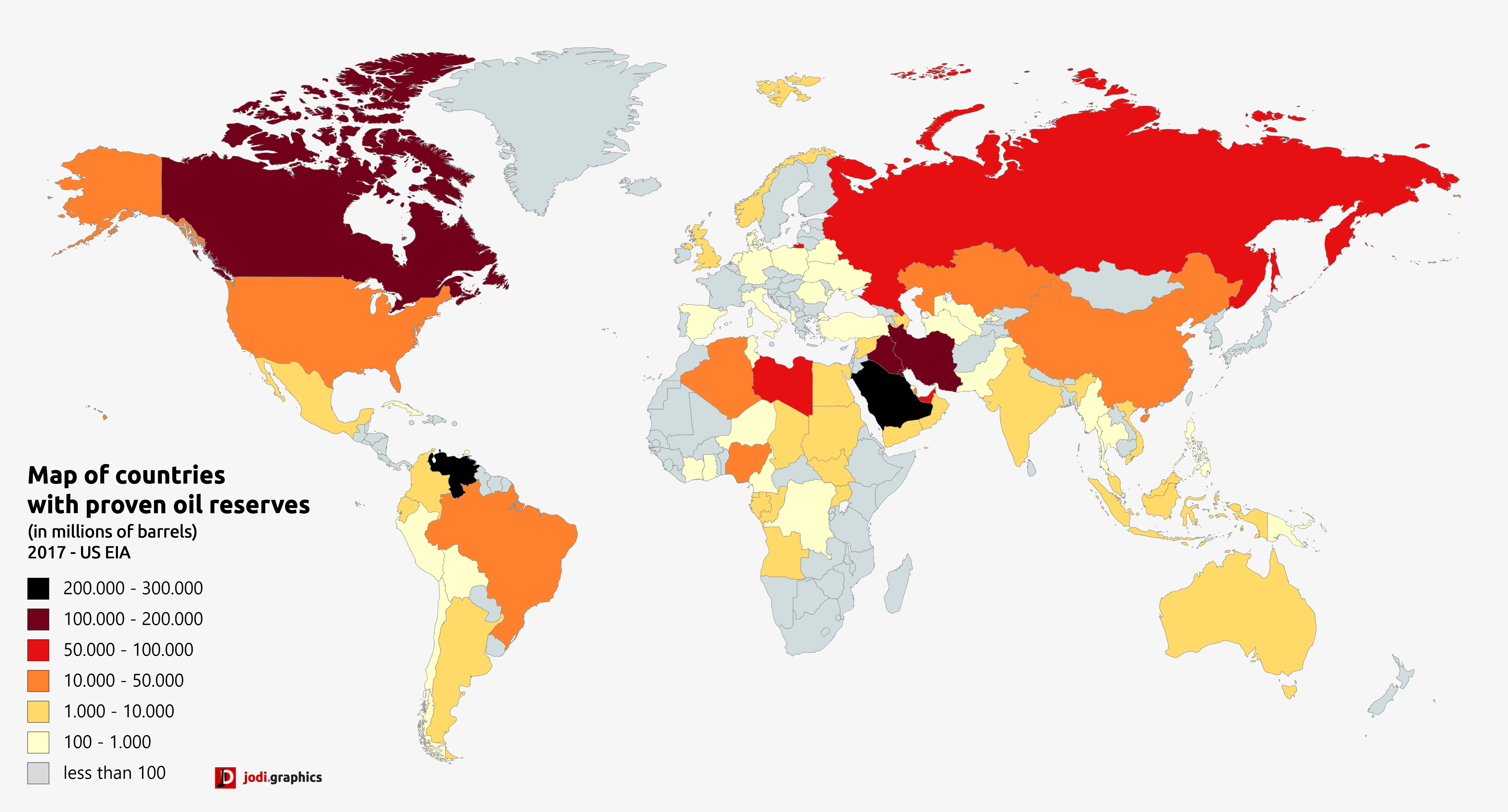
A map of world oil reserves according to U.S. EIA, 2017

== See also ==
- History of the oil industry in Saudi Arabia
- Energy in Saudi Arabia
