= Haradh =

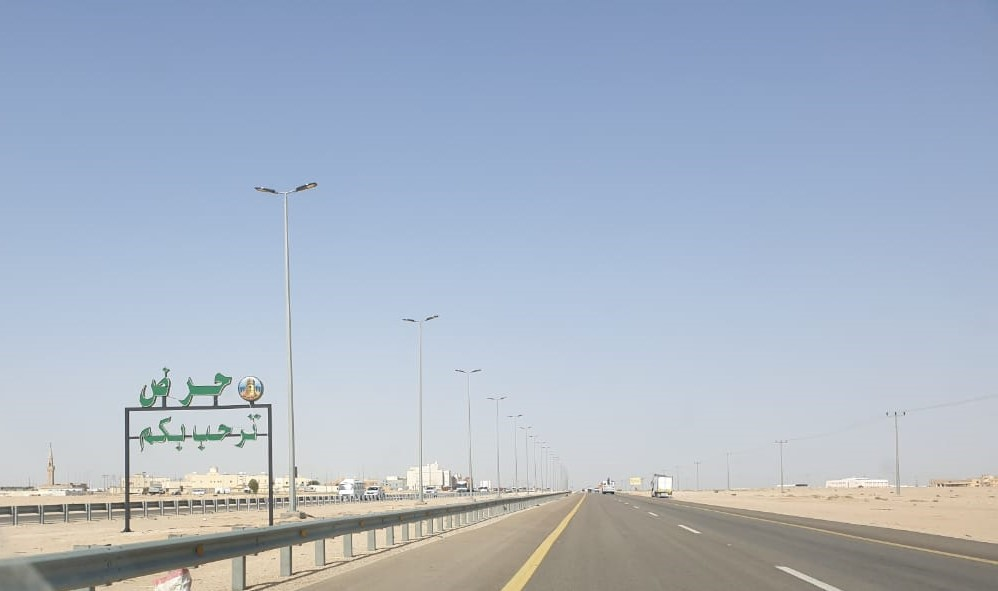

- Location in Saudi Arabia
- Coordinates: 24°8′44″N 49°3′55″E
- Country: Saudi Arabia
- Province: Eastern Province

Population (2011)
  - Total: 111,214
- Time zone: UTC+3 (Arabian Standard Time)

Haradh (Arabic: حرض, romanized: Ḥaraḍ) is a large town and industrial city in the Ahsa Governorate in the Eastern Province of Saudi Arabia, approximately 150 kilometres (93 mi) southwest of Hofuf. Due to its location above the Ghawar oil field, several oil and gas wells, along with oil refineries are located in the area, all operated by Saudi Aramco. The village is also the site of one of the largest integrated dairy farms in the world, owned and operated by the National Agricultural Development Company (NADEC).

Haradh is Habitat Sandy-gravel desert Naturally low vegetation covers the site's compact gravel, sand, and clay soils, creating a habitat for larks and wheatears, and reptiles, including the dhub.

== History ==
The initial discovery of the southern part of the Ghawar field was in 1949 at the Haradh field, where American geologist Ernie Berg mapped the surface of the Haradh anticline using the ordinary, tried-and-true plane table method.

== Haradh Gas Plant ==
Haradh is located above the massive Ghawar Field. Saudi Aramco owns and operates all oil infrastructure in the area, which produces approximately 1,000,000 barrels (159 million liters) of petroleum a day. Saudi Aramco also operates the Haradh Gas Plant Department which covers area of 8.3 km. Saudi Aramco is planning to install gas compression facilities at Haradh Saudi Arabia.Haradh Gas Plant is capable of delivering 1.5 billion cubic feet a day of sales gas to Saudi Arabia's Master Gas System and a gas oil separation plant (GOSP) capable of stabilising 300,000 barrels per day (bpd) of Arabian Light crude oil. About 87 wells feed the Haradh plant. The wells are connected to the plant via manifolds at Haradh, Wagr and Tinat. Sweet and sour gas from the wells is transported through the Haradh manifold, located 12km from plant.

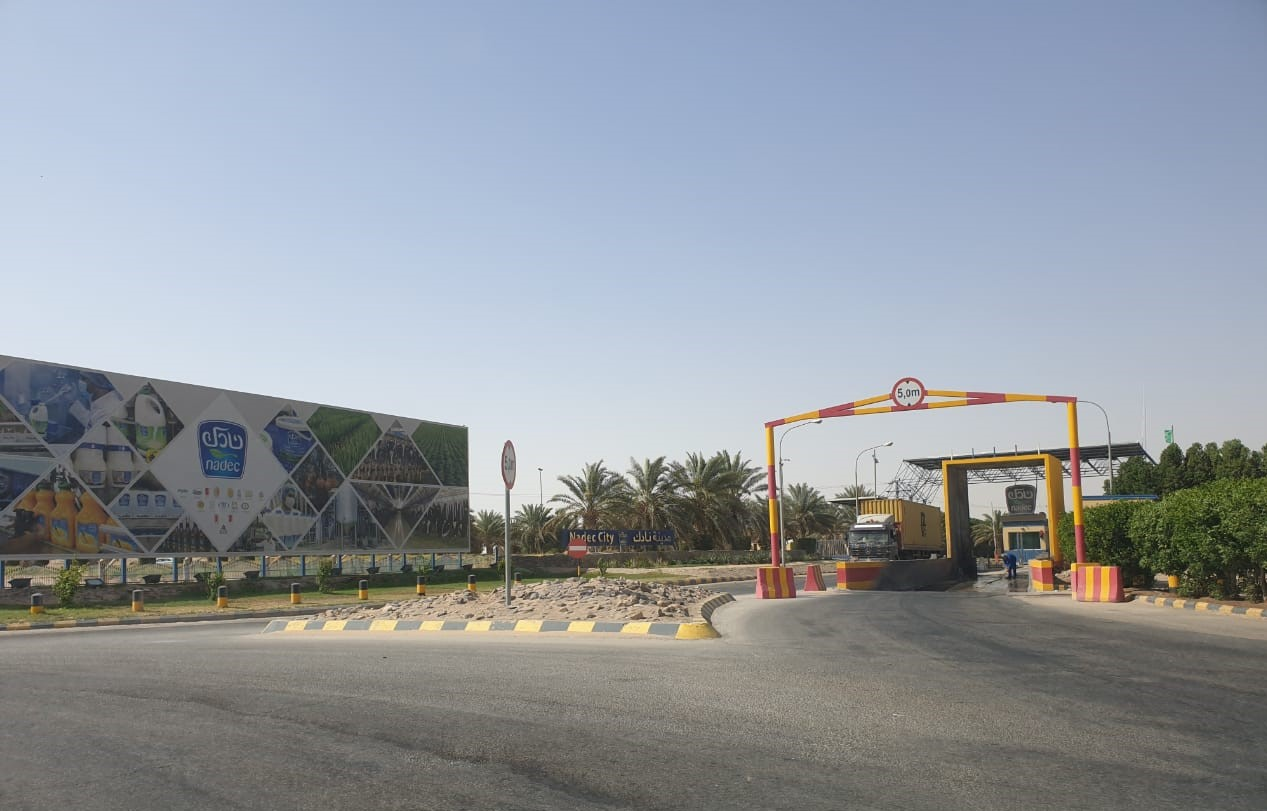
Nadec Farm Entrance gate

The integrated farm owned and operated by the National Agricultural Development Company (NADEC) in the Haradh area is one of the largest integrated dairy farms in the world.

== Transport ==
There is a small airport in Haradh for the exclusive use of Saudi Aramco offering flights for its employees to Al-Hasa and Dammam. The airport occupies an area of 1.1 km^{2} next to a residential camp and is approximately 6 km away, northeast of existing Haradh Gas Plant (HGP) facilities. The airport is equipped with one runway, 2,430 meters long and 30 meters wide. 10 parking/gates can be found there in addition to a helipad.

Haradh is well connected by road from Riyadh (290 km approximately) which may take 3 hours 16 min to reach Via Route 10 and from Al Hasa it is 174 (Km Approximately) and shall take 1 hour 50 mins to reach via route 75.
