= Ghawar Field =

Oil field in Saudi Arabia

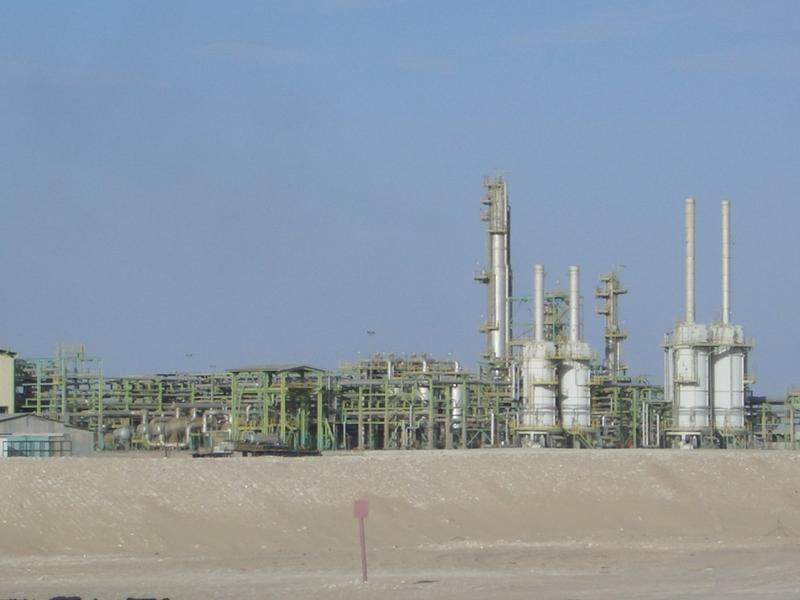
- The Ghawar Field is the largest known field in the world

- Location within Saudi Arabia
- Country: Saudi Arabia
- Region: Eastern Province
- Location: Al-Ahsa
- Offshore/onshore: Onshore
- Coordinates: 25.43°N 49.62°E (Centre approximation: 25.20°N 49.31°E)
- Operator: Saudi Aramco

Field history
- Discovery: 1948
- Start of production: 1951
- Peak year: 2005 (Contested)

Production
- Current production of oil: 3,800,000 barrels per day (~1.9×10^{8} t/a)
- Year of current production of oil: 2019
- Current production of gas: 2,000×10^{6} cu ft/d (57×10^{6} m^{3}/d)
- Estimated oil in place: 48,250 million barrels (~6.583×10^{9} t)
- Estimated gas in place: 110,000×10^{9} cu ft (3,100×10^{9} m^{3})
- Producing formations: Upper/Middle Jurassic, Upper/Lower Permian, Lower Devonian

External images
- Ghawar Field map and regional setting
- Regional cross section through Ghawar
- Total Wells at Ghawar. Blue wells are waterflood injectors, red are production wells.

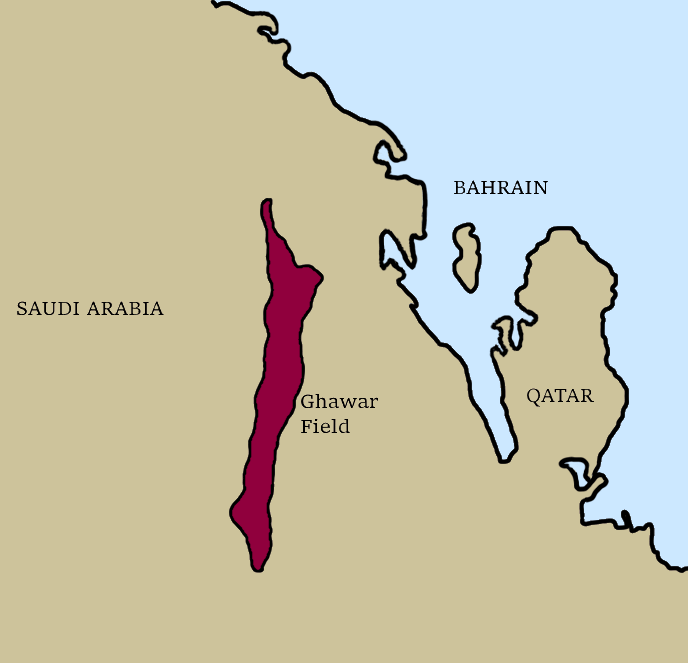
The approximate size, shape, and location of the Ghawar Oil Field

Ghawar (Arabic: الغوار) is an oil field located in Al-Ahsa Governorate, Eastern Province, Saudi Arabia. Measuring 280 by 30 km (170 by 19 mi) (some 8,400 square kilometres (3,200 sq mi)), it is by far the largest conventional oil field in the world, and accounts for roughly a third of the cumulative oil production of Saudi Arabia as of 2018.

Ghawar is entirely owned and operated by Saudi Aramco, the state-run Saudi oil company. In April 2019, the company first published its profit figures since its nationalization nearly 40 years ago in the context of issuing a bond to international markets. The bond prospectus revealed that Ghawar is able to pump a maximum of 3.8 million barrels (600,000 m^{3}) per day—well below the more than 5 million barrels (790,000 m^{3}) per day that had become conventional wisdom in the market.

== Geology ==
Ghawar occupies an anticline above a basement fault block dating to Carboniferous time, about 320 million years ago; Cretaceous tectonic activity, as the northeast margin of Africa began to impinge on southwest Asia, enhanced the structure. Reservoir rocks are Jurassic Arab-D limestones with exceptional porosity (as much as 35 % of the rock in places), which is about 280 feet (85 m) thick and occurs 6,000 to 7,000 feet (1,800 to 2,100 m) beneath the surface. Source rock is the Jurassic Hanifa formation, a marine shelf deposit of mud and lime with as much as 5 % organic material, it is estimated that 1 % to 7 % is considered good oil source rock. The seal is an evaporitic package of rocks including impermeable anhydrite.

== History ==
In the early 1940s, Max Steineke, Thomas Barger and Ernie Berg noted a bend in the Wadi Al-Sahbah dry riverbed. Measurements confirmed that the area had undergone geologic uplift, an indication that an oil reservoir may be trapped underneath. Oil was indeed found, in what turned out to be the southern reaches of Ghawar.

Historically, Ghawar has been subdivided into five production areas, from north to south: 'Ain Dar and Shedgum, 'Uthmaniyah, Hawiyah and Haradh. The major oasis of Al-Ahsa and the city of Al-Hofuf are located on Ghawar's east flank, corresponding to the 'Uthmaniyah production area. Ghawar was discovered in 1948 and put on stream in 1951. Some sources claim that Ghawar peaked in 2005, though this is denied by the field operators.

Saudi Aramco reported in mid-2008 that Ghawar had produced 48% of its proven reserves.

== Extraction of crude oil ==
Approximately 60–65% of all Saudi oil produced between 1948 and 2000, came from Ghawar. Cumulative extraction of petroleum through early 2010, has exceeded 65 billion barrels (1.03×10^{10} m^{3}). In 2009, it was estimated that Ghawar produced about 5 million barrels (790,000 m^{3}) of oil a day (6.25% of global production), a figure which was later shown to be substantially overestimated.

As of 31 December 2018, total reserves of 58.32 billion barrels (9.272×10^{9} m^{3}) of oil equivalent including 48.25 billion barrels (7.671×10^{9} m^{3}) barrels of liquid reserves have been confirmed by Saudi Aramco. Average daily extraction was 3.8 million barrels (600,000 m^{3}) per day.

Ghawar also produces approximately 2 billion cubic feet (57,000,000 m^{3}) of natural gas per day.

The operators stimulate production by waterflooding, using seawater at a rate said to be around 7 million barrels (1,100,000 m^{3}) per day. Water flooding is said to have begun in 1965. The water cut was about 32% in 2003, and ranged from about 27% to 38% from 1993 to 2003. By 2006, North Uthmaniyah's water cut was about 46%.

== Energy content ==
Taking the 1.9×10^{8} tonnes (1.9×10^{8} long tons; 2.1×10^{8} short tons) production figure per year and the conventional energy density of crude oil (per the definition of the ton of oil equivalent) of 41.868 MJ/kg (5275.3 Wh/lb)) the total thermal energy equivalent produced yearly by the oil field is roughly 7.955 EJ or 2.21 PWh of thermal energy equivalent.

For comparison,

- North Antelope Rochelle Mine, the largest coal mine in the world, produced 85.3 Mt of coal in 2019 (down from over 100 Mt in 2015) at 1.746 EJ or 485 TWh of thermal energy equivalent.
- McArthur River uranium mine, the largest uranium mine in the world, produced 7.3 Mt (16.1 Mio lb) of yellowcake in fiscal 2017, equivalent to roughly 6.2 kt of uranium metal or 4.46 EJ (1240 TWh) of thermal energy at a burnup of 200 MWh/kg achievable in CANDU-type reactors, but much less in more widespread reactor designs.
- The largest solar farm in the world, Bhadla solar park in India, covering 57 km^{2} and boasting a nameplate capacity of 2255 MW would produce 17.778 PJ or 4938 GWh of electricity per year.
- The largest wind farm as of 2021, Gansu Wind Farm in China has a nameplate capacity approaching 8 GW with plans to ramp up to 20 GW. A 20 GW power plant at 100 % capacity factor could deliver 630.7 petajoules (1.752×10^{11} kWh) of electric output per year. However, once again due to the weather-dependency and intermittency of wind power, capacity factors for onshore wind installations like Gansu are typically much lower, ranging at 15-35% depending on local factors. 250000 standard tons of coal will be replaced per year at full deployment, which is equivalent to 7327 TJ (2035 GWh).

The Ghawar oil field is thus the largest single supplier of primary energy on Earth.

== Reserves ==
In April 2010, Saad al-Tureiki, Vice-President for Operations at Aramco, stated, in a news conference reported in Saudi media, that over 65 billion barrels (10.3 km^{3}) have been produced from the field since 1951. Tureiki further stated that the total reserves of the field had originally exceeded 100 billion barrels (16 km^{3}).

The International Energy Agency in its 2008 World Energy Outlook stated that the oil production from Ghawar reached 66 Bbo in 2007, and that the remaining reserves are 74 Bbo.

Matthew Simmons, in his 2005 book Twilight in the Desert, suggested that production from the Ghawar field and Saudi Arabia may soon peak.

When appraised in the 1970s, the field was assessed to have 170 billion barrels (27 km^{3}) of original oil in place (OOIP), with about 60 billion barrels (9.5 km^{3}) recoverable (1975 Aramco estimate quoted by Matt Simmons). The second figure, at least, was understated since that production figure has already been exceeded.

== See also ==
- Udhailiyah, residential compound built atop the central part of Ghawar
- Khurais oil field
- List of oil fields
- Peak oil
- Swing producer
