= Nadec =

Food Company based in Saudi Arabia

National Agricultural Development Company (Nadec) الشركة الوطنية للتنمية الزراعية (نادك)
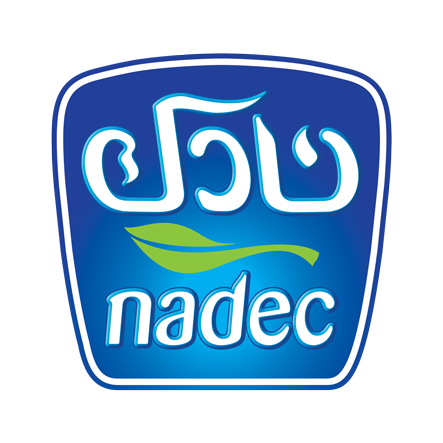
- Logo used since early 2012
- Type: Public
- ISIN: SA0007879568
- Industry: Food industry
- Predecessor: Haradh Agricultural and Animal Production Company
- Founded: August 18, 1981; 45 years ago
- Founder: Khalid bin Abdulaziz Al Saud (by royal decree)
- Headquarters: Riyadh, Saudi Arabia
- Area served: Middle East and North Africa
- Key people: Abdulaziz bin Saleh Al-Rebdi (Chairman); Solaiman Abdulaziz Altwaijri (Managing Director); Solaiman bin Abdulaziz Al-Twaijri (CEO)
- Products: Dairy products such as: cheese, labneh, leben, milk, etc.
- Revenue: 3,219,000 Saudi riyal (2024)
- Total assets: 5,673,000 Saudi riyal (2024)
- Website: nadec.com

The National Agricultural Development Company (Nadec) is one of the largest agricultural and food-processing share stock companies in the Middle East and North Africa. Established in 1981 by royal decree, it is a joint stock public company. 20% of Nadec is owned by the government of Saudi Arabia, with the rest publicly traded on the Saudi Stock Exchange. It is one of the very few and largest vertically integrated dairy businesses in the world.

Nadec has a head office located in Riyadh, Saudi Arabia and it owns six dairy farms with around 60,000 cows and two modern dairy plants with a total capacity of 1.5 million liters of milk daily.

In January 2021, Nadec has launched a restructuring program to save $32 million in a plan to improve its profit.

== Nadec Group ==
The National Agricultural Development Company (Nadec) was established by Royal Decree in 1981 in order to lessen Saudi Arabia's dependence on agricultural imports, since then it went through successive rapid development phases placing the now Nadec Group as one of the largest agri-food company in the Middle East/Africa region and the world. Nadec is a joint stock public company with 600 million Saudi Riyal equity capital. The Saudi Arabian government owns 20% of the company's shares, while the rest is publicly traded. The Nadec Group is organized into two separate business units, Nadec Foods for consumer products ad Nadec Agriculture for Agricultural produce.

== Nadec Foods ==
Today, Nadec Foods, led by its MD & Chief Executive Officer, Eng. Abdulaziz M. Al-Babtain, offers more than 200 product SKUs from fresh milk to laban, from cream to yogurt, and a wide range of fruit juices.

Nadec Foods is one of the largest vertically integrated dairy company in the world where all key activities needed to run a dairy business are managed in-house, including the milk production coming from six farms that host around 60,000 cows, two processing plants that produce over 1.5 million liters of milk per day, production of a total volume of 350 million liters, 200 trucks for primary distribution to reach the 50 depots and distributors across the Middle East and North Africa region, 800 van sales trucks with a sales force of 2,000 people to reach 35,000 retail customers and 5,000 catering clients.

== Nadec Agriculture ==
Agricultural production is one of the most important activities in the company and dovetails with the Kingdom's aim of increasing food self-sufficiency and less reliance on imports. The agricultural part of the business provides a range of different products; from onions, potatoes and fruits to olives, wheat, corn and alfalfa, as well as other nutritional animal fodder which is used to feed the dairy cows on the farms.

Fruits include peaches, apricots and plums, whereas vegetables are potatoes, onions and tomatoes. Other crops such as wheat, clover, shami corn and Rhodes grass are grown on thousands of acres of land across four major projects in Haradh, Wadi Al-Dawasser, Hail and Al Jouf.
