= Karl Twitchell =

Karl Saben Twitchell (b. 1885 - d. 1968) was an American mining engineer. Twitchell was born in St. Albans, Vermont in 1885. After graduating from St. Albans High School, he attended the Kingston School of Mines at Queens University, Kingston, Ontario, graduating in 1908.

After graduation, Twitchell worked at mines in Idaho, California, Colorado and Arizona, in positions ranging from sampler to surveyor to manager. In 1914, Twitchell began working for Colonel Steeley W. Mudd, and was sent to Cyprus to work at the Skouriatissa copper mine. When the mine closed in 1917, Twitchell worked briefly for the Cyprus Forest Department before returning to the United States at the end of World War I.

In late 1919, Twitchell was hired by the R.T. Wilson Company of New York City. Originally destined for a gold mine in Dutch Guiana, Twitchell was instead sent to Portugal to manage a tin mine. Having become engaged to Nora Gilhespie, he stopped in London to get married, in 1920, before continuing on Portugal. While working with the tin mine and subsequently two copper mines, his son Harry Gilhespie Twitchell was born in Lisbon. However, none of these operations was particularly successful—Twitchell felt that at least one of the mines had been "seeded" to attract investment—so Twitchell returned to London. This led to a meeting with Robert Annan, Chair of the Board of Consolidated Gold Fields of South Africa, who sent Twitchell on expedition to Abyssinia (now Ethiopia). Twitchell arrived in Addis Ababa in 1926, and spent six months exploring the northern half of the country. Twitchell's determination was that mineral mining was not commercially viable at that time.

En route back to London, Twitchell passed through Aden, in Yemen, where he learned of the recent visit of Charles Richard Crane. Crane had met with the Imam Yahiz, King of Yemen, and promised to find mining engineers to explore for minerals in the country. Twitchell went to New York to meet with Crane, which led to Twitchell being hired to lead an expedition in Yemen in 1928. In addition to minerals, the expedition was also intended to consider methods for improving agriculture in the country, and to search for water resources.

Twitchell worked for Charles Richard Crane, investigating water potential of Yemen. While the expedition found little in the way of commercial mining opportunities, Twitchell did conduct agricultural experiments and convinced the King to begin construction of a road system in the country. The expedition lasted six months,, and was followed by a second expedition of similar length in 1929, and a third trip in 1931, during which Twitchell oversaw construction of a major bridge.

In 1932, Crane was invited by King Ibn Saud to come to Saudi Arabia. The King was aware of the work in Yemen, and interested in replicating it in his country, especially the efforts to locate water supplies. Crane then employed Twitchell to investigate the water prospects in Ibn Saud's Saudi Arabia. Twitchell arrived with his wife in Jedda in mid-1932. After a grand meeting and feast with Ibn Saud, Twitchell set out to explore the Hejaz area in search of water. Despite traveling some 1300 miles within this region, in April 1933, Twitchell determined no prospects for an artesian aquifer existed beneath the desert. However, he had noticed evidence of ancient Roman and Israelite mines, which suggested to him that there was potential for mining gold and possibly even finding oil. Saudi Arabia's finance minister, Sheik Abdulla Suliman Al Hamdan, grasped the implications of the oil possibilities, and sent Twitchell back out to travel eastward towards the Persian Gulf. In the course of this exploration, Twitchell became the first American to cross Saudi Arabia.

Returning to the Saudi capital of Riyadh, Twitchell again met with Ibn Saud, who asked him to continue investigating the oil possibilities. This included a trip to Bahrain, where oil drilling was already in progress. Subsequently, Twitchell advised Ibn Saud to delay initiating any oil operations in Saudi Arabia until the venture in Bahrain, which was still in its early stages, produced significant results. In the meantime, Twitchell resumed exploration of the ancient gold mines. Ibn Saud preferred to work only with American investors, but Twitchell was unable to interest any American companies in the gold mining. However, while in the United States trying to line up investors for the gold exploration, Twitchell met with representatives of The Texas Company (now Texaco) and Standard Oil Company. After reviewing Twitchell's geological notes, the Standard Oil Company of California (SOCAL) retained Twitchell as a negotiator, and on 29 May 1933, SOCAL received such a concession. The exploration rights covered an area of approximately 360,000 square miles (930.000 square kilometers), and the agreement was for sixty years. An initial advance on royalties, in the form 35,000 gold sovereigns, was shipped by SOCAL to the Saudi government in July 1933, at which point Twitchell terminated his contract with the oil company and went back working on the gold mines.

Twitchell was able to form a syndicate backed by English, American and Canadian investors, and Twitchell returned to Jedda in July 1934 to negotiate a concession. The process proved more complicated than he had anticipated, but an agreement was finally reached on Christmas Eve. The timing was fortuitous, as gold prices were soon raised to $35 per ounce. The area controlled by the syndicate proved to have approximately 450,000 tons of gold tailings. While the syndicate had to build virtually the entire mining and processing infrastructure, building everything from mills to roads to a shipping pier in Jedda, the project was successful. By the time the tailings were worked out in 1954, approximately $32 million worth of gold, silver and copper had been produced. This time frame included the entirety of World War II, which complicated matters considerably. Replacing equipment during the massive war equipment-building effort was extremely difficult, but Twitchell convinced the U.S. Department of State that closing the mine during the war would be viewed very negatively by the Saudi government, potentially even driving the Saudis to align with Germany, and the State Department continued authorizing the equipment until the last nine months of the war. Twitchell also served as chief of the first U.S. Agricultural Mission to Saudi Arabia, at the request of King Ibn Saud.

After World War II, Twitchell was involved in developing the "Seven Years Plan" in Iran and also in a diamond and gold mining operating in British Guiana. He joined the boards of directors of the Rock of Ages Corporation, a granite quarrying company based in Barre, Vermont, and also the American Eastern Corporation. He wrote a book simply titled "Saudi Arabia", published by Princeton University Press; it went through three editions and was considered a definitive description of the country for several decades. In 1955, his novel, "Keith Arnold in Mining Engineering", co-authored with Robert Wyndham, was published by Dodd, Mead and Company. Twitchell was also a long-time member of the Explorers Club and the Mining Club.

Twitchell and his wife moved to Byram, Connecticut in 1949. He died at his home on January 7, 1968. Many of his papers, photographs and collected items were donated to the Harvard Semitic Museum; more of his legacy is in the possession of Princeton University and Middlebury College, from which he received an honorary Doctor of Science degree on June 12, 1950.
