= Thomas Barger =

American geologist (1909–1986)

Thomas C. Barger
- Born: 30 August 1909; Minneapolis, Minnesota, U.S
- Died: 30 June 1986 (aged 76–77); San Diego, U.S
- Education: University of North Dakota
- Scientific career
- Fields: geology

Thomas Barger (1909 – 1986) was an American geologist, explorer, miner, businessman and former CEO of the Arabian American Oil Company (formerly Aramco now Saudi Aramco).

== Biography ==
Thomas Barger was born in Minneapolis, Minnesota, in 1909 to Mary Barger and Michael Thomas Barger.

He grew up in Linton, North Dakota, and graduated from the University of North Dakota's College of Engineering in Grand Forks, North Dakota, with a degree in mining and metallurgy in 1931.

After college he worked as a surveyor and miner in Canada, an engineer, assayer, and assistant manager of a silver and radium mine in the Northwest Territories and as an assistant professor of mining at the University of North Dakota.

He accepted a position at the Anaconda Copper Mining Company but the Great Depression and falling copper prices resulted in his being forced to find work elsewhere.

In 1937 Barger interviewed with J.O. Nomland, the chief geologist at the Standard Oil Company of California, in San Francisco and accepted a job as a surveyor in Saudi Arabia.

He married Kathleen Elizabeth Ray on November 18, 1937, shortly before heading off to Saudi Arabia by himself for what ended up being three years exploring potential oil sites in the Saudi Arabian desert.

He worked alongside Ernie Berg under the American geologist Max Steineke, who used a group of Bedouin trackers headed by Khamis bin Rimthan. Together, they discovered the Ghawar Field.

After the men discovered Saudi Arabia's vast oil fields Barger began a career with Aramco that would last 32 years. He started as a surveyor and geologist then worked as the director of Local Government Relations, was the company representative to the Saudi government and was the manager for Concession Affairs.

Fluent in Arabic, Barger was a key element in the company's relationship with the Saudi government and people.

He ensured that the goal of the company was to be mutually beneficial, training and employing thousands of Saudis and eventually becoming a Saudi run and owned entity (which it is today).

In 1957 Barger became a vice president and assistant to President Norman Hardy. In 1959 Barger became president of Aramco and in 1961 he was appointed the company's Chief Executive Officer.

Kathleen and Thomas lived in Dhahran and had six children. Barger retired from the company in 1969.

Thomas Barger died of Parkinson's disease June 30, 1986, in San Diego at the age of 77.

== See also ==
- Discovery! The Search for Arabian Oil
- Max Steineke
- Saudi Aramco
