= George Martin Lees =

British geologist

- Born: 16 April 1898; Dundalk, Ireland
- Died: 5 January 1955 (aged 56)
- Education: Royal Military Academy, Woolwich; Royal School of Mines; St. Andrew's College
- Known for: mapping of oil fields in the middle east and Britain
- Spouse: Hilda Frances Andrews
- Awards: Bigsby Medal (1943); Sidney Powers Memorial Award (1954); Fellow of the Royal Society
- Scientific career
- Fields: Geology

George Martin Lees MC DFC FRS (16 April 1898 – 5 January 1955) was a British soldier, geologist and leading authority on the geology of the Middle East.

== Early life and military service ==
Lees was born on 16 April 1898 at Dundalk to George Murray Lees, a Scottish civil engineer, and his wife Mary Martin. From 1906 he was educated at St. Andrew's College before moving to the Royal Military Academy, Woolwich in 1915 to train for the First World War. He gained a commission in the Royal Artillery, serving in France, and from there transferred to the Royal Flying Corps, where he won the Military Cross. He spent some time in Egypt and Mesopotamia (now Iraq), winning the Distinguished Flying Cross, and after being shot down behind Turkish lines at Kirkuk, abandoning his plane and taking to the hills which he followed by moonlight for 30 miles (48 km) back to Kirkuk. After the end of the war Lees served as an Assistant Political Officer at Halabja in Southern Kurdistan, which had been established as a buffer state between Persians and Arabs under British control to prevent future wars. In the summer of 1919 Lees acted as an advisor to the local ruler, Sheikh Mahmoud, who betrayed the British and attempted to set up his own kingdom; Lees was besieged in his house by hundreds of armed men, and only escaped through trickery. He had to beat a hasty retreat on horseback to Khanaquin. When he returned to the area in 1930, he drank tea with the local headman who claimed he had his "fingers on the trigger" when Lees had ridden past 10 years before.

== Geological work ==
=== Persia ===
Lees returned to England in 1921, and handed in his resignation. Following studies at the Royal School of Mines, he joined the Anglo-Persian Oil Company as an Assistant Geologist, despite having no formal qualifications, and returned to the Middle East in 1922. In 1924 he and the geologist Hugo De Böckh toured south-west Persia, identifying several productive oil fields. On one occasion, Lees went to swim across the Karun river and was swept away. The other geologists returned to camp. "Ah, Lees is gone," they said. As they were about to organise a funeral party, Lees turned up. His cork hat, which he used to keep himself afloat by filling it with air and keeping it under the water, had saved him. In this way, it was said, a single hat changed the destiny of Anglo Persian and its successor, BP. De Böckh and Lees later published the theoretical side of their work in the paper The Structure of Asia, edited by J. W. Gregory and presented to the British Association in 1928.

=== Oman ===
From 1925 to 1926 Lees surveyed Oman with K. Washington Gray, the resulting papers (given to the Geological Society of London and the Royal Geographical Society) remained standard works for the region until at least the 1950s. Lees (1928) addressed the intriguing question of how remnants of oceanic crust, known as the Semail Ophiolite, came to occur all around the Hajar Mountains of Oman. He proposed a huge thrust sheet, the Semail Nappe, based on his observations in the Oman Mountains, and on his knowledge of the Alps and of the Zagros. Lee's theory was remarkably far-sighted and, as evidence of plate tectonics grew, a development of his theory emerged. This postulated that, as the continents moved together, a slab of ocean crust from the ancient Tethys Ocean had been pushed over the continental margin for hundreds of kilometres about 87-76 million years ago. However, Hugh Wilson, a leading proponent of the 'in-situ' theory that these igneous rocks had essentially flowed into position, observed that the major displacement surfaces were not prominent in the field and that he had seen more evidence of extension than compression in the Oman Mountains. Glennie (2001) remains a spirited critique of most of Wilson's arguments. Almost all later authors interpret the Semail Ophiolite as thrust, or obducted, probably due to a short period of subduction close to the margin of the Arabian Plate.

=== Bahrain ===
Immediately following his Oman expedition, in early 1926, Lees was posted to Bahrain. While accepting that there were oil prospects in Cretaceous or older rocks, he gave it a distinctly low rating in comparison with the numerous Asmari Limestone prospects available in the region generally, most of them in Persia or Iraq. Lees' views at that time were greatly influenced by De Böckh, who considered Bahrain unlikely to yield oil in comparable quantity with structures in the Zagros foothills and had doubts whether any important amount would be found where the Asmari Limestone is missing (which it was in Bahrain). Lister James, who had been favourably impressed with Bahrain several years earlier, was still chief geologist for Anglo-Persian but De Böckh had been retained as the company's chief geological adviser for several years, and his opinion, supplemented by the report of Lees, prevailed with the management. At a lecture he delivered a few months before the discovery of oil in Bahrain, Lees summed up the evidence for and against finding oil in commercial quantities in Bahrain as an even chance. Lees came down on the side of the doubters, famously declaring that he would "drink any commercial oil found in Bahrain".

=== Qatar ===
After his assignment to Bahrain, Lees proceeded to Qatar to fend off the interest of Major Frank Holmes who had approached the sheikh for an oil concession. Lees visited Doha and made a one-day trip to a few outcrops of Qatar, which he rightly identified as Eocene limestone exposed on the crest of a gently-dipping anticline. Before leaving, Lees also obtained permission from the sheikh to explore the sheikhdom for the following two years. He did not visit the most promising oil prospect, Jebel Dukhan, and his prediction of finding oil was generally pessimistic, although he qualified this with the statement that "if…Bahrain be drilled and proved successful, similar conditions may apply at Qatar." The concession was allowed to lapse but, when oil was indeed stuck on Bahrain in 1933, Anglo-Persian began serious negotiations for an oil concession for Qatar, which they obtained in 1935. Then, on account of the Red Line Agreement, the company transferred the concession to the Qatar Petroleum Company, an associate company of the Iraq Petroleum Company.

=== Appointment as Chief Geologist, Anglo-Persian Oil Company ===
From 1928 to 1930, Lees examined the company organisation and oil prospects in Germany, Canada, Egypt and the United States, as well as surveying fields in Kermanshah and Iraqi Kurdistan. On 1 November 1930, at the age of 32, he was appointed Chief Geologist of the Anglo-Persian Oil Company. During the 1930s, although the international spread of exploration was reduced, he was responsible for mapping the company's entire concessionary area and selecting the most promising 100,000 square miles (260,000 km^{2}) in accordance with the concession agreement of 1933. It was the earliest comprehensive survey of Persia, and the foundation of all subsequent knowledge. One aspect of this work was the increasing use of geophysicists, which Lees welcomed, but it caused some friction between traditional geologists and modern geophysicists.

=== United Kingdom ===
In the late 1930s Lees initiated the search for oil in the United Kingdom. Although his efforts were not rewarded by conspicuous commercial results during his lifetime, limited success was achieved at Eakring in Nottinghamshire where the first British oilfield provided useful supplies during World War II. This work also helped to discover new coal fields.

=== World War II ===
During the war, Lees was seconded to the Petroleum Division of the Ministry of Fuel and Power. He accompanied the American geologist Everette Lee DeGolyer to Persia in 1944 when De Golyer was assessing the reserves of the Middle East. De Golyer made the memorable prediction that the centre of gravity of world oil production was shifting from the Gulf Caribbean area to the Middle East.

== Awards and achievements ==
For his exploration work in Britain and the Middle East, Lees was awarded the Bigsby Medal in 1943, and was made a Fellow of the Royal Society in 1948. From 1951 to 1952 he served as president of the Geological Society of London, the first industrial geologist to be so honoured. In 1951, he addressed the World Petroleum Congress on the oilfields of the Middle East, giving one of the earliest lectures illustrated with slides. In 1954, he received the Sidney Powers Memorial Medal from the American Association of Petroleum Geologists, the highest American geological medal, never before conferred on a non-American.

In the Second Presidential Address to members of the Geological Society in 1953, Lees described his vision of the wonders of geology: "I have sat in contemplation on the Kerry rocks of south-western Ireland and seen the great Hercynian ranges warping downwards through a magnificent fiord phase of drowned valleys into the water of the Atlantic; I have observed with awe and wonder the inspiring view of the Armorican ranges confidently striking into the turbulent Atlantic at the Point du Raz, Finistère, and I have seen the great Atlas Mountains with their component subdivisions heading strongly seaward; I have seen the Arabian and Indian coasts, made a complete circuit of Australia and traversed the Pacific; I have seen the Californian edge of the American continent and the great drowned valleys of the British Columbian coasts; I have seen the bevelled stumps of the one time mountains of Nova Scotia striking freely into the Atlantic and I have traversed the eastern seaboard of the United States to the point of Florida and the Antilles loop to Trinidad and into Venezuela."

== Personal ==
Martin Lees married Hilda Andrews in London in 1931: the marriage produced one recorded son, born in 1933.

== Retirement and death ==
Lees' health suffered with the demands of all his activities, and he retired to Essex in 1953. Although he had apparently recovered, he died in London on 25 January 1955.
