= Dammam No. 7 =

First commercial oil well in Saudi Arabia

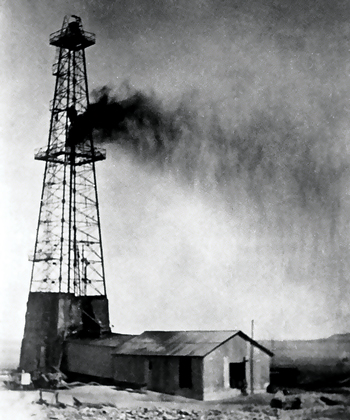
- Country: Saudi Arabia
- Region: Eastern Province
- Location: Dhahran (Dammam metropolitan area)
- Coordinates: 26°19′15.95″N 50°7′39.94″E
- Operator: Saudi Aramco

Field history
- Discovery: 1938
- Start of development: 1946
- Start of production: 1949
- Abandonment: 1982

Production
- Peak of production (oil): 1,600 barrels per day (~80,000 t/a)

Dammam No. 7, also known as "Prosperity Well", is an oil well located in Dammam, Saudi Arabia, notable for being the site where commercial quantities of oil were first discovered in the country on March 3, 1938. This discovery marked the beginning of Saudi Arabia's transformation into one of the world's leading oil producers. The well, which operated continuously until its closure in 1982, is now a historic landmark and part of an Aramco museum.

== Discovery and early development ==
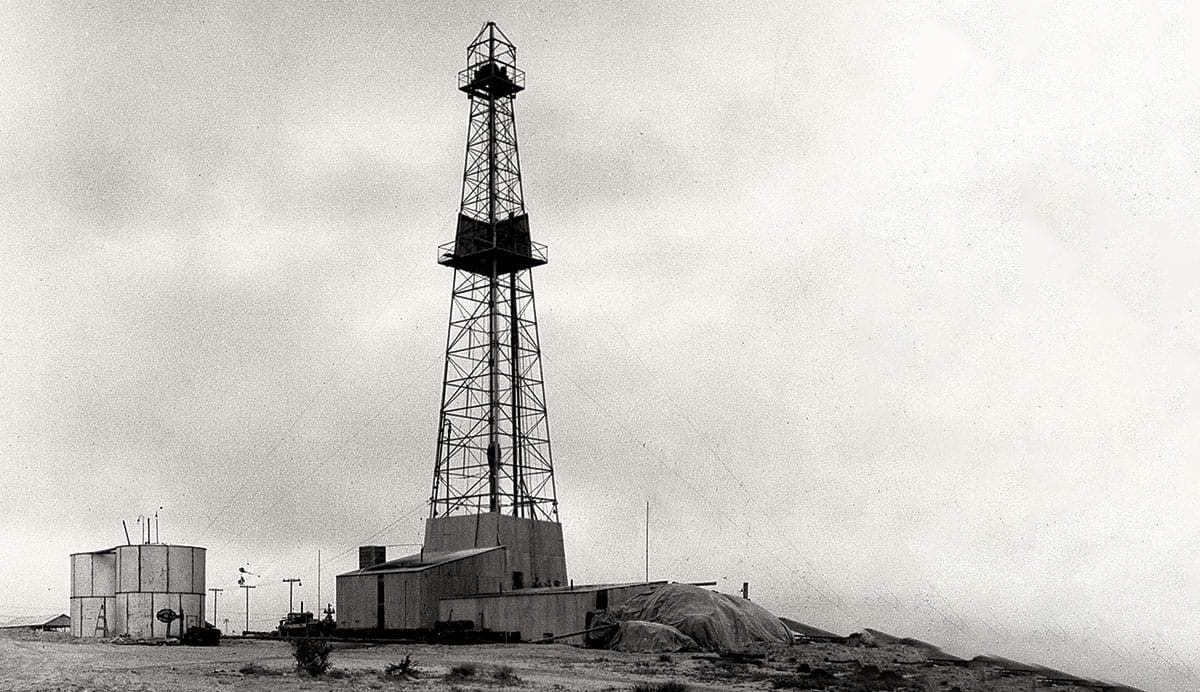
The well in 1938

When drilling commenced in the 1930s, the existence of oil in Saudi Arabia was uncertain. The discovery of oil in neighboring Bahrain in 1932, however, spurred Saudi Arabia to initiate its own oil exploration efforts.

The California Arabian Standard Oil Company (CASOC), later known as Saudi Aramco, had secured a concession agreement with the Saudi government in 1933, and began drilling in Dammam in the Eastern Province. Prior to this, the region consisted of small fishing villages. CASOC faced immense logistical challenges, requiring the construction of infrastructure from scratch. Drilling continued at Dammam No. 7 despite initial setbacks with the first six wells (Dammam No. 1–6), which failed to yield significant commercial quantities of oil. By November 1937, all other drilling operations in the kingdom were halted, and efforts were concentrated on this well, which had already reached twice the depth of the "Bahrain Zone", where oil had been discovered in Bahrain.

=== Oil discovery ===
In a project led by American geologist Max Steineke and assisted by Saudi Bedouin Khamis Bin Rimthan, the two men persisted to drill deeper in the well. On March 3, 1938, commercial volumes of oil began gushing out of the well at a depth of approximately 1,440 m (4,720 ft). On that day, 1,585 barrels of oil were extracted from the well, and six days later this daily output had increased to 3,810 barrels. By October 1938, the Dammam field was confirmed as a viable commercial oil source. The discovery validated the persistence of chief geologist Max Steineke, who advocated drilling deeper despite earlier setbacks.

== Production volume ==
From 1938 until its closure in 1982, the well produced more than 32 million barrels of oil with a daily average of 1,600 barrels.

== Legacy and cultural impact ==
Crown Prince Abdullah officially named Dammam No. 7 the 'Prosperity Well' in 1999. In 2021, Saudi Aramco built a supercomputer called Dammam 7, named after the well; it is ranked the tenth-most powerful supercomputer in the world. In August 2023, it was announced that an upcoming film titled Sands of Fortune would feature the story of Dammam No. 7 while chronicling the early history of the Saudi oil industry. In the present day, the oil well still stands and is integrated into an Aramco museum, where visitors frequently have their photographs taken in front of the historic landmark.

== See also ==
- History of the oil industry in Saudi Arabia
