= Max Steineke =

American petroleum geologist (1898–1952)

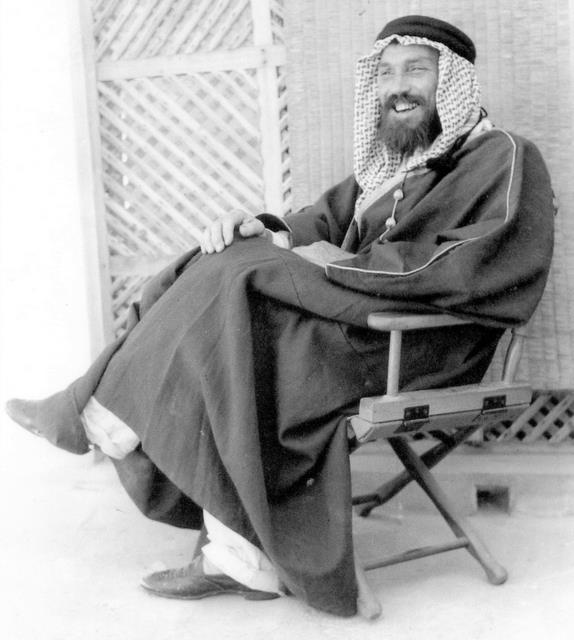
- Saudi Arabia, 1938
- Born: March 1898; Brookings, Oregon, U.S.
- Died: April 1952 (aged 54); Los Altos, California, U.S.
- Education: Stanford University
- Scientific career
- Fields: Geology
- Workplaces: California-Arabian Standard Oil Co. (CASOC)

Max Steineke (1898 – 1952) was a prominent American petroleum geologist. He was chief geologist at California-Arabian Standard Oil Co. (CASOC) from 1936 until 1950 (by which time CASOC had become Aramco). His efforts, and persistence through repeated setbacks, led to the first discovery of oil in commercial quantities in Saudi Arabia, which took place at the well known as "Dammam No. 7" in March 1938. He graduated from Stanford University in 1921 with an AB degree in geology.

== Early life ==
Steineke spent his early years on a homestead near Brookings, Oregon, one of nine children of German immigrants. At the age of twelve, he left home for nearby Crescent City, California, where he found employment at a lumber mill. A school teacher with whom he boarded took an interest in him, and encouraged his further education.

In 1917 he entered Stanford University (at that time no entrance examination was required). He graduated in 1921 with an AB in geology. In the years between graduation and the beginning of his work in Saudi Arabia, he explored for oil in California, Alaska, Canada, Colombia, and New Zealand.

== Discovery of oil in Saudi Arabia ==
On May 29, 1933, an oil concession agreement was signed between Saudi Arabia and Standard Oil of California (SoCal), and on November 8, SoCal formed a subsidiary, the California-Arabian Standard Oil Company (CASOC) to manage the concession. The geological formation known as "Dammam Dome" was the first target of exploration, initially investigated by Schuyler B. Henry and J.W. Hoover in 1933. The first of a series of test wells was drilled into the formation in 1935.

Steineke had arrived for the first time in Saudi Arabia in 1934, and was appointed chief geologist of CASOC in 1936. In 1937 he made a round trip of geological reconnaissance across the Saudi Arabian peninsula with a small party of other geologists.

Meanwhile, a series of test wells had been drilled at Dammam. Through 1936 none of the wells had demonstrated the presence of oil in commercial quantities. In December 1936, a "deep test", No. 7, was begun at the urging of Steineke, who wished to test the deeper porous limestone "Arab Zone" underlying impervious anhydrite. All through 1937, No. 7 experienced a series of expensive accidents and delays, and SoCal management became increasingly impatient. The Arabian venture was costing a lot of money, and so far there wasn't much encouragement.

In early 1938, Steineke was called back to San Francisco. SoCal had reportedly decided to "pull the plug" on Saudi Arabian exploration. Steineke, now the chief geologist of the venture, convinced his managers to at least wait for the results from Dammam #7, which was still drilling at a slow pace. During the first week of March 1938, at a depth of 1440 meters, Dammam No. 7 started producing at commercial quantities, reaching more than 3000 barrels per day by the end of the month. The success at No. 7 quickly led to further positive results, and by 1940, the Dammam field was producing more than 12,000 barrels per day. Later, King Abdulaziz named Well No. 7 the Prosperity Well.

Steineke had found clues to oil at a site 30 miles from Dammam, where, in November 1940, the first well flowed at nearly 10,000 barrels per day. What Steineke had discovered was the huge Abqaiq field.

Steineke developed the structural drilling technique, a method of drilling shallow holes in order to discover and map the underlying rock formations. It was widely used in later exploration for oil in Saudi Arabia, and cited when he received the Powers Award of the American Association of Petroleum Geologists: "The methods he [Steineke] developed in the area probably resulted in the discovery of greater reserves than any other geologist." The method was instrumental in the discovery of the most productive oil field ever found: Ghawar.

Steineke continued to work in Saudi Arabia during World War II. During that period CASOC's role was to produce oil for the allies, and protect the oil fields from enemy occupation. He continued as Aramco's chief geologist until 1950, when his health began to deteriorate.

Steineke died in Los Altos, California, in April, 1952, at age 54.

== Awards and honors ==
The Sidney Powers Memorial Award, American Association of Petroleum Geologists, 1951.

The Bedouin trackers led by Khamis ibn Rimthan, renamed a Um Ruqaibah jebel as Usba Steineke, Finger of Steineke. As Thomas Barger wrote, "...Max was much the same as Khamis...Figuratively as well as literally, they both seemed to know where they were and where they were going next."

Steineke Hall, a guest house in the Saudi Aramco Residential Camp in Dhahran, was named in honor of Max Steineke.

Max Steineke Endowed Professorship in the School of Earth Sciences at Stanford University.

== See also ==
- Thomas Barger
- Saudi Arabian oil
