= List of power stations in Bahrain =

Location of power stations in Bahrain
Oil, Gas

The following is a list of the power stations in Bahrain.

== Oil ==
Name	Location	Capacity (MW)	Commissioned	Owner	Refs
Muharraq		30	1976		

== Gas ==
Name	Location	Capacity (MW)	Type	Commissioned	Owner	Refs
Al Ezzel	Muharraq	950		2006-2007		
Al Dur		1336		2010-2012		
Al Hidd	Muharraq	902		1999, 2004		
Sitrah	Sitrah	125		1975-1984		
Riffah	Riffah	700		1975-1984		
