= First Oil Well, Bahrain =

First oil well outside of Iran

Coordinates: 26.0269°N 50.5523°E

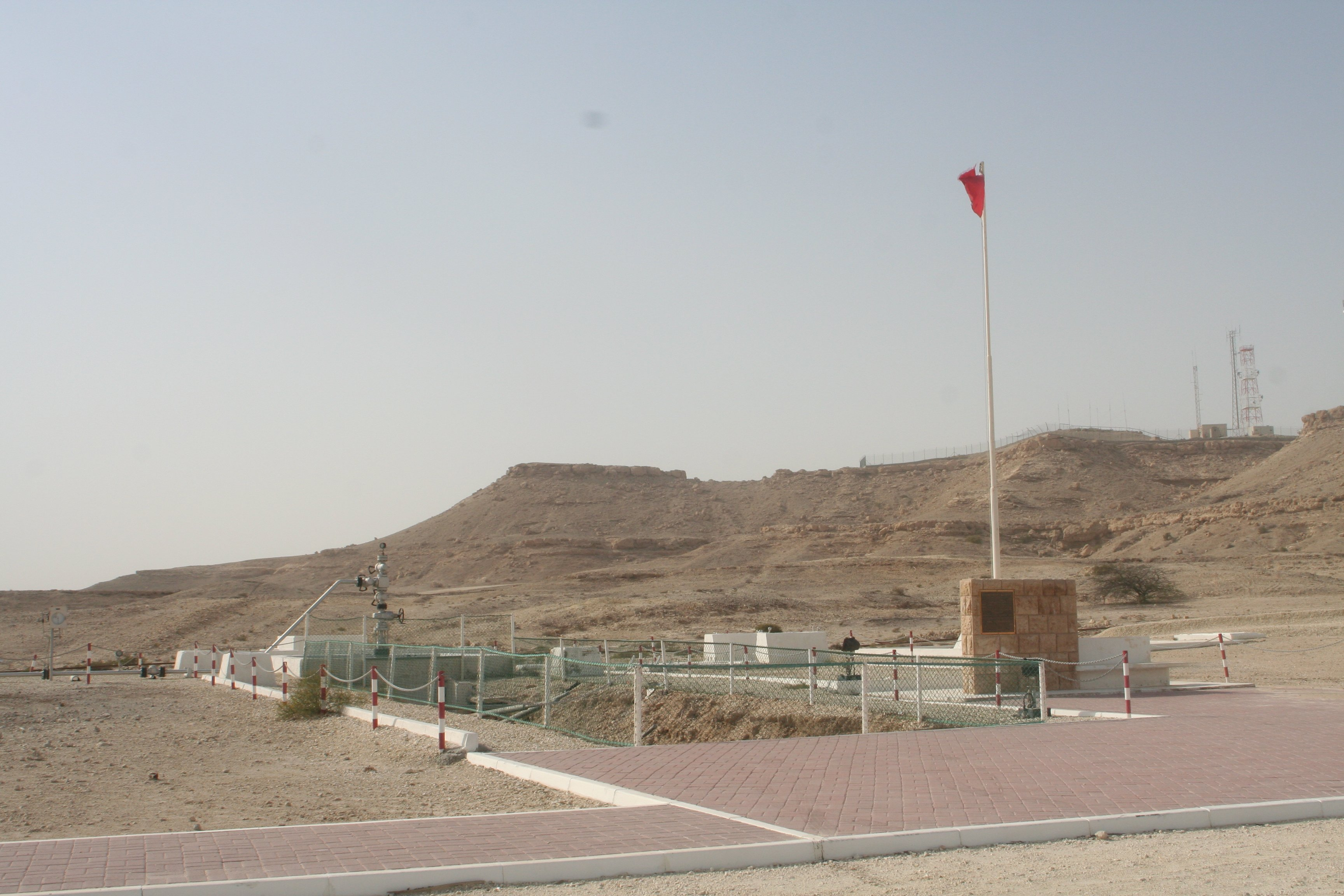
The first oil well in Bahrain was discovered in 1932.

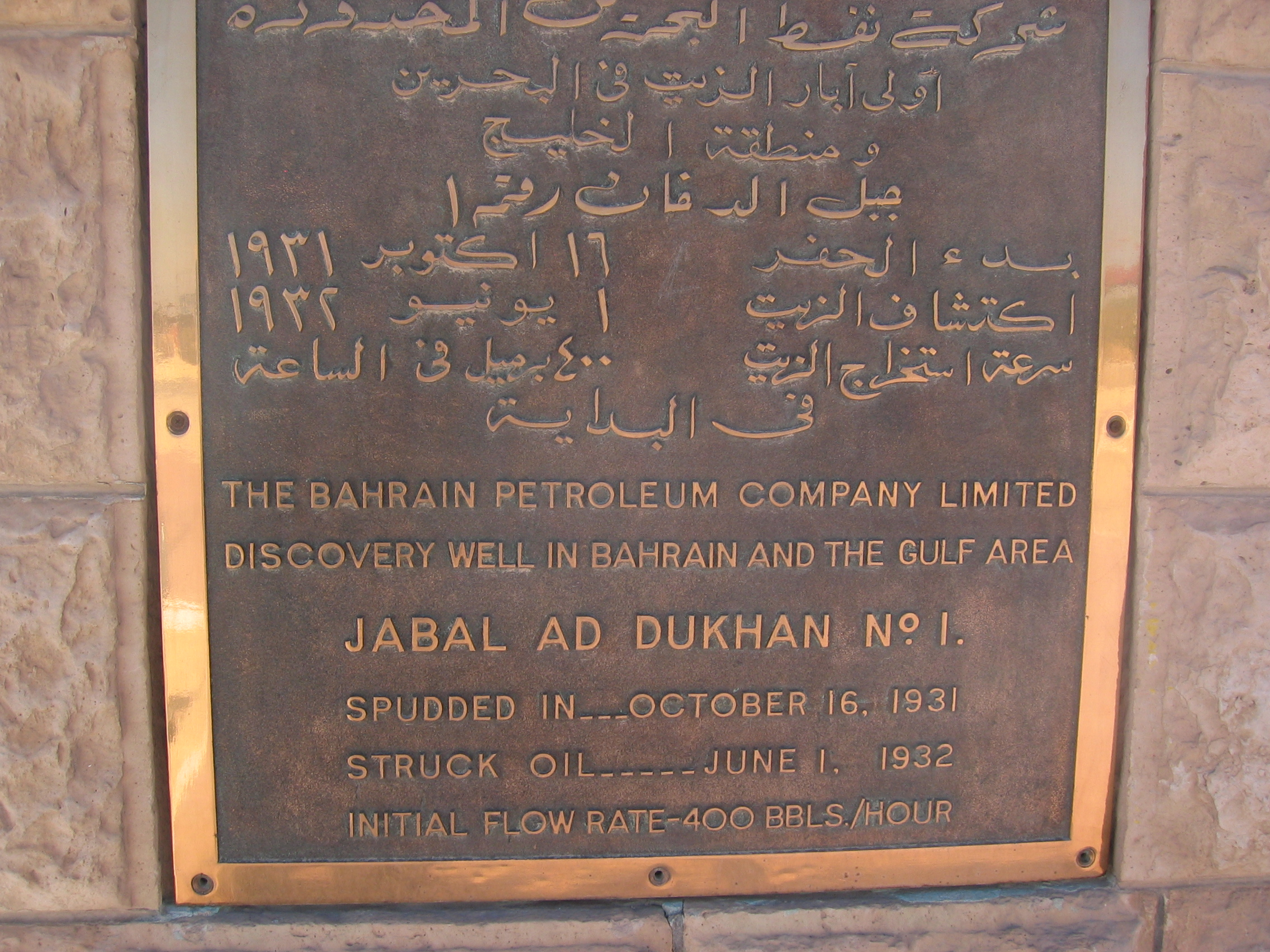
Plaque commemorating the discovery

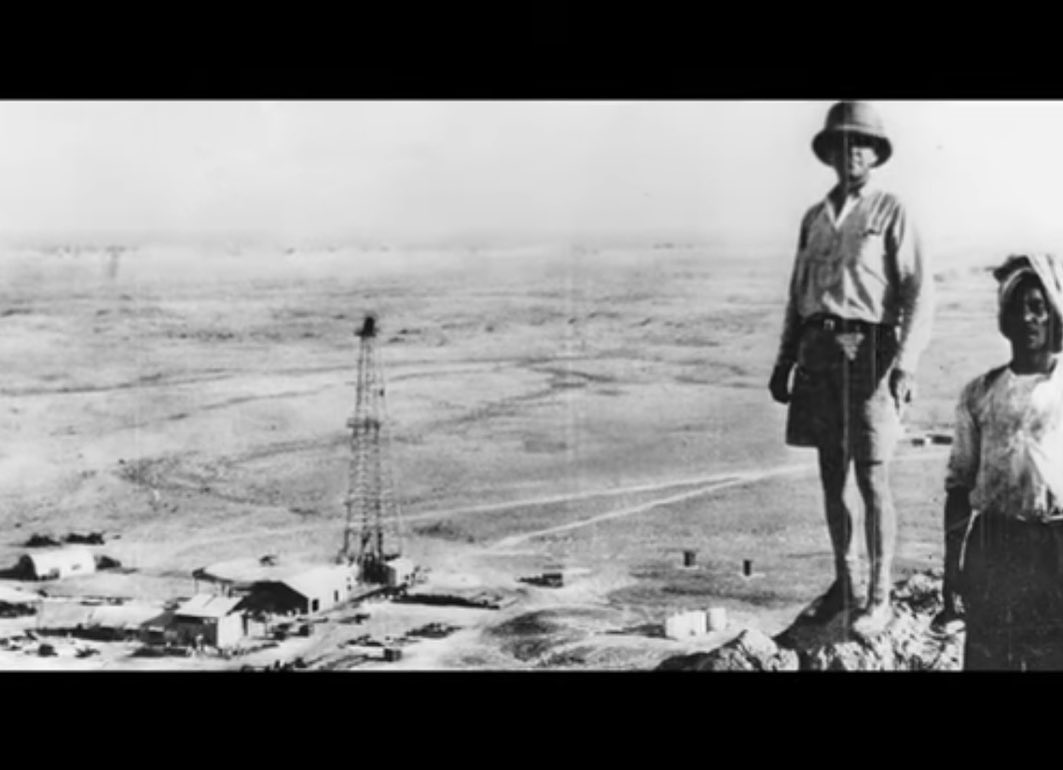
Oil well in the 1930s.

The first oil well in the southern side of the Persian Gulf (i.e. outside of Iran) and is located in Bahrain. The well is situated below Jabal Dukhan. It was discovered and operated by Bahrain Petroleum Company (BAPCO), established in 1929 in Canada by Standard Oil Company of California.

Oil first spurted from this well on 16 October 1931, and the well finally began to blow heads of oil on the morning of 2 June 1932. The initial oil flow rate was 9,600 barrels per day (1,530 m^{3}/d); by the 1970s the well produced 70,000 bbl/d (11,000 m^{3}/d), and after that it stabilized at about 35,000 bbl/d (5,600 m^{3}/d). In 1980, BAPCO was taken over by the Government of Bahrain. The well has now been reconstructed to its first appearance, and there is a stable close to it.

Bahrain was the first place on the southern side of the Persian Gulf where oil was discovered, and it coincided with the collapse of the world pearl market.

== See also ==
- Dammam No. 7, first commercial oil well in Saudi Arabia
