= Frank Holmes (geologist) =

British-New Zealand mining engineer

Frank Holmes (1874 – January 1947), known affectionately by Arabs as "Abu Naft" (the Father of Oil), was a British-New Zealand mining engineer, geologist and oil concession hunter. Following distinguished service in World War I, he was granted the title of honorary Major and was thereafter known as Major Frank Holmes in his civilian life.

== Early life and career ==
He was born in 1874 on at a remote work camp in New Zealand where his father was building a bridge. He attended Otago Boys' High School, Dunedin in 1888–89. At the age of 17, he was apprenticed to his uncle who was the general manager of a gold mine in southern Africa. For two decades, specialising in gold and tin, he worked as a mining engineer all over the world – Australia, China, Russia, Malaya, Mexico, Uruguay and Nigeria.

During World War I, he was a quartermaster in the British Army. In his efforts to source food and supplies for the British Army in Mesopotamia (today's Iraq), Holmes travelled widely through the Middle East and may have heard rumours of a possible oil seepage on the eastern seaboard of the Arabian peninsula. This, together with a close study of Admiralty maps of the area, appears to have triggered an abiding interest in oil in the region. By 1918, he was writing to his wife that "I personally believe that there will be developed an immense oil field running from Kuwait right down the mainland coast [of eastern Arabia]".

== Search for oil concessions ==
=== Arabia ===
In 1920, Holmes helped set up the Eastern and General Syndicate Ltd in London to develop, among other things, oil ventures in the Middle East. In 1922 he travelled to Arabia to discuss the possibility of an oil concession with Emir Ibn Saud, who ruled parts of the eastern peninsula. With Ibn Saud's permission, he carried out a survey over four weeks in the desert and returned to Hofuf with earth samples which he claimed bore traces of oil. In order to allay the suspicions of British officials, Holmes claimed that he was looking for a rare butterfly, the Black Admiral of Qatif, although this deception appears not to have been effective. At the Uqair conference later in the year, Holmes approached Ibn Saud with a view to finalising a concession document but the British High Commissioner, Sir Percy Cox, persuaded Ibn Saud not to sign. It was only when the British government ended Ibn Saud's annual stipend in 1923 that Ibn Saud considered himself free of British control and awarded a concession to Holmes for the region of al-Hasa. But when a subsequent survey was unfavourable, and a financially challenged Eastern and General Syndicate failed to find a bidder, the concession for al-Hasa was allowed to lapse. Holmes, nevertheless, still entertained hopes of finding oil on Bahrain and concentrated his efforts there.

In 1932 Holmes travelled to Jeddah, where negotiations for an oil concession were going between Ibn Saud, SOCAL and Iraq Petroleum Company (IPC) for a new concession for the al-Hasa province. When Ibn Saud's adviser, the former British colonial officer Harry St. John Philby, got wind of his arrival he attempted to deter Holmes from joining the negotiations by informing him that he was persona non grata in Jeddah and was remembered for the failure to exploit the first al-Hasa concession. There was also the matter of £6,000 rent owed to Ibn Saud. Holmes appeared undaunted. "Holmes does not seem to share the otherwise universally held belief that Ibn Saud regards him unfavourably," wrote the IPC representative, Stephen Hemsley Longrigg. In fact, Holmes probably had no intention of joining in but simply wanted to exclude the Neutral Zone between Saudi Arabia and Kuwait from the negotiations. After three days, during which time he met with Saudi finance minister Abdullah Suleiman, Holmes left Jeddah and took no part in the al-Hasa negotiations. The concession for al-Hasa (excluding the Neutral Zone) went to SOCAL. The company formed an operating company, the California Arabian Standard Oil Company (CASOC), joined forces with the Texas Oil Company and struck commercial oil at Dammam in March 1938. CASOC went on to become Aramco in 1944.

=== Bahrain ===
In 1925 he persuaded the sheikh of Bahrain to give him an oil concession in exchange for drilling water wells. Armed with a favourable geological report and rock samples, Holmes set out to interest a major oil company in drilling for oil in Bahrain. The Gulf Oil Company showed an interest but was constrained by the Red Line Agreement which prevented the company from drilling on Bahrain without the consent of their partners in the Iraq Petroleum Company (IPC). Their partners declined, so Gulf assigned its interest to Standard Oil of California (SOCAL) for $50,000. SOCAL went on to strike oil in June 1932.

=== Qatar ===
In 1925, reports came into the Anglo-Persian Oil Company that Holmes was showing an interest in Qatar. Holmes had visited the Qatari ruler, Sheikh Abdullah, in his desert tent. When the sheikh's hunting dogs entered the tent and Holmes was able to identify the pedigree of one, the sheikh was most impressed. "If this man can identify one dog among so many, surely he can identify where our oil is hidden," he said, declaring that Holmes was his choice for the Qatar oil concession. Holmes also presented the sheikh with a motor car. This prompted Anglo-Persian to send a survey party led by George Martin Lees to Qatar. There were no firm indications of oil, but when oil was struck on Bahrain, this and a favourable survey persuaded Anglo Persian to sign a concession agreement with the sheikh in 1935. Holmes, in the meantime, had found his energies taken up with oil negotiations in Kuwait.

=== Kuwait ===
Kuwait lay outside the Red Line Agreement, so Gulf Oil was free to negotiate for an oil concession there, represented by Frank Holmes. When representatives of their rivals, Anglo-Persian, first attempted to negotiate with the Emir of Kuwait, Sheikh Ahmad al-Jaber al-Sabah, they found that Holmes was well ensconced with the Sheikh with the result that the company appointed William Richard Williamson to counter Holmes' influence. Eventually, Anglo-Persian decided to join forces with Holmes, and together they created a 50–50 venture, the Kuwait Oil Company. On 23 December 1934 Sheikh Ahmad signed an oil concession (covering the entire 15,800 square km of Kuwait for 75 years) to this new company and appointed Major Holmes as his representative in London. Oil was struck in Kuwait in February 1938.

=== Trucial Coast ===
In 1937, Holmes was instructed by Petroleum Concessions Ltd – an associate company of IPC – to complete oil concession agreements with the sheikhs of the Trucial Coast and the ruler of Oman but he proved dilatory and had to be relieved through ill-health. "I am sure that if Holmes comes to the Gulf there will be the usual atmosphere of confusion and intrigue which he creates wherever he goes and which sooner or later gives us much unnecessary trouble," wrote the British Political Resident from Bahrain, reflecting a widespread suspicion among British officials that Holmes was a threat to their country's interests in the Persian Gulf. To another official, he was simply "a rover in the world of oil".

== Achievements ==
Described as being "of powerful physique, of blunt speech and great strength of character", Holmes was not a trained petroleum geologist, but he relied on a knowledge of geology gained as a mining engineer and a certain intuition (what Holmes described as his "nose for oil") to locate areas where oil might be found. In the event, at a time when established opinion was generally pessimistic about finding oil in Arabia, Holmes' predictions were remarkably accurate. It is for these reasons that he earned from Arabs the sobriquet "Abu Naft", or the Father of Oil, although he remained a controversial figure.

== Death and legacy ==
After a short illness, Frank Holmes died of a heart attack in January 1947. In 2003, he was posthumously inducted into the New Zealand Business Hall of Fame.

== Sources ==
- Clarke, Angela (1990). Bahrain Oil and Development. Boulder CO: International Research Center for Energy & Economic Development. ISBN 0-918714-25-7.
- Chisholm, Archibald H.T. (1975). The First Kuwait Oil Concession Agreement: a Record of the Negotiations, 1911–1934. London: F. Cass. ISBN 0-7146-3002-0.
- Chisholm, A.H.T., Obituary of Frank Holmes in The Times (London) of 5 February 1947, page 7
- Keating, Aileen (2005). Mirage: Power, and the Hidden History of Arabian Oil. New York: Prometheus Books. ISBN 1-59102-346-7.
- Lambourn, Alan (c. 1991). Kuwait's Liquid Gold: The New Zealand Connection. Tauranga, New Zealand: Robert Allan Associates. ISBN 0-473-01222-7.
- Yergin, Daniel (1993). The Prize: The Epic Quest for Oil, Money and Power. New York: Simon & Schuster Ltd. ISBN 978-0-671-79932-8.
