= List of airports in Saudi Arabia =

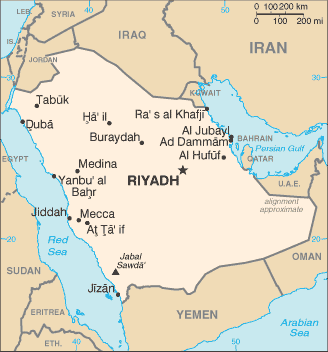
Map of Saudi Arabia

This is a list of airports in Saudi Arabia, grouped by type.

Saudi Arabia, officially the Kingdom of Saudi Arabia, is the largest Arab country of the Middle East. It is bordered by Jordan and Iraq on the north and northeast, Kuwait, Qatar, Bahrain and the United Arab Emirates on the east, Oman on the southeast, and Yemen on the south. The Persian Gulf lies to the northeast and the Red Sea to its west. The capital and largest city is Riyadh. King Abdulaziz International Airport at Jeddah is the busiest airport and is used heavily during the Hajj season.

== Airports ==
Airport names shown in bold have scheduled passenger service on commercial airlines. There are total 29 commercial airports across the kingdom and there are 13 international airports, 2 Regional airports and 14 Domestic airports.

City served	Province	ICAO	IATA	Airport name
International airports
Abha	Asir	OEAB	AHB	**Abha International Airport**
Al-Hofuf	Eastern	OEAH	HOF	**Al-Ahsa International Airport**
al-Ula	Medina	OEAO	ULH	**Al-Ula International Airport**
Buraidah	Al-Qassim	OEGS	ELQ	**Prince Naif bin Abdulaziz International Airport**
Dammam	Eastern	OEDF	DMM	**King Fahd International Airport**
Jeddah	Mecca	OEJN	JED	**King Abdulaziz International Airport**
Ḥa'il	Ḥa'il	OEHL	HAS	**Ha’il International Airport**
Medina	Medina	OEMA	MED	**Prince Mohammad bin Abdulaziz International Airport**
Neom	Tabuk	OENN	NUM	**Neom Bay Airport**
Riyadh	Riyadh	OERK	RUH	**King Khalid International Airport**
Taif	Mecca	OETF	TIF	**Taif International Airport**
Sakakah	Al-Jouf	OESK	AJF	**Al-Jouf International Airport**
Yanbu	Medina	OEYN	YNB	**Prince Abdul Mohsin Bin Abdulaziz International Airport**
Hanak	Tabuk	OERS	RSI	**Red Sea International Airport**
Jizan	Jazan	OEGN	GIZ	**King Abdullah bin Abdulaziz International Airport**
Tabuk	Tabuk	OETB	TUU	**Prince Sultan bin Abdulaziz Airport**
Regional airports
Najran	Najran	OENG	EAM	**Najran Regional Airport**
Domestic airports
Al-Bahah	Al-Bahah	OEBA	ABT	**Al-Bahah Domestic Airport**
Al-Wajh	Tabuk	OEWJ	EJH	**Al-Wajh Domestic Airport**
Arar	Northern Borders	OERR	RAE	**Arar Domestic Airport**
Bisha	Asir	OEBH	BHH	**Bisha Domestic Airport**
Dawadmi	Riyadh	OEDM	DWD	**Dawadmi Domestic Airport**
Qurayyat	Al-Jouf	OEGT	URY	**Gurayat Domestic Airport**
Jubail	Eastern	OEJB	QJB	Jubail Airport
Qaisumah, Hafar al-Batin	Eastern	OEPA	AQI	**Al Qaisumah/Hafr Al Batin Airport**
Rafha	Northern Borders	OERF	RAH	**Rafha Domestic Airport**
Sharurah	Najran	OESH	SHW	**Sharurah Domestic Airport**
Turaif	Northern Borders	OETR	TUI	**Turaif Domestic Airport**
Wadi al-Dawasir	Riyadh	OEWD	WAE	**Wadi al-Dawasir Domestic Airport**
Military airports
Dhahran	Eastern	OEDR	DHA	King Abdulaziz Air Base
Hafar al-Batin (KKMC)	Eastern	OEKK	KMC	King Saud Air Base
Khamis Mushait	Asir	OEKM	KMX	King Khalid Air Base
Jubail	Eastern	OEJL		King Abdulaziz Naval Base
Ras Mishab	Eastern	OERM		Ras Mishab Airport
Tabuk	Tabuk	OETB	TUU	King Faisal Air Base
Taif	Mecca	OETF	TIF	King Fahad Air Base
Aramco airports
Abqaiq	Eastern	OEBQ		Abqaiq Airport
Abu Ali Island	Eastern	OEAA		Abu Ali Airport
Al-Sadawi	Eastern	OEPK		IPSA-3 Airport
Haradh	Eastern	OEHR		Haradh Airport
Khafji	Eastern			Khafji Airport
Khurais	Eastern	OEKN		Khurais Airport
Ras Tanura	Eastern	OERT		Ras Tanura Airport
Shaybah	Eastern	OESB		Shaybah Airport
Tanajib	Eastern	OETN		Ras Tanajib Airport
Udhailiyah	Eastern	OEUD		Udhayliyah Airport
Future airports
Al-Faisaliah City	Mecca	TBD	TBD	Al-Faisaliah International Airport
Amaala	Tabuk Province	TBD	TBD	Amaala International Airport
Riyadh	Riyadh	TBD	TBD	King Salman International Airport
Baish	Jazan	TBD	TBD	New King Abdullah International Airport

== See also ==
- Transport in Saudi Arabia
- List of airlines in Saudi Arabia
- List of the busiest airports in the Middle East
- List of airports by ICAO code: O#OE - Saudi Arabia
- Wikipedia:WikiProject Aviation/Airline destination lists: Asia#Saudi Arabia
