= OEPA =

OEPA may refer to:

- OEPA, the ICAO airport code for Al Qaisumah/Hafr Al Batin Airport
- Office of the Environmental Protection Authority, provides administrative support for the Environmental Protection Authority of Western Australia
- Ohio Environmental Protection Agency
