= OERM =

OERM may refer to:

- The Orange Empire Railway Museum, a railway and streetcar museum in Perris, California
- The Oregon Electric Railway Museum, a streetcar museum in Brooks, Oregon
- The airport identifier code for Ras Mishab Airport, in Saudi Arabia
