= AQI =

AQI or Aqi may refer to:

- Air quality index
- Al-Qaeda in Iraq, a former jihadist organization
- Al Qaisumah/Hafr Al Batin Airport, Saudi Arabia (IATA code: AQI)
- Australian Questioning Intonation, a feature of some accents of English
- AQ Interactive, a former Japanese video game developer and publisher
- A'Qi, a character from the wuxia novel The Deer and the Cauldron
