= Khafji =

City and governorate in Eastern Province, Saudi Arabia

Khafji الخفجي
- City and Governorate
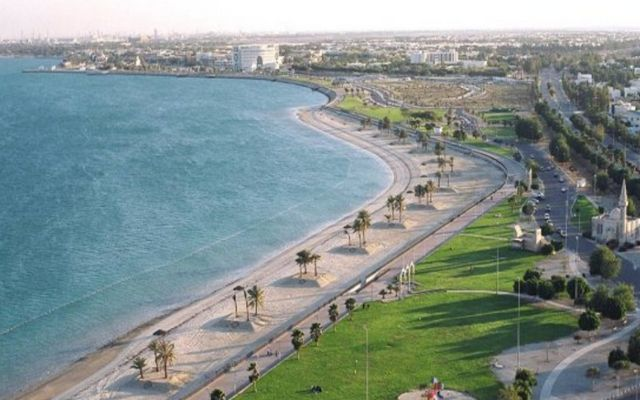
- Khafji Corniche

- Location of Khafji Governorate within the Eastern Province

- Location of Khafji within Saudi Arabia
- Coordinates: 28°25′16″N 48°29′44″E
- Country: Saudi Arabia
- Province: Eastern Province
- Region: Eastern Arabia
- Seat: Khafji City

Government
  - Type: Municipality
  - Body: Khafji Municipality

Area
  - City and Governorate: 8,000 km^{2} (3,100 sq mi)

Population (2022 census)
  - Metro: 84,316 (Khafji Governorate)
- Time zone: UTC+03:00 (SAST)
- Area code: 013

Khafji or Al-Khafji (Arabic: الخفجي) is a city and governorate in the Eastern Province of Saudi Arabia, located near the border with Kuwait.

== History ==
The border between Saudi Arabia and Kuwait was established following the Uqair Convention of 2 December 1922. The area that later included Khafji was part of the Saudi–Kuwaiti Neutral Zone, a 5,770 km² (2,230 sq mi) region left undefined by the agreement. Khafji occupied a portion of this zone. The borders of the Neutral Zone were not fully settled until 1970, when Saudi Arabia and Kuwait finalized the boundary.

Oil exploration cooperation between Saudi Arabia and Kuwait began in the 1950s. The development of Khafji as a city followed the discovery of oil.

In 1961, King Saud and the Emir of Kuwait, Abdullah Al-Sabah, visited Khafji to attend a ceremony marking the first shipment of crude oil from the area.

The origin of the name Khafji is uncertain. Some sources suggest it refers to a low-lying geographical feature, while others link it to the salinity of local water. Another explanation connects the name to the "khafaj", a desert plant that grows in the region during spring.

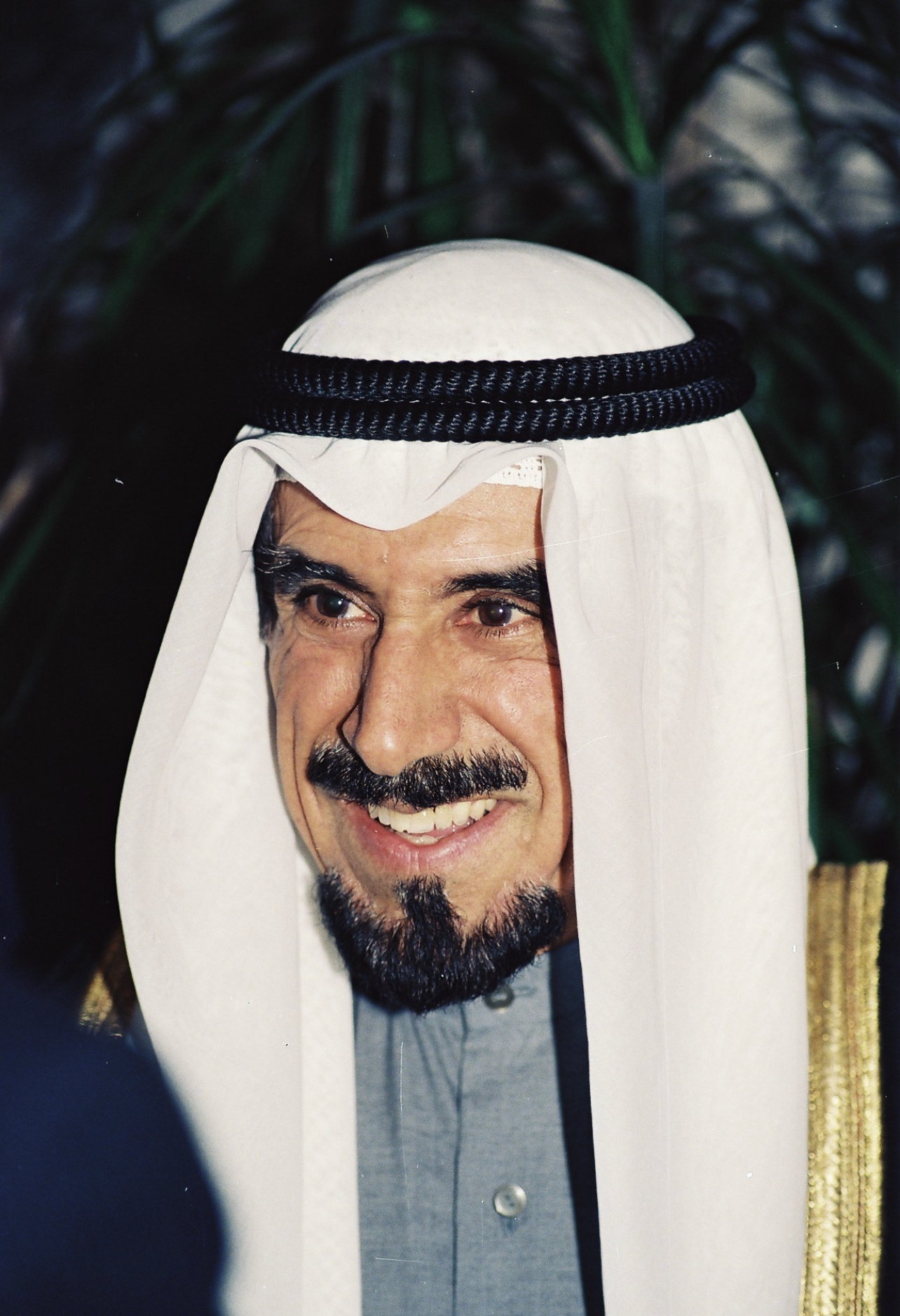
Emir of Kuwait, Jaber Al-Ahmad Al-Sabah, who briefly took refuge in Khafji following the Iraqi invasion of Kuwait in 1990.

During the Gulf War, Khafji gained international attention. After the Iraqi invasion of Kuwait in 1990, the Kuwaiti Emir, Jaber Al-Ahmad Al-Sabah, briefly took refuge in the city. In January 1991, Iraqi forces occupied Khafji for several days. Coalition forces, led by the 2nd Brigade of the Saudi Arabian National Guard, liberated the city during the Battle of Khafji, the first major ground engagement of the war.

== Geography ==
=== Location ===
Khafji (28°26′N 48°30′E) is located in Saudi Arabia's Eastern Province along the coast of the Persian Gulf. It lies 10 kilometres (6.2 mi) south of the Saudi–Kuwaiti border, 130 kilometres (81 mi) south of Kuwait City, and 300 kilometres (190 mi) north of Dammam.

=== Climate ===
Khafji has a hot desert climate (Köppen climate classification BWh).

Climate data for Khafji
Month	Jan	Feb	Mar	Apr	May	Jun	Jul	Aug	Sep	Oct	Nov	Dec	Year
Mean daily maximum °C (°F)	17.8 (64.0)	20.0 (68.0)	23.9 (75.0)	28.7 (83.7)	34.8 (94.6)	39.4 (102.9)	40.8 (105.4)	40.9 (105.6)	37.9 (100.2)	33.3 (91.9)	25.8 (78.4)	19.7 (67.5)	30.3 (86.4)
Mean daily minimum °C (°F)	9.8 (49.6)	8.7 (47.7)	13.1 (55.6)	17.5 (63.5)	22.9 (73.2)	27.2 (81.0)	28.8 (83.8)	28.3 (82.9)	24.8 (76.6)	20.7 (69.3)	15.1 (59.2)	9.8 (49.6)	18.9 (66.0)
Average precipitation mm (inches)	25 (1.0)	15 (0.6)	7 (0.3)	9 (0.4)	1 (0.0)	0 (0)	0 (0)	0 (0)	0 (0)	1 (0.0)	21 (0.8)	8 (0.3)	87 (3.4)
Source: Climate-data.org

== Economy ==
Khafji's economy is largely based on the oil industry. Nearby oil facilities such as the Safaniya Oil Field and the Tanajib industrial complex play an important role in the area's economic activity. Oil operations in Khafji are managed by Aramco Gulf Operations, a subsidiary of Saudi Aramco.

Khafji is also associated with offshore oil and gas operations in the shared offshore area between Saudi Arabia and Kuwait, including the disputed Durra Field, a natural gas field that has also been claimed by Iran and Iraq.

Due to its location near the Saudi–Kuwaiti border, Khafji is frequently visited by visitors from Kuwait, contributing to local commerce and tourism.

== Transportation ==
=== Air ===
Khafji does not have a civilian airport. The only airport in the governorate is Khafji Airport, which is used for Saudi Aramco operations. The closest airport offering commercial flights is Kuwait International Airport in Kuwait, approximately 79.6 km to the northeast. Qaisumah International Airport in Qaisumah, a markaz in the Hafar Al-Batin Governorate, is about 230 km to the west and provides primarily domestic flights with limited international services. King Fahd International Airport in Dammam is roughly 270 km away.

=== Border crossing ===
Khafji is home to one of Saudi Arabia's two border crossings with Kuwait. The Khafji Border Crossing is the busiest of the two.

== See also ==
- Provinces of Saudi Arabia
- List of governorates of Saudi Arabia
- List of cities and towns in Saudi Arabia
