= Abu Ali Island =

Island in Saudi Arabia

Native name: جزيرة أبو علي
- Interactive map of Abu Ali Island (click to zoom or switch to satellite view)

Geography
- Location: Persian Gulf (4.5 nmi (8.3 km; 5.2 mi) off the coast)
- Coordinates: 27°20′03″N 49°33′28″E
- Area: 59.30 km^{2} (22.90 sq mi)
- Length: 24.3 km (15.1 mi)

Administration
- Saudi Arabia
- Province: Eastern Province
- Governorate: Jubail Governorate

Additional information
- Abu Ali Airport

Abu Ali Island (Arabic: جزيرة أبو علي) is an island in Saudi Arabia, located in the Persian Gulf as part of Jubail Governorate in the Eastern Province. With an area of 59.30 km^{2} (22.90 sq mi), it is the largest Saudi island in the Gulf and lies 4.5 nmi (8.3 km; 5.2 mi) off the coast.

== History ==
Following the discovery of petroleum in Saudi Arabia, Abu Ali Island was developed as an operational hub for the country's oil industry. It houses major petroleum infrastructure, including oil processing plants and refining facilities, and is served by Abu Ali Airport, which is operated by Aramco for its employees.

== Ecology ==
Abu Ali Island features a coastal desert and marine ecosystem characterized by sand dunes, salt flats (sabkhas), mudflats, salt marshes, and mangrove stands. Since 2014, parts of the island have been managed as a biodiversity nature reserve by Aramco, and its surrounding waters lie within the Jubail Marine Protected Area.

=== Flora and habitats ===
Terrestrial vegetation consists primarily of salt-tolerant dwarf shrubs (halophytes) such as Suaeda and Zygophyllum species, alongside seasonal grasses and herbs that emerge following winter rainfall. Along sheltered shorelines, stands of grey mangrove (Avicennia marina) help stabilize the coast and serve as nursery habitats for juvenile fish and crustaceans.

=== Fauna ===
The island's sandy beaches and shallow waters provide nesting and foraging grounds for endangered green sea turtles (Chelonia mydas), critically endangered hawksbill sea turtles (Eretmochelys imbricata), and loggerhead sea turtles (Caretta caretta). Its intertidal mudflats and salt marshes also support resident and migratory birds, including the Socotra cormorant, greater flamingo, white-cheeked tern, blue-cheeked bee-eater, and crested lark. Terrestrial mammals and reptiles recorded on the island include the Arabian red fox, golden jackal, Arabian hare, jerboa, and desert monitor.

=== Conservation ===
Following heavy shoreline contamination from the 1983 Nowruz oil spill and the 1991 Gulf War oil spill, the island became a focus for coastal remediation and habitat restoration. Subsequent conservation measures have included large-scale mangrove planting and the November 2025 release of rehabilitated loggerhead and green sea turtles by the National Center for Wildlife. In June 2025, Saudi Aramco—in partnership with the Ministry of Energy and the Ministry of Environment, Water and Agriculture—also launched the Arabian Gulf branch of the Regional Center for Sustainable Development of Fisheries on Abu Ali Island, operating a marine hatchery to breed and restock depleted native Persian Gulf fish species.

== See also ==
- The Red Sea Destination
- Provinces of Saudi Arabia
- List of islands in the Red Sea
- List of islands of Saudi Arabia
- List of islands in the Persian Gulf
- List of governorates of Saudi Arabia
- List of cities and towns in Saudi Arabia
