= IPSA-3 Airport =

- IATA: none; ICAO: OEPK

Summary
- Airport type: Private
- Owner: Saudi Aramco
- Operator: Saudi Aramco
- Elevation AMSL: 1,000 ft / 305 m
- Coordinates: 27°57′00″N 46°44′30″E
- Interactive map of IPSA-3 Airport

Runways
Direction	Length		Surface
Direction	ft	m	Surface
16/34	6,007	1,831	Asphalt

IPSA-3 Airport is a small airport located in an oil complex about 95 kilometres (59 mi) southwest of Hafar al-Batin in the Eastern Province of Saudi Arabia. The airport serves a pump station along the Iraqi Pipeline in Saudi Arabia (IPSA).

== Facilities ==
The airport has one runway, 1,831 meters long and 30 meters wide, with lights.

== See also ==
- List of airports in Saudi Arabia
