= Abqaiq–Khurais attack =

2019 drone attack on Saudi oil processing facilities

- Part of the Iran–Saudi Arabia proxy conflict and Houthi–Saudi Arabian conflict (spillover of the Yemeni Civil War) and the 2019–2021 Persian Gulf crisis
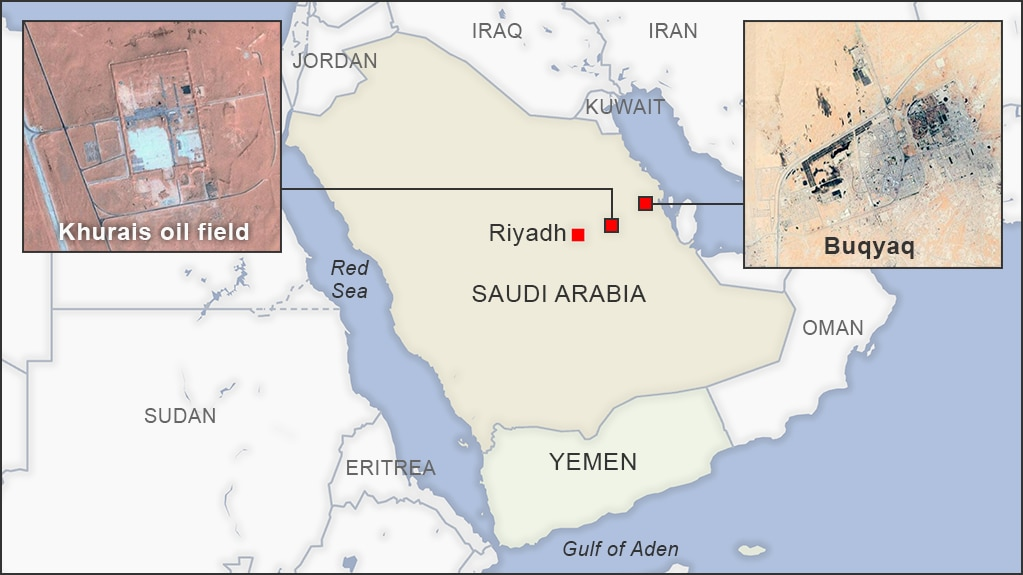
- Map and satellite imagery of the Abqaiq (Biqayq in Arabic) and Khurais facilities
- Type: Drone attack
- Location: Abqaiq and Khurais, Saudi Arabia: 25°55′43″N 49°41′09″E (Abqaiq); 25°15′53″N 48°06′36″E (Khurais)
- Target: Saudi Aramco facilities
- Date: 14 September 2019 c. 04:00 a.m. (SAST, UTC+3)
- Executed by: Houthis (claimed responsibility, denied by United Nations investigators); Iran (per Saudi and United States officials and United Nations investigators; denied by Iran)
- Outcome: Oil processing facility damaged with cost of repairs at hundreds of millions of USD; Aramco oil exports disrupted by 5.7 million barrels a day; Saudi stock market plummets; Spike in global oil prices; Aramco to effect repairs and resume oil production by end of September
- Casualties: Unknown/Unspecified injured

On 14 September 2019, drones were used to attack oil processing facilities at Abqaiq and Khurais in eastern Saudi Arabia. The facilities were operated by Saudi Aramco, the country's state-owned oil company. The Houthi movement in Yemen claimed responsibility, tying it to events surrounding the Saudi intervention in the Yemeni civil war. Saudi Arabian officials said that many more drones and cruise missiles were used for the attack and originated from the north and east, and that they were of Iranian manufacture. The United States and Saudi Arabia have stated that Iran was behind the attack while France, Germany, and the United Kingdom jointly stated Iran bears responsibility for it. Iran has denied any involvement. The situation exacerbated the 2019 Persian Gulf crisis.

The attack caused large fires at the processing facility, which were put out several hours later, according to Saudi Arabia's Ministry of Interior. Both facilities were shut down for repairs, cutting Saudi Arabia's oil production by about half – representing about five percent of global oil production – and causing some destabilization of global financial markets. The Ministry of Energy said that the country would tap into its oil reserves to maintain export levels until the facilities return to full capacity by the end of September.

== Background ==
Saudi Arabia is the world's largest oil exporter, having produced about 12 million barrels of petroleum products per day in 2017. Its proven oil reserves are the second-largest of any country, after Venezuela, and represent about 16% of the world's total.

Saudi Aramco, a national oil company owned by the Saudi Arabian government, operates several oil drilling, transport, and production facilities across Saudi Arabia. It is the second-largest oil producer in the world, behind Russia's Rosneft.

Aramco says the Abqaiq facility is "the largest crude oil stabilization plant in the world"; it converts sour crude into sweet crude oil by removing sulfur impurities before it is transported to downstream refineries, processing more than 7 million barrels of oil per day, about 7% of global oil production. Bob McNally, a former member of the United States' National Economic Council and National Security Council, told Reuters that "a successful attack on Abqaiq would be akin to a massive heart attack for the oil market and global economy". The Abqaiq facility had been the site of a failed suicide bombing by Al-Qaeda in 2006. The Khurais oil field, also operated by Aramco, produces about 1.5 million barrels of crude a day, and is estimated to hold up to 20 billion barrels of oil.

The Abqaiq oil facility was protected by three Skyguard short-range air defense batteries. Neither the Skyguards nor the other Saudi air-defense weapons — MIM-104 Patriot and Shahine (Crotale) — are known to have brought down any of the attacking weapons. A CNBC report offered multiple potential explanations, including that Patriot is optimized for interceping "high-altitude ballistic missiles" and that the Saudi troops operating the defenses "have 'low readiness, low competence, and are largely inattentive.'" The Guardian newspaper wrote that the defenses "would likely have been pointed across the Gulf towards Iran and south towards Yemen, but at least some of the missiles and drones are believed to have struck from the west." On 26 September 2019 Defense News published remarks by the Israeli air and missile defense expert Uzi Rubin, in which he characterized the Abqaiq–Khurais attack as "a kind of 'Pearl Harbor,'" saying "it will spark a lot of solutions" to the tactic of using unmanned aerial vehicle swarms plus low-altitude, high-speed cruise missiles.

== Attacks ==
External videos
- Fire at Saudi Arabia's oil facilities after drone attack, via Mehr News Agency

At around 4:00 a.m. Saudi Arabia Standard Time (UTC+3), Saudi Aramco reported fires at its Abqaiq facility as well as its Khurais facility. These facilities are several hundred kilometres distant from each other. At the time, about 200 people were in the Khurais facility, according to Aramco officials. The fires were contained a few hours later, according to officials. Though no fatalities were reported in the incidents, it was left unclear whether anyone was injured in the attacks.

Saudi Arabia's interior ministry said a few hours later that the fires were "a result of ... drones". Several unmanned aerial vehicles (UAVs or drones) were reported to be involved. A spokesman for the Saudi-led coalition fighting Iranian-backed rebels in Yemen, stated that 25 drones and missiles were used. Guards at the facilities reportedly tried to bring down the drones with machine gun fire, as captured on surveillance recordings of the facilities. According to Aramco, the drone strikes were in at least two waves; as they were evacuating the Khurais facility and dealing with fires from the first attack, another round of drones struck the facility.

Analysis of satellite images of the Abqaiq facility before and after the attacks appear to show 19 individual strikes: 14 that punctured storage tanks, 3 that disabled oil processing trains, and 2 more that damaged no equipment. A US interim report found that the attacks originated from the north.

According to the NCRI, the attack came from the Omidiyeh military base in Ahvaz.

== UAV defense ==
Saudi Arabia's missile defense system failed to stop the swarm of drones and cruise missiles that struck the oil infrastructure. It is reported that Saudi Arabia has at least one MIM-104 Patriot missile defense system in place at Abqaiq. The missile defense system used was designed to mitigate threats from "high flying targets". Unmanned aerial vehicles and cruise missiles fly at an altitude too low to be detected by conventional radar systems. A swarm of drones and cruise missiles coming from multiple directions can confuse and jam radar, as well as overwhelm air defenses. In addition to the Patriot system, at least four shorter-range defense systems were present, yet also failed to detect and mitigate the drone attack. Drones are too difficult to detect by traditional methods; drones are also cheap and extremely accessible. The drones used may have cost around $15,000 or less to build. According to Justin Bronk, research fellow at the Royal United Services Institute in London, "the cost curve is very favorable to the attacker, meaning Saudi Arabia would have to spend far more than its enemies to protect against additional strike capabilities. As such, there is almost no way the Kingdom can completely defend against such attacks."

== Attackers ==
In an initial report on 14 September 2019, the Saudi Arabian interior ministry did not identify the source of the attack, but stated they had begun an investigation. A statement from the French Foreign Minister in the early stages after the attack came on 17 September 2019, when he said, "The Houthis...announced that they launched this attack. That lacks credibility," but he went on to reference an ongoing international investigation, saying "let's wait for its results."

Hours after the attack, the Houthis said in a statement that they sent ten newly developed drones equipped with propeller and turbojet engines to disable the oil production facilities, and vowed to send more against a wider range of Saudi targets. They said they attacked in retaliation for the Saudi Arabian-led intervention in Yemen, which began in 2015, has killed thousands of Yemeni civilians, and has created a famine and a humanitarian crisis described in 2019 as the worst in the world. A military spokesman for the Houthis said, "These attacks are our right, and we promise the Saudi regime that the next operation will be wider and more painful if blockade and aggression continues".

In the weeks before the Abqaiq–Khurais attack, similar drone strikes on Saudi Arabian oil production infrastructure had caused no significant damage. The frequency of Houthi attacks increased throughout 2019, with the targets including a Saudi airport.

The military spokesman said that the Sept. 14 attacks came after a "careful intelligence operation, prior monitoring and cooperation from honorable and freedom-seeking people within the kingdom". The use of operatives inside Saudi Arabia would appear to address some of the technical objections about how the Houthis could have struck targets at such a distance.

On 16 September, the Houthis warned of more attacks on Saudi Arabia's oil infrastructure, and warned foreigners to leave Saudi oil plants.

They had displayed some of their long-range UAVs to the media in July 2019. The range of the drones reportedly can reach distant areas in Saudi Arabia and the United Arab Emirates. The Houthis had often used Samad 1 to attack Saudi Arabia. Later, the Houthis used the Quds 1, which is a small ground launched cruise missile that was possibly used in the 12 June 2019 Abha International Airport attack, which occurred in southwestern Saudi Arabia. A Houthi leader, Mohammed al-Bukhaiti, said that they have "exploited vulnerabilities in the Saudi defense system" and they "built their drones in order to avoid these systems, therefore, the Saudi and the Emirati airspace became open to us after their defense system failed to even spot our drones".

Houthi rebels have previously advocated targeting Aramco. The Rapidan Energy Group and the Center for Strategic and International Studies had both warned that the site of the attack was a vulnerable target.

At a press conference on 18 September, Houthi military spokesman Yahya Sarea said that they had launched a serious attack and Americans were using fabricated satellite images in an attempt to portray the resulting damage as having been minimal. He presented aerial photos of the Abqaiq and Khurais facilities, from before the attack, and said that they had been taken by Yemeni drones. He said that the Houthis had launched the attack from three locations. Third-generation Qasif drones were launched from one position, Samad-3 drones from a second position, and from a third position they had launched newly developed drones which use cluster heads, capable of dropping four accurate, independently targeted bombs. He said that they would soon display these newly developed drones. He stated that they were now capable of manufacturing drones rapidly.

Yahya Sarea threatened the United Arab Emirates which is part of the Saudi-led coalition, saying that they have a list of targets inside the UAE among them Dubai and Abu Dhabi. He said if the UAE "wants peace to its buildings which are made of glass and can't handle an attack by the Yemeni drones then leave Yemen alone". In response, UAE officials told The Telegraph newspaper that an attack by Houthis on tourism and global business hubs, would be an attack on the world.

Jean-Yves Le Drian, France's Minister of Foreign Affairs, stated on 19 September that preliminary findings from the investigation appear to rule out the Houthis' involvement and their claim "lacks credibility", but there would be no definitive conclusion until the international investigation is complete.

Officials for the United States had rejected the Houthis' claims, and instead said that Iran was responsible for the attacks. In the months prior, tensions between Iran and the United States created a crisis in the Persian Gulf, coupled with Iran's violations of the Joint Comprehensive Plan of Action related to their nuclear program in July 2019. On the day of the attacks, an unnamed senior US official said that Iran, not the Houthis, were behind the attack, which involved some dozen cruise missiles and more than 20 drones. The US said that it was working with Saudi Arabia to help investigate the attack and assure the facilities and energy supplies are secure and stable; US Secretary of State Mike Pompeo said that Iran was behind the attacks. US President Donald Trump initially stopped short of definitively blaming Iran for the attack, saying in an 18 September 2019 Newsweek article that "it was 'looking like' Iran was behind the attack."

Royal Saudi Air Force Colonel Turki al-Malki, a spokesperson for the Saudi-led coalition, issued a statement on 16 September saying that the drones appear to have been based on Iranian drones and that they were unlikely to have been launched from Yemen, counter to the claims of the Houthis. However, al-Malki said the coalition was still trying to determine the origin of the drones. At a press conference on 18 September, al-Malki showed debris of the drones, stating there were 18 drones and 7 missiles used in the attack (25 weapons in total), with the drones being delta wing-style craft of Iranian manufacture. Al-Malki showed surveillance footage that had, according to him, caught the drones traveling southward towards the facilities before the strike. He stated that this ruled out Yemen as a point of origin due to the range they would have had to have travelled. He concluded that this evidence "point[s] to Iran", and that the attack was "unquestionably sponsored by Iran". Iranian Defense Minister Brig. Gen. Amir Hatami stated in response to this new evidence, "These accusations are wholly, seriously and firmly rejected. It's easy to accuse someone without providing any proof."

On 17 September 2019, an unnamed senior US official told CBS News that the US had identified the location in Southern Iran from which they believe the drones and cruise missiles were launched, while two US Department of Defense officials told NPR that they had detected Iran preparing drone flights at multiple launch sites in Iran before the attack. Saudi Arabia has not reached the same conclusion that Iran was the staging ground for the attacks, becoming increasingly confident but not totally convinced, with the United States due to share more intelligence with Saudi Arabia. The United States stated it would provide evidence at the 2019 United Nations General Assembly that the attack involved cruise missiles from Iran. For example, the United States has stated it has "circumstantial evidence" that Iran launched the strike from its own soil in the form of satellite imagery which shows Iran readying drones and missiles at launch sites in Iran before Saudi oil facilities were attacked.

Late on 18 September, a US official speaking to CBS News said that Supreme Leader of Iran Ali Khamenei had signed off on the attacks but only on the assurance that the method of the attack would allow Iran to deny involvement. Coupled with the Saudi evidence, the US official stated that some of the attacks were launched from the Iranian Ahvaz Air Force Base, about 400 miles (640 km) from the targets, and flew through Kuwaiti air space.

France, Germany and the United Kingdom, who had been trying to calm relations between the United States and Iran, made statements reported on 17 and 18 September 2019 to the effect that they would conduct an investigation prior to announcing conclusions. On 23 September, while meeting at the 2019 UN Climate Action Summit, French President Emmanuel Macron, British Prime Minister Boris Johnson and German Chancellor Angela Merkel issued a joint statement "It is clear to us that Iran bears responsibility for this attack. There is no other plausible explanation." The three leaders committed to continuing their investigation on the attack and urged Iran to alter their course to avoid elevating further hostilities in the areas.

Iran has denied these statements and said that they were "blind, incomprehensible and meaningless" and warned the US that it was "ready for fully-fledged war" with them should there be retaliation against Iran. Instead, Iran stated that the Houthis (whom they reportedly support in the Yemeni Civil War) were responsible for the attack. Iranian President Hassan Rouhani has stated that "Yemeni people are exercising their legitimate right of defence... the attacks were a reciprocal response to aggression against Yemen for years." The Iranian Ministry of Defence has also rejected the statements about Iranian involvement and said, "the issue is very clear: there has been a conflict between two countries (Yemen and Saudi Arabia)".

In December 2019, the UN said that its investigation was not able to confirm the Saudi official claim that the weapons used in the attack are of Iranian origin. According to a confidential report by U.N. sanctions monitors seen by Reuters said that "despite their claims to the contrary, the Houthi forces did not launch the attacks on Abqaiq and Khurais on 14 September 2019."

According to a report by the Middle East Eye, an anonymous Iraqi intelligence official said the attacks were launched from Southern Iraqi Popular Mobilization Forces bases in retaliation to Israeli drone strikes on the Iraqi forces in August that were reportedly funded by Saudi Arabia. A CBS correspondent stated that the damage at the Abqaiq facilities reportedly was on the western-northwestern portions, which would have been difficult for the Houthis, located to the southwest, to have hit with drones. The BBC reported that satellite images showed damage on the western side of Abqaiq.

The office of the Prime Minister of Iraq denied that its territory was used to carry out the attacks and vowed to act "decisively" against anyone using Iraqi territory to attack other countries. The US has also stated that Iraqi territory was not used.

== Aftermath ==
=== Market impacts ===
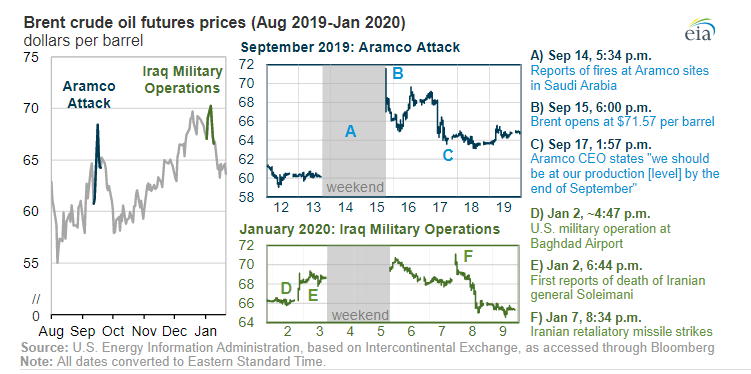
Impact of the attack on Brent Crude prices (top right, blue)

Saudi Arabian officials stated that the attacks forced the shutdown of the facilities, cutting the country's oil production from 9.8 to about 4.1 million barrels of oil a day, losing 5.7 million barrels of oil a day or about 5% of global production. Initially, spokespeople stated that the plants were expected to return to their nominal capacity by 16 September 2019, and would use reserve oil to make up for the shortfall. However, other officials for the Saudi government estimated the time to restore full production would be "weeks, not days".

The day after the attack, the Saudi stock market fell 2.3% in Sunday trading on 15 September. Commodities and stock markets as well as other financial indicators jumped on worldwide market openings on Monday, 16 September. Brent Crude oil futures prices surged almost 20 percent, the largest surge in the commodity's price since the 1990 Invasion of Kuwait. Other markets also saw impacts from concerns on the oil supply, including US gasoline and heating oil, and the gold market. Impact to the US, which had doubled its oil production in the last decade and was now the world's largest producer, was expected to be immaterial.

By Tuesday, 17 September, Saudi Arabian officials from the energy ministry stated that the repairs to the Abqaiq facility will be much faster than originally anticipated. The Abqaiq facility was operating at 2 million barrels per day within 48 hours of the attack. The energy ministry said full production could be restored within two to three weeks, by the end of September. Further, the nation planned no reduction of current oil exports, and will use reserve storage to maintain the current levels. These announcements were seen to help calm markets, as oil market prices and other financial indicators dropped during trading on 17 September from the spike the previous day, though still remained at elevated levels which are expected to have impacts on prices across the globe. To expedite repairs, Aramco shipped in equipment from the United States and Europe.

The state-owned Saudi Aramco had been in the initial stages of planning its initial public offering (IPO) of about 5% of the company ownership of the estimated US$1.5–2 trillion valuation of the company over the next few years. This IPO was originally to have started in 2018 but there were concerns about its finances and corporate structure. The September 2019 attacks further delayed this IPO until new concerns related to security against terrorism attacks and the ability to restore production after such an incident were proven, as well as the impact on the price of oil. The IPO was launched in December 2019, with 1.5% of the company put to public trading on the Tadawul exchange; it became the largest IPO ever at US$25.6 billion raised, and valuing the company at US$1.7 trillion, making it the largest listed company at launch.

On 27 September, Bloomberg News reported that while production capacity and exports implied that the industry was almost back to normal, that view may be overly simplistic, with output 1.8 million barrels a day below the pre-attack level and capacity reported to be only 700,000 barrels below the Kingdom's maximum. Until further repairs and adjustments, customers may be asked to accept heavier oil than the grades originally purchased.

=== Domestic reactions ===
The Saudi King, Salman bin Abdulaziz, issued a statement on 17 September, calling the attack a "vandalism and coward attack" that threatens international security and global energy supplies and said the kingdom is able to respond to these attacks. The king also said the attack comes after a series of attacks against the kingdom.

=== International reactions ===
The attacks raised concern over political stability in the Middle East, coupled with the US' stance that the attacks may have originated from Iran.

The United States is a close ally of Saudi Arabia, while its relationship with Iran has been strained in 2019 as part of the overall Persian Gulf crisis. US President Donald Trump authorised the release of the US Strategic Petroleum Reserve to help stabilize energy prices in the US. Trump further stated that the US is no longer dependent on oil from the Middle East. Trump condemned the attack and stated on Twitter on 15 September that the US military is "locked and loaded" but is waiting to hear from the Saudis as to who they believe was the cause of this attack, "and under what terms we would proceed". In the days that followed, Trump stated that he did not promise to protect the Saudis, but will have to sit with them and "work something out". On 20 September, Trump issued a new round of economic sanctions against Iran, targeting the Central Bank of Iran and the National Development Fund of Iran, preventing them from purchasing American dollars; these sanctions had been established earlier but had been previously lifted after Iran had agreed to the Joint Comprehensive Plan of Action. The sanctions are aimed to prevent Iran from having the funds to support future strikes.

On 15 September 2019, Reuters reported on remarks by international organizations by stating "U.N. Secretary-General Antonio Guterres condemned Saturday's attacks and called on all parties to exercise restraint and prevent any escalation. The European Union warned the strikes posed a real threat to regional security, and several nations urged restraint." Russian president Vladimir Putin's spokesman Dmitry Peskov, asked about the US statements that Iran was behind drone strikes, said: "We have a negative attitude towards rising tensions in the region and call for all countries in the region and outside of it to avoid any hasty steps or conclusions which may deepen destabilisation." Chinese foreign ministry spokesperson Hua Chunying, said in remarks quoted 16 September 2019 that while there is no "conclusive investigation", it is irresponsible to blame anyone for the attack, and added "we call on relevant parties avoid taking actions that bring about an escalation in regional tensions".

Other nations called for waiting for results from investigations before stating who was behind the attack. Turkish President Recep Tayyip Erdoğan said on 17 September 2019: "We have to look at how the conflict in Yemen started. This country was completely destroyed – who caused it?" That same day, Japan's defence minister said his country has not seen any intelligence showing Iranian involvement in the attacks. "We are not aware of any information that points to Iran," Defence Minister Tarō Kōno told reporters at a briefing. "We believe the Houthis carried out the attack based on the statement claiming responsibility." Also on 17 September 2019, White House deputy press secretary Hogan Gidley said the Trump administration "can't say definitively" that Iran was behind the attack. As of 18 September 2019, the United Arab Emirates had not yet attributed responsibility.

Several international bodies and nations condemned the attack. The UN Secretary General condemned the attacks on Saudi Arabia, claimed by the Houthis, and UN Special Envoy to Yemen Martin Griffiths said the attack "carries the risk of dragging Yemen into a regional conflagration" and that "there is 'no time to waste' in ending four years of fighting between Houthi rebels and the internationally-recognized Government, supported by a Saudi-led coalition, which has pushed the country to the brink of famine." Arab League in a statement by the General Secretariat on 14 September, strongly condemned the drone attacks and termed the attacks as "serious escalations" and called for preserving security of the country. NATO Secretary General Jens Stoltenberg "strongly condemned" the attacks and said Iran was "supporting different terrorist groups and being responsible for destabilising the whole region." In South Korea, the National Defence Minister Jeong Kyeong-doo denounced drone attacks on oil facilities as "a reckless act" that harms global security and stability. Saudi Crown Prince Mohammad bin Salman and South Korean President Moon Jae-in agreed to strengthen partnerships between the two countries to fight against the terrorist attacks.

During the Houthi "21 September revolution anniversary", the Houthi leader Muhammad Ali al-Houthi, offered to halt all attacks on Saudi Arabia. He said that Saudi Arabia should in return end its war in Yemen. The Houthis also warned that if Saudi Arabia refused their peace offer the next attacks will be more painful. The UN Yemen envoy, praised the Houthi announcement and said it could send a "powerful message of the will to end the war".

=== Related security issues ===
On 15 September 2019, the Cabinet of Kuwait said it was probing the sighting of a drone over its territory and coordinating with Saudi Arabia, and other countries, after the attacks. Kuwait has also increased its security as a result of the attack.

Russian President Vladimir Putin offered to sell Saudi Arabia the advanced S-400 missile system so it could use it against air attacks instead of continuing to use the Raytheon Patriot missile system. However, Putin made this offer beside a chuckling Iranian President Rouhani in what was described as a "sublime bit of political trolling".

By 11 October 2019, the United States had sent 3,000 additional troops to Saudi Arabia in response to the attack, which US Defense Secretary Mark Esper stated was to address "threats in the region" while protecting Saudi Arabia from "Iranian aggression". Secretive cyberattacks on Tehran internet capabilities followed the event and according to Iranian sources, a rocket attack on Iranian shipping in the Red Sea.

Uzi Rubin, a prominent Israeli military expert, described the attack as only one of the most audacious military surprises ever and a landmark event that bolstered Iran's prestige domestically and internationally in defiance of the US sanctions.

== See also ==
- Dahyan airstrike
- Iran–Saudi Arabia relations
- Petroleum politics
- Saudi-led airstrikes on Yemen
