= Khafji Airport =

Khafji-Legogo Airport
- IATA: none; ICAO: none

Summary
- Airport type: Private
- Owner: Saudi Aramco
- Operator: Saudi Aramco
- Serves: Khafji
- Location: Khafji
- Coordinates: 28°23′24″N 48°30′59″E
- Interactive map of Khafji-Legogo Airport

Runways
Direction	Length		Surface
Direction	ft	m	Surface
17/35	5,715	1,742	Asphalt

Khafji Airport (Arabic: مطار الخفجي) is a small airfield located southern the city of Khafji in the Eastern Province of Saudi Arabia. It occupies a small land area of approximately 0.45 km^{2} adjacent to the shore. The airstrip is owned by the national Saudi oil company Saudi Aramco, and used to be operated for local general aviation for company logistics. However, lately it seems to be not in use, making employees traveling from and to Khafji to use the Kuwait International Airport about 100 km north of the city in the nearby country of Kuwait. The ICAO designator of this field is OE45.

== Facilities ==
The airfield has one runway of 1,742 metres (5,715 ft) and 21 metres (69 ft) in width, and an area of 3,600 square metres (39,000 ft^{2}) for aircraft movement and parking outside the runway. Helipads are available at the airfield. A small but covered parking lot is available at the entrance of the airfield.

== See also ==
- List of airports in Saudi Arabia
