= Udhayliyah Airport =

- IATA: none; ICAO: OEUD

Summary
- Airport type: Private
- Owner: Saudi Aramco
- Operator: Saudi Aramco
- Serves: Udhailiyah
- Location: Udhailiyah
- Elevation AMSL: 759 ft / 231 m
- Coordinates: 25°09′06″N 49°19′42″E
- Interactive map of Udhayliyah Airport

Runways
Direction	Length		Surface
Direction	ft	m	Surface
18/36	7,171	2,185	Asphalt

Udhayliyah Airport is a small airport located in the village of Udhayliyah, 150 km southwest of Dammam in the Eastern Province of Saudi Arabia. It occupies a small area of 0.55 km^{2} east of the residential camp.

== Overview ==
Saudi Aramco, the national oil company in Saudi Arabia, owns the airfield and was being operated for domestic General Aviation used by the company for logistics. However, the company realized the opportunity of the utilization of the nearby airport in Hofuf which resulted in the local airport in Udhayliyah to become unused at the present time except for special flights by company executives.

The airport has one runway that is 2,185 meters long and 30 meters wide. Two parking/gates are available for medium-sized airplanes. The parking lot is located just outside the terminal.

== See also ==
- List of airports in Saudi Arabia
