= Khurais Airport =

- IATA: none; ICAO: OEKN

Summary
- Airport type: Private
- Owner: Saudi Aramco
- Serves: Khurais
- Location: Khurais
- Elevation AMSL: 1,362 ft / 415 m
- Coordinates: 25.2654°N 48.1782°E
- Interactive map of Khurais Airport

Runways
Direction	Length		Surface
Direction	ft	m	Surface
16/34	8,005	2,440	Asphalt

Khurais Airport is a small airport in the oil complex of Khurais in the Eastern Province of Saudi Arabia. The airport occupies an area of 1.2 km^{2} next to the residential camp. It has replaced the previous Khurais Airport (old).

== Overview ==
Saudi Aramco, the national oil company of Saudi Arabia, owns and operate the airport providing logistic support to the remote oil complex. Using Boeing 737 and Dash 8 aircraft, the company operates scheduled flights to Dammam for the headquarters in Dhahran.

== Facilities ==
The airport is equipped with one runway, 2,440 meters long and 46 meters wide. 7 parking/gates can be found there in addition to a helipad.

== See also ==
- List of airports in Saudi Arabia
