= Nariyah =

- Location within Saudi Arabia
- Coordinates: 27°28′11.48″N 48°29′3.74″E
- Country: Saudi Arabia
- Province: Eastern Province
- Time zone: UTC+3 (EAT)
  - Summer (DST): UTC+3 (EAT)

Nariyah, No'ayriyah, Nariya, or An Nariyah is a town situated at Eastern Province, Saudi Arabia. It has approximate total area of approximately 25 square km. It is located 150 km away from Jubail. As of the 2017 census, it had a population over 60,000. At the start of the Gulf War in 1990, hundreds of Kuwaiti refugees flooded into the town as it borders Kuwait.

According to the Saudi Census Statistics of 2022, the population of "Nariyah" was around 40,023 people. 63,815 people if you include the town plus all of the surrounding smaller villages and areas. Estimates say that in 2026, the population will be around 43,000 to 47,000 people.

== Transportation ==
=== Airport ===
The city is served by King Fahd International Airport, the terminal is at a driving distance of 190 km to the south east. Other than that, there are not much other forms of transportation, forcing most citizens to purchase their own vehicle or resort to online taxi services if they want to get around.

== Origins ==
In the 1950s, Saudi Aramco established a pumping station for the Trans-Arabian Pipeline (Tapline). This event was significant, as people began to gather around this new facility, eager to benefit from the services the company offered its employees. These services included the establishment of a hospital and the provision of potable water. Thus, Nariyah began to take shape, attracting more residents of tents, having previously been a barren desert.

== See also ==
- List of cities and towns in Saudi Arabia
