= Abu Ali Airport =

Airport in Saudi Arabia

- IATA: none; ICAO: OEAA

Summary
- Airport type: Private
- Owner: Saudi Aramco
- Operator: Saudi Aramco
- Serves: Jubail
- Location: Abu Ali Island
- Elevation AMSL: 3 ft / 1 m
- Coordinates: 27°19′07.5″N 49°35′12.4″E
- Interactive map of Abu Ali Airport

Runways
| Direction | Length | | Surface |
| Direction | ft | m | Surface |
|---|---|---|---|
| 15/33 | 4,956 | 1,511 | Asphalt |

Abu Ali Airport is a small airstrip in the Island of Abu Ali, part of Jubail area in the Eastern Province of Saudi Arabia. It is located about 35 kilometres (22 mi) north of the city and about 900 metres (0.6 mi) from the shores of the Persian Gulf, occupying a small land area of about 0.5 km^{2}.

== Overview ==
The airstrip is owned and was operated by Saudi Aramco, the national oil company of Saudi Arabia. It was used for the employees traveling between the island and other airports. However, during the last decade it has been idle for the reason that employees no longer need to travel for work while the nearby Jubail residential areas are growing.

== Facilities ==
The airfield has very poor infrastructure; no terminal is available, only a 2,200 m^{2} area for aircraft movement and parking outside the runway, that is 1,511 meters long and 27.5 meters wide with no lights or ILS support.

=== Parking ===
A small area on the side of the road at the entrance is allocated for car parking.

== See also ==
- List of airports in Saudi Arabia
