= Udhailiyah =

- Location within Saudi Arabia
- Country: Saudi Arabia
- Province: Eastern Province
- Time zone: UTC+3 (Arabian Standard Time)

Udhailiyah (Arabic: العضيلية ʿuḍayliyyah) is a small, isolated, family compound of the oil giant Aramco in the interior of the Eastern Province of Saudi Arabia in the desert southwest of the Dhahran-Dammam-Khobar metropolitan area. Built by the national oil company Saudi Aramco, Udhailiyah has a population of approximately 1,350 residents. The English spellings Udeliya, Udayliyah, and other variations are also used, with the same pronunciation. Udhailiyah, also known as the Flower City, is on the outskirts of the Rub'al-Khali.

Udhailiyah compound (Aramco code: UDH) is the smallest of the four residential compounds built by Saudi Aramco, including Dhahran (the main administrative center), Ras Tanura (the main refinery and oil port), and Abqaiq. It is the southernmost and most isolated of the four communities, Abqaiq being its closest Saudi Aramco compound to the north, about an hour away by car. To the northeast is the city of Hofuf and the expansive al-Ahsa Oasis. Udhailiyah takes its natural character from the numerous rocky hills or outcroppings, called "jebels", that surround it. The tallest and most popular Jebel is "Pioneer Mountain." An equally popular and impressive jebel is named "747" as it is said to look like a Boeing 747 Jumbo Jet.

Like the other three compounds, Udhailiyah is surrounded by multiple perimeter fences, inside which Saudi Aramco employees and their dependents live. The community today is a multi-ethnic mosaic of Saudis, Americans, South Africans, other Arab nationalities (e.g. Egyptian and Jordanian), Indians, Pakistanis, etc.

Udhailiyah camp has amenities including swimming pools, weight rooms (separate for males and females), dining halls, golf course (oil-sand greens), tennis facilities, squash and racquetball courts, library and a commissary (small grocery store). There is also the Wahat Al-Ghawar, a large, air-conditioned tent used for company and social events. Udhailiyah is heavily planted with green spaces and open parks with large trees and extensive irrigation.

== History ==
The camp was originally a bachelor camp set up for drilling crews. In the late 1970s it was expanded extensively to accommodate western employees with families. Beginning in 1977, the camp began taking in additional employees with families as the Gas Gathering Program began to take shape. Providing housing for Aramco's Gas Projects Division and their principal contractors, Fluor Arabia, Santa Fe, C.E. Lummus, and others, a camp expansion that included green belts, adobe style town houses, and a new Kindergarten-through-ninth-grade school was designed by a California architecture firm. The camp was "mothballed" in the late 1980s following the completion of Phase IIA of the Gas Program, and reopened in the early 1990s near the end of Operation Desert Storm. In the years following Desert Storm, management kept the camp open and quietly played down any connection between Western personnel and the US military presence in the kingdom. Udhailiyah had originally been built to accommodate far more people than the amount that were housed.

On 13 May 2015, a fire erupted at Udhailiyah's dining hall, the Jebel Complex, thought due to a malfunction with the primary oven of the restaurant. No casualties were reported. Subsequently the dining hall was rebuilt into a facility called the House of Jasmin, which accommodates the Lotus Restaurant, the Falcon Snack Bar, a library, bowling alley and games center.

The Udhailiyah compound is reserved for Saudi Aramco employees with families, and some contractor employees with families.

== Transportation ==
=== Airport ===
There is a small single strip airport near Udhailiyah (Udhayliyah Airport) operated by Saudi Aramco and not open for commercial air traffic. Saudi Aramco also utilizes the nearby Al-Ahsa International Airport in Hofuf which is 45 km away from Udhailiyah and operates international flights to regional destinations such as Dubai and Doha. Full international air transportation is available at the King Fahd International Airport, about 200 km away.

== See also ==
- Abqaiq
- Dhahran
- Mutawa
- Ras Tanura
