= Ras Mishab Airport =

- IATA: none; ICAO: OERM

Summary
- Airport type: Military
- Owner: Ministry of Defence and Aviation
- Operator: Royal Saudi Navy
- Location: Ras Mishab
- Elevation AMSL: 13 ft / 4 m
- Coordinates: 28°04′44.5″N 048°36′40.4″E
- Interactive map of Ras Mishab Airport

Runways
Direction	Length		Surface
Direction	ft	m	Surface
16/34	10,551	3,216	Asphalt

Ras Mishab Airport is a small military airfield in the naval complex of Ras Mishab on the Persian Gulf about 160 kilometres (99 mi) northwest of Jubail in the Eastern Province of Saudi Arabia. It occupies an area of around 2.8 square kilometres (1.1 mi^{2}) and is 850 metres (0.5 mi) from the shore.

There were two airfields in Ras Mishab in 1959.

== Facilities ==
The airfield has one runway, 3,216 metres (10,551 ft) long and 61 metres (200 ft) wide, with lights and ILS support. Several zones allocated near the runway for aircraft parking.

== Incidents and use ==
The naval facility was used during the 1990 Gulf War by the US Armed Forces. A Royal Saudi Air Force C-130 Hercules crashed during approach to the airport during the same war. The plane crashed in the dark and fog at 4:45 a.m. on 21 March 1991. U.S. Marines on guard duty from Battalion Landing Team, 3rd Battalion, 1st Marines noticed a C-130 do a loop then an S-turn looking like it was coming in for a landing. Suddenly, it exploded. The Marine sentries immediately rushed to awaken other Marines and Navy medical personnel in the compound. The C-130 was a Saudi Air Force transport plane flying back to Mishab after taking Senegalese soldiers on a visit to Mecca. The official assessment of the probable cause of the crash was the thick black smoke from hundreds of burning oil wells nearby in Kuwait, which combined with the dark and fog obscured the flight crew's visibility. 92 Senegalese and 6 Saudis died in the crash. Three survivors were pulled from the wreckage by Navy Corpsmen, one of which later succumbed to his injuries. The remaining two were stabilized and transported to hospital. Also the Saudi pilots were not rated for instrument landings, and the control tower personnel had neglected to turn on the inclement weather beacons lining the runway. That evening, after the weather had cleared, the control tower personnel turned the beacons on.

== See also ==
- List of airports in Saudi Arabia
