= Qaisumah =

Markaz in Hafar Al-Batin Governorate, Eastern Province, Saudi Arabia

Qaisumah القيصومة
- Markaz
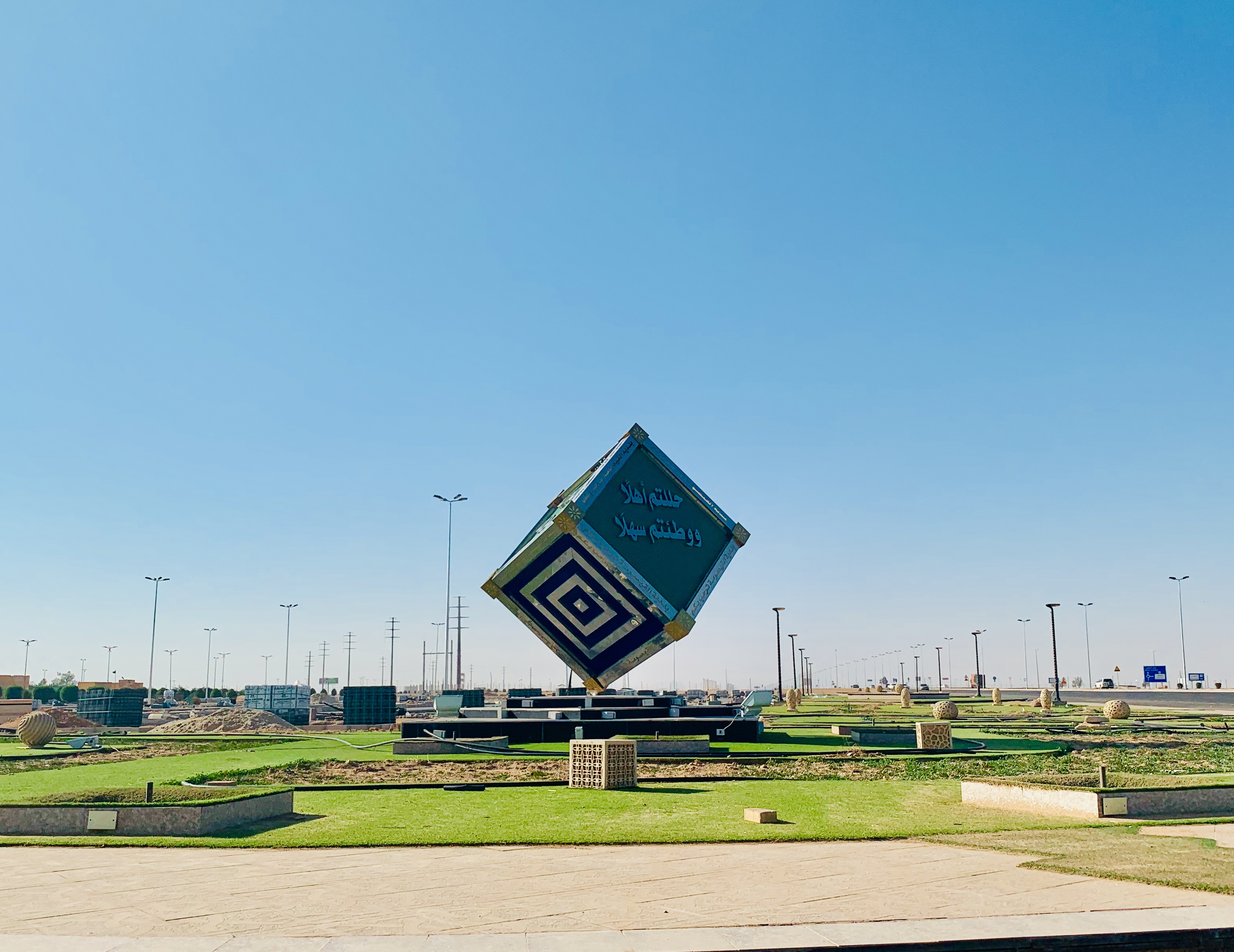

- Location of Qaisumah in Saudi Arabia
- Coordinates: 28°18′35″N 046°07′39″E
- Country: Saudi Arabia
- Province: Eastern Province
- Region: Eastern Arabia
- Governorate: Hafar Al-Batin

Government
  - Type: Municipality
  - Body: Hafar Al-Batin Municipality (Upper body); Qaisumah Municipality (Lower body)

Population (2022)
  - Total: 27,307
- Time zone: UTC+03:00 (SAST)
- Area code: 013

Qaisumah or Al-Qaisumah (Arabic: القيصومة) is a markaz located in Hafar Al-Batin Governorate in the Eastern Province, Saudi Arabia.

== History ==
Qaisumah takes its name from Achillea, a genus of flowering plants in the Asteraceae family native to the region. The settlement grew after the construction of the Trans-Arabian Pipeline, which brought economic activity and population growth. Al-Qaisumah FC, representing the markaz, was founded in 1970.

== Transportation ==
Qaisumah is served by Qaisumah International Airport, which is the primary and only airport in Hafar Al-Batin Governorate.

== Climate ==
Climate data for Al Qaysumah (1991–2020)
Month	Jan	Feb	Mar	Apr	May	Jun	Jul	Aug	Sep	Oct	Nov	Dec	Year
Record high °C (°F)	31.0 (87.8)	34.8 (94.6)	41.0 (105.8)	44.0 (111.2)	48.8 (119.8)	50.3 (122.5)	50.6 (123.1)	51.0 (123.8)	48.2 (118.8)	44.5 (112.1)	38.0 (100.4)	31.5 (88.7)	51.0 (123.8)
Mean daily maximum °C (°F)	18.6 (65.5)	21.8 (71.2)	27.0 (80.6)	33.5 (92.3)	39.9 (103.8)	43.7 (110.7)	45.1 (113.2)	45.4 (113.7)	42.3 (108.1)	36.4 (97.5)	26.2 (79.2)	20.2 (68.4)	33.3 (91.9)
Daily mean °C (°F)	12.0 (53.6)	14.7 (58.5)	19.6 (67.3)	25.8 (78.4)	32.2 (90.0)	36.0 (96.8)	37.4 (99.3)	37.3 (99.1)	33.9 (93.0)	28.1 (82.6)	19.2 (66.6)	13.5 (56.3)	25.8 (78.4)
Mean daily minimum °C (°F)	6.3 (43.3)	8.2 (46.8)	12.6 (54.7)	18.4 (65.1)	24.2 (75.6)	27.3 (81.1)	28.9 (84.0)	28.8 (83.8)	25.5 (77.9)	20.5 (68.9)	13.0 (55.4)	7.8 (46.0)	18.5 (65.3)
Record low °C (°F)	−4.2 (24.4)	−2.4 (27.7)	0.0 (32.0)	6.0 (42.8)	15.0 (59.0)	20.7 (69.3)	20.8 (69.4)	22.2 (72.0)	16.0 (60.8)	12.0 (53.6)	0.6 (33.1)	−3.0 (26.6)	−4.2 (24.4)
Average precipitation mm (inches)	18.7 (0.74)	11.7 (0.46)	14.0 (0.55)	11.4 (0.45)	3.4 (0.13)	0.1 (0.00)	0.0 (0.0)	0.0 (0.0)	0.0 (0.0)	3.8 (0.15)	27.2 (1.07)	18.5 (0.73)	108.8 (4.28)
Average precipitation days (≥ 1 mm)	2.7	1.9	2.3	2.4	0.7	0.0	0.0	0.0	0.0	0.6	3.0	2.5	16.0
Average relative humidity (%)	59	48	38	31	18	13	12	13	16	25	43	56	31
Source 1: World Meteorological Organization
Source 2: (humidity 1985-2010) "Jeddah Regional Climate Center South West Asia". Archived from the original on 2016-12-11.

== See also ==
- Provinces of Saudi Arabia
- List of governorates of Saudi Arabia
- List of cities and towns in Saudi Arabia
