= Nowruz oil field =

Oil field in Iran

Coordinates: 29.5333°N 49.5833°E

The Nowruz oil field located in the Persian Gulf, Iran, was the site of several 1983 oil spills.

== 1983 oil spills ==
One spill was initially caused by a tanker hitting a platform. In March, 1983, the platform was attacked by Iraqi helicopters and the spill caught fire. The Iran–Iraq War prevented technicians from capping the well until 18 September 1983. It was capped with cement. Eleven people were killed during the capping.

A separate spill occurred when Iraqi helicopters attacked a nearby platform in March 1983. The rig well was capped in May 1985. Nine men were killed during the capping. Approximately 733,000 barrels (100,000 tonnes) of oil were spilled because of this incident.

Overall, 80 million gallons (about 236,000 tonnes) of oil were spilled.
