= Al-Faisaliah City =

Planned urban development located in Mecca Province, Saudi Arabia

Al-Faisaliah City مدينة الفيصلية
- Planned city
- Interactive map of Al-Faisaliah City
- Location within Saudi Arabia
- Coordinates: 21°33′0″N 39°20′0″E
- Country: Saudi Arabia
- Province: Mecca Province
- Region: Hejaz
- Established: 26 July 2017; 9 years ago
- Named after: King Faisal

Government
  - Type: State-owned development
  - Body: Mecca Province Development Authority

Area
  - Total: 2,354 km^{2} (909 sq mi)

Population
  - Total: 5,600,000
  - Density: 2,400/km^{2} (6,200/sq mi)
- Time zone: UTC+03:00 (SAST)
- Area code: 012

Al-Faisaliah City (Arabic: مدينة الفيصلية) is a planned city in Mecca Province, Saudi Arabia. It will be located between the cities of Jeddah and Mecca, and is designed to ease population and infrastructure pressure on both cities.

== History ==
Al-Faisaliah City was officially announced on 26 July 2017 by Khalid Al-Faisal, the Governor of Mecca. The project was initially introduced under the name “Al-Salmaniyah City,” in honor of King Salman, during its early planning phase.

It was later renamed “Al-Faisaliah City” by King Salman as a tribute to his late brother, King Faisal, in recognition of his contributions to the development of Mecca Province.

== See also ==
- Provinces of Saudi Arabia
- List of governorates of Saudi Arabia
- List of cities and towns in Saudi Arabia
