= Khurais oil field =

Oil field in Saudi Arabia

- Location within Saudi Arabia
- Country: Saudi Arabia
- Coordinates: 25°04′10″N 48°11′42″E
- Operator: Saudi Aramco
- Service contractors: Halliburton

Field history
- Start of development: 2006
- Start of production: June 10, 2009

Khurais oil field (Arabic: حقل خريص) is an oil field in Saudi Arabia that went online on June 10, 2009, adjacent to the world's largest, the Ghawar trend. The Khurais field, with an area of 2,890 km^{2} and 127 km long, is located about 250 km southwest of Dhahran and 150 km east-northeast of Riyadh. Pilot-scale production at Khurais began in 1963, but the field was never fully developed.

== Khurais Megaproject ==
A project to develop this field along with Abu Jifan and Mazalij oil fields is called the Khurais Megaproject. The project began in 2006, is led by Halliburton for wells drilling, Snamprogetti for crude and utilities, Hyundai for gas. It was expected to cost $3 billion, and is expected to increase Saudi Arabia's export capacity from 11.3 to 12.5 million bpd. It will produce Arabian light crude, as well as 315 million scfd of sour gas for Shedgum Gas Plant and 70,000 bpd of Natural Gas Liquids (NGL) for Yanbu Gas Plant. The project costs reported during construction of the megaproject amounted to $10 billion.

In June 2009, Khurais came on stream with an additional 1.2 million barrels per day for the Saudi production capacity. The initial development prepared 232 oil-production wells, 58 observation wells and 119 water-injection wells before coming on stream. The complex is made up of the Khurais and the two smaller satellite fields of Abu Jifan and Mazalij, it also consists of the two principal oil-bearing reservoirs Arab-D and Hanifa carbonate formations.

In 2018, an expansion was completed which increased capacity to 1.5 million barrels per day.

The remote oil complex is served by Khurais Airport, which provides air service for personnel commuting on a weekly basis from the Dammam area.

On 14 September 2019, the Khurais field and processing facility was attacked by an aerial strike causing damages to four crude-stabilization towers and sections of piping. Restoration of 30% of production was possible within just 24 hours of the attack.

In 2024, Khurais was producing 1.1 million barrels per day and associated gas from the field was feeding the 1,108.8 MW Shedgum power plant in Saudi Arabia’s Eastern Province. The complex uses robotics and artificial intelligence for maintenance planning, satellite imagery for detecting spills and hazards, and drones to identify operational inefficiencies and fugitive methane leaks.

== See also ==
- 2019 Abqaiq–Khurais attack
