= Safaniya Oil Field =

Offshore oil field in Saudi Arabia

Safaniya Oil Field Saudi Arabia
- Location of the Safaniya oil field within Saudi Arabia
- Country: Saudi Arabia
- Region: Persian Gulf
- Offshore/onshore: offshore
- Coordinates: 28°16′48″N 48°45′0″E
- Operator: Saudi Aramco

Field history
- Discovery: 1951
- Start of production: 1957

Production
- Current production of oil: 1,200,000 barrels per day (~6.0×10^{7} t/a)
- Estimated oil in place: 37,000 million barrels (~5.0×10^{9} t)
- Estimated gas in place: 5,360×10^{9} cu ft (152×10^{9} m^{3})

Safaniya Oil Field (Arabic: حقل السفانية النفطي), operated and owned by Saudi Aramco, is the largest offshore oil field in the world. It is located about 265 kilometres (165 mi) north of the company headquarters in Dhahran on the coast of the Persian Gulf, Saudi Arabia. Measuring 50 by 15 kilometres (31.1 by 9.3 mi), the field has a producing capability of more than 1.2 million barrels per day (190×10^{3} m^{3}/d).

The oil field was discovered in 1951. It is considered the largest offshore oil field in the world. When it was first put in production in 1957, it flowed 50,000 barrels per day (7,900 m^{3}/d) of crude oil from 18 wells. At the beginning of 1962, it had the capability to handle 350,000 barrels per day (56,000 m^{3}/d) from 25 wells. Its reserves amount to around 37 billion barrels (5.9×10^{9} m^{3}) of oil and 5,360 billion cubic feet (152×10^{9} m^{3}) of natural gas.

== Production ==
The main producing reservoir is the Safaniya which is a cretaceous sandstone in the Wasia formation. Most geologist believe that the Safaniya field and the neutral Zone Khafji field share the same aquifer that continues toward Kuwait's Burgan field. The Safaniya field has several separate geologic production potential at depths between 4,000 and 7,000 feet. It was brought into production in 1957 at about 25,000 barrels per day. By 1993, there were a total of 624 wells in the field. When Saudi Arabia's oil production peaked in 1980–1981, Safaniya was producing over 1.5 million barrels per day. Today the field still produces 600,000 barrels per day and almost all of Safaniya's oil still comes from the Safaniya formation reservoirs. The Safaniya is also Saudi Arabia's primary supplier of heavy oil at an average API gravity of 27.

== Geology ==
The Safaniya Field is the largest offshore oil field in the world and is located in the Persian Gulf. The field is an anticline structure with production area of about 65 km long and 15 km wide. It is a series of structures trending NW-SE caused by uplift movement due to the Zagros reverse fault. Regional tectonic events such as compression occurred along eastern part of the Zagros belt during the Campanian which caused uplift and minor erosion of the Wasia Formation. The eroded units included the Mishrif Member and most of the Rumaila Member. This caused the Aruma unconformity to form. Because of the impact of the regional tectonic events during this time hydrocarbon traps started to form. Burial stage resumed and deposited the Aruma Formation at the end of the Campanian until the end of the Middle Eocene. In between Middle Eocene to Miocene, there was a stop in deposition events due to structural growth and non-deposition in the area. The last major event in the burial history of the area was Plio-Pleistocene Zagros orogeny which resulted in folding with NW-SE trends and uplift in the Persian Gulf area.

== Petroleum System ==
Saudi Arabia covers a large part of the Arabian Basin which is the primary producer of oil and gas. The basement structures beneath the Arabian Basin have controlled sediment deposition and structural growth of the basin. The main petroleum system of the Safaniya reservoir is the Mesozoic Petroleum System. The Mesozoic Petroleum System can be divided into two smaller petroleum systems, the Jurassic Petroleum System and Cretaceous Petroleum System. These small systems have generated hydrocarbons from the Jurassic to Cretaceous time period and largely contributed to the oil and gas production in the world's largest offshore field in Saudi Arabia the Safaniya Fields. The Jurassic Petroleum System consists of the Tuwaiq Mountain and Hanifa formations which are thick laminated organic rich lime mudstone units from the Jurassic period and contain a type II kerogen that has excellent source rock potential. The carbon isotope ratios between the oils (avg. δ 13C = - 26.6‰) and the kerogen (avg. δ 13C = - 26.4‰) and bitumen (avg. δ 13C = - 27.1‰) The typical seal rock in the Mesozoic petroleum system that separates the Jurassic oils from mixing with the Cretaceous oils is a permeable evaporites anhydrite with a thickness reaching up to 287 m. The seal is not well developed along the eastern and northeastern part of Saudi Arabia. This allows Jurassic oils to mix with Cretaceous oils and causes the production of Cretaceous oils mixed with Jurassic oils to be limited to the eastern and northeastern part of Saudi Arabia. The Cretaceous Petroleum System consists of the main reservoir in the Safaniya fields, the Safaniya member. The Safaniya member is a thick sequence of sandstone, siltstone and shale with thin intervals of limestone, coal and varying amounts of ironstone. The Mauddud Formation is intra-formational shales and tight carbonates that seals the reservoirs within the Safaniya Formation.

== Petroleum Movement ==
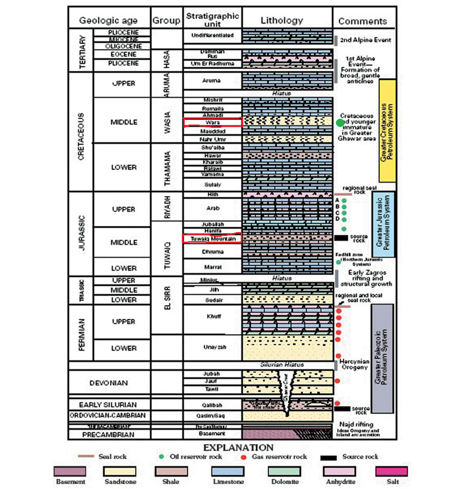
Stratigraphy graph of the Safaniya oil field explaining where the source rock, oil reservoirs and seal traps exists.

Jurassic source rocks began oil movement during the Late Cretaceous. The Tuwaiq Mountain source rock reached early stage maturity for oil generation at about 100 Ma and continued to attain its peak oil expulsion in the deeply buried areas at Early Tertiary time, approximately during a period of 65-54 Ma. Hydrocarbons generated then began to accumulate in fold structures around the region. At the eastern side of the basin oil generation and expulsion began about 75 Ma. By 50 Ma the oil had expanded westward and started filling structures that had formed during the late Cretaceous. Today the Hanifa and Tuwaiq Mountain source rocks in the east have passed through the oil generation window but may also still be within the oil generation window. In the western part of the basin the source rocks are still immature and soon will enter the oil window.

== Problems/Accidents ==
In February 2019, the oilfield was partially shutdown after a ship's anchor cut a main power cable. It decreased the capacity of oil production for around 2 weeks.

== See also ==
- King of Saudi Arabia
- Petroleum
- Saudi Aramco (oil company of Saudi Arabia)
