= Qaisumah–Hafar Al-Batin International Airport =

Airport in Saudi Arabia

Qaisumah–Hafar Al-Batin International Airport مطار القيصومة بحفر الباطن الدولي
- IATA: AQI; ICAO: OEPA

Summary
- Airport type: Public
- Owner: General Authority of Civil Aviation
- Operator: Dammam Airports Company
- Serves: Hafar Al-Batin and Khafji Governorates
- Location: Qaisumah, Eastern Province, Saudi Arabia
- Opened: 1962; 64 years ago
- Elevation AMSL: 1,174 ft (358 m)
- Coordinates: 28°20′06.8″N 046°07′29.8″E

Map
- Location of airport in Saudi Arabia

Runways
Direction	Length		Surface
Direction	m	ft	Surface
16/34	3,000	9,843	Asphalt

Qaisumah–Hafar Al-Batin Airport (IATA: AQI, ICAO: OEPA) is an international airport located in Qaisumah, within Hafar Al-Batin Governorate in Eastern Province, Saudi Arabia. The airport serves Hafar Al-Batin Governorate and neighboring Khafji Governorate.

== History ==
The airport opened in 1962 as a simple runway used by Dakota aircraft to transport Saudi Aramco employees between northern stations. It later developed into a facility with a 3,000-metre runway capable of handling Boeing 737 aircraft, along with a passenger terminal, a sewage system, a water treatment plant, and a standby power plant, covering a total area of 11 million square metres.

An expansion and development project was completed in 2022 to increase the airport’s capacity to more than 700,000 passengers annually. The project established a shared arrivals hall for both international and domestic flights and expanded the departure hall area by 238 percent.

On 28 February 2026, following the closure of Kuwaiti airspace and Kuwait International Airport during the Iran War, Kuwaiti airlines such as Jazeera Airways temporarily transferred their flights to the airport, which is located about 2.5 hours by road from Kuwait City.

== Facilities ==
The airport resides at an elevation of 1,174 feet (358 m) above mean sea level. It has one runway designated 16/34 with an asphalt surface measuring 3,000 by 45 metres (9,843 ft × 148 ft).

== Airlines and destinations ==
Airlines offering scheduled passenger service:

Airlines	Destinations
flydubai	Dubai–International
Nesma Airlines	Hail
Saudia	Jeddah, Riyadh

== See also ==
- Transport in Saudi Arabia
- List of airports in Saudi Arabia
