= Eastern Province, Saudi Arabia =

Administrative region of Saudi Arabia

Eastern Province المنطقة الشرقية
- Province
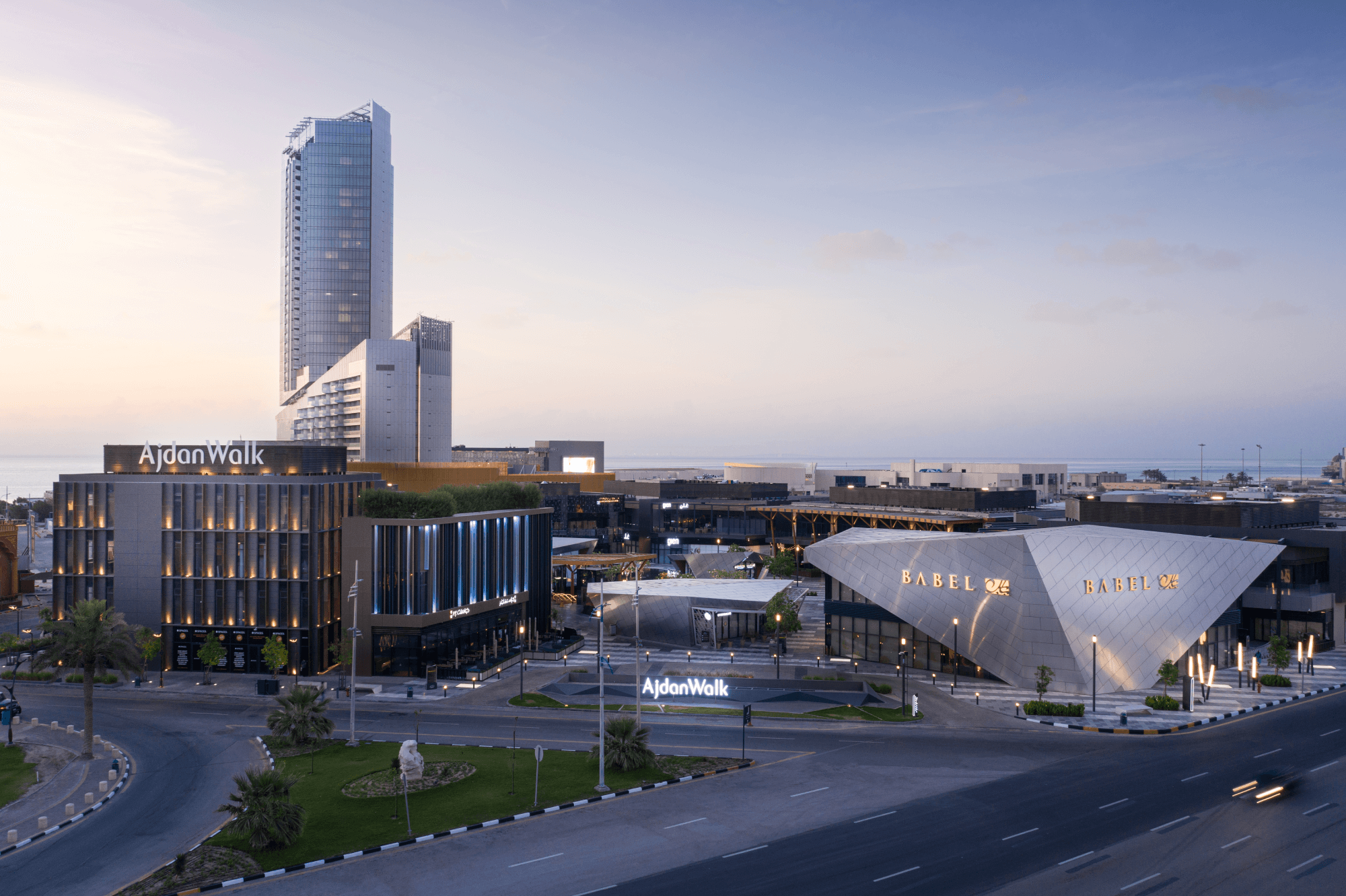
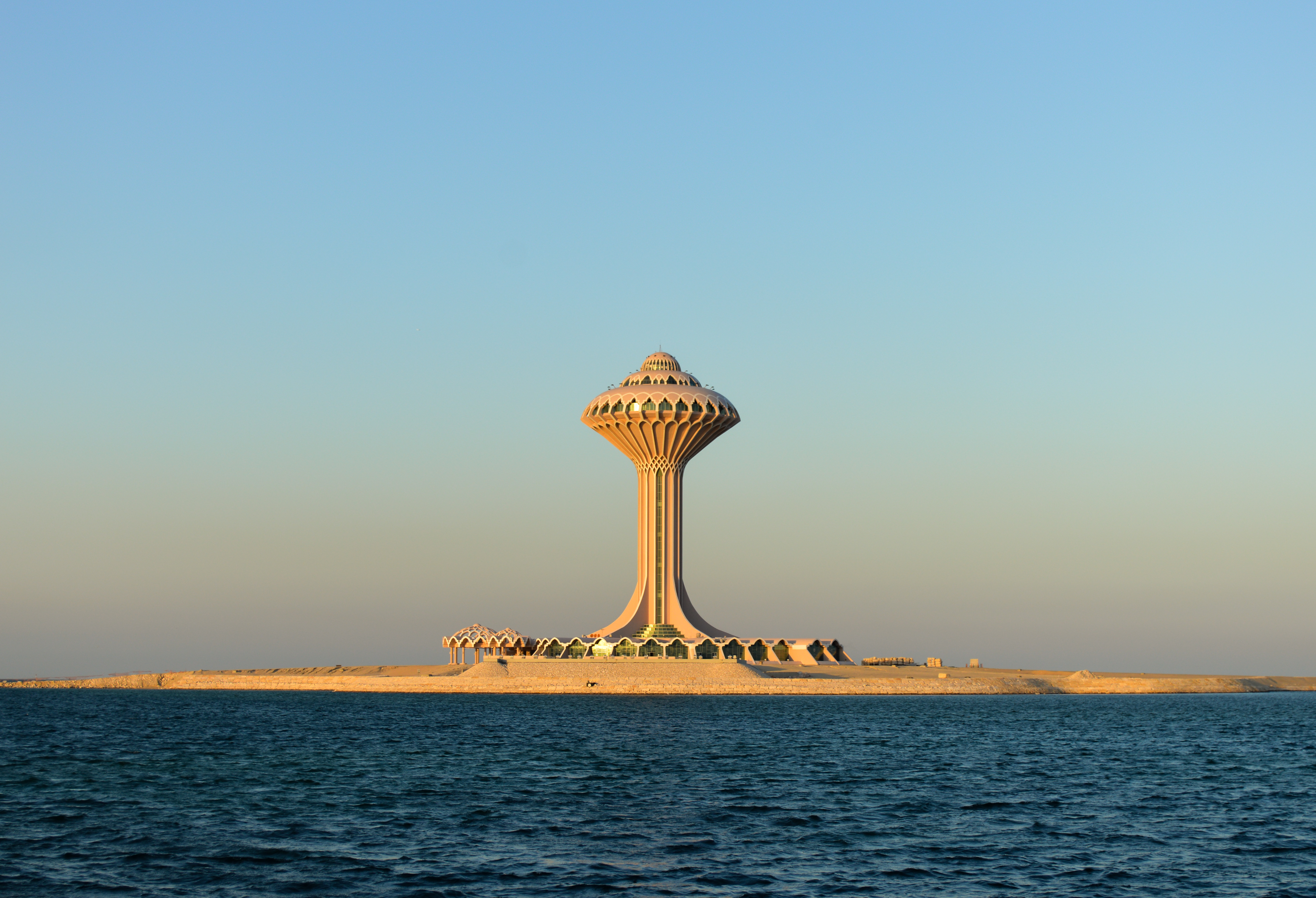
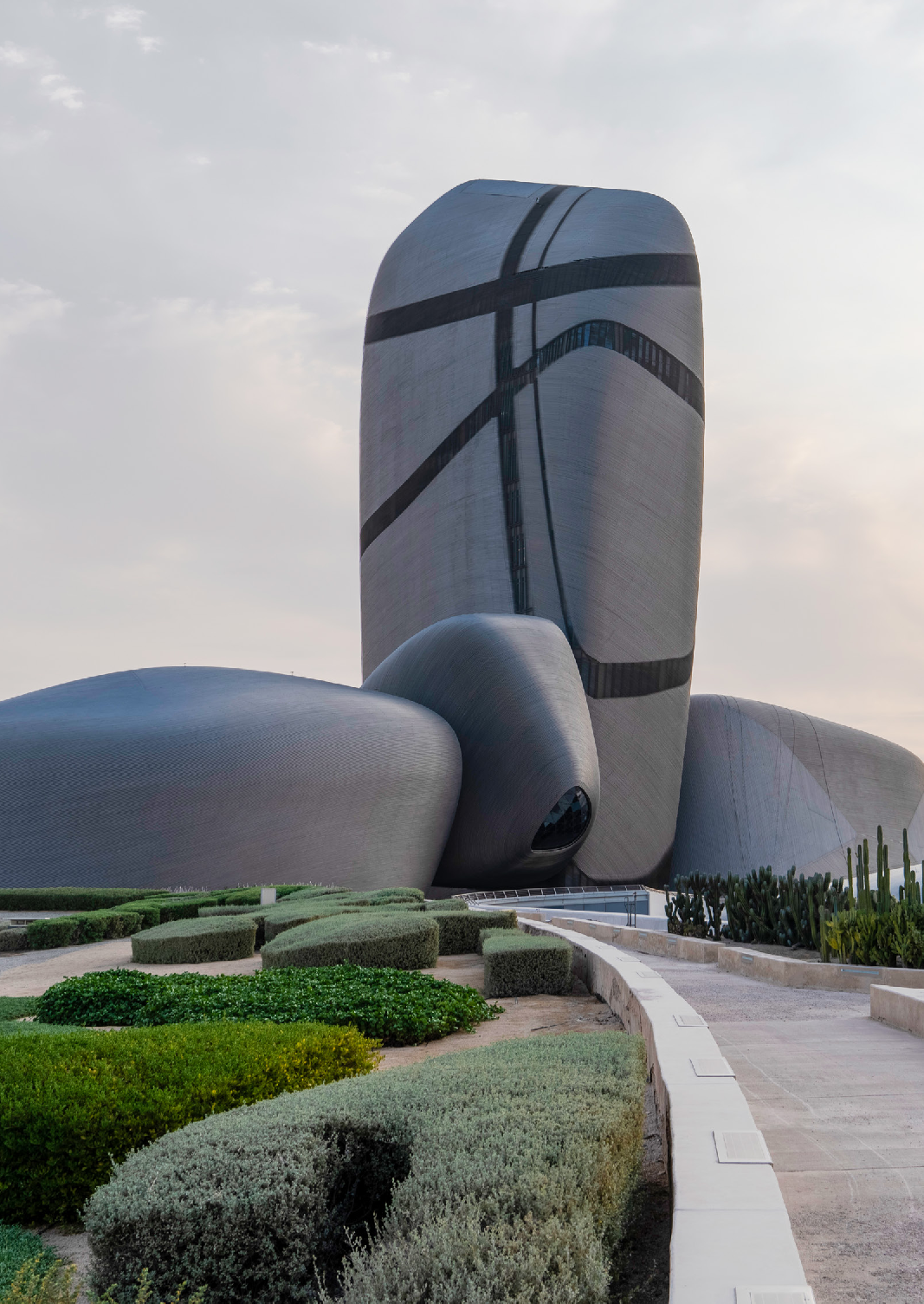
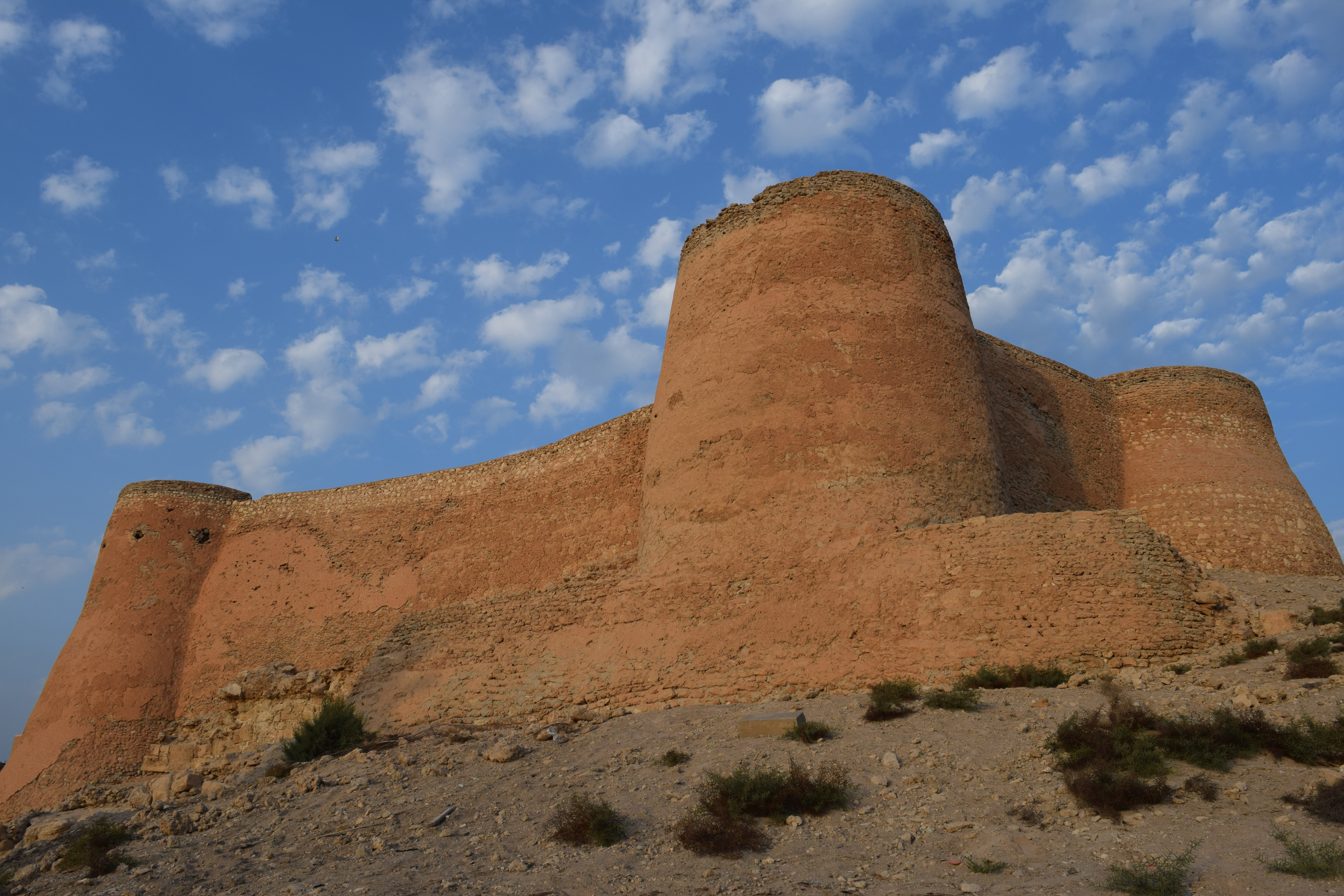
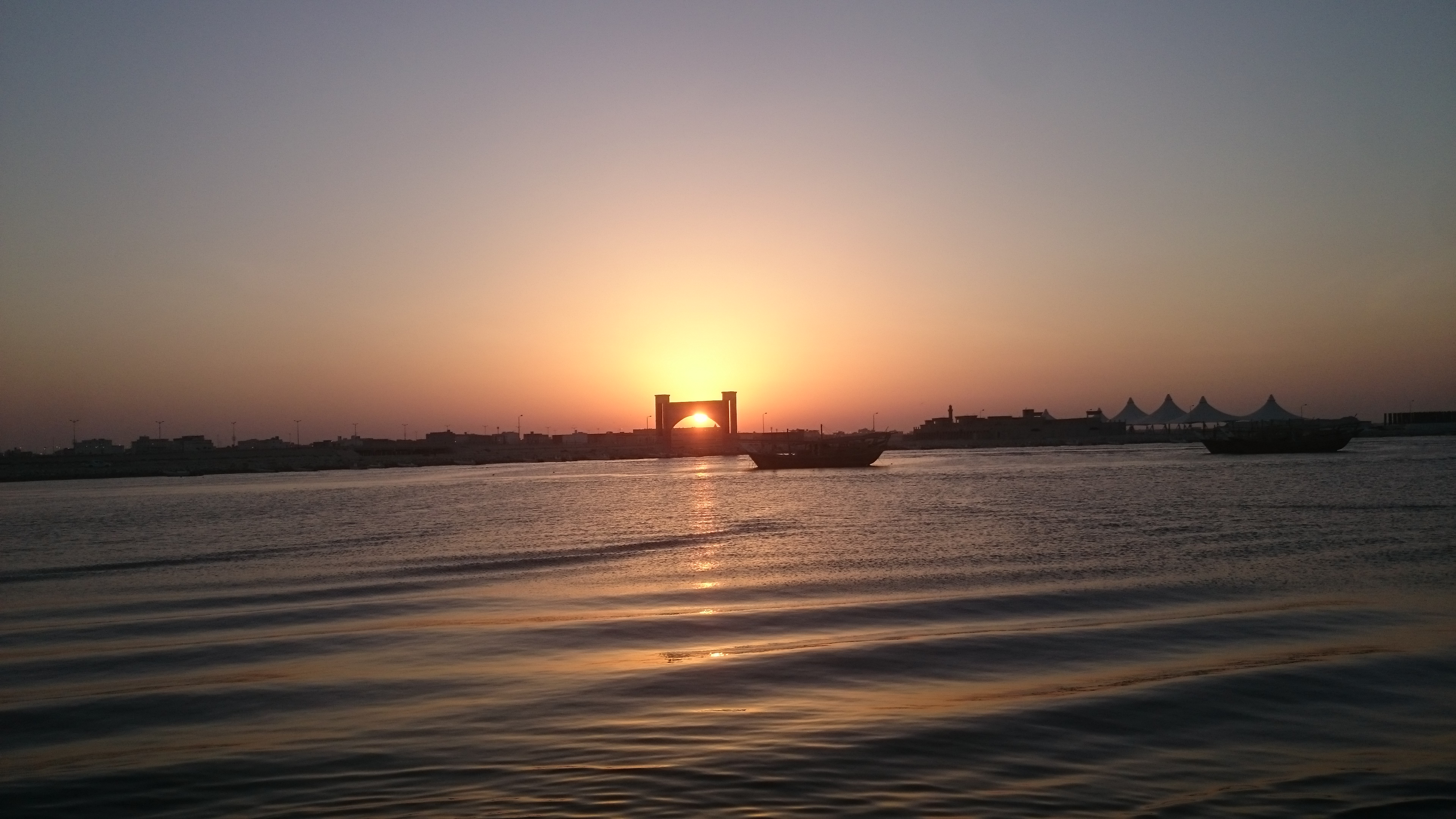
- Ajdan Walk Khobar Water Tower Ithra Center Tarout Castle Qatif Sea

- Seal

- Country: Saudi Arabia
- Region: Eastern Arabia
- Seat (and largest city): Dammam
- Governorates: 12

Government
  - Type: Development Authority / Municipality
  - Body: Sharqia Development Authority (Upper body); Eastern Province Municipality (Lower body)
  - Governor: Saud bin Nayef
  - Deputy Governor: Saud bin Bandar

Area
  - Total: 672,522 km^{2} (259,662 sq mi)
  - Rank: 1

Population (2022)
  - Total: 5,125,254
  - Rank: 3
  - Density: 7.62095/km^{2} (19.7382/sq mi)

GDP (2022)
  - Total: US$ 343.8 billion.
- Time zone: UTC+03:00 (SAST)
- Postal code: 3XXXX
- Area code: 013
- ISO 3166 code: SA–04
- Website: www.eamana.gov.sa

The Eastern Province (Arabic: المنطقة الشرقية, romanized: al-Mintaqah ash-Sharqīyah), also known as the Eastern Region, is a province in Saudi Arabia. It is the nation's largest province by area and the third most populous after Riyadh and Mecca provinces. As of 2022, the population is 5,125,254. Its name reflects its location in the eastern part of the country.

More than a third of the population is concentrated in the Dammam metropolitan area. With an estimated population of 1.53 million as of 2022, Dammam, the capital and largest city of the province, is the fourth most populous city in the kingdom. Other populous cities in the province include Qatif, Hofuf, Hafar al-Batin, Jubail and Khobar. The region is extremely popular among tourists for its beaches on the Persian Gulf and its proximity to the other countries of the eastern Arab world, such as the United Arab Emirates, Qatar and Bahrain, with the latter being linked to the province via the 25 km (15 mi) long King Fahd Causeway. The Province also shares a border with Oman, Yemen, Kuwait and Iraq. The province is bordered to the west, from north to south, by the provinces of the Northern Borders, Hail, Al-Qassim, Riyadh and Najran.

The Eastern Province encompasses the entire east coast of Saudi Arabia and acts as a major platform for most of the kingdom's oil production and exports. Oil was first found in the country in the Eastern Province, at the Prosperity Well site (formerly known as Dammam No.7). The Ghawar oil field, located in the Al-Ahsa Governorate, measuring 8,400 sq.km. (3,240 sq.mi.) is the largest oil field in the world, and accounts for roughly a third of the kingdom's oil production. The Safaniya oil field, located off the coast of the province, is the largest offshore oil field in the world. The Jubail Industrial City, part of the city of Jubail, the fifth most populous in the province, is the largest industrial city in the world.

The Province was home to the Dilmun civilization which was an ancient Semitic–speaking polity in Eastern Arabia. Founded in the late 4th millennium BC and lasting until approximately 538 BC it is regarded as one of the oldest civilizations in the world. Dilmun was an important and prosperous trading centre for millennia with well-developed and long-standing trading, commercial and cultural ties with nearby Mesopotamia in particular and the Indus Valley Civilisation. A number of scholars have suggested that Dilmun originally designated the eastern province of Saudi Arabia, notably linked with the major Dilmunite settlements of Umm an-Nussi and Umm ar-Ramadh in the interior and Tarout Island on the coast.

== Geography ==
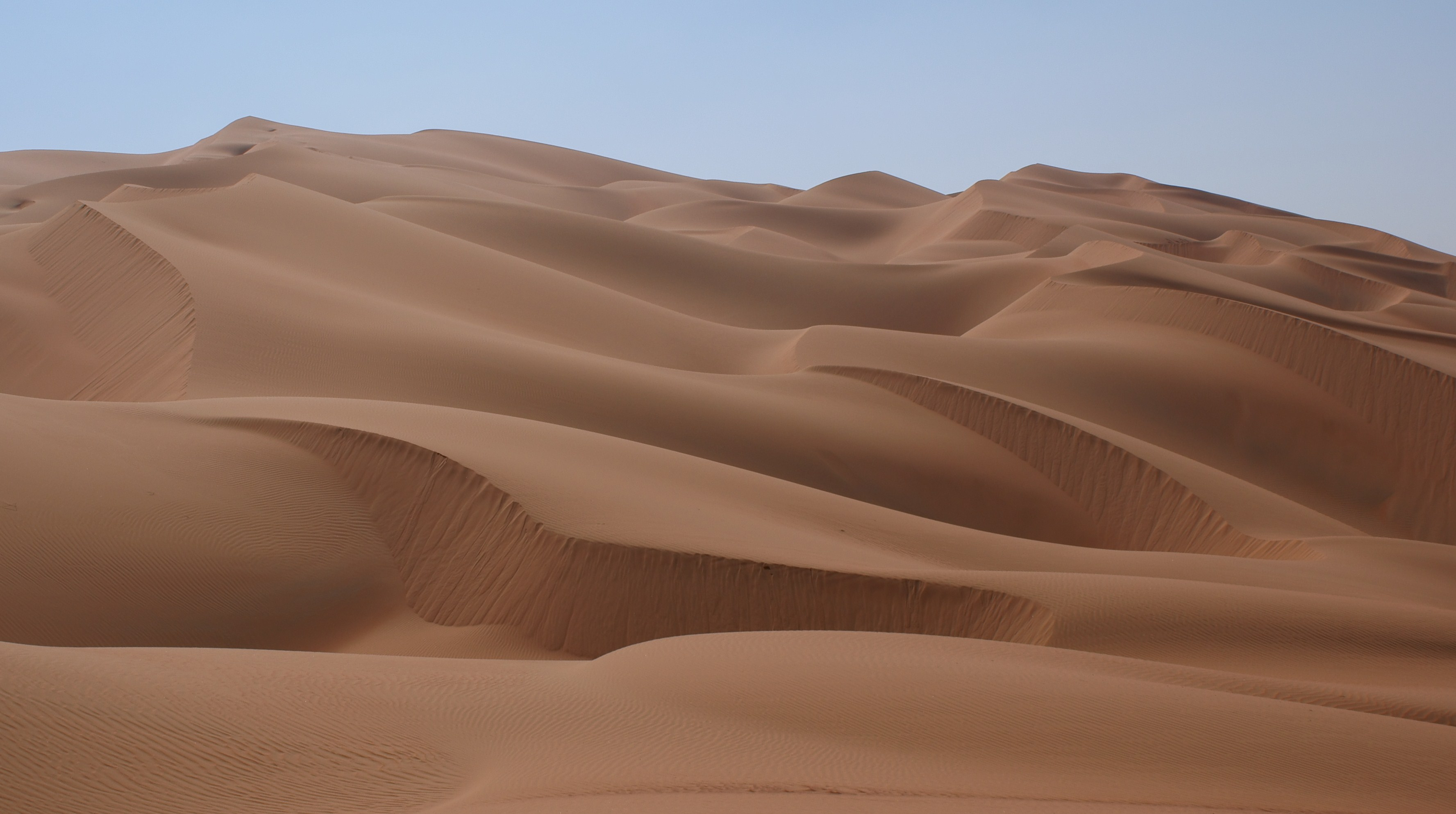
The Rub' al-Khali or Empty Quarter, comprises more than a third of the Eastern Province

Approximately two-thirds of the province is desert, comprising, from south to north, the Rub' al Khali, Dahna and Nafud deserts, with the Rub' al-Khali alone making up more than half of the area of the province. Areas such as Hafr al-Batin and the Al-Ahsa Oasis have become important sites for desert farming due to the advancements made during the Green Revolution in farming and irrigation techniques.

The entire eastern coast of the kingdom lies in the Eastern Province. The region borders, from north to south, the countries of Iraq, Kuwait, Bahrain, Qatar, United Arab Emirates, Oman, and Yemen.

== History ==
The Rashidun Caliphate expanded the Muslim world into three continents within 20 years of the death of Muhammad

The Eastern Province was home to the Dilmun civilization for several millennia which was an important trading center from the late 4th millennium BC to 800 BC. At the height of its power, Dilmun controlled the Persian Gulf trading routes. Dilmun was very prosperous during the first 300 years of the second millennium.

The Dilmun civilization was the centre of commercial activities linking traditional agriculture of the land—then utterly fertile due to artesian wells that have dried since, and due to a much wetter climate—with maritime trade between diverse regions such as the Meluhha (suspected to be Indus Valley Civilisation), Magan (Oman), and Mesopotamia. The Dilmun civilization is mentioned first in Sumerian cuneiform clay tablets dated to the late third millennium BC, found in the temple of goddess Inanna, in the city of Uruk. One of the earliest inscriptions mentioning Dilmun is that of king Ur-Nanshe of Lagash (c. 2300 BC) found in a door-socket: "The ships of Dilmun brought him wood as tribute from foreign lands."

The great commercial and trading connections between Mesopotamia and Dilmun were strong and profound to the point where Dilmun was a central figure to the Sumerian creation myth. Dilmun was described in the saga of Enki and Ninhursag as pre-existing in paradisiacal state, where predators don't kill, pain and diseases are absent, and people do not get old. Likewise the Sumerian tale of the garden paradise of Dilmun may have been an inspiration for the Garden of Eden story.

Dilmun's commercial power began to decline between 1000 BC and 800 BC because piracy flourished in the Persian Gulf. The most recent reference to Dilmun came during the Neo-Babylonian Empire. Neo-Babylonian administrative records, dated 567 BC, stated that Dilmun was controlled by the king of Babylon. The name of Dilmun fell from use after the collapse of Babylon in 538 BC.

The northern part of the Eastern Province later became inhabited by the Arab Lakhmids around 300 AD, with the coastal regions claimed by the Sasanians but governed by the Lakhmids. The entire Arabian Peninsula fell into Muslim hands during the Rashidun Caliphate and the Muslim conquest of Persia, after Muhammad's death. The region stayed stable during the first three Islamic caliphates.

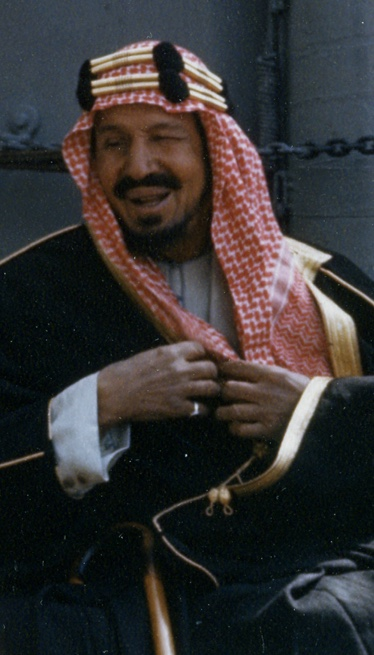
King Ibn Saud is largely accepted to be the founder of present-day Saudi Arabia, also known as the Third Saudi State

During the Abbasid Caliphate, the region was taken over by the Qarmatians, a Shia group of the Isma'ili branch, around 899 AD. The Qarmatians attacked Mecca and Medina in 930 AD and held the Black Stone to ransom in Ain Al Kuayba, Qatif. The region was ruled by the Qaramatians until 976 AD, when after losing to the Abbasids, they were reduced to the status of a local power. After Bahrain and Qatif seceded from Qarmatian rule around 1058 AD, they retreated to the Al-Ahsa Oasis, to which Abdullah bin Ali Al Uyuni laid siege and invaded in 1076 AD, ending the rule of Qarmatians in Ahsa and founding the Uyunid Emirate.

Not much is known of the Uyunids, except that they were the descendants of the Abd al-Qays tribe. They were involved in several internal disputes, causing the emirate to become unstable and eventually leading to the rise of the Bedouin Usfurids. The Usfurids saw a short period of stability. After overthrowing their former allies, the Uyunids, they had an uneasy relationship with the Persian rulers of Hormuz, who took control of the former Uyunid cities of Qatif and Bahrain around 1320 AD. This eventually led to the fall of the Usfurids. The region was mostly overlooked until the 1500s, when the Jabrids took over around 1507 AD, but they too fell due to internal conflicts in or around the 1540s.

In 1551 AD, the Ottomans invaded the region during their first war with the Safavids, and kept it under their control until 1671. After several years of unrest between the Ottomans, Saudis and Rashidis, the Emirate of Nejd and Hasa, also known as the Third Saudi State, under Ibn Saud, took the entire Arabian Peninsula from Ottoman and Rashidi control. Most of the Eastern Province came under the Hasa region, and as such, the emirate has been under Saudi control since 1902. In 1923, the Dawasir of Bahrain moved into the area which is now Khobar, and later spread into Dammam, and they are credited with the foundation of the two cities.

In the early 1990s, during the First Gulf war, Iraqi troops crossed the Kuwaiti-Saudi border and seized the town of Khafji. The US and Saudi Arabian armies were able to kick them out. This was known as the Battle of Khafji.

== Demographics ==
Population pyramid 2016
%	Males	Age	Females	%
0.17		80+		0.19
0.2		75–79		0.21
0.33		70–74		0.28
0.48		65–69		0.46
1.18		60–64		0.67
2.18		55–59		1.05
3.36		50–54		1.50
4.88		45–49		2.20
6.60		40–44		3.11
7.76		35–39		3.78
6.58		30–34		4.07
5.80		25–29		4.43
4.45		20–24		3.63
3.41		15–19		3.02
3.82		10–14		3.41
4.53		5–9		4.03
4.23		0–4		3.98

=== Population ===
According to the Population Characteristics Surveys conducted by the General Authority for Statistics, the Eastern Province had a population of 4,900,325 as of December 2017, of which 3,140,362 were Saudis and 1,759,963 were foreign nationals. The Eastern Province is the third most populous province in Saudi Arabia, after Mecca Province and Riyadh Province. With an estimated population of 1,225,000 as of 2019, Dammam is the most populous city in the province and the sixth most populous city in the country. The governorate with the largest population is the Al-Ahsa Governorate. It is also the largest governorate in terms of land area. The province had the lowest dependency ratio in the kingdom at around 36%, as of 2016. The sex ratio for Saudis was 109 males per 100 females and 150 males per 100 females for non-Saudis, yielding a common sex ratio of 151 males per 100 females. 1% of children in the province were orphans.

=== Religion ===
The local Saudi population is entirely Muslim, with the majority being Sunni Muslims. Shia constitute a large minority, concentrated especially in Qatif and Al-Ahsa governorates. Common religions among non-Saudis are Islam, Hinduism, and Christianity.

=== Languages ===
The official language of Saudi Arabia is Arabic. The standard spoken dialect in the Eastern Province is a variant of Najdi Arabic, similar to the urban Najdi spoken in Riyadh, but influenced by other dialects local to the Eastern Province. Other dialects spoken natively in the Eastern Province include:

1. Gulf Arabic dialects, spoken by approximately 2 million people, including Hasawi variants, Bahraini variants, and others.
2. Baharna dialects spoken in Qatif.
3. Najdi-type dialects spoken among settled bedouin tribes. This includes Central Najdi dialects such as the dialects of Bani Khalid, Southern dialects such as the dialects of Al Murrah and Ajman, and Mixed Northern-Central Najdi dialects such as dialects of Al-Dhafeer.

There are also many dialects spoken by Saudis who have immigrated from elsewhere, such as other Najdi dialects, South Arabian dialects, and Hejazi dialects. The Mehri language is also spoken by Mehri Saudis. Saudi Sign Language is the principal language of the deaf community.

The large expatriate communities also speak their own languages, the most numerous of which are some of the Indian languages, Filipino/Tagalog, Bengali, Urdu, as well as Arabic dialects such as Egyptian, Levantine, and Yemeni.

=== Education ===
As of 2016, of the 1,264,687 male residents aged over 10, 88.78%—representing 1,122,738 individuals—had received some form of formal education. Among females, 80.77% of the 1,161,677 residents over the age of 10—equivalent to 938,233 individuals—were formally educated.

=== Housing ===
As of 2016, 44.42% of residential units in the Eastern Province were apartments, and 96.29% were built with concrete. No cases of homelessness were officially recorded.

=== Health ===
As of 2016, 3.51% of the province's Saudi residents aged 15 and over reported some form of disability, with visual impairment being the most commonly reported type, affecting 42,052 individuals. 58,000 persons reported severe or extreme disability. 285,754 Saudi residents above the age of 15 reported that they were regularly smoking, with 254,233 reporting daily smoking and 31,521 reporting intermittent smoking.

== Economy ==
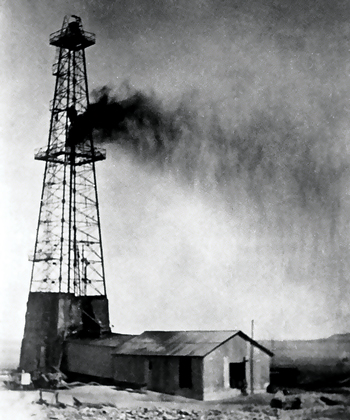
Dammam No. 7, the first well to produce commercial quantities of oil in Saudi Arabia

The economy of the Kingdom of Saudi Arabia is largely dependent on oil. As such, the Eastern Province, being the province with most of Saudi Arabia's oil reserves enjoys a high economic position. Saudi Aramco, the state-owned oil company of Saudi Arabia and an organization of major significance in the petroleum industry, is based in Dhahran in the Dammam metropolitan area. It became the fifth company in the world to reach a market capitalization of $1 trillion ($1,000,000,000,000) on December 11, 2019. After going public the same day in what is considered the largest Initial public offering ever as of December 2019, the next day, on December 12, 2019, the company reached a market cap of $2 trillion, becoming the first and only company in the world to break the record.

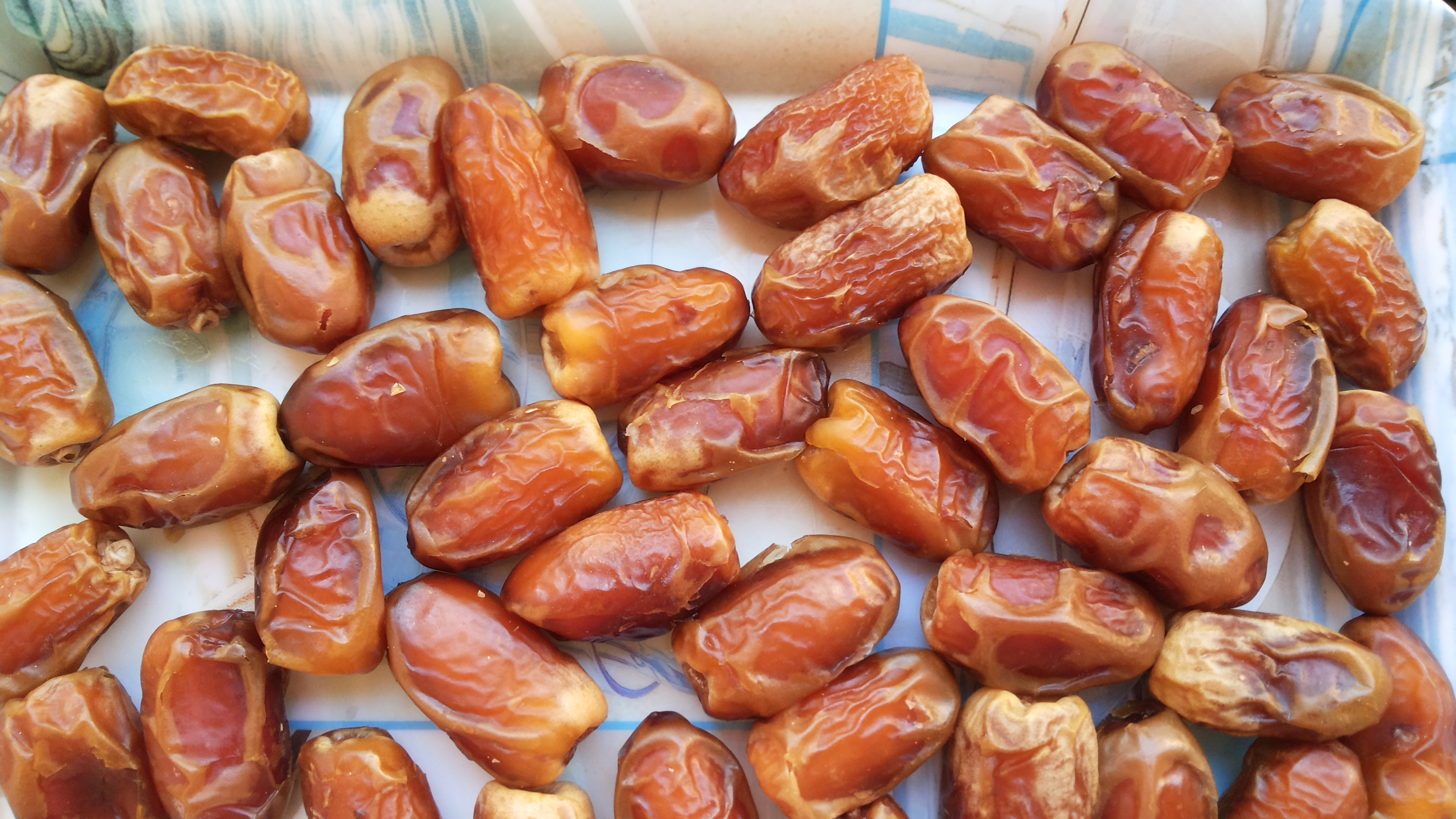
Saudi Arabian Saga'i dates

The kingdom's main oil and gas fields are located in the Eastern Province with sites such as the Ghawar Field, the largest onshore oil field in the world and the Safaniya oil field, the largest Offshore drilling field in the world. Petroleum is refined in various refineries spread across the kingdom and shipped to dozens of countries from port cities such as Ras Tanura. The East–West pipeline enables efficient transport of oil from the eastern oil fields and refineries to the western refineries and ports, such as Rabigh and Jeddah.

Saudi Arabia's largest agricultural product, dates, also forms a large part of the province's economy. Every year thousands of tonnes of dates are harvested from the date palms in the giant oasis of Al-Ahsa Oasis to be sold in and around the kingdom.

== Transportation ==
=== Air ===
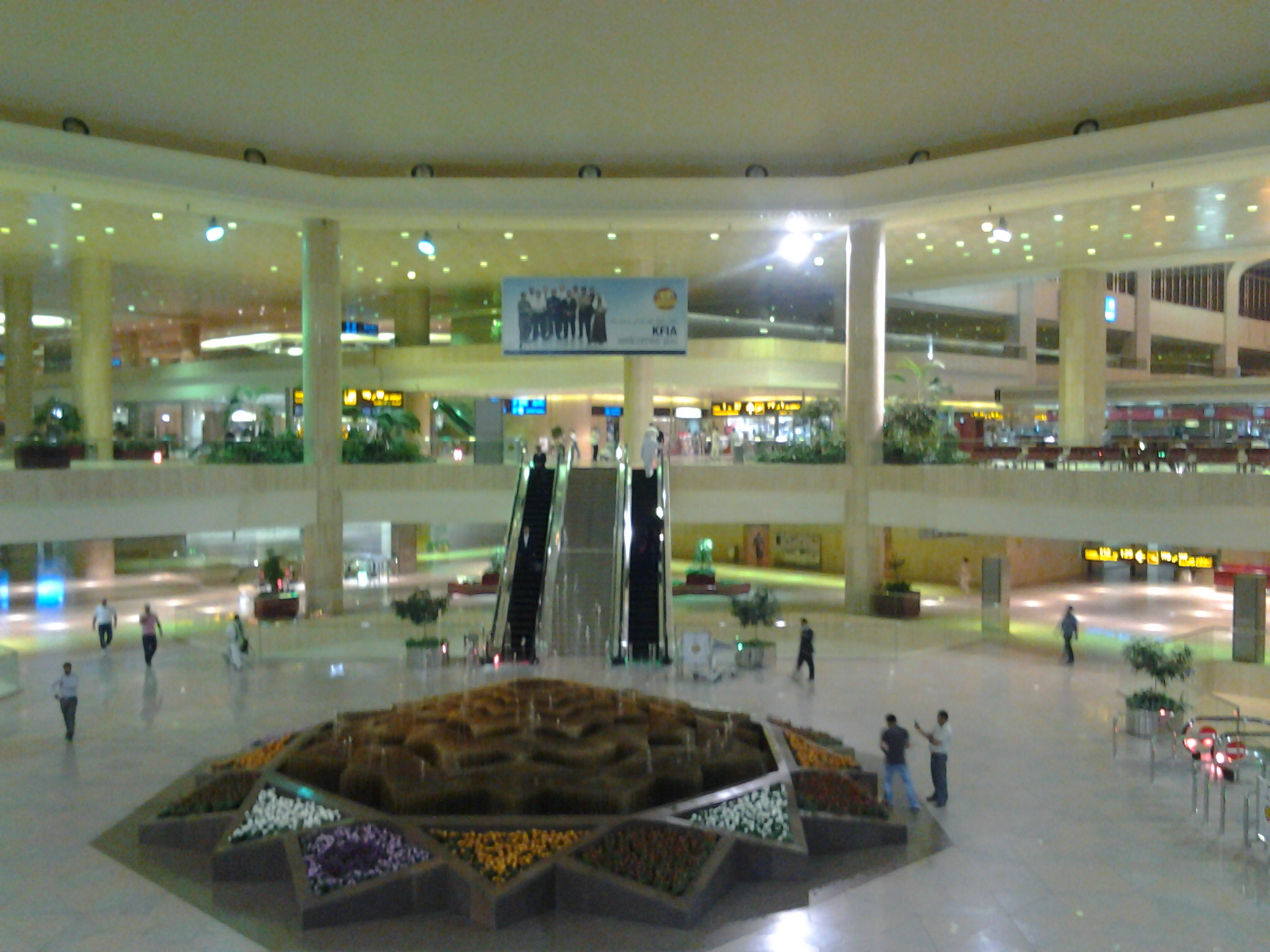
Inside King Fahd International Airport

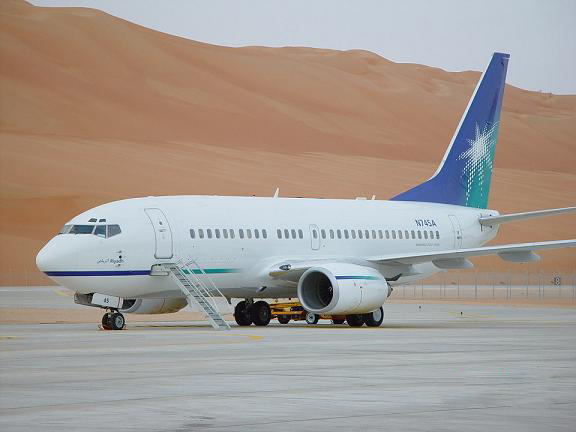
A Saudi Aramco aircraft at Shaybah Airport in Shaybah

Dammam's King Fahd International Airport, operating since October 1999, the largest airport in the world in terms of land area, serves as the primary hub for the entirety of the Eastern Province. Located 30 km northwest of the city, the airport is well connected by air to 43 destinations in the Middle East, Asia, and Europe, provided by 37 airlines. Other airports in the province include Al-Ahsa International Airport and Qaisumah–Hafar Al-Batin International Airport. Saudi Aramco has a separate terminal at the King Fahd International Airport for their employees and aircraft with scheduled flights to Shaybah, Yanbu, Jeddah and other sites where the company is active.

=== Sea ===
Built in the 1940s, the King Abdulaziz Port, located on the coast of the Persian Gulf, is the second largest and second busiest port in Saudi Arabia, after the Jeddah Islamic Port in Jeddah. It is also the largest port in the Persian Gulf. The port is equipped with 9 ports with 214 platforms. The port receives more than 15,000 ships carrying more than 13 million containers or 532 million tons of cargo annually.

=== Roads ===
Highway 95 (Route 5M) connects Khafji on the Kuwaiti border in the north to the Ramlah border station on the Omani border in the south via Jubail, Ras Tanura, the Dammam metropolitan area, the Salwa border station on the Qatari border and the Batha' border station with the United Arab Emirates. Highway 40 (Route 80M) connects Bahrain and Dammam via the 25 km (15 mi) King Fahd Causeway over the Persian Gulf and onward to Jeddah on the Red Sea via Riyadh, Taif and Mecca. Highways 605, 610, 613, 614, 615, 617 and 619, known locally by other popular names, connect the Dammam metropolitan to Ras Tanura, Jubail, the King Fahd International Airport, Abqaiq and Hofuf.

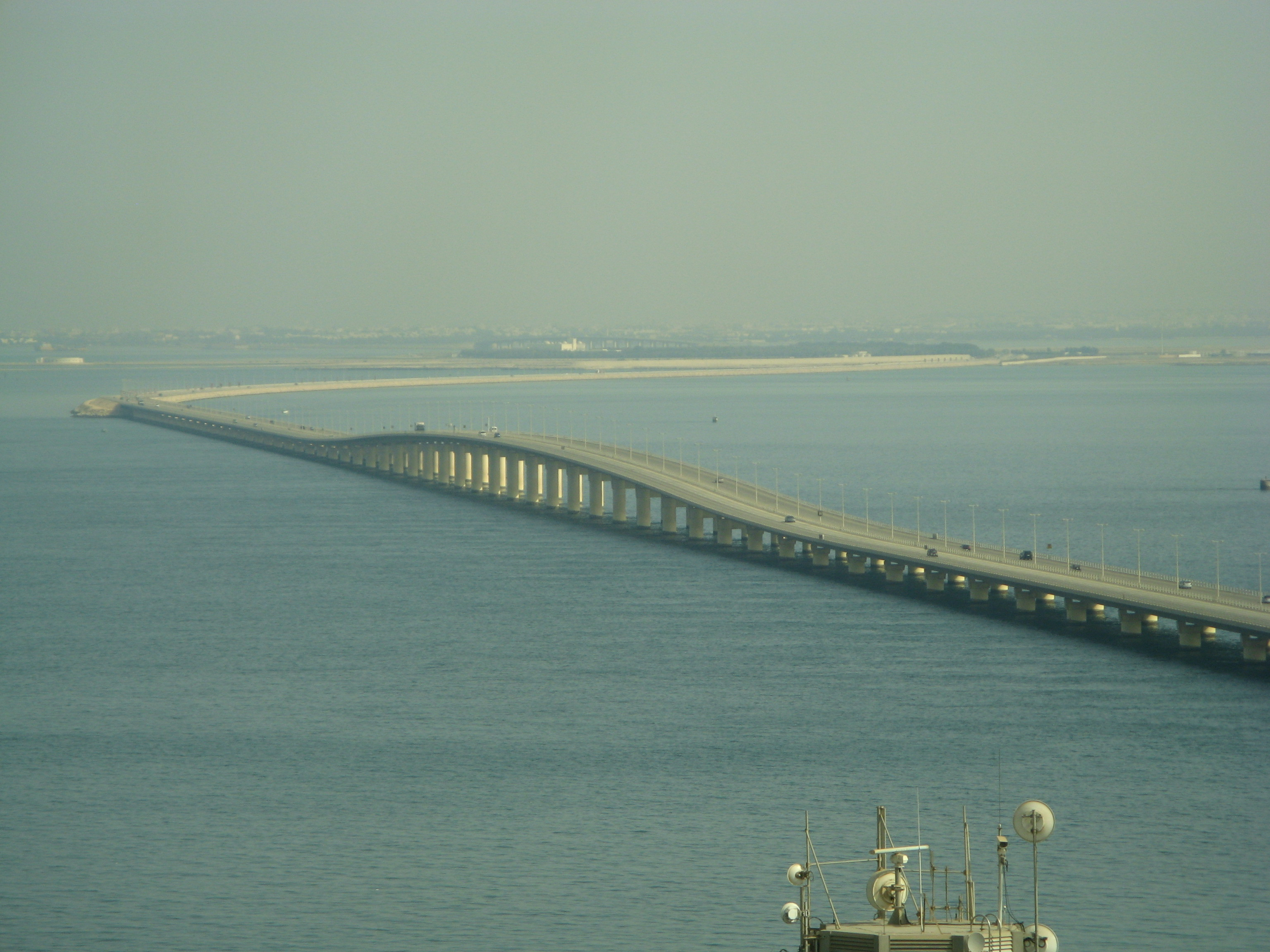
The 25 km (15 mi) King Fahd Causeway connects Bahrain to Saudi Arabia

Intercity bus services are operated in the province by the Saudi Public Transport Company. Umrah and Hajj shuttle services are also provided to residents of the kingdom by private contractors. Shuttle services also connect the Dammam metropolitan area to the Bahrain International Airport, northeast of Manama in Bahrain.

=== Railway ===
There is two lines in the Eastern Province, the Dammam–Riyadh line a passenger line, which runs from Dammam to Riyadh via Abqaiq and Hofuf, and the other freight, which runs directly from Dammam to Riyadh, are managed by Saudi Arabia Railways.

=== Metro ===
A plan to build a Metro in Dammam was also in the works, but its current status is unknown.

== Governorates ==
The Eastern Province consists of 12 governorates classified into two categories: 5 governorates in Category A and 7 in Category B. These categories are based primarily on the level of services and infrastructure available in each governorate. With Dammam serving as the seat city of the province, Dammam had a population of 1,386,671 as of 2022.

Seat
Governorate (A)
Governorate (B)

#	Governorate	2010 Population	2022 Population
–	Dammam	–	1,386,671
1	Al-Ahsa	–	1,104,267
2	Khobar	573,671	658,550
3	Qatif	524,417	552,442
4	Jubail	392,948	505,162
5	Hafar al-Batin	387,102	467,007
6	Khafji	77,328	84,316
7	Ras Tanura	62,069	62,314
8	Nariyah	52,403	52,340
9	Abqaiq	52,849	45,032
10	Qaryat al-Ulya	25,062	24,634
11	Al-Udeid	–	8,635
12	Al-Bayda	–	N/A

== List of governors ==
Name	Term of Office	Monarch(s)
Office established
Abdullah bin Jalawi	1913 – 1938	Abdulaziz
Saud bin Abdullah	1938 – 1967	Abdulaziz, Saud, Faisal
Abdul Mohsen bin Abdullah	1967 – 1985	Faisal, Khalid, Fahd
Muhammad bin Fahd	1985 – 2013	Fahd, Abdullah
Saud bin Nayef	2013 – present	Abdullah, Salman

== See also ==
- Provinces of Saudi Arabia
- List of governorates of Saudi Arabia
- List of cities and towns in Saudi Arabia
- Eastern Arabia
- Shia Islam in Saudi Arabia
