= 2023–2025 world oil market chronology =

Events affecting the oil market

In 2023, the first two quarters saw declines, though concerns over U.S. interest rates have kept oil from rising as much as it could have. Oil then rose for seven straight weeks to a nine-month high and then rose and fell before seven weeks of declines.

== 2023 ==
Both Brent and WTI started the year down more than 8 percent, the most for a first week since 2016. Brent finished at $78.57 and WTI at $73.77, after gaining 13 percent in the previous three weeks. U.S. jobs news indicated the economy was slowing, meaning less chance of another large interest rate increase, and the dollar jumped. The price of Saudi light crude sold to Asia fell to the lowest since November 2021. Oil rose for the next two weeks, with Brent ending at $87.63 and WTI at $81.31, with loosening of restrictions in China a big reason, along with expectation of smaller interest rate increases. A lower oil rig count and the Russian cap also contributed, though U.S. crude inventories were the highest since June 2021. For the week ending February 3, oil fell nearly 8 percent, with Brent at one point reaching $79.72, lowest since January 11, and WTI reaching $73.13, lowest since January 5. Both fell about 3 percent on February 3 with positive U.S. jobs news causing concerns about interest rate increases, even though the Federal Reserve raised rates less than it had been. The next week oil rose over 8 percent, with Brent finishing at $86.39 and WTI at $79.72, as Russia announced production cuts. The European Union's cap and its ban on Russian oil were believed to have had influence, but gains were limited by low Chinese demand, increased U.S. unemployment claims and high inventories. Positive U.S. economic news, higher U.S stockpiles and lower stock prices helped oil fall for a second week, with Brent hitting $84.18 and WTI at $77.52. In spite of higher U.S. inventories, because of Russia's plans to decrease output, WTI climbed 2 percent to $75.39 on February 23 after falling for 6 straight days. Brent finished at $82.21, also up 2 percent. At the end of February, U.S. crude exports reached a record due to the growing gap between WTI and Brent.

In the first full week of March, oil fell 3 percent due to concerns about U.S. and European interest rates, though not as much as it could have due to good U.S. economic news, with Brent finishing at $82.68 and WTI at $76.68. The next week, as a result of the March 2023 United States bank failures, Brent fell almost 12 percent to $72.97 a barrel, the most since December, and WTI fell 13 percent to $66.74, the most in a year. Declines continued until both indexes reached their lowest point since 2021. The first quarter ended with the second week of gains, with lower supplies in some areas and U.S. inflation decreasing. Brent finished with the more actively traded futures at $79.89 down 5 percent for the month and WTI was up 9 percent for the week, but down 2 percent for the month, to $75.67.

OPEC and others planned to decrease production, which caused prices to jump 6 percent April 3, but on April 5 there was little change with Brent finishing at $84.69 and WTI at $80.61 in spite of falling U.S. inventories, as U.S. job openings reached the lowest level in almost two years. The week ending April 14 marked the fourth week of increases with Brent finishing up 1.5 percent for the week at $86.36 and WTI up 2.5 percent to $82.52. Factors included, unexpected production cuts by OPEC and others along with an International Energy Agency forecast of higher demand, as well as less concern about U.S. banks and a lower U.S. rig count. Despite good economic news from Europe, Brent finished down 5 percent at $81.80 and WTI fell 6 percent to $78.55, with interest rate fears and higher U.S. unemployment claims as major factors. At the end of the fourth straight down month and the second week of declines, Brent finished at $80.33, while WTI finished up for the month for the first time in six months at $76.78. Recession fears and concern over banks outweighed the lowest U.S. crude production since November and the highest demand for fuel since December.

The first week of May was the third down week, which had not happened since November, due to concerns about U.S. banks and another interest rate increase. Brent finished at $75.30 and WTI, after reaching levels not seen since 2021, rebounded to $71.34. Oil fell again the next week, with Brent finishing at $74.17 and WTI at $70.04, with a strong dollar and concerns about the U.S. debt ceiling as major factors, plus fears of a recession and its effect on demand. The next two weeks, oil went up, with Brent finishing May 26 at $76.95 and WTI at $72.67, with the possibility of a solution to the U.S. debt crisis cancelling out concern that OPEC and others would not continue production cuts. Slow growth in Europe and the possibility of the European Central Bank raising interest rates limited gains.

On June 1, with the U.S. debt ceiling deal passed by the House, WTI went up the most in one day in nearly a month to finish at $70.10, and Brent rose to $74.65 after its biggest gain in two weeks. This cancelled out the effect of rising U.S. inventories. The first full week of June ended with the second week of lower prices, with Brent finishing at $74.79 and WTI at $70.17. Increases caused by plans by Saudi Arabia, OPEC and other nations to decrease output were cancelled out by several factors. The announcement of a likely nuclear deal with Iran, which was not confirmed, but if it happened would increase supply. U.S. stocks rose, and negative economic news from China added to losses. The next week prices went up due to high demand in China and cuts by OPEC and others, cancelling out concerns over the world economy and interest rate increases in England and Europe. Brent finished at $76.61 and WTI at $71.78. On June 22 oil fell 4 percent due to a large Bank of England rate hike after oil went up with high crop prices suggesting lower biofuel demand leading to higher oil demand. Brent finished the day at $74.14 and WTI was $69.51. Because of negative economic news worldwide and the prospect of lower demand, oil finished down for the fourth straight quarter, with Brent ending second quarter 2023 at $74.90, down 6 percent, and WTI at $70.64, down 6.5 percent. Higher demand, lower inflation and less chance of interest rates increasing in the U.S., along with production cuts planned by OPEC and others, helped oil finish slightly higher.

For the first week of July, oil rose 5 percent, with Brent finishing at $78.47, highest since May 1, and WTI at $73.86, highest since May 24. Saudi Arabia and Russia announced cuts, the U.S. dollar fell, and the U.S. jobs report was not as positive as expected. These factors outweighed continued concerns over interest rates. The next week, with supply problems in Libya and Nigeria, oil rose for the third week in a row even though a stronger dollar caused a decline on July 14. Brent finished at $79.87 and WTI at $75.42. WTI increased 2 percent for the week the next week for its fourth gain, ending at $77.07, the highest since April 25, while Brent finished at $81.07. Reasons included lower supplies and the chance of more problems in the Russo-Ukrainian War. With the expectation that the U.S. Federal Reserve and the European Central Bank were nearly finished raising interest rates, and supply cuts from OPEC and others, oil rose for the fifth week, up almost 5 percent, and close to 13 percent for the month. Brent finished at $84.99 and WTI at $80.58. Good economic news from the U.S. also contributed. Brent finished July at $85.43 and WTI at $81.80, both the highest since April for the third day, and the biggest increase for a month since January 2022, with expectations of lower supply and higher demand.

After six weeks of gains, WTI was up 20 percent to $82.82 on August 4, and Brent finished at $86.24, up 17 percent. Saudi Arabia agreed to continue production cuts, while Russia was reducing exports, while demand was expected to increase. The seventh up week marked the longest streak since 2022. Brent finished at $86.81 and WTI at $83.19, with the International Energy Agency reporting record demand for June and OPEC forecasting higher demand for the rest of the year along with the production cuts. After two weeks of declines, continuation of production cuts by Saudi Arabia and lower exports by Russia led to oil reaching its highest level in over six months. Brent finished on September 1 up 4.8 percent for the week, the most since July, at $88.49. WTI finished the week up 7.2 percent, the most since March, at $85.02.

Oil finished the first full week of September at a nine-month high. Brent ended September 8 at $90.65, highest since November, with WTI at $87.51. WTI reached $95.03, highest since August 2022, and Brent peaked at $97.69, highest since August 2022, due to low supplies, before falling due to profit taking on September 28. Gas peaked at $3.88 on September 18.

During the first full week of October, both WTI and Brent fell by the largest percentage for a two-day period since May, with the decline on the first of those days the most in more than a year. WTI ended October 5 at $82.31 and Brent at $84.07. Continuation of production cuts failed to overcome investor perception that a time of high demand was ending. U.S. gasoline demand was down and finished motor gasoline supplied was at its lowest point of 2023. Another concern was high interest rates, and positive U.S. economic news raised the possibility of another U.S. interest rate increase. The week ended with the largest decline since March, with Brent down 11 percent and WTI down more than 8 percent. The next week Brent was up 7.5 percent, the most for a week since February, finishing at $90.89, while WTI ended at $87.69. Both gained the most for a day since April on October 13, with both climbing nearly 6 percent after fears the Gaza war could worsen and sanctions on some tankers carrying oil from Russia. Oil climbed again the next week but fell after Hamas released hostages. Brent finished at $92.89 and WTI at $88.75. Brent fell 2 percent and WTI 4 percent the next week, with the premium for Brent the highest since March. After rising nearly 3 percent on October 27 due to U.S. attacks on Syria, Brent finished at $90.48 and WTI at $85.54. The first full week of November was the third down week, the first time this happened since May, with Brent finishing at $81.43 and WTI at $77.17. Lower demand was expected due to negative economic news from China, the UK and the US. The day after oil fell nearly 5 percent to a four-month low, the fourth down week finished with Brent at $80.61 and WTI at $75.89 as a result of continued bad news from China, high U.S. inventories and record production, with sanctions on Russian oil shipments causing prices to increase.

OPEC and others agreed to production cuts on November 30 but traders doubted these would actually happen. Negative economic news in the U.S. and worldwide contributed to another down week. The first full week of December was the seventh week of declines, the longest streak since 2018, with Brent finishing at $75.18 and WTI at $71.23. Both dropped nearly 4 percent for the week and reaching their lowest point since June on December 7, the sixth straight decline. Traders believed supply was too high and Chinese imports fell due to high inventories and negative economic news. Despite a fall in prices due to negative economic news leading to expectations of lower demand, oil rose the next week for the first time in two months, with Brent finishing at $76.55 and WTI at $71.43. Also contributing to lower prices was a prediction of lower interest rates. Good U.S. economic news and Houthi attacks on ships helped oil increase for a second week, with Brent finishing at $79.07 and WTI at $73.56. After a 2 percent rise on December 26 due to that attacks and anticipation of U.S. interest rate cuts, oil fell 2 percent on December 27 and 3 percent December 28 with Red Sea shipping resuming. Brent finished at $77.15 and WTI finished at $71.77. Further drops resulted from U.S. gulf refiners clearing inventories to avoid storage taxes. Gas ended the year at $3.11, the lowest for the end of the year since 2020.

== 2024 ==
Oil rose for the first week of 2024 due to the Israel-Hamas War threatening to become a larger conflict, and positive U.S. economic news. Brent finished at $78.76 and WTI at $73.81. Continuing Houthi attacks disrupted oil trading and increased costs, driving up oil prices. Brent finished January at $80.55 and WTI at $75.85.

For the first full week of February, oil jumped 6 percent after a 7 percent fall the previous week, due to concerns about oil supplies from the Middle East and less chance of a cease-fire in the Israel-Hamas war. Brent finished at $82.19 and WTI at $76.84. WTI began March up 4.5 percent for the week to $79.97 with Brent up 2.4 percent to $83.55, with the expectations of continued production cuts by OPEC and others a major reason. Actions by Houthis also contributed. Two weeks later oil ended the week up more than 3 percent as Brent went over $85 for the first time since November, finishing at $85.33, with WTI at $81.09. Higher demand with lower U.S. stockpiles and Ukrainian attacks on Russian refineries accompanied an increase in U.S. oil rigs and a stronger dollar. In the final week of March, Brent was up 2.4 percent to $87.48, the highest since October, and WTI rose 3.2 percent to $83.17. Fourth quarter 2023 U.S. economic growth was more than expected, and inflation data made lower interest rates less likely until late in the year. Higher U.S. oil and gasoline inventories were still less than expected and the rig count was down. Late in April, positive U.S. economic news and concerns about the Middle East war helped oil to rise, with Brent finishing April 25 at $89.01 and WTI at $83.57. U.S. growth had been shown to be slowing, gasoline stockpiles fell less than expected, and U.S crude inventories fell.

On May 17, oil finished up for the week for the first time in three weeks, with Brent at $83.98, up 1 percent, and WTI at $80.06, up 2 percent. Lower inventories and positive economic news from the U.S. and China made higher demand appear more likely. Continuation of U.S. Federal Reserve policy helped prices fall the next week, though they rose to end the week due to positive U.S. economic news, with Brent finishing at $82.12 and WTI at $77.72. During the final week of May, oil fell for two days in a row, with low demand and high stockpiles in the United States. Brent finished May 30 at $81.86 and WTI at $77.91. The first week of June was the third down week for oil, with Brent finishing down 2.5 percent for the week of June 7 at $79.62 and WTI down 1.9 percent to $75.53. Positive U.S. economic news suggested a delay in reducing U.S. interest rates, while the European Central Bank did lower rates for the first time since 2019. Chinese imports were lower even though exports were up. OPEC and others met and indicated willingness to stop production increases. The next week oil jumped 4 percent with Brent finishing at $82.62 and WTI at $78.54, with high demand forecasts a big reason, despite lower confidence in the U.S. economy by consumers. On June 20, Brent reached $85.89, highest since May 1 after U.S. crude inventories fell and a U.S. jobs report made cutting interest rates more likely. Oil finished June up 6 percent, with WTI finishing at $81.54. The next week, Brent reached $87.55, the highest since April, and WTI closed at $83.88, highest in 11 weeks. U.S. crude stocks were down, the dollar was weak and high U.S. demand was forecast. The next week Brent was down nearly 2 percent to $85.03 after going up for four weeks. WTI fell more than 1 percent to $82.21. While demand for gasoline was high, a negative economic report from the U.S. did not change expectations for lower interest rates in the future.

On July 19 oil closed at the lowest level since mid-June after Brent fell nearly 3 percent to $82.63, and WTI fell more than 3 percent to $80.13 with a stronger dollar and a likely ceasefire in the Israel–Hamas war. Positive U.S. and Chinese economic news helped oil rise in the first full week of August, with Brent gaining 3.5 percent to finish August 9 at $79.66 and WTI up more than 4 percent to $76.84. U.S. jobless claims fell, U.S. interest rates appeared likely to decrease, and Chinese inflation was higher than expected. Increased likelihood of Iranian attacks on Israel, and continued attacks by Houthis, also contributed. Bad economic news from China led to a nearly 2 percent drop in oil prices August 16, though there was little change for the week after prices rose earlier due to fears of a worsening situation in the Middle East. During the next week, Brent and WTI fell to their lowest levels since January after a pessimistic forecast for U.S. job growth. On August 23 both jumped over 2 percent, Brent closing at $79.02 and WTI at $74.83. The U.S. Federal Reserve chair indicated rates were going down. Closing of Libya oil fields caused oil to jump to the highest point in two weeks on August 26. However, oil fell later in the week and Brent ended the month at $78.80, down 2.4 percent, and WTI finished August down 3.6 percent to $73.55. OPEC and others planned to increase production in October, and good U.S. economic news also contributed.

The first week of September ended with Brent down 10 percent for the week to $71.06, its lowest since December 2021, and WTI down 8 percent to $67.67, lowest since June 2023. Negative U.S. jobs news cancelled out a promise by OPEC and others to postpone production increases, and lower U.S. stockpiles. Gas was $3.25 on September 11. However, on the same day, despite an increase in crude inventories, oil jumped due to the chance Hurricane Francine would interrupt production. Brent finished at $70.61 and WTI at $67.31.

After the U.S. Federal Reserve reduced interest rates September 18, Brent fell to $73.65 and WTI fell to $70.91, but lower U.S. inventories and the possibility of Mideast violence kept the decline from being greater. After sources said OPEC and other nations would increase production and China's central bank also reduced interest rates, Brent fell 3 percent to $71.89 for the final week of September and WTI fell 5 percent to $68.18.

The next week due to concerns about possible war in the Middle East, Brent rose 8 percent, the most in a week since January 2023, to $78.05. WTI finished up 9 percent, the most since March 2023, at $74.03. On October 8, oil fell more than 4 percent with expectations of a cease-fire between Israel and Hezbollah. Brent fell from above $390, the highest since August, to $77.18, and WTI finished at $73.57. The next week, slower economic growth in China and Middle East uncertainty contributed to the biggest decline for a week since September 2. Brent fell over 7 percent to $73.06 while WTI dropped 8 percent to $69.22. Oil went up about 4 percent in the fourth week of October with Brent finishing at $76.05 and WTI at $71.78. Prices were moving back and forth due to uncertainty in the Middle East, and the U.S. election and other elections. After oil fell more than 6 percent October 28 due to less fear of more trouble in the Middle East, WTI finished October at $70.76 and Brent ended the month at $74.26. Oil jumped the last day of the month due to new fears of actions by Iran and possible delays in increased output.

Lower Chinese demand and the chance of fewer U.S. interest rate cuts contributed to oil falling 2 percent on November 15. With demand worldwide down, Brent finished the week down 4 percent to $71.04 with WTI down 5 percent to $67.02. The Ukraine War contributed to oil rising 6 percent for the week, with Brent finishing at $75.17 and WTI at $71.24. After a ceasefire in the Israel-Hezbollah conflict, Brent finished the next week down 3 percent to $72.94 and WTI fell nearly 5 percent to $68. For the first week of December, Brent fell 2.5 percent to $71.12 and WTI was down just over 1 percent to $67.20. Although OPEC and others delayed production increases. worldwide demand decreased, especially in China, and U.S. production rose. The next week, Brent rose 5 percent to $74.49 and WTI was up 6 percent to $71.29, the highest since November 7. Expected sanctions against Russia and Iran, Middle East troubles and an expected U.S. interest rate cut were major reasons. Oil fell more than 2 percent in the third week of December with Brent finishing at $72.57 and WTI at $69.12 due to concerns about whether Chinese demand was expected to increase.

At Christmas, gas was $3.04, four cents less than a year earlier, and one of the lowest prices since the COVID-19 pandemic.

Brent ended 2024 down 3 percent, the second down year. Brent finished at $74.64 and WTI at $71.72, about where it started 2024.

== 2025 ==
The second full week of 2025 was the fourth week that the price of oil increased, with Brent finishing up 1.3 percent at $80.79 and WTI up 1.7 percent to $77.88. Sanctions on Russia were the most important factor. The Gaza ceasefire made further Houthi attacks on shipping less likely. Higher demand expectations and lower U.S. inflation also contributed. The next week Brent was down nearly 3 percent to $78.50 while WTI fell about 4 percent to finish at $74.66 after Donald Trump became President of the United States and told OPEC to lower prices while saying U.S. production would increase.

As a result of Trump's tariffs on China, WTI fell to its lowest point since late December on February 4 before recovering due to Trump's "maximum pressure" on Iran, ending the day at $72.70. Oil increased nearly 4 percent over three days preceding February 12. On that day, oil fell more than 2 percent, despite higher U.S. inflation, due to the prospect of peace between Russia and Ukraine improving oil supplies. Also, U.S. crude stocks increased. Brent finished the day at $75.18 and WTI at $71.37. At that time, gas was $3.14, up from $3.06.

Oil ended February down for the month for the first time since November. With Iraq exporting Kurdistan oil again and the U.S. tariffs taking effect, Brent finished at $73.18 and WTI at $69.76. The next week, after reaching its lowest point since December 2021 on March 5, Brent fell nearly 4 percent to $70.36, the most since November, and WTI fell nearly 4 percent to $67.04. OPEC and others were planning to increase output, and U.S. crude inventories were up. Possible sanctions on Russia and uncertainty about Trump's policies kept oil from falling further than it did.

Sanctions on Iran and more Middle East troubles helped oil go higher March 20 despite a strong dollar. Brent finished at $72 and WTI at $68.26. On March 26, oil jumped 1 percent to the highest level in a month, with additional U.S. tariffs a major reason, and U.S. crude supplies tight. Brent finished the next day at $74.03 with WTI at $69.92.

On April 3 oil fell more than 6 percent, the most since 2022, with Brent ending at $70.34 and WTI at $66.95 as OPEC and others agreed to increase production, though much of the decrease resulted from concerns over Trump's tariffs. Brent finished April 11 at $64.76 and WTI was at $61.50, both up $1 because of the potential for restrictions on exports from Iran. This followed a week of "volatile price swings" resulting from Trump's tariff policies. On April 16 oil increased 2 percent and Brent finished at $65.85 and WTI at $62.47 due to concerns about sanctions on Iran exporting oil to China. Predictions of too much oil after planned production increases by OPEC and others and a possible end to the Ukraine War, and uncertainty about tariffs on China, contributed to a loss for the week ending April 25. Brent fell nearly 2 percent to $66.87 and WTI dropped more than 2 percent to finish at $63.02. WTI finished April at $58.21, the lowest since November 2021, down 18 percent. Brent finished at $63.12, down 5 percent. Both were the largest drops for a month since November 2021. Saudi Arabia did not intend to reduce supplies. Trump's tariff policies threatened to reduce demand, and other factors included negative first quarter economic news from the U.S. as well as concerns about the worldwide economy. In the first full week of May, oil rose more than 4 percent for the week due to a U.S. trade deal with the United Kingdom and expectations of positive developments in the relationship between the U.S. and China. Middle East tensions were also a factor. Brent finished at $63.91 with WTI at $61.02. The next week was the second week of increases after an improvement in the relations between U.S. and China, with Brent finishing at $65.41 and WTI at $62.49. This was despite a 2 percent decrease on May 15 due to the chance of a deal with Iran. Oil fell over 2 percent the next week, with Brent finishing at $64.78 and WTI at $61.53. Concerns about a deal with Iran on nuclear weapons kept oil from falling further. Then oil finished May down another 1 percent with Brent at $63.90 and WTI at $60.79, with the expectation that OPEC and others would increase production, along with a worldwide surplus.

In the first week of June, WTI jumped nearly 5 percent to $64.58 due to the U.S. rig count falling to the lowest since 2021, a good U.S. economic report, and the 2025 Canadian wildfires. Brent rose less than 3 percent to $66.47 with gains limited by increased production by OPEC and others. The difference between WTI and Brent was $2.78, the lowest since September 2023.

On June 13 as a result of Israeli strikes on Iran, oil jumped 7 percent. Brent finished up 12.5 percent for the week at $74.23 and WTI climbed 13 percent to $77.62. Although prices fell due to the likelihood of diplomatic solutions to the Iran crisis, they did rise for the week, with Brent finishing at $77.01 and WTI at $74.93. Much of the increase happened as a result of more Israeli strikes. On June 23, oil prices were below $70 again (7% lower than on June 20), indicating that the oil market viewed the 2025 United States strikes on Iranian nuclear sites, and Iran's response missile attack on US bases in Qatar, and the Strait of Hormuz remaining open), as inconsequential.

The first week in July ended with Brent up less than 1 percent for the week to $68.30 and WTI up 1.5 percent to $66.30. Investors were waiting on expected actions by OPEC, and the effects of the One Big Beautiful Bill Act. Expected nuclear talks with Iran also played a role. The next week Brent jumped 3 percent to $70.36 and WRI rose just over 2 percent to $68.45 due to higher summer demand and a reduction in the number of U.S oil rigs for the 11th week for the first time since COVID-19.

Oil fell for three days with Brent finishing July 22 at $68.39 and WTI at $66.15. United States trade deals seemed less likely, but the possibility that tariffs would be postponed or stopped entirely kept prices from falling even further. Brent ended July at $72.53 and WTI at $69.26, both down about 1 percent on the final day due to uncertainty about the trump tariffs and countries yet to make trade deals. With U.S. inflation reported higher in June, interest rates were unlikely to go down. Also, U.S. crude production hit a record in May. Oil fell nearly 3 percent the next day due to concerns about OPEC and others increasing production and U.S. economic news that was not as good as hoped. Both indexes, however, finished the week up 6 percent. Higher tariffs on countries buying Russian oil were a factor.

Oil fell for six days with the prospect of talks between Donald Trump and Vladimir Putin. Oil rose for the week ending August 22 for the first time in three weeks because of uncertainty about a Russia-Ukraine peace deal. Brent finished up nearly 3 percent at &67.73 and WTI ended the week at $63.66. Oil ended August down on the last day of trading with demand expected to be low and predicted supplies increasing. Brent finished at $67.45 and WTI ended the month at $64.01.

The first week of September ended with oil falling more than 2 percent on a third down day after negative U.S. employment news and expectations of higher production by OPEC and others. Brent ended at $65.50 and WTI finished at $61.87. U.S. demand concerns prevented prices from rising too much after a Ukrainian attack on a Russian port. Brent finished the next week at $66.99 and WTI at $62.69, a day after both fell about 2 percent after an IEA report said supplies would increase.

On September 24 oil rose 2.5 percent to its highest point since August 1. Brent reached $69.31 and WTI closed at $64.99 after an unexpected drop in U.S. supplies and concerns over Ukraine attacks on Russia. On October 1, oil fell for the third day. Brent closed at $65.35, lowest since June 5, and WTI finished at $61.78, lowest since May 30. The causes included the 2025 United States federal government shutdown resulting in concerns about the world economy, and expected production increases by OPEC and others. Oil fell more than 3 percent to end the next week at a five-month low due to the chance of tariffs on Chinese products. Brent finished at $62.73, while WTI reached $58.23, both the lowest since early May. Oil ended the next week down with plans for Putin to meet with Trump again, expectation of increased supplies, and concerns about trade between the U.S. and China. Brent finished at $61.29 and WTI at $57.54.

On October 23 oil jumped more than 5 percent to its highest level in two weeks after U.S. sanctions on Russian oil companies. Brent finished at $65.99 with WTI at $61.79. Higher oil supplies meant oil finished the month down. Brent finished down 2.6 percent at $65.07 and WTI fell 2 percent to $60.98. Oil fell more than 1 percent on November 5, with Brent reaching $63.52 and WTI at $59.60, despite higher U.S. demand, as U.S. crude inventories increased, along with a Canada policy change and more increased production by OPEC and others. Brent finished the next week up more than 1 percent at $64.38 with WTI back over $60, after a Ukraine attack on the Russian port of Novorossiysk, which stopped oil shipments representing 2 percent of world supplies. With a strong dollar and the chance of a peace deal between Russia and Ukraine, oil ended the next week down 3 percent to the lowest point in a month, with Brent finishing at $62.56 and WTI at $58.06. The expected peace deal and speculation about what OPEC and others would do continued to push prices down. Brent and WTI ended November down for the fourth month in a row, though both were up 1 percent for the week. Brent ended at $63.20 and WTI at $58.55.

On December 5, oil jumped almost 1 percent to end the week at the highest level in two weeks because the Federal Reserve was expected to lower interest rates, and talks to end the Ukraine war were not going well. Brent finished at $63.75 and WTI was up 3 percent for the week to $60.08. On December 11, with U.S. fuel supplies high and a good chance of ending the Ukraine war, oil fell almost 2 percent to the lowest point since October. Brent eventually finished the day at $61.28 and WTI ended at $57.60. On December 15, with production expected to more than meet demand, oil fell nearly 3 percent, with Brent reaching $58.92 and WTI the lowest since 2021, at $55.92.

After the United States Coast Guard attempted to intercept a Venezuelan oil tanker on December 21, oil jumped nearly 3 percent the next day. Brent rose to $62.07 and WTI settled at $58.01 the next day. Ukraine attacks on Russian ships also caused oil to go up. Brent ended 2025 at $60.85, while WTI ended the year at $57.42.

== See also ==
- 2011–2013 world oil market chronology
- 2014–2016 world oil market chronology
- 2017–2019 world oil market chronology
- 2020–2022 world oil market chronology
- 2026–2028 world oil market chronology
- 2021–2023 global energy crisis
