= 2020–2022 world oil market chronology =

World oil market chronology between the years 2020-2022

== 2020 ==
On January 3, 2020, WTI finished up 2.2 percent for the week at $63.05, the highest since May, after U.S. air strikes in Iraq, with Brent up 2.6 percent for the week at $68.60. Then oil fell for five straight days before rising again; the U.S. "backed away from military confrontation" with Iran, and stockpiles were higher. WTI fell 6.4 percent for the week, the most since July, and on January 13 had its lowest close since December 3 at $58.08. Brent fell 5.3 percent, the most since August, and then reached its lowest close since December 12 with $64.20.

On February 10, oil reached its lowest level in over a year, with the COVID-19 pandemic a major reason. WTI fell 1.5 percent to $49.57, the lowest since January 2019, and Brent dropped 2.2 percent to $53.27, the lowest since December 2018. Russia had not agreed to further production cuts, though OPEC had a plan. Despite a forecast for lower demand, expectations of OPEC action led to three days of gains, with WTI reaching $51.42 and Brent $56.34. WTI ended February 28 down more than 16 percent for the week, the most in 11 years, falling 5 percent to $44.76 on February 28. Brent closed at $50.52. Both were the lowest since December 2018. Warmer than usual weather was one reason but the major factor was concerns about economic slowdown due to COVID-19.

During the 2020 Russia–Saudi Arabia oil price war, on March 8 oil fell over 30 percent. WTI reached $31.13, down 24.6 percent, with Brent $34.36, down 24.1 percent. Both were the lowest since 2016 and the one-day decline was the largest since 1991. On a week when oil fell the most since 2014, Russia rejected plans by OPEC and others to help calm the oil market, and Saudi Arabia was expected to increase production.

With worldwide demand continuing to decline due to COVID-19, oil fell for a fifth straight week at the end of March and any actions taken by Saudi Arabia or Russia would be inconsequential. During the last full week of March WTI fell about 5 percent to end at $21.51, with Brent down 7.6 percent for the week to $24.93. The price of Canadian heavy crude dipped below $5 per barrel.

In the first quarter, the percentage loss was the worst ever, 66.5 percent for WTI and 65.6 percent for Brent. Then on April 2, WTI jumped 24.7 percent to $25.32 and Brent rose 21 percent to $29.94, the biggest percentage increase in a single day ever, in anticipation of significant production cuts. OPEC agreed to production cuts on April 12; these would be greater in 2020 than in future years. U.S. crude supplies had risen for 12 weeks, including the largest increase for a week as of April 10. On April 14, the difference between the front month contract and contracts for later delivery were the most since 2009 for WTI, which traded $14.45 below the September contract. On April 17, May WTI was $18.27 but June WTI was $28.08. For Brent, the June contract was $28.08 while October was $35.95. The difference between the two was less because Brent did not require as much storage capacity. On April 20, the front month contract for WTI fell below zero, an unprecedented event. With the contract for May delivery expiring on April 21, the contract for June delivery became the new front month contract; on April 22 after settling at $13.78, WTI was the lowest since the 1990s.

On May 6 WTI fell after five days of increases, settling at $23.99 a day after a 20 percent jump to the highest close since April 17 with expectations of higher demand as countries around the world eased restrictions. Brent finished at $29.72 a day after a 14 percent jump. U.S. crude inventories were up for the 15th week, but by less than expected.

On May 21, WTI settled at $33.92 and Brent at $36.06, both the highest since March 10. U.S. crude supplies were down for the second week, and OPEC production was down. Positive economic news from Europe and the United States also contributed, although possible tensions with China limited gains.

WTI fell more than 8 percent on June 11, the most since April 27, and ended the week at $36.26 with its first down week in seven weeks. WTI and Brent both ended the week down over 8 percent. OPEC production cuts could not overcome COVID-19 concerns. For the week ending June 19, WTI climbed nearly 10 percent to $39.75 as OPEC made sure countries were complying with goals for output decreases. WTI fell nearly 6 percent June 24 then rose slightly the next day to close at $38.72, while Brent fell more than 5 percent and rose slightly to $41.05, in a week where both have fallen nearly 3 percent. Some U.S. states were delaying reopening, and others were going back to lockdowns. Also, U.S. supplies climbed for the third week while U.S. crude production was down 20 percent since early March. OPEC nations were continuing their production cuts. A negative forecast for the world economy also affected oil prices.

On July 15, after the largest drop in U.S. crude supplies of the year, WTI reached $41.20 and Brent $43.79, the highest since March 6 for both. That same day, OPEC and others said they planned to decrease production cuts in August but FXTM analyst Lukman Otunuga said it might not be the time for that given the chances of more COVID-19 related lockdowns or problems with the world economy.

The first week of August ended with WTI up 2.4 percent to $41.22 and Brent up 2 percent to $44.40. Production cuts took effect on August 1 but U.S. president Trump signed executive orders which added to tensions with China and helped drive prices down.

In the third week of August Brent fell 1 percent to $44.35, while WTI ended the week at $42.34 after the number of U.S. oil rigs rose after falling for three weeks. COVID-19 concerns have led to expectations of lower demand.

Low demand for oil in the U.S., lower U.S. unemployment, a strong U.S. dollar and losses in the stock market contributed to WTI falling nearly 4 percent on September 4 to $39.77, the first time below $40 since July. WTI ended the week down 7.5 percent after four up weeks, and Brent finished the week at $42.66, down nearly 7 percent. Demand for gasoline had recovered more quickly than demand for other petroleum products, and Michael Tran of RBC Capital said supplies fell at a "manic pace" over two months. Other products still had high inventories. Bad news about U.S. unemployment, a strong dollar, lower expected demand, and higher U.S. crude supplies contributed to the second down week for WTI, which fell 6.1 percent to $37.33. Brent fell 6.6 percent for the week to $39.83. This was the first time oil fell for two straight weeks since April.

For the week ending September 25, oil fell for the third time in four weeks due to COVID-19 concerns, fear that the U.S. recovery would slow down, and a higher U.S. dollar. WTI ended at $40.25, down 2.6 percent, and Brent was down 2.9 percent, with the most active contract ending at $42.41.

As a result of U.S. President Donald Trump being diagnosed with COVID-19, WTI fell 4.3 percent on October 2 to finish the week down 8 percent at $37.05, the lowest since September 8. Brent dropped 4.1 percent and 7.4 percent for the week to $39.27, the lowest since June 12. Continued concerns about the pandemic reducing demand also contributed even as U.S. supplies fell. An increase in U.S. inventories and an end to negotiations on COVID-19 relief in the U.S. contributed to another drop on October 7, with WTI down to $39.95 and Brent at $41.51. Increased imports from China helped oil rise by 2 percent on October 13, and expected production cuts by OPEC and allies led to a continued rise on October 14 to $41.04 for WTI and $43.32 for Brent. COVID-19 cases and high inventories, however, made the trend unlikely to continue.

Restrictions in Europe due to COVID-19 and expected delays for production cuts by OPEC and allies caused oil to rise November 2 for the first time in four trading days. WTI jumped from $33.64 to $36.81 and Brent rose from $35.74 to $38.97.

WTI and Brent both reached their highest settlements since September on November 18, with WTI at $41.82 and Brent at $44.34. One major factor was good news about COVID-19 vaccines. U.S. crude inventories rose more than expected, and uncertainty about OPEC and COVID-19 lockdowns contributed to lower prices the next day. Just before Thanksgiving, gas was $2.11, the lowest at that time of year since 2016 and 49 cents lower than a year earlier.

OPEC predicted lower demand on December 14, partly as a result of COVID-19 restrictions in Europe and the United States, and the IEA did the same on December 15. However, demand appeared likely to rise in China, and a pandemic relief package appeared more likely in the United States, while COVID-19 vaccines became available. WTI ended December 15 at $47.62, the highest since February, and Brent reached $50.76, the highest since March.

WTI ended 2020 at $48.52, down 20.5 percent in its second down year in three years but up 7 percent for the month and more than 20 percent for the quarter. Brent finished at $51.80, down 21.5 percent for the year but up 8.9 percent for December and 26.5 percent for the quarter. A weak dollar and lower than expected U.S. inventories kept oil high.

== 2021 ==
After Saudi Arabia promised further production cuts, WTI reached $51.28 on January 7 and Brent climbed as high as $54.90, the highest since before COVID-19. On January 14, a weaker dollar and an expected COVID-19 relief package helped oil move slightly higher, with WTI at $53.57 and Brent at $56.42, though Europe was experiencing more lockdowns and China had a higher number of COVID-19 cases, both making lower demand likely.

WTI finished the first week of February up 8.9 percent to $56.85 and Brent was up 7.8 percent to $59.34, the highest since January 2020 for both. COVID-19 vaccines were a big reason for positive economic news, though analyst Eugen Weinberg of Commerzbank believed optimism was too high.

On February 16, WTI closed above $60 for the first time since January 2020, with reasons that included Saudi Arabia production cuts, increased vaccine distribution, and the closing of refineries and production cuts resulting from the 2021 Texas power crisis. The Texas situation resulted in contango for WTI for the first time in seven months, meaning futures with earlier dates had lower prices. On February 23, Brent reached $65.37, the highest since January 2020.

After OPEC and others agreed to continue production cuts into April, WTI finished March 4 at $63.83, the highest since April 2019. Brent reached $66.74. Prices were increasing despite high U.S. crude supplies, though the cold weather continued to affect gasoline and distillate.

The third week of March ended with the largest loss for a week since October, with COVID-19 increases in Europe a big reason. WTI had fallen as low as $58.94 in a week where it fell 6,4 percent and lost 7.1 percent in one day. Brent finished the week at $64.53, down 6.8 percent for the week one day after falling 6.9 percent, the most in a day since June. Prices recovered March 19 only because of attacks on Yemen.

On March 24, after a significant decline the previous day due to COVID-19 lockdowns in Europe, the 2021 Suez Canal obstruction caused prices to recover. The news of the fifth straight week of increases in U.S. crude inventory had little effect.

WTI and Brent ended March down nearly 4 percent. With the April 1 announcement that OPEC and other nations would increase production, WTI rose 3.9 percent to close at $61.45 and Brent increased 3.4 percent to $64.86.

Oil reached its highest level since March 17 on April 14, with WTI at $63.15 and Brent at $66.58 as U.S. crude inventories fell and OPEC forecast higher demand and more economic growth. Optimism about the end of the pandemic was a factor. Positive economic news in the U.S. contributed to an increase in the price of oil for April, with WTI ending the month at $63.58, up 2.3 percent for the week and 7.5 percent for the month, while Brent finished at $67.25, up 1.7 percent and 5.8 percent. OPEC production increases and continued optimism about the worldwide economy offset news of increases in COVID-19 cases in India.

A positive demand forecast for China and the United States, along with lower U.S. crude inventories, led to the highest settlement for WTI since March, at $66.08, and Brent, at $69.32.

With continued good economic news in the U.S. as well as lower supplies, WTI had five straight gains ending May 27, with the highest settlement since October 2018, and ended the week and the month up 4.3 percent to $66.32. Brent finished May at $69.63, the highest since March 11, up 4.8 percent for the week and 3.5 percent for the month. The price of gas was $3.03, the highest for Memorial Day since 2014.

Although countries increased oil production in May, demand forecasts were high and on June 8 WTI closed above $70, with Brent at $72.22, the highest since May 2019. On June 25 WTI ended the week at $74.05, up 3.9 percent for the week, the fifth week in a row with an increase. Brent ended at $75.38 the highest since October 2018. All of this happened despite OPEC and allies considering production increases, because of very positive demand forecasts during a worldwide recovery. The difference between WTI and Brent narrowed due to stronger demand in the United States.

While OPEC and allies were expected to reach a deal, they had not by July 2. WTI finished the week at $75.16, up 1.5 percent for the week, with Brent at $76.17, up 1.1 percent. After the July 4 holiday, WTI briefly climbed to its highest price in six years before falling 2.4 percent to $73.37, while Brent fell 3.4 percent to $74.53. Some members of the cartel were expected to produce more than others, and the group cancelled its planned July 4 meeting. Gas was $3.12, the most in seven years and 44 percent higher than a year earlier.

On July 18 OPEC and allies agreed to increase production. The next day WTI fell 7.5 percent for its biggest one-day loss since September and reached the lowest close since May at $66.42, after the biggest loss for a week since March, a 3.7 percent drop. Brent fell nearly 7 percent to $68.62.

On August 9, oil fell more than 2 percent, continuing losses from the previous week, as COVID-19 restrictions in China and other parts of Asia threatened to slow demand. WTI reached its lowest level since May before recovering to $66.48, still the lowest in 3 weeks, while Brent fell to $69.04.

After seven days of losses, the most since 2019, oil jumped 6 percent on August 23, with WTI at $65.64 after a 9 percent decline the previous week and its lowest close since May 20. Brent finished at $68.65. Both had their worst week since October, with concern over the Delta variant, increased U.S. production, and negative economic news from China. Over the next three days, the increase in oil prices erased the previous week's losses. WTI climbed to $68.36 and Brent to $72.25 on August 25. Fuel demand in the U.S. was the highest since before the pandemic, U.S. crude inventories were the lowest since January 2020, and China reported fewer new COVID-19 cases.

For the week ending September 3, WTI rose slightly to $69.29 and Brent finished at $72.61. Losses due to negative economic news related to the Delta variant were cancelled out by Hurricane Ida stopping Gulf of Mexico oil production.

A strong dollar, Saudi Arabia price cuts and expected lower demand contributed to a 1.4 percent drop to $68.35 for WTI on September 7, However, with three-fourths of Gulf of Mexico production still not resumed, WTI finished the week at $69.72 and Brent at $72.92, both climbing 2.3 percent on September 10. Also contributing to an up week was a telephone call between U.S. President Joe Biden and Chinese leader Xi Jinping, a sign expected to mean more trade. The previous day oil fell 1 percent when Chinese government announced the release of reserves.

The week ending September 24 was the fifth week of increases for WTI, ending at $73.98, and the third for Brent, which closed at $78.09, the highest since October 2018. Supply disruptions included Hurricane Ida and problems with OPEC and associated countries.

On October 8, at the end of its seventh straight up week, the longest streak since 2013, WTI reached $80 a barrel for the first time since 2014. Brent finished the day at $83.32 after reaching a three-year high earlier in the week. Despite higher U.S. crude inventories, global supply remained tight even though OPEC and others agreed to a small production increase earlier in the week; Reuters was told the reason for not increasing production more was a possible increase in COVID-19 infections that could hurt demand. The United States Department of Energy declined to use the Strategic Petroleum Reserve. Gas was $3.26.

On October 21, one day after gains resulting from a report of low U.S. inventories, especially at Cushing, Oklahoma, oil fell significantly due to a forecast of a warmer than normal U.S. winter. WTI fell to $82.50. Brent had reached $86.10, the highest since October 2018, before falling to $84.61. Another factor was the decision by traders to sell when the price reached $86. Also, the prices of coal and natural gas were down. The next week, after peaking once again, Brent had its first down week in two months, ending at $84.38, with WTI also down for the week at $83.57. Higher U.S. stocks and the possibility of a production increase by Iran were major factors.

On November 3, WTI fell to $80.86 and Brent fell to $81.99, with both falling the most in one day since August. Crude stocks were higher though stocks at Cushing were still the lowest in three years. The next week was the third down week for WTI, which ended at $80.79, and Brent, which fell to $82.17. The dollar was strong, President Joe Biden was considering releasing oil from the Strategic Petroleum Reserve, and the Federal Reserve was considering increasing interest rates to deal with inflation. Also, the U.S. oil and gas rig count was the highest since April 2020.

Four weeks of losses happened for the first time since March 2020. On November 19, with news of a COVID lockdown in Austria and the possibility of more lockdowns in Europe, WTI fell over 4 percent to $75.37, lowest since October 7. Brent reached $78.15 for the first time since October 1. Gas was $3.41.

Concerns over the Omicron variant caused yet another loss for the week, with WTI down more than 10 percent to $68.15, with a 13 percent drop just on November 26, the most in one day since April 2020. Brent fell nearly 12 percent to $72.72 and was down over 8 percent for the week. The losses cancelled out gains earlier in the week resulting from OPEC and allies considering production cuts after strategic releases.

For the week ending December 10, WTI and Brent both had their first up week in seven weeks, despite falling about 2 percent on December 9. Reasons included encouraging news about the effectiveness of vaccines against the Omicron variant and the largest year-to-year U.S. inflation increase since 1982. Omicron was blamed for a loss the next week, with WTI finishing at $70.86 and Brent at $73.52, both down 1.4 percent.

WTI ended December at $75.21 while Brent finished at $77.78. Increases in COVID-19 cases worldwide led to a drop after several days of increases.

== 2022 ==
In the first week of the year, oil rose more than 5 percent with WTI ending at $78.90 and Brent finishing at $81.75. Both were the highest since November. U.S. crude inventories fell for six straight weeks, reaching their lowest level since September, very cold weather in North Dakota and Alberta led to lower production and the closing of the Keystone Pipeline, and protests in Kazakhstan and maintenance in Libya meant lower production in those areas. Oil fell slightly on January 7 due to negative U.S. employment numbers. However, with the Omicron variant appearing to be less serious, predictions of lower demand were no longer a concern. The next week, WTI increased 6.3 percent to $83.82, with Brent rising 5.4 percent to $86.06. Reasons included the Russia-Ukraine situation and the Martin Luther King Jr. Day in the United States. On January 18, WTI reached $85.43 and Brent hit $87.51, both the highest since October 2014, after Houthi attacks on the United Arab Emirates. U.S. crude and fuel inventories rose and oil prices fell, still finishing higher for the 5th week.

In the last full week of January, WTI reached $88.84, the highest in seven years, before settling at $86.82. Brent reached $91.70, highest since October 2014, before falling to $90.03. Both had the most up weeks since October. On February 3 WTI traded for $90 a barrel for the first time since October 2014. Cold weather and possible production decreases were major reasons.

With U.S. crude stocks at their lowest since October 2018, and a record for product supplied, along with continued concerns about Russia and Ukraine, as well as possible supply problems in the United Arab Emirates, WTI rose to $89.66 and Brent to $91.55. The increase in WTI reduced the amount by which later contracts were trading for less than those for front-month. Oil finished the eighth up week at another record, up 3 percent for the day, surpassing the record set earlier in the week, with WTI at $93.19 and Brent at $94.44. A strong economic recovery was expected to mean high demand.

After Russia invaded Ukraine on February 24, Brent reached $105.79, the first time above $105 since August 2014, before settling at $99.08. WTI hit $100.54, the highest since September 2014, before falling to $92.81. Biden announced plans to release more oil from the Strategic Petroleum Reserve and U.S. crude inventories increased more than expected. On March 1 Brent jumped more than 7 percent and closed at $104.97, highest since August 2014, and WTI rose 8 percent for its biggest one-day increase since November 2020, settling at $103.41, highest since July 2014. The increases happened despite International Energy Agency releases of oil from strategic reserves. U.S. crude stocks fell the previous week. On March 3 Brent reached $120 for the first time since 2012 and WTI went over $116 for the first time since 2008 but Brent ended the day down more than 2 percent at $110.47 and WTI fell 2.6 percent to $107.67. Brent ended the week up 20 percent.

As a result of fears of countries not buying Russian oil or natural gas, on March 6 WTI reached $130.50, the highest since July 2008, before settling at $119.40, up more than 3 percent and the highest settlement since September 2008. Brent reached $139.13, also the highest since July 2008, before settling at $123.21, after the US said it was in “active discussions” to ban Russian crude imports. The price of gas went over $4 for the first time since 2008. Then on March 9, after United Arab Emirates ambassador to the United States Yousef Al Otaiba said he would encourage OPEC to increase production, oil fell the most in one day in two years, WTI dropping 12 percent to below $109, and Brent 13 percent to $111. The next day WTI rose 5.7 percent before ending the day down 2.5 percent to $106.02, and Brent rose 6.5 percent but settled down 1.6 percent at $109.33. This came after UAE Energy Minister Suhail Al Mazroui said OPEC would continue with its previous agreement rather than significantly increasing production. However, more stockpile releases were possible, and the U.S. was working on a deal with Iran and on increased oil from Venezuela, all of which would increase supply. Some believed the decline was due to profit taking. While both Brent and WTI rose more than 3 percent on March 11, Brent ended the week down 4.8 percent at $112.67 and WTI was down 5.7 percent to $109.33. With Russian oil banned by the U.S. and others, other countries were not expected to make up for the loss, at least not in the short term.

On March 14, Brent fell more than 5 percent to $106.90 while WTI fell nearly 6 percent to $103.01, the lowest in two weeks, as supplies worldwide appeared likely to increase, with positive news from talks to end the war. The next day an increase in COVID-19 in China contributed to Brent falling 6.5 percent to $99.91 and WTI falling 6.4 percent to $96.44, both below $100 for the first time since February. Oil climbed higher due to lack of progress on talks between Russia and Ukraine, but WTI finished the week at $104.70 and Brent settled a $107.93, both down 4.2 percent for the week.

For the week ending March 25, WTI rose more than 10 percent to $113.90 and Brent finished up nearly 12 percent at $120.65. Houthi rebels attacked a Saudi oil depot, while some European Union countries refused to boycott Russian oil after the U.S. and the U.K. had done so, U.S. drilling rigs increased, and the Caspian Pipeline Consortium had an interruption due to bad weather which ended later in the week.

After Biden announced the release of 180 million barrels from the Strategic Reserve over a period of six months starting in May, WTI ended March down 7 percent to $100.28, with Brent falling more than 5 percent to $105.16. For the week, WTI finished at $99.27, the lowest since March 16 and down 12.8 percent for the week. Brent ended the week at $104.39, down 11.1 percent. Both percentage drops were the most for a week since April 2020. International Energy Agency members met April 1 and agreed to further strategic reserve releases. OPEC and others agreed to production increases in May.

The first full week of April ended with WTI at $98.26 and Brent at $102.78, both down for the second week. U.S. rigs were up for the third week, and lockdowns in China continued, while the United States Congress voted to ban Russian oil.

On April 12 oil rose 6 percent, followed by a gain of nearly 4 percent on April 13, with WTI finishing at $104.25 and Brent at $108.78. While U.S. oil stocks were up and the IEA expected lower worldwide demand as production increases made up for the loss of Russian oil, talks between Russia and Ukraine were not going well. Nearly a week later WTI reached $108.21, highest since March 25, before both WTI and Brent fell more than 5 percent on April 19. For the week ending April 15, U.S. crude supplies fell by the most in a year causing a slight increase in WTI to $102.75, while Brent fell further to $106.80. WTI ended the week at $102.07 and Brent finished at $106.65, both down almost 5 percent for the week with economic reports suggesting slow growth worldwide, especially in China with some cities in COVID-19 lockdowns. Another factor was an expected stronger dollar resulting from Federal Reserve interest rate increases.

WTI ended April at $104.69 with Brent at $107.14; both rose for the week and ended the month higher for the fifth time. Russian supply concerns and expectations that Germany would stop imports from Russia were factors. However, China's lockdown continued. Despite concerns about slow economic growth, oil ended the first week of May higher for the second week, with WTI at $109.77 ad Brent at $112.39. OPEC and others did not intend to help as possible European Union sanctions on Russian oil threatened supplies. The next week WTI finished at $110.49, up for the third week and the highest close since March 25, while Brent finished down for the week for the first time in three weeks at $111.55. U.S. gasoline stockpiles had fallen for the sixth week, and gas was at a record $4.43. Russia put sanctions on several European countries, and the situation in China was not as bad as feared. On May 17 and 18, oil fell due to the possible ending of restrictions on Venezuela and comments by Federal Reserve chair Jerome Powell about possible negative economic consequences from dealing with inflation. Oil then rose again due to a weak dollar. Brent finished May 19 at $112.04 while WTI was at $112.21.

In the final week of May, Brent jumped 6 percent to $119.43, while WTI climbed 1.5 percent to $115.07. Higher demand, including the Memorial Day weekend in the United States, was a major factor. The next week, the European Union agreed to cut imports from Russia by 90 percent by the end of the year and Shanghai ended its lockdown. The Energy Information Administration reported U.S. crude production in March was the highest since November. Then OPEC and other countries agreed to a production increase, but U.S. crude inventories fell, so WTI finished June 2 higher at $116.87, with Brent at $117.61.

Though both fell on June 10 with news about U.S. inflation and the expectation the Federal Reserve will act "aggressively", along with new COVID restrictions in China, WTI finished the first full week of June up 1.2 percent to $120.67, with Brent rising 1.9 percent to $122.01. On June 11, the price of gas exceeded $5 for the first time.

With concerns about possible Federal Reserve actions, oil fell June 22. WTI reached $101.53, lowest since May 11, and Brent fell as low as $107.03, lowest since May 19. Both recovered after positive comments by Fed Chair Jerome Powell.

Brent and WTI both ended June lower, the first down month since November. The next day both rose more than 2 percent, with Brent finishing at $111.63 and WTI at $108.43. U.S. manufacturing was down, but crude and fuel supplies were also lower due to problems in Libya and an expected strike in Norway. The first full week of July was a down week as central banks increased interest rates leading to recession concerns and China faced the possibility of more lockdowns. Positive jobs news in the United States actually increased the likelihood of the Federal Reserve increasing rates further. On July 5 Brent fell $10.73, the third-largest fall in a day since it began trading in 1988. Brent ended the week at $107.02, down 4.1 percent, and WTI finished at $104.79. With continued recession concerns, the next week was the third down week for Brent, which fell 5.5 percent to $101.16 and the second down week for WTI, which fell 6.9 percent to $97.59. After both fell below the last closing before the Ukraine War, both were up 2 percent on July 15 due to doubts Saudi Arabia or even OPEC could increase production. On July 22 WTI ended below $95 for the first time since April in its third down week, with concerns over more interest rate increases and resumed production in Libya. Brent finished at $103.60, higher for the first time in six weeks as Asian demand showed signs of increasing.

Recession fears, lower demand for gasoline due to high prices, and an unexpectedly large increases in U.S. inventories sent oil prices down more than 2 percent on August 4. Brent finished the day at $94.12 and WTI at $88,54, in both cases the lowest since February. Also, the previous day OPEC and others vowed to increase production in September. Gas fell below $4 for the first time since March on August 11. The next day Brent ended at $98.15 and WTI at $92.05. Both finished the week up more than 3 percent. A pipeline repair in the Gulf of Mexico was completed, meaning gains the previous day were cancelled out. A strong dollar and lower fuel prices resulted in lower import prices, and inflation expectations were down. The U.S. oil rig count increased. Recession fears and a strong dollar led to oil falling 1.5 percent the next week, with Brent at $96.72 and WTI at $90.77. The following week, the possibility of OPEC production cuts led to Brent rising 4.4 percent to $100.99 and WTI climbing 2.5 percent to $93.06, even with U.S. interest rates expected to rise further. The next week, Brent fell 7.9 percent to $93.02 and WTI dropped 6.7 percent to $86.87 despite both rising on September 2 due to some sources expecting production cuts by OPEC and other nations. COVID restrictions in China and negative economic news worldwide were major factors, though good economic news in the United States made lower interest rate increases more likely.

In the first full week of September, Brent reached its lowest level since January before finishing the week down slightly at $92.84, with WTI also down slightly at $86.79. Both rose about 4 percent on September 9 due to concerns that Russia would stop selling oil to Europe if price caps were imposed as well as OPEC and others announcing a small decrease in output. However, a large interest rate increase by the European Central Bank and China COVID restrictions kept prices down. A strong dollar and the prospect of future interest rate increases caused oil to fall nearly 2 percent the next week, with Brent finishing at $91.35 and WTI at $85.11. Lower interest rate increases than expected in England, higher demand in China and concerns over supplies from Russia helped prices to rise slightly on September 22 after a decline due to a U.S. interest rate increase the previous day. Brent finished at $90.46, with WTI at $83.49, before a 4 percent drop for Brent to $86.15 and a 5 percent drop for WTI to $78.74 (the first time below $80 all year) the next day due to recession fears. Gas was $3.69. For the first time in five weeks, oil rose for the week ending September 30, with Brent ending at $87.96, and WTI finished at $79.49 after both reached their lowest level in nine months earlier in the week. This happened despite OPEC September output being its highest since 2020. Other factors included the dollar reaching the highest in 20 years, slower growth because of recession concerns and predictions that OPEC and others would reduce output.

After OPEC and other nations agreed to lower their output target by 2 million barrels per day, the most since 2020, oil reached its highest level in more than a month. Brent finished the first week of October up 11 percent at $97.92 while WTI jumped 17 percent to $92.64. The gains were the most in a week since March. The next week oil fell due to low demand in China because of COVID, a strong dollar and U.S. recession worries. Brent fell more than 6 percent to $91.63 and WTI lost nearly 8 percent to finish at $85.61. Brent jumped 2 percent to $93.50 the next week but WTI fell slightly to $85.05. Unconfirmed reports that China was easing restrictions outweighed recession concerns. On October 26 Brent jumped more than 2 percent to $95.69 and WTI rose 3 percent to $87.91 due to the weak dollar and the lowest net U.S. imports ever as well as higher than expected increase in U.S. crude stocks. Brent and WTI both finished October higher, the first increase for a month since May, due to the actions by OPEC and others. WTI ended the week up 5 percent at $92.61, with all of the increase happening November 4, and Brent was up about 3 percent for the week at $98.57. More interest rate increases were likely but higher U.S. unemployment would mean those increases would be smaller. China appeared likely to lessen COVID restrictions even with case numbers rising. The next week oil fell due to higher U.S. inventories, but lower U.S. inflation and a weak dollar limited losses. WTI finished at $88.96 and Brent at $95.99.

Oil fell for a second week, with Brent down 9 percent to $87.62 and WTI down 10 percent to $80.08, with higher COVID numbers in China, fears of U.S. interest rate increases and a strong dollar. The current WTI contract was trading lower than the second month contract for the first time since 2021. The next week was the third down week for both Brent, down nearly 5 percent to $83.63, and WTI, finishing almost 5 percent lower at $76.28. Brent joined WTI with second months trading at less than the front month due to oversupply. Both also reached 10-month lows during the week as COVID worsened in China and a price cap on Russian oil was discussed.

The first full week of December, oil fell about 10 percent for the week, the most since April, with negative economic news from the United States, Europe and China and the restarting of the Keystone Pipeline after a leak. Recession fears cancelled gains from expected production cuts by Russia and caused WTI to fall to $71.02 and Brent to reach $76.10. The next week Brent rose by the most since October but fell more than 2 percent to $79.04 on December 16 with news that the U.S. would continue interest rate increases, and the U.K. and European Central Bank raising rates during the week. The Keystone pipeline outage increased prices for heavier grades but did not affect the benchmarks. Plans for the U.S. to buy oil to refill the Strategic Petroleum Reserve also helped prices rise, with WTI up for the week to $74.29. The following week, with Russia threatening to cut output due to a price cap, oil rose the most in a week since October, with Brent reaching $83.92 and WTI up to $79.56. Brent finished the year at $85.91, with WTI at $80.26.

== See also ==
- 2011–2013 world oil market chronology
- 2014–2016 world oil market chronology
- 2017–2019 world oil market chronology
- 2023–2025 world oil market chronology
- 2026–2028 world oil market chronology
- 2021–2023 global energy crisis
