= 2026–present world oil market chronology =

Events affecting the oil market

== 2026 ==
Both Brent and WTI jumped more than 2 percent on the last day of the first full week of 2026. Brent increased 4 percent for the week to finish at $63.34 and WTI increased 3 percent to $59.12. Protests in Iran and attacks by Russia on Ukraine cancelled out higher worldwide supply. after five up days, oil fell more than 4 percent on January 15 in response to a conflict with Iran being less likely, meaning no disruptions to oil. U.S. inventories also rose, and U.S. relations with Venezuela stabilized. After reaching $66.82, its highest point since September, the previous day, Brent finished at $63.76 and WTI ended at $59.19. Oil ended January near the highest price since August 2025, with Brent finishing at $70.69 and WTI at $65.21, due to uncertainty about Iran. On February 5, oil fell nearly 3 percent, with Brent ending the day at $67.55 and WTI at $63.29, after the U.S. and Iran agreed to talks. The first full week of February ended with continued uncertainty over a possible U.S. conflict with Iran, and Brent finishing at $68.05, with WTI at $63.55. On February 12, an International Energy Agency forecast of lower demand, increased U.S. crude inventories and a good chance of solving the Iran problem led to a nearly 3 percent drop in oil prices. Brent finished at $67.52 and WTI at $62.84. Because of fears of a supply disruption in the Middle East, oil jumped 4 percent on February 18 and then reached the highest level in six months on February 19, with Brent finishing at $71.66 and WTI at $66.43. Oil finished the week up more than 1 percent after talks between the U.S. and Iran continued but did not appear likely to have the desired resolution. Brent finished at $72.48 and WTI at $67.02. At this time, the price of gas was $2.98.

As a result of the 2026 Iran war, Brent finished March 3 at $81.49, the highest since January 2025, and WTI finished March 4 at $74.66, the highest since June. With U.S. President Donald Trump demanding unconditional surrender from Iran, the first full week of March ended with U.S. crude rising more than 35 percent, the biggest gain for a week since the futures contract began in 1983. WTI ended the week at $90.90, while Brent climbed 28 percent to $92.69, the most for a week since April 2020. On March 9, after Trump announced he was considering taking over the Strait of Hormuz, U.S. crude fell more than 6 percent to $85.27 and Brent declined nearly 6 percent to $88.43. Both had reached nearly $120 as oil went over $100 for the first time since early 2022 at the start of the Russia–Ukraine war. As a result of the 2026 Strait of Hormuz crisis, only a few ships were passing through the strait.

On March 18, the difference between Brent and WTI was the most in eleven years. Brent finished nearly 4 percent higher with continued threats by Iran to attack Middle East targets. The difference was $12.05 at one point. This was enough to offset additional costs associated with shipping as U.S. oil exports increased while the Strait of Hormuz remained closed. With the International Energy Agency releasing oil from reserves and the U.S. planning similar action, WTI remained the same. That same day, the price of gas reached $3.84, the highest since September 2023. The difference between Brent and WTI was more than $15, the most since 2012. Brent finished the week at $112.19 and U.S. crude finished at $98.32 after a force majeure by Iraq.

Oil finished the next week at the highest level since July 2022. Brent ended the week at $112.57 and U.S. crude finished at $99.64. After Trump's speech on April 1, WTI jumped 11 percent to finish at $111.54. Brent fell below $100 a barrel after comments by Trump that suggested the war would end soon, but then jumped almost 8 percent to $109.03. Not only did WTI rise above Brent, but the difference between WTI and Brent was the highest since 2009.

After announcement of a cease-fire in the Iran War, oil fell by the highest percentage in a single day since April 2020. Brent finished at $94.75, down over 13 percent, after reaching $90.40 at one point. WTI fell more than 16 percent to close at $94.43 after going as low as $91.03. Gas was $4.16.Iran continued to limit traffic in the Strait of Hormuz, causing WTI to rise more than 3 percent to $97.87, while Brent finished at $95.92, up more than 1 percent. Gains would have been higher but Israel agreed to talks with Lebanon.

On April 17 after Iran's foreign minister declared the Strait of Hormuz open, U.S. crude fell almost 12 percent to close at $83.85, while Brent fell 9 percent to $90.38.

With continued problems in the Strait of Hormuz, and the resignation of Iran's top negotiator, oil jumped 3 percent on April 23. Brent ended the day at $105.07, with WTI finishing the day at $95.85.

After Trump threatened to continue a blockade of the Strait of Hormuz until a deal was reached, on April 29 Brent jumped 6 percent to $118.03 and WTI climbed almost 7 percent to $106.88. Brent fell over 3 percent to $114.01 the next day after reaching a four-year high of $126, while WTI fell more than 1 percent to $105.07.

On May 4, with more attacks making the cease-fire appear shaky, Brent jumped nearly 6 percent to $114.40, and WTI increased more than 4 percent to finish the day at $106.42. Gas was $4.48 on May 5. In early trading May 6, WTI fell 8 percent to $94.32 and Brent fell 7 percent to $102.14 with the possibility the U.S. and Iran were close to an agreement. WTI ended the day down more than 6 percent, the most in one day since March 17, to $96.21, the first close below $100 in six days. Brent fell almost 8 percent, briefly below $100 for the first time since April 22.

With an agreement between the U.S. and Iran appearing unlikely, Brent jumped more than 3 percent to $107.27 on May 12, and WTI rose over 4 percent to $102.18. May 18 was the sixth day of increases in seven, with Brent up 2.6 percent and WTI more than 3 percent. With uncertainty about whether there would be more strikes by the United States, the next day both fell nearly 1 percent, with Brent finishing at $111.28 and WTI at $107.77.

On May 27 oil fell more than 5 percent after United States Secretary of State Marco Rubio said talks would be given "every chance to succeed". WTI finished at $88.68 and Brent settled at $94.29. On June 3, oil jumped 2 percent after Israeli prime minister Benjamin Netanyahu said the U.S. and Israel might strike Iran again. WTI closed at $96.02 and Brent finished at $97.81. On June 5, WTI fell close to 3 percent to $90.54 and Brent declined 2 percent to $93.09 with less chance of more conflict between the U.S. and Iran, though both appeared likely to have a gain for the week for the first time in three weeks--1 percent for Brent and 3 percent for WTI.

With an agreement between the U.S. and Iran seeming more likely, despite contradictory statements from the Trump administration, oil fell more than 3 percent on June 12, ending the week down 6 percent. WTI closed at $84.88 and Brent finished at $87.33. The next week, oil fell after a cease-fire between Israel and Hezbollah, then rose again after an end to talks between the U.S. and Iran, with Brent ending the week at $80.57 and WTI at &77.54. On June 24, with tankers going through the Strait of Hormuz, oil fell 4 percent. WTI closed at $69.63, its first time below $70 since March 2. Brent closed at $73.74, its lowest close since February 28. On July 1, with Trump saying talks were going well, Brent fell almost 2 percent to close at $71.57 and WTI fell more than 1 percent to $68.58.

On July 8, Trump threatened more bombing of Iran and blockading of the Strait of Hormuz. Brent jumped more than 5 percent to $78.02 and WTI finished at $73.52, up more than 4 percent.

On July 17 oil jumped more than 4 percent after Kuwait claimed Iran attacked a power and desalinization plant. WTI reached $82.49 and Brent finished at $88.10. Iran said it attacked various countries after the U.S. attacked Iran. The U.S. says it has struck Iran on six nights. With reports of attacks on tankers in the Red Sea and threats from Trump, Brent closed above $100 on July 23 for the first time since May 26, gaining 7 percent for the day. WTI closed at $92.19, up 6 percent. The next week, with Iran promising to stop attacks if the U.S. did the same, Brent fell nearly 9 percent to $88.36, and WTI closed down 7.5 percent at $82.61.

In the first week of August, oil fell 7 percent. It appeared an agreement to fully reopen the Strait of Hormuz would happen, but traffic through the strait was down on August 7 as the wait continued. Oil jumped about 1 percent, with Brent closing at $83.55 and WTI at $78.18. The next week oil fell 5 percent but rose on August 14, erasing the previous day's losses, after the U.S. said the blockade of the Strait of Hormuz would continue. Brent finished the week at $88.52 and WTI ended at $82.40. On August 20, oil rose more than 2 percent after the U.S. announcement of "the toughest sanctions in history" on Iran, and the United Arab Emirates ending trade with Iran the previous day. Brent closed at $93.73 with WTI at $86.64. Gas was $4.10.

In the last full week of August, oil fell due to U.S. sanctions on Iran rather than potential military action, with Brent ending the week down more than 5 percent at $89.31 and WTI off 4 percent to $83.40.

Oil ended the first week of September higher with Brent up about 6 percent at $95.29 early on September 4 and WTI gaining more than 8 percent to $90.76.

On September 9, Brent crude rose above $100 per barrel amid escalating fighting between the United States and Iran and concerns over disruptions to Middle Eastern oil supplies. Brent closed at $101.21 per barrel, while West Texas Intermediate closed at $96.05. Both benchmarks recorded their highest closing prices since May 22. The week ended with oil down more than 2 percent, but still up for the week, after talks between Iran and other countries were announced. Diesel set a record on September 11, at $6.06 a gallon, breaking the record of $5.82 after the invasion of Ukraine in 2022.

On September 17 oil fell as Saudi exports were sent through the Strait of Hormuz because of the loss of a pipeline. Oil was still up 2 percent for the week. Brent closed at $104.82 and WTI at $101.91. Oil declined for five days, falling 17 percent, before jumping on September 23 when Iran's president Masoud Pezeshkian said the country would not surrender. Brent increased about 4 percent to $103.08, still off about 1 percent for the week, and WTI jumped nearly 2 percent to $92.16, down 8 percent for the week.

On October 1, after the news the U.S. was expected to send an additional aircraft carrier to the Middle east, Brent increased by more than 4 percent to close at $102.31, while WTI jumped nearly 3 percent to $92.87. Diesel was $6.40. On October 8, oil jumped 4 percent in response to attacks by Iran on the Strait of Hormuz and Hurricane Isaias in the Gulf of Mexico. Brent closed at $104.28 and WTI at $91.49.

On October 16, concern about supplies caused Brent to jump nearly 4 percent to $109.86, the most since May 19, and WTI to close at $101.41, the most since September 17. For the week Brent was up nearly 5 percent while WTI was up more than 10 percent.

== See also ==
- 2011–2013 world oil market chronology
- 2014–2016 world oil market chronology
- 2017–2019 world oil market chronology
- 2020–2022 world oil market chronology
- 2023–2025 world oil market chronology
