= 2011–2013 world oil market chronology =

== 2011 ==
Political turmoil in Egypt, Libya, Yemen, and Bahrain drove oil prices to $95/barrel in late February 2011. A few days prior, oil prices on the NYMEX closed at $86. Oil prices topped at $103 on February 24 where oil production is curtailed to the political upheaval in Libya.

Oil supplies remained high, and Saudi Arabia assured an increase in production to counteract shutdowns. Still, the Mideast and North African crisis led to a rise in oil prices to the highest level in two years, with gasoline prices following. Though most Libyan oil went to Europe, all oil prices reacted. The average price of gasoline in the United States increased 6 cents to $3.17. On March 1, 2011, a significant drop in Libyan production and fears of more instability in other countries pushed the price of oil over $100 a barrel in New York trading, while the average price of gas reached $3.37. Despite Saudi promises, the sour type oil the country exported could not replace the more desirable sweet Libyan oil. On March 7, 2011, the average price of gas having reached $3.57, individuals were making changes in their driving.

The weakened U.S. Dollar resulted in a spike to $112/barrel with the national average of $3.74/gallon – with expectations of damaging the U.S. economy suggestive of a long-term recession. As of April 26, the national average was $3.87 – with a fear of $4/gallon as the nationwide average prior to the summer driving season.

The national average rose on May 5, 2011 for the 44th straight day, reaching $3.98. However, that same day, West Texas Intermediate crude fell below $100 a barrel, the lowest since March 16. This came after crude oil for June delivery reached $114.83 on May 2, the highest since September 2008, before closing at $97.18 on May 6, a day after dropping 9%, the most dramatic single-day drop in over two years. Gas prices fell slightly on May 6, and experts predicted $3.50 a gallon by summer.

In mid-June, West Texas Intermediate crude for July delivery fell nearly $2 to $93.01, the lowest price since February. The dollar was up and the euro and other currencies down, and the European economic crisis made investors concerned. London Brent crude fell 81 cents to $113.21. On June 15 the Energy Information Association said oil consumption was down 3.5% from a year earlier, but wholesale gasoline demand was up for the first time in several weeks. The price of gas on June 17 was $3.67.5 a gallon, 25.1 cents lower than a month earlier but 96.8 cents above a year earlier. On June 24, the price of gas was $3.62.8 and expected to go much lower due to the opening of the Strategic Petroleum Reserve. U.S. oil prices fell below $90 before rising again, and Brent crude fell 2%. However, on June 29, West Texas intermediate crude had risen to $94.96, almost $5 above the lowest point reached after the previous week's action. One reason was the falling dollar, as Greece appeared less likely to default on its debt; concern over the Greek debt crisis had caused falling oil prices. After another week, oil for August delivery had risen from $90.61 to $98.67 and gas prices were up five cents. Increased worldwide demand was one reason. Brent Crude remained high at $118.38 partly due to supply problems in Europe, including lower North Sea production and the continuing war in Libya.

On August 4, the price of oil dropped 6% to its lowest level in 6 months. On August 5, the price had dropped $8.82 in a week to $86.88 per barrel on the New York Mercantile Exchange. The same pessimistic economic news that caused stock prices to fall also decreased expected energy demand, and experts predicted a gas price drop of 35 cents per gallon from the average of $3.70. On August 8, oil fell over 6%, in its largest drop since May, to $81, its lowest price of the year. On September 24, oil reached $79.85, down 9% for the week, due to concerns about another recession and the overall world economy. The average price of gas was $3.51, with predictions of $3.25 by November, but it was below $3 in some markets.

During October, the price of oil rose 22%, the fastest pace since February, as worries over the U.S. economy decreased, leading to predictions of $4 by early 2012. As of November 8, the price reached $96.80. Gas prices were not following the increase, due to lower demand resulting from the economy, the normal decrease in travel, lower oil prices in other countries, and production of winter blends which cost less. The average rose slightly to $3.41 but predictions of $3.25 were made.

== 2012 ==
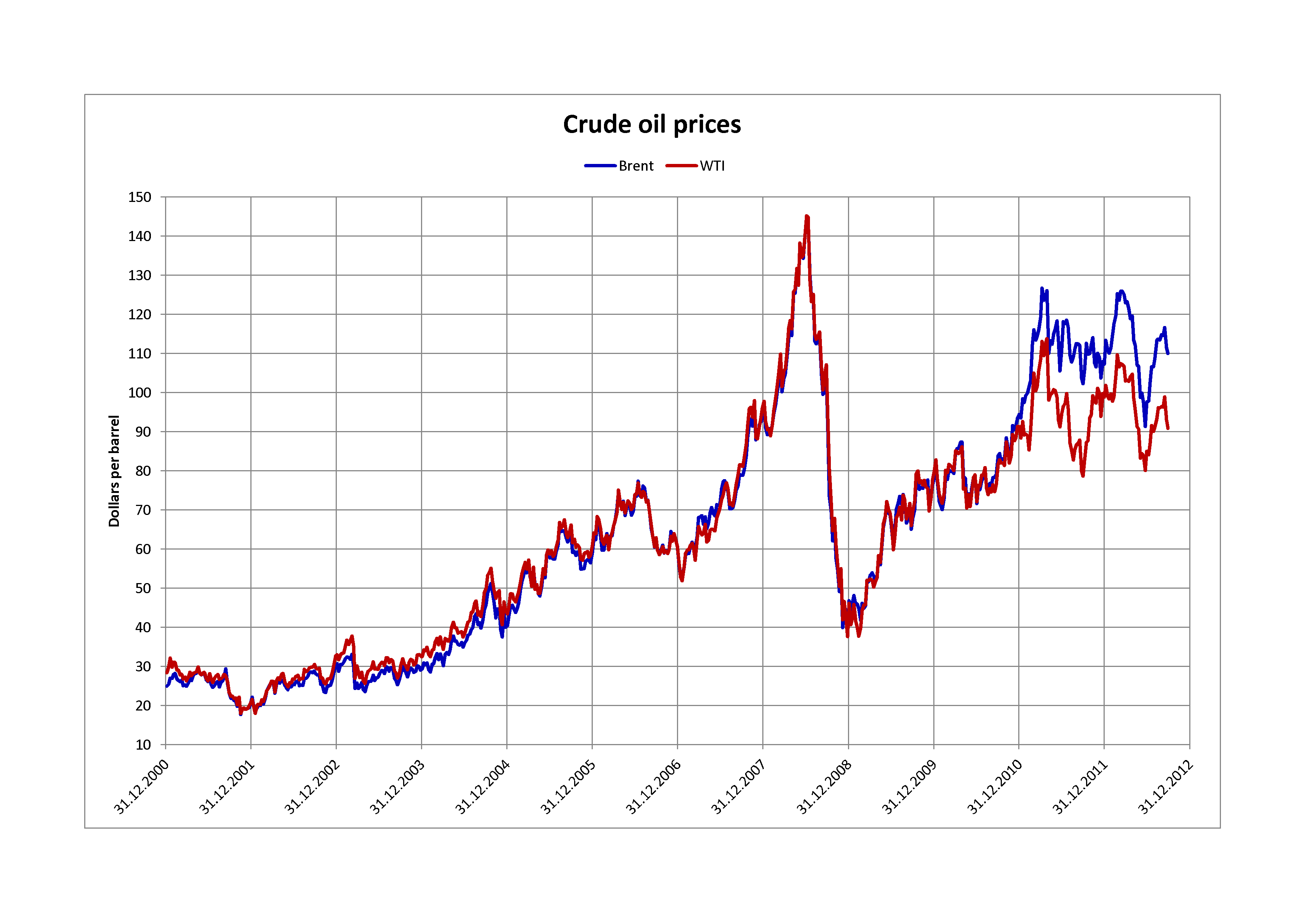
Brent versus WTI

Shortages of oil could have resulted if Iran closed the Strait of Hormuz, through which one-fifth of exported oil travels, as a result of sanctions due to the country's nuclear policies. The price of oil stayed near $100 throughout January because of concerns over supplies, and the European debt situation. The average price of gas was $3.38 on January 20, up 17 cents from a month earlier. Another factor was planned closing of refineries in the U.S. and Europe due to lower demand. By early February, the national average was $3.48, though oil prices were at $98, the lowest in six weeks, and U.S. demand was the lowest since September 2001. On February 20, benchmark March crude oil reached $105.21, the highest in nine months. This came one day after Iran's oil ministry announced an end to sales to British and French companies; though this would have little actual impact on supplies, fears resulted in higher prices. Also, approval of the bailout plan for Greece was expected, and China's action to raise the money supply was likely to stimulate the economy. Brent crude was up 11% for the year to $119.58 on February 17, with cold weather in Europe and higher Third World demand, and West Texas Intermediate crude was up 19% to $103.24. The average price of gas was $3.53. On February 29, the average was $3.73. The average peaked at $3.94 early in April, and on April 24, it was $3.85 compared to $3.86 a year earlier; it had been two years since gas prices were lower than the previous year. Crude oil prices were down; West Texas Intermediate was $103.55 a barrel, down from over $107 late in March, and Brent Crude $118.16 after peaking above $128 in March. On May 7, benchmark U.S. crude reached $95.34, the lowest price of the year, after voters in France and Greece ousted government officials who would cut spending to solve the debt crisis. Benchmark oil in New York actually rose for two days straight early in June, to $84.29. With U.S. oil supplies the highest since 1990, gas reached $3.57 on June 5. After falling again to its lowest price since October 2011, Benchmark crude rose 5.8% to $82.18 on June 29, with Brent crude up 4.5% to $95.51. European bailout efforts included lending money to banks, decreasing likelihood of failures. Also, European countries decided not to buy Iranian oil. The price of gas was $3.35, the lowest since January 6. On July 17, Benchmark Crude reached $89.22 and Brent crude $104 after good economic news in the United States. Gas rose to $3.40.

On August 7, a California refinery fire contributed to a jump in oil futures. Other refinery problems, a pipeline leak, fears about Iran, the crisis in Syria, North Sea problems, and Tropical Storm Ernesto all contributed to a 20% jump in oil prices in six weeks. The price of gas reached $3.63 but was not expected to go much higher. Good economic news in the United States contributed to oil reaching its highest price since May on August 17, with Benchmark Crude reaching $96.01, while Brent crude fell slightly to $113.71.

Early in September, a mix of bad economic news from the United States and good economic news from Europe caused the price of oil to fall slightly. On September 4, Benchmark Crude reached $95.41, with Brent crude at $114.84. The price of gas went down slightly to $3.82 but was still the highest ever for Labor Day weekend. Hurricane Isaac contributed to a temporary spike in gas prices, but on September 12 gas once again rose, to $3.86, as refineries cut production prior to the switch from summer blend gasoline to winter blend. Benchmark Crude also reached its highest level since early May and continued to rise above $99 after Federal Reserve announcements of actions to improve the economy and the 2012 diplomatic missions attacks. Brent crude rose slightly to nearly $116. Early in October, the average gas price was $3.78 and falling, though still a record for the month. Late in the month, the average reached $3.62 after a 13-cent drop in a week, the most since November 2008. Brent crude was down $8 in the previous month. By the start of November, the average was $3.54, partly due to lower demand after Hurricane Sandy. Crude oil futures fell after Barack Obama was re-elected November 6. After Thanksgiving, lower U.S. oil inventories, good economic news in the United States and good news relating to the Greek bailout helped push Brent crude up to $111.04, and benchmark oil for January delivery to $87.92; benchmark oil reached $86.24 on November 28, and gas was $3.41.

On December 13, Brent crude was down to $109.20, while benchmark oil fell slightly due to U.S. fiscal cliff concerns and rose due to Federal Reserve efforts to help the U.S. economy, ending the day at $86.77. In mid-December, gas prices reached $3.25, the lowest for 2012. Oil was trading for between $84 and $90.

== 2013 ==
On January 17, with good economic news in the United States, Benchmark oil reached its highest level since September, going over $95. Brent crude rose above $110. Gas was at $3.29.

Refinery shutdowns led to a dramatic rise in gas prices. Late in February, gas was at $3.78, up 14 cents from a week earlier. On February 25, with European stock markets doing well, Benchmark crude for April rose above $94 after a significant drop the previous week due to news the Federal Reserve might end its stimulus efforts, making the dollar stronger. Brent crude was over $115. Two days later gas reached its highest point, $3.79 a gallon. By mid-April, with low demand expected due to negative economic news, gas was down to $3.56 as Brent crude fell to $103.04, its lowest price since July. With economic problems worldwide leading to low demand, gas prices fell 3% in April, the most in a month in ten years, to the lowest level for that month since 2010.

Before Memorial Day, when gas was $3.63, gas supplies fell even though oil supplies were the highest in 35 years. U.S. economic news was also negative. On May 30, Benchmark crude for July rose slightly to $93.61 after falling the previous day, and Brent crude fell slightly to $102.19. On June 5 the price of oil rose again with supplies lower. Benchmark crude rose above $94. The price of gas was $3.62. On June 12, the International Energy Agency said demand for oil would still rise in 2013, but not as much as previously believed due to the economy. Also, May OPEC production was the highest in seven months. Benchmark crude fell slightly to $95.31, and Brent crude rose to $103.27. On June 20, with the Federal Reserve stating that its stimulus program could end if the U.S. economy continued to improve, as well as economic problems in China, Benchmark crude fell below $97. Brent crude fell to $104.24.

On July 10, oil prices were the highest in more than a year as a result of lower supplies and trouble in Egypt. In the past week, Brent crude had climbed 7% to $108.51. Because too much oil was being produced for the infrastructure to handle it, West Texas Intermediate was lower than Brent crude for several years; it has returned to being consistent with Brent. On July 5 it reached $103.22. On July 19 with good economic news in the United States, Benchmark crude reached $108.05, while gas was $3.67, the highest on a Friday since March 22. Brent crude was at $108.07. Gas was $3.63 on August 1, though good economic news in the U.S., China and Europe meant oil was going up again after a decline the previous week. Benchmark crude reached $107.89, while Brent crude was $109.54. On August 16 Benchmark oil was $107.46 after six days of increases as Egypt's problems continued. The concern was access to the Suez Canal, which appears unlikely to be a problem but still concerns companies. Brent crude was $110.48 on August 19. On August 28 West Texas intermediate reached $110.10, the highest since May 2011, and Brent crude reached $116.61, its highest point since February 19, due to concern about U.S. involvement in Syria. Meanwhile, inventories in the United States had their biggest increase in four months. Benchmark crude rose to $107.56 on September 11 due to lower supplies after dropping due to hopes for a peaceful Syria solution; Brent crude rose to $111.50.

Gas was $3.59 at the start of the month, but at the end of September, the price of gas was $3.39, the lowest for the time of year since 2010. The New York Mercantile Exchange price on September 27 was $102.87. Refineries had no hurricanes or other problems. Benchmark crude fell to $103.31 on October 3 after the U.S. government shutdown, and Brent crude was $109. On October 21, Benchmark crude was $99.22, the first time below $100 since July. Higher supplies and fewer threats from the Middle East were the reasons. Brent crude was $109.64 and gas reached $3.35. On November 13, Brent crude reached $107.12 and was $13.24 higher than West Texas Intermediate, the largest difference since April, due to trouble in Libya and sanctions against Iran. On November 25, Benchmark crude decreased to $93.92 while Brent crude reached $110.41 after the agreement regarding Iran's nuclear program. On December 16, Benchmark crude rose to $97.44 and Brent crude reached $110.53 with good economic news from Europe and more Libya trouble. Gas was $3.23, three cents higher than a month earlier. On December 27, due to a better economy in the United States leading to higher demand, oil closed about $100 for the first time since October. Gas was $3.27, two cents below a year earlier.

== See also ==
- 2014–2016 world oil market chronology
- 2017–2019 world oil market chronology
- 2020–2022 world oil market chronology
- 2023–2025 world oil market chronology
- 2026–2028 world oil market chronology
