= 2014–2016 world oil market chronology =

Events affecting the oil market

== 2014 ==
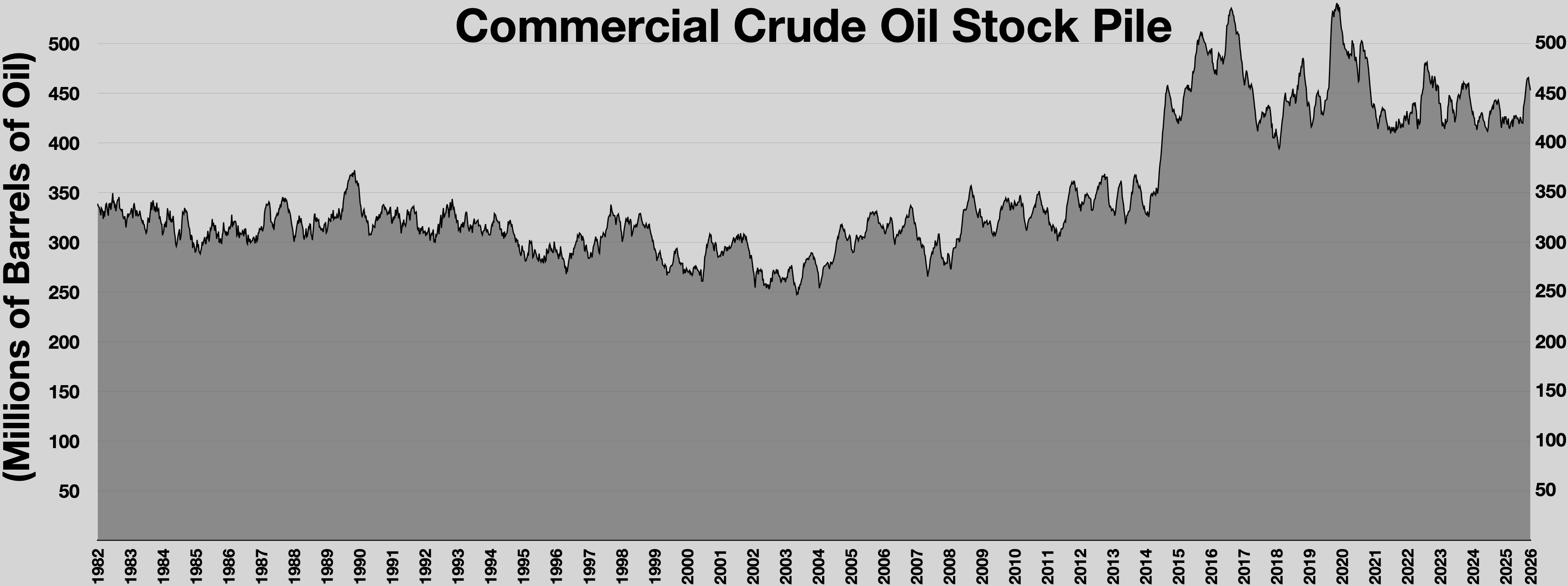
Commercial Crude Oil Stock Pile

On January 2, benchmark crude fell by the most in one day since November 2012 to close at $95.44. Brent crude was $107.78. Gas was $3.33. With the Iran agreement and increased production from Libya and the North Sea, Benchmark oil was around $92 on January 13 and Brent crude was $105.98. After good economic news from Japan, Benchmark crude fell slightly from its highest close of 2014, $98.23 on January 30. Brent crude fell to $107.25. The difference between the two fell below $10 for the first time since November, partly due to cold weather in the United States which resulted in high heating oil demand. Early in February gas was $3.27. Cold weather led to the price of oil staying above $100 for most of February, but lower prices were expected. With United States fourth quarter economic growth expected to be lower than an early estimate, Benchmark crude fell slightly on February 27 to $102.40, with Brent crude reaching $108.61. On March 24, due to the dispute over Crimea, problems in Libya, and the Houston Ship Channel collision, Benchmark crude rose above $100 and Brent crude rose to $107.41. Economic problems in China kept prices from going even higher. Later in the week, good economic news from the United States, lower oil supplies in Oklahoma and a force majeure by Shell Nigeria pushed prices slightly higher, to $102.12 for Benchmark crude and $108.29 for Brent. On April 7, Benchmark crude fell below $101 and Brent crude fell to $105.64 with news that Libya might open more terminals in May, but more Ukraine problems pushed the prices back up on April 8. Gas was $3.59, matching the level in 2013.

Continued Ukraine problems pushed oil higher on April 24, with Benchmark crude at $101.94 and Brent crude at $110.33, though an April 23 report said U.S. oil supplies were higher than expected. The price of gas was $3.68.5, the highest since March 2013. On April 30, Benchmark crude dropped below $100 for the first time in three weeks as oil supplies continued to rise and the unusually cold winter resulted in negative U.S. economic news. Gas was up 14 cents for the month, the most in three years. More Ukraine trouble pushed Benchmark crude above $100 and Brent crude over $108 on May 12, and further problems in Libya helped push Benchmark crude over $102 and Brent crude over $110 by May 15, though negative economic news in the U.S. and an unexpected increase in oil stockpiles pushed Benchmark crude back down temporarily. Continued concerns over Ukraine and Libya pushed oil back above $104. The price of gas was $3.65.

Trouble in Iraq resulted in higher prices for oil and gas in June. West Texas crude reached $106 and Brent crude $115.75. At the end of the month Benchmark crude was just above $105 while Brent crude fell below $113. The price of gas was $3.66.

After three weeks of going down, U.S. crude fell below $100 for the first time since May on July 15. However, with Middle East and Ukraine problems sending oil higher, Benchmark crude finished July 18 just above $103, with Brent crude staying above $107. With low demand and plentiful supplies, and despite good economic news from China and the United States, Brent crude fell below $107 on July 24, and U.S. crude dropped to $102.10. On July 28, gas was $3.52, down five cents from a week earlier, due to refiners cutting prices. Two weeks later gas was $3.48, less than a year earlier. And on August 14, light sweet oil was $95.58, the lowest since January, while Brent crude reached $102.01, the lowest since June, after falling the most in one day since January. Production in Libya was up, and economic slowdowns were expected in Europe and China, making even lower prices likely.

As of Labor Day, gas was $3.41, 18 cents lower than in 2013. Low demand and high North American production cancelled out effects of troubles in the Middle East and Ukraine. West Texas crude was below $94 on August 27 and Brent crude below $103. On October 16, West Texas crude fell below $80 for the first time in more than two years, while Brent crude reached $82.60, the lowest since November 2010. OPEC Members were not expected to act as increases in the U.S. supply resulting from high tight oil (shale oil) production added to a worldwide surplus. On October 31, the average price of gas reached $3 and was expected to go below that figure for the first time since December 2010. Demand for oil was down and there were many new sources. United States oil production was up 70% since 2008, and Iraq and Canada were producing more. According to the Lundberg survey released December 7, gas was down 12 cents from two weeks earlier to $2.72. Demand was low while production was high, and the strong dollar contributed. With demand low in China and Europe and OPEC deciding not to cut back, West Texas Intermediate reached $63.50 on December 8, the lowest since July 2009, while Brent crude reached $66.90, a level not seen since October 2009. After Saudi Arabia oil minister Ali Al-Naimi said OPEC members could not cut production on their own, oil prices rose slightly December 18 but finished the day lower with Benchmark crude at $54.11 and Brent crude $59.27, both the lowest since May 2009. Gas was $2.49 a gallon. Days later gas was $2.38, the lowest in five years, after 89 straight days of going down, the longest continuous decline ever according to AAA. The price of oil was down 50% since April, while gas had fallen 36%. Economic problems in Europe and Asia, high gas mileage, a strong dollar, higher U.S. production and no action by OPEC have been credited.

== 2015 ==
On January 16, Brent crude rose as high as $50.16 before falling back, and the International Energy Agency said production was down due to lower prices and higher prices were likely late in 2015. West Texas Intermediate, down 10% for the month, closed at $48.48 on January 14 after closing at $45.89 the previous day. Gas was $2.12.

After the January 23 death of King Abdullah led to concerns about the future, West Texas Intermediate climbed as high as $47.76 and Brent crude reached $49.80.

From January 30 to February 3, oil rose 20%, but on February 4, U.S. crude futures fell 8.7% to $48.45, the most in one day since November 28, 2014. Brent crude fell from $59 to $54 two weeks after reaching $45. U.S. inventories were the highest since 1982, while the dollar was recovering from "its worst day in more than a year".

Although inventory remained high, Brent crude reached its highest price of 2015 on February 17, closing at $62.53 after reaching $63. Problems in the Middle East, especially Libya, contributed to the rise. Fighting in Ukraine was also a factor.

At the end of February, with refineries changing to summer blend, the price of gas was $2.37, up from $2.03 in January. Other factors included an explosion at a Torrance, California refinery and a strike involving steel workers at 20 refineries.

On March 13, oil declined 5% for a total drop of 10% for the week. Benchmark crude reached $45.16 and Brent crude was $56.24. Supplies continued to increase and the price was expected to fall until changes by refineries for summer. Gas reached $2.46 March 7 but fell to $2.44 a week later. U.S. inventories were the highest since records had been kept, but on March 18, with the Federal Reserve indicating interest rates would not rise quickly, oil prices increased 6%.

Brent crude rose 16% in April, reaching $64.95, its highest price for 2015, on April 16. U.S. crude was $56.62 on April 17. Reasons were a drop in expected tight oil (shale oil) production in the United States and the war in Yemen. Gas was $2.41, up a penny in a week.

On May 5, gas reached $2.63 after rising for 19 days; gas was going up faster than oil, which reached its highest 2015 price, $61.10 for U.S. crude and $68.40 for Brent crude, before settling at $60.40 and $67.52 respectively. The dollar was lower but different sources conflicted over whether U.S. inventories were down for the first time in 2015, or up as they had been.

West Texas Intermediate closed slightly higher at $58.98 on May 19, and Brent crude rose slightly to just over $65 as U.S. supplies, still near records, fell while refineries increased production. On May 26, gas was $2.74.

On June 10, West Texas Intermediate reached $61.43, the highest price since December. Demand was expected to stay high, but OPEC production was also staying high. Brent crude was $65.70 while gas was $2.76.

On July 1, with an increase in U.S. inventory for the first time in two months, U.S. benchmark oil fell by the most in one day since April 8 to $56.26, the lowest since April 22, while Brent crude fell to $62.01. Gas was $2.77.

Oil fell by about $10 in July as the U.S. dollar was strong, supplies were high, and the Chinese stock market was down. Near the end of the month, Brent crude reached $53.31, close to the lowest in six months, while U.S. crude, at $48.52, was close to a four-month low, and gas was $2.69. A week later, with supplies high and summer driving in the United States ending, oil fell below $45, close to the six-year low reached in March. Brent crude was below $50. Gas was $2.64.

On August 11, U.S. crude reached $43.08, its lowest price since February 2009. Brent crude was below $50. Gas was $2.59. On August 26, U.S. crude reached $38.60, once again its lowest price since February 2009, before jumping more than 10% the next day to $42.56 for its biggest increase in one day since March 2009. Brent crude was up 10% to $47. U.S. supplies had fallen dramatically, especially in Cushing, Oklahoma. Gas was $2.56, the lowest at this time of year since 2004, though refinery problems kept it from being lower.

During August, Brent reached a low of $42.23 and U.S. crude was as low as $37.75. Then U.S. crude jumped 28% in 3 days, the most since 1990. Brent crude also climbed 28% above $54, the highest in a month.

On September 11, Goldman Sachs predicted continued surpluses and falling prices, and U.S. crude fell to $44.74 while Brent crude reached $47.93. Gas was $2.37.

A drop in supplies from Cushing, speculation about Federal Reserve action on interest rates, and U.S. help for Kurds in Syria contributed to a rise in U.S. crude to $47.15, while Brent was $50.

On September 25, the price of gas was $2.29. On September 29, with U.S. crude inventories up and Cushing supplies falling more slowly, West Texas Intermediate finished at $45.23, with Brent crude falling to $47.97.

After an International Energy Agency prediction of high supplies for the next year, U.S. crude fell the most in a week in more than two months, ending October 15 below $47, and Brent crude had its biggest loss for a week in nearly two months, just under $50 on October 16. With Middle Eastern countries producing more oil than needed and Iran expected to add even more as a result of the nuclear deal, as well as slow growth in China, U.S. crude fell below $46 on October 19 and Brent crude reached $48,51 early October 20. Gas was $2.25.

On November 4, prices fell over 3% as a result of higher U.S. inventories and U.S. output, before rising slightly, Brent crude recovering to $48.76 and West Texas Intermediate reaching $46.37. Gas was $2.19, the lowest for the time of year since 2004.

On November 19, U.S. crude fell below $40, and Brent crude slipped below $44. Gas was $2.13. Higher demand, winter weather in the United States and a promise by Saudi Arabia to work toward stabilizing prices sent West Texas Intermediate back over $42 and Brent crude over $44 on November 23.

On the first week of December Brent crude fell to $42.43 and U.S. crude slipped below $40 after OPEC first said it would increase production and then decided not to make changes. Other factors were a weak dollar and a strong Euro.

On December 11, oil fell to $35.62. The next day, gas was $2.02, the lowest in over six years.

On December 21, Brent crude fell as low as $36.35 a barrel; this was the lowest price since July 2004. U.S. crude rose slightly to $36.14. Gas fell below $2 for the first time since 2009.

On December 30 with U.S. supplies still high, light sweet crude fell to $36.60, while Brent crude reached $36.46. Oil ended the year down 30%.

== 2016 ==
On January 6, 2016, the price of WTI crude hit another eleven-year low, as it dropped to 32.53 a barrel for the first time since 2009. On January 12, in its seventh losing day, crude oil dropped below $30 for the first time since December 2003, ending the day at $30.44, as gas fell below $1.97. Brent crude hit $27.10 on January 20, the lowest since November 2003. Oil rose again before falling January 25, Brent crude reaching $30.86 and U.S. oil $30.68. After OPEC encouraged production cuts and U.S. GDP data suggested fewer interest rate increases, U.S. oil had four days of gains to finish January at $33.62. Brent was $34.74. Gas was $1.81, the lowest since January 2009. A February 7 meeting between Ali al-Naimi of Saudi Arabia and Eulogio Del Pino of Venezuela failed to produce desired results, and oil fell the next day, with Brent crude at $33.53 by noon and U.S. crude at $30.27.

On February 11, U.S. crude reached $26.21 after reaching $26.05, its lowest price since May 2003. The next day oil rose 12.3 percent to $29.44, the most in one day since February 2009. Investors wanted to be ready when the price started going up. Also, OPEC was "ready to cooperate" on lower production.

On February 22, Benchmark U.S. crude rose 6.2% to $31.48 and Brent crude went up 5.1% to $34.69 after news that supplies were expected to grow more slowly. By the end of the week, WTI was up 3% to $32.78, and Brent was up 7% to $35.12 after rising as high as $37, the most since January 5. Pipeline outages in Nigeria and Iraq, a lower number of active U.S. rigs, and lower gasoline inventories for the first time since November were reasons. Gas was $1.73, down 10 cents from the previous month, but with the switch to summer blend in California, gas was $2.34 and on its way back up.

After inventories fell faster than expected, U.S. crude was $37.94 on March 9, while Brent crude was up again to $40.84 after six straight up days and its highest level in three months the previous day then a 3% drop due to concerns about too much oil. Prices were up 25% after major oil producers said they would keep supplies at January levels.

After reducing the number of rigs for 12 weeks, U.S. producers added one rig with oil up 50%. With gasoline demand up, Brent crude reached its highest level of the year at $42.54 before falling to $41.20 March 18 in its fourth straight week of gains. U.S. crude also reached a high at $41.20 before falling to $39.44, ending its fifth straight week higher. Gas was $2.02, up 17 cents in 2 weeks.

On March 31, U.S. crude reached $37.57, the lowest since March 31, as the country's supply hit a record for the seventh week. Brent crude was $38.81.

In the first week of April with a weak dollar, oil jumped 7%, with Benchmark crude reaching $39.72 and Brent at $41.94. The next Tuesday, Brent hit $43.58, the highest of the year.

With a planned meeting of oil producers to discuss keeping output where it was, on April 15 oil fell over 3%, with U.S. crude reaching $40.33 by midday and Brent at $42.82.

With high demand in the U.S., lower production worldwide and problems in oil fields, oil rose for the third straight week, with Brent crude rising 4.5% for the week to $45.11 and West Texas Intermediate up more than 8% at $43.73.

On April 26, U.S. inventories were down after analysts had expected a supply increase, and the dollar was weak. U.S. crude was up 3% to $44.04 while Brent crude was up to $45.74.

The fire in Canada, attacks in Nigeria, and economic problems and the Zika virus in Venezuela led to supply problems and the highest prices in seven months on May 16. With U.S. supplies down more than predicted, WTI reached $49.56 on May 25, the highest since October. Brent crude was $49.74.

On June 7, with the dollar lower and interest rates not expected to rise after U.S. economic news, Benchmark crude closed over $50 for the first time since July 21. Brent crude was $51.44.

With the June 23 United Kingdom vote to leave the European Union, U.S. oil fell $2.05 to $48.06 and Brent crude fell $2.13 to $48.78.

Gas was $2.29 on June 30, the lowest for the July 4 holiday in 13 years.

On July 7, although supplies were down, they were not as low as forecast, and U.S. crude reached $47.20, down 4.7%. Brent crude reached $46.27, the lowest since May 11.

For the week ending July 15, crude supplies fell, but gasoline supplies rose. After gains on July 20, WTI fell to $44.75 and Brent crude went down to $46.20. Gas was $2.19, the lowest since 2004 at that time of year.

On August 5, WTI fell to $41.52 as the dollar rose as a result of better U.S. job news than expected, while Brent crude fell to $43.95. Oil prices had fallen more than 20% since June and were rising earlier in the week. On the week ending August 12, Benchmark crude rose 6.4%, and it went over $45 on August 15. Brent crude was $47.59. Gas was $2.12.

On August 31, U.S. government data showed a higher than expected increase in oil supplies, and the prediction that supplies would stay high. If the Fed raised interest rates, a higher dollar and lower oil prices would result. U.S. crude fell to $43.16 on September 1, its lowest level in 3 weeks. Brent reached $45.52. Oil had gone up 11% for the month with the expectation that OPEC would limit production.

Colonial Pipeline lost a major pipeline September 9 after a leak. As of September 19, the national average was up 2 cents to $2.20, though some areas, especially in the Southeast, saw increases of 20 to 30 cents. The pipeline returned to service after completion of a bypass on September 21.

On September 23, Brent crude fell slightly to $45.89 in anticipation of a September 26 OPEC meeting. On September 29, WTI rose to $47.83 and Brent crude hit $49.24 after OPEC's decision to decrease production resulted in the biggest gains since April.

Oil ended September higher for the second month. With the dollar strong after improvement in the U.S. economy, and stock markets weak, West Texas Intermediate fell October 3 after reaching $48.87, the highest point since July 5. Brent crude fell after hitting $50.90, its highest in six weeks.

On October 10, with Russia planning to join OPEC and Algeria saying others should, Brent crude reached its highest point in a year at $53.73, while WTI hit $51.60, the highest since June 9. A week later, with supplies high and added U.S. production capacity, WTI fell just below $50 and Brent crude ended the day at $51.16. With lower inventories, on October 19 WTI reached $51.93, the highest since July 2015, while Brent crude reached $53.14.

After an October 29 meeting by both OPEC members and nonmembers on the agreement to limit output resulted only in an agreement to meet again on November 30, and with high inventories at Cushing, Brent crude reached $48.17, the lowest since September 29, and WTI was down to $46.86, its lowest since September 27.

A strong dollar and higher than expected U.S. and world supplies led to an end to rising prices on November 17, with U.S. crude reaching $45.52 and Brent crude $46.26. Then oil reached its highest point in 3 weeks on November 21, with Brent crude up 11% in a week, reaching $49, after Saudi Arabia began attempting to persuade other OPEC countries to participate in its plan, while WTI reached $47.80. OPEC countries met November 30 and agreed to limit output for the first time since 2008. As a result, Brent crude went over $50, the highest in a month, while West Texas intermediate stopped just short of $50.

Brent reached $57.89 and U.S. crude reached $54.51 on December 12, both the highest since July 2015, after Russia and other countries not part of OPEC also agreed to limit production. For the week ending December 16, U.S. oil supplies, expected to fall, actually rose. WTI fell to $52.49 and Brent crude ended December 21 at $54.46.

On December 27, the first day of trading after Christmas, with the output reduction to start January 1, Brent crude hit $56.09 and U.S. crude CLc1 reached $53.90. With a continued increase in U.S. supplies and nine weeks of increases in oil rigs, oil fell slightly at the end of the week, with WTI ending the year at $53.72 for a 45% gain, and Brent at $56.82, up 52%. Both gains were the most since 2009.

== See also ==
- 2011–2013 world oil market chronology
- 2017–2019 world oil market chronology
- 2020–2022 world oil market chronology
- 2023–2025 world oil market chronology
- 2026–2028 world oil market chronology
