= 2017–2019 world oil market chronology =

== 2017 ==
Despite the promises of lower output from other countries, no evidence of changes was seen. U.S. output was higher. Also, China's economic problems caused concern. Brent fell 3% in the second week of the year to $55.45. WTI fell to $52.37 for a nearly 3% loss. On January 18, with a strong dollar and expectations of higher U.S. production, Brent fell to $53.92 and WTI to $51.08. With U.S. production and inventories up, even a lower dollar and decreased production by OPEC nations did not cause oil prices to rise as much as they could have. WTI reached $53.07 and Brent $55.44 on January 26.

On February 8, the U.S. Energy Information Administration reported the second-largest increase in oil supplies, the day after WTI reached $52.17 and Brent reached $55.05, the lowest in three weeks for both, thanks to a strong dollar. Still, prices moved higher on February 8. With the increase in U.S. supplies and OPEC's plan to keep cutting production, oil ended the next week down, with WTI at $53.40 and Brent crude at $55.81.

On February 22, Qatar oil minister Mohammed Saleh Al Sada said countries not in OPEC were not cutting production as much as expected, and oil fell as a result. Continued increases in U.S. crude inventories also contributed to a decline, with WTI at $53.59 and Brent at $55.76.

After U.S. inventories reached a record at the end of February, oil fell for three straight days and closed at its lowest level in nearly a month, with WTI at $52.61 and Brent at $55.08. Oil continued to fall, with Brent crude reaching $51.50, the lowest since November 30, on March 9, a day after a 5% drop, the most it had moved in a day all year. WTI fell more than 5% March 8 and closed at $49.28 the next day, the lowest since November. WTI fell to $47.36 on March 14, while Brent crude reached $50.25, before lower inventories resulted in higher prices. Crude inventories set a record but gasoline inventories went down more than expected and summer gasoline demand was expected to increase, so while WTI fell to just over $47 on March 22, it finished the day at $48.04. Brent crude fell below $50 but recovered to $50.64. On March 30 with Kuwait's support for continuing OPEC production cuts, U.S. crude rose above $50 for the first time in three weeks, with Brent crude reached $52.92. Despite high U.S. crude inventories while gasoline inventories moved lower, prices continued to rise, reaching their highest point since March 8 on April 6, with WTI reaching $51.70 and Brent crude $54.89. After Saudi Arabia announced plans to continue lower production beyond the first half of 2017, on April 12, WTI reached $53.36 and Brent crude reached $56.40. On April 14, gas was $2.41, up 33 cents from a year earlier.

On April 19, oil fell 3.8% with the news of an unexpected increase in U.S. gasoline supplies and the news that U.S. crude supplies fell less than they should have with production at its highest since August 2015. WTI still remained above $50 while Brent crude closed just under $53. On April 24, WTI fell below $50 and Brent crude closed at $51.60 due to doubts about OPEC extending production cuts and a statement by Russia that it would increase production.

Despite plans to extend production cuts, on May 4, oil fell to its lowest level since November, with WTI falling to $45.52 and Brent crude reaching $48.26. But with the news that Saudi supplies to Asia were less than expected, and with U.S. inventories down the most since December, and despite higher production from non-OPEC nations reducing demand for OPEC oil, Brent crude finished at $50.72 on May 11 and U.S. light crude rose more than 1% to $47.83.

With expectations production cuts would continue, Brent crude was up for the second week and WTI finished May 18 at $49.35, its highest close since April 26. On May 25, all countries agreed to continue cuts but Brent crude still fell 4%. And despite a sharp drop in U.S. inventories, oil fell another 1% on June 2, with Brent crude reaching $50.25 and WTI down to $47.91.

By June 9, Brent crude was at $47.67, down 12% from May 25, and WTI was at $45.44, down 11%, with limits on production not having the expected effect as supplies continued to rise. OPEC actually increased production and on June 14, Brent crude fell to $48.25 and WTI to $45.94. Excessive worldwide supplies and high U.S. production led to the fourth straight down week as Brent crude finished June 16 at $47.37 and WTI rose to $44.74, a day after oil reached its lowest level in six months. Prices rose slightly with news that although American producers added rigs for a record 22 weeks, the rate of increase was slowing, and that some countries were starting to export less.

With production increasing in Nigeria and Libya, even though U.S. supplies of oil and gasoline were down, Brent crude rose slightly to $44.91 after reaching its lowest point since November, and WTI reached $42.53, its lowest since August, on June 21. With U.S. inventories again continuing to increase and gasoline supplies up despite increased demand, Brent crude fell to $46.32 and WTI reached $43.86 on June 28.

After eight days of gains due to an expected end in a rise in U.S. production, Brent crude fell to $49.43 and WTI to $46.85 on July 4. On July 7, even though U.S. oil and gasoline inventories fell late in June, with both OPEC and U.S. production up, Brent crude fell to $47.53 and WTI to $44.95. The next week, Brent crude rose 3.5% to $48.24 and WTI 4% to $45.98 as U.S. inventories continued to fall and U.S. production forecasts were cut, though oil inventories were still high, reducing gains from earlier in the week; Sanford C. Bernstein speculated OPEC nations may not have made the cuts intended. On July 31, Brent crude reached $52.93, its highest point since May. With record demand reported in the United States and lower inventories along with good news on U.S. jobs but continued high production from OPEC nations, on August 4, WTI ended the week at $49.58 and Brent crude reached $52.42 after almost reaching a 10-week high earlier in the week. Both were down less than 1% for the week.

Oil reached its highest level in two and a half months on August 9 but OPEC and exempt nations Nigeria and Libya reported increased output, and oil fell 1.5%, with WTI back below $50 at $48.62 and Brent crude at $51.91 early the next day.

Oil fell 2.5%, more than expected, on August 14. Early the next day WTI was $47.65 and Brent crude was $50.79, both up slightly. Lower production by Libya and China were reported, and a stronger dollar resulted from North Korea delaying a decision to fire a missile toward Guam.

On August 23, oil fell slightly due to higher Libya output, while U.S. gasoline supplies higher than expected even though crude inventories fell, with WTI at $47.63 and Brent crude at $51.61. However, Hurricane Harvey led to higher gas prices and to a reduction of nearly 25% in refinery capacity and 15% in U.S. production. Brent crude fell slightly to $50.93 on August 29, but the difference between Brent and U.S. CLc1 reached the highest level in over two years before declining to $4.92. While Harvey has had little effect on crude prices, the price of gas reached $2.59 on September 2, up 17.5 cents since August 23 and 16.7% higher than 2016, with more dramatic increases in states dependent on the Colonial Pipeline, which closed until inspection was complete. As of September 11, the price of gas was $2.67.

Brent crude rose 40% from June to October as oil producers were expected to continue lower production, with an increase of 20% in the third quarter, the most for the quarter since 2004, and reaching $59.49 during the final week of September. The increase that week resulted from a threat by Turkey to close a pipeline as a result of the Kurdistan vote for independence. Turkey did not act and oil fell 6% to $56.00 (including a 2.5% drop on October 1) as a result of investors taking advantage of higher prices and forecasts for increased U.S. tight oil (shale oil) production. U.S. CLc1 fell only slightly to $50.42.

On October 12, with U.S. supplies up, WTI was $51.01 and Brent crude $56.65. After four days of higher prices, oil dropped significantly October 19 and rose slightly the next day, with WTI reaching $51.41 and Brent at $57.31. U.S. oil inventories were down 15% since March and lower than in 2016 due to higher exports resulting from WTI being significantly lower than Brent. However, threats to oil supplies due to fighting in Kurdistan were less than feared.

On November 1, WTI reached the highest level since 2015 before settling at $54.30. The next week, WTI reached $57.92, highest since July 2015, and Brent crude $64.65, highest since June 2015. Demand was high, and OPEC cuts and "rising political tensions" were other reasons.

On November 24, WTI reached $59.05, the highest in two years, due to the Keystone Pipeline closing, and optimism about the OPEC deal extension. Gas was $2.52. On November 27, U.S. CLc1 fell 1.4%, finishing the next day at $57.99, with Brent crude at $63.61. Crude supplies had risen the previous week after forecasts for an increase. There was concern about a November 30 meeting to extend OPEC production cuts, while Russia was expected to increase production.

A strong dollar caused prices to fall slightly December 8, with WTI at $56.64 and Brent crude at $62.09. With an outage on the Forties crude pipeline in Great Britain, prices were staying high. Oil fell slightly on December 11 with WTI at $57.10 and Brent crude $63.08 as U.S. production reached levels not seen since the 1970s and the number of rigs continued to increase.

During the last week of 2017, WTI went over $60 for the first time since June 2015 before falling back to $59.69, while Brent crude passed $67 for the first time since May 2015 before falling to $66.50. Pipeline problems in Libya and the North Sea added to production cuts by OPEC and Russia.

== 2018 ==
Both WTI and Brent began the year above $60 for the first time since 2014. Later in the week WTI reached $62.21 and Brent $68.27, both the highest since May 2015. Protests in Iran added to other factors that were keeping prices high. With U.S. inventories the lowest in three years, and cold weather decreasing U.S. production, oil reached its highest price since December 2014 in mid-January. On January 15, Brent reached $70.37, and the next day, WTI hit $64.89. U.S. production increased and demand was predicted to go down when winter was over, so prices went down. With U.S. crude supplies up for the first time in 11 weeks, WTI ended January at $64.73 after falling for two straight days for the second time in the month.

In February, with U.S. crude supplies up, WTI fell to $61.79, the lowest level in a month, and Brent fell below $66 for the first time in 2018.

With both crude oil stocks and gasoline inventories up, and U.S. production at a high, WTI finished February down 4.8%, the first loss for a month since August, and Brent finished down 4.7%. With reports of higher U.S. crude inventories, a stronger dollar and the stock market down (partly the result of the resignation of Gary Cohn), oil fell 2% March 7, with WTI reaching $61.21 and Brent $64.34. Crude oil supplies continued to rise and oil fell 1.2% early in the week of March 12, with WTI reaching $61.14 and Brent reaching $64.97 early March 15. Then crude supplies fell and WTI ended March 21 at $65.41 while Brent reached $69.47, both the highest since early February. WTI ended March at $64.94, up 5.6% for the month and 7.7% for the first quarter. Brent finished at $70.27 for an increase of 8.6% for the month and 6.3% for the quarter. One reason was concern over the United States putting sanctions on Iran once again. Also, OPEC wanted prices higher and intended to set targets for crude stocks accordingly. Production in Venezuela was down as well.

On April 11, with the United States planning a response to the Douma chemical attack in the Syrian Civil War, WTI ended the day at $66.82, with Brent at $72.04, both the highest since December 2014.

WTI fell from $69.56 and Brent from $74.74, both the highest since November 2014, on a week when U.S. inventories were lower and gasoline demand was higher.

WTI ended May 18 down slightly at $71.28 but still higher for the third week after reaching its highest level in three and half years twice. Brent rose for the sixth week in a row, the most since 2011, finishing at $78.51 after going over $80 for the first time since November 2014 the previous day. The threat of more sanctions on Iran, the lowest OPEC petroleum stocks in three years, and supply problems in Venezuela were reasons.

Prior to Memorial Day, the number of active U.S. oil rigs increased and WTI fell 4% to $67.88, while Brent fell 3% to $76.44, the lowest since May 8. Media reports indicate OPEC will increase production. Gas was $2.97, the highest of the year.

With OPEC's announcement that it would keep production low through the rest of 2018, WTI rose from its lowest close since April 17 to finish May 30 at $68.21 after five straight days of decline, the longest streak since February. Brent finished at $77.50. The difference between WTI and Brent was increasing, possibly due to tight oil (shale oil).

On June 14, WTI reached $66.89, its highest settlement in two weeks as a result of the largest U.S. supply drop since March, though not as high as it could have been due to record U.S. production for the week. Brent fell to $75.94 due to expectations of higher production from OPEC.

On June 22, WTI finished at $68.58, up 4.6%, and Brent was up 3.4% to $75.55, after OPEC said it would cut production, and U.S. supplies fell with the first reduction in the number of rigs in three months.

WTI ended the first half of 2018 up about 23% to $74.15, the highest since November 2014, up 14% for the second quarter and 11% for the month. Brent was $79.44, the highest since May. Factors included threats to supplies from Libya and proposed sanctions on countries importing oil from Iran. With expectations of increased production worldwide, Brent dropped more than 2% on July 2 to $77.30, while WTI fell slightly to $73.94 due to lower U.S. supplies and Libya exports. For the week ending July 13, WTI fell 3.8% to $71.01 after falling below $70 on July 12. Brent fell 2.3% to $75.33 after reaching $73.40 on July 11, a day when the return of oil from Libya and a change in attitudes toward Iran sanctions led to a nearly 7% drop. Lower U.S. supplies were less of a factor.

WTI rose to $69.46 on July 19 with the announcement that Saudi Arabia exports were expected to fall to prevent oversupply and news of lower than expected U.S. gasoline supplies, but Brent fell to $72.58 with the end of a strike by Norwegian oil workers.

The biggest one-day decline in oil prices in three weeks happened August 8 as crude supplies fell less than expected and demand in China also fell. WTI fell 3.2% from $69.17, the highest since July 30, to $66.91, the lowest since June 21. Brent also fell by 3.2%, to $72.28, the lowest since July 17. WTI fell 3% on August 15 to $65.01 for its lowest close since June 6, while Brent fell 2.4% to $70.76, the lowest since April 9. Crude inventories were rising despite a forecast they would fall. Then oil rose for five straight days, with WTI reaching $67.86, the highest in two weeks, and Brent reached $74.78, the highest since July 30, as U.S. crude supplies fell more than expected. Possible sanctions on Iran have also contributed. On August 28, WTI fell slightly to $68.53 from its highest finish since August 7; there had been increases seven of the previous nine days. Brent was also down a few cents to $75.95 after the highest finish since July 10. sanctions on Iran and problems in Libya and Venezuela kept prices high. Gas was $2.24.

Despite lower U.S. crude supplies, a number of factors including lower expected demand, problems between the U.S. and China, higher U.S. gasoline and distillate supplies, and economic problems in emerging markets contributed to the lowest finish since August 21 for WTI at $67.77 on September 6. Brent was $76.55. With Hurricane Florence weakening, higher OPEC output and record supplies worldwide, on September 13, WTI fell 2.5% from $70.37, the highest since July 20, while Brent crude fell 2% to $78.17 from the highest since May.

WTI rose nearly 3% October 1 to finish at $75.30, the highest since November 2014, while Brent reached $84.98, the most since October 2014, with the agreement to replace NAFTA and lower Iranian production given as reasons. WTI finished the third quarter down 1.2% but rose 3.5% in its last week, while Brent was up 4.1% for the quarter and 5% for the week. With OPEC production up, on October 4, WTI fell by the largest percentage in a day since August but still ended higher for the fourth week in a row, at $74.90. Brent was $84.72 after falling 2%. WTI finished at $71.34, down 4% for the week ending October 12, because of higher output and concerns about an economic slowdown. Brent was $80.34. With the fourth increase in U.S. crude supplies, and despite lower production due to Hurricane Michael, on October 18 WTI closed at $68.65, the lowest since September 13, after falling 4% over 2 days. Brent fell to $79.29, lowest since September 21. WTI fell 2.4% to $67.59 in the week ending October 26, the third down week, and Brent fell 2.7% to $77.62, due to higher production and worries about the world economy. The U.S. became the leading world oil producer, exceeding 11 million barrels a day for the first time ever. This along with the highest OPEC production since 2016 led to WTI dropping 2.5% on November 1 to $63.69, its lowest finish since April, after falling 10.8% in October. Brent fell 2.9% to $72.79, the lowest since August 21 and lower than the 200-day average for the first time since September 2017, after an 8.8% fall in October. Both benchmarks fell the most for a month since July 2016.

Possible reductions in oil production, weak growth worldwide and the Trump administration policy of making exceptions to sanctions against Iran, for some buyers of Iranian oil all contributed to oil's sixth weekly loss. WTI dropped 6.2% for the week ending November 16 despite falling to $55.69 on November 13, the lowest close since November 16, 2017. Brent reached $66.76 on November 16, down 4.9%, after falling to $65.47 on November 13.

Low demand and high U.S. inventories contributed to a 6.6% decline for WTI to $53.43, the lowest since October 26, 2017, on November 20. Brent fell 6.4% to $62.53, the lowest since February. At Thanksgiving, gas was $2.62, down more than 20 cents since the start of October. Oil fell the most for any month in ten years. WTI finished at $50.93, up 1% for the week but down 22% for the month, while Brent was $58.71, down 12% for the year. Higher production in the U.S., Russia and some OPEC countries meant too much supply. Losses would have been higher except for speculation about OPEC cuts.

For the week ending December 21, WTI fell 11.4% to $45.59, the lowest since July 2017, and Brent fell 10.7% to $53.82, the lowest since September 2017. Higher U.S. interest rates, more active U.S. oil rigs, higher U.S. crude production and lower expected worldwide demand did not cancel out proposed production cuts by OPEC nations, including definite plans by Saudi Arabia. The same week, gas prices reached $2.37, the lowest in December in two years.

WTI ended 2018 at $45.41 a barrel, off 10.8% the month, 38% for the fourth quarter, and 24.8% for 2018. Brent finished at $53.80 off over 8% for the month, 35% for the quarter, and 19.5% for the year. U.S. crude supplies were down while gasoline supplies were higher.

== 2019 ==
Gasoline started 2019 at $2.23.

WTI jumped 5 percent to $52.58 early on January 9, and Brent crude reached $61.58, with an announcement of expected production cuts by Saudi Arabia, though higher U.S. gasoline stocks kept oil from going even higher. Over eight days, oil was up 17 percent. Oil finished January up 18.5 percent (the best ever with records going back as far as 1984) with WTI at $53.79 one day after its highest finish since November, and Brent up 15 percent for the month to $61.89; both gains were the most for a month since April 2016. U.S. crude supplies were lower than expected and sanctions on Venezuela also contributed, as well as interest rate policy which sent stocks higher and the dollar lower.

On the first week in February, WTI fell 4.6 percent, the most since December. Brent crude fell 1 percent. Reasons included an increase in U.S. oil rigs and efforts to get around Venezuela sanctions, as well as concerns over actions by OPEC nations. But WTI rose 5 percent the second week to $55.59, with Brent crude ending the week at $66.25, both the highest since November 19, with lower OPEC output and progress in trade talks between the United States and China.

WTI rose 6.4 percent in February while Brent crude went up 6.7 percent. On March 1, WTI fell 2.5 percent to end the week at $55.80 while Brent crude fell 1.9 percent to $65.07. This was true even though OPEC output reached its lowest level in four years. U.S. economic reports indicated slower growth.

On April 2, WTI closed at $62.58, its highest level since November 5, and Brent closed at $69.37, its highest since November 12. Brent ended the first week of April up 4.1 percent with its first close above $70 since November, and WTI was up for the fifth week, the longest streak since November 2017, finishing 4.9 percent higher at $63.08. Reasons included sanctions on Iran and Venezuela. U.S. inventories were down, but even a higher number of oil rigs did not cancel out the other factors. In the second week of April, WTI had its sixth gain for the week, while Brent had its third week with an increase. Both fell slightly April 15, WTI to $63.40 and Brent to $71.18, after a report Russian Finance Minister Anton Siluanov wondered if his country should continue participating in OPEC's lower production goals. U.S. crude production was "in record territory" and expected to go higher.

The third week of April, though short because of the Good Friday holiday, ended with WTI at $64 for its seventh gain for the first time since February 2014. Brent rose for the fourth week, ending at $71.97. This happened even though U.S. crude stocks fell. On April 22, WTI rose to $66.30, with the highest settlement since October resulting from the Trump administration ending waivers for Iranian oil exports, even though U.S. President Donald Trump tweeted that other countries would make up the difference. Though WTI fell due to higher U.S. crude supplies, Brent reached the highest close since October on April 24 before falling to $74.35 the next day. Gasoline reached $2.84 nationally and $4.70 in parts of California, finally reaching $2.91 on May 4 after rising 67 cents during 2019, the most since 2011 during the same period.

WTI fell for the third week, to $61.66 with Brent falling to $70.62 after Trump's tariffs on imports from China increased, despite lower U.S. crude inventories.

On May 23 when oil fell the most in a day since December (also falling below the 200-day moving average), WTI finished at $57.21, lowest since March 12, in a week when WTI lost nearly 7 percent; Brent finished the week at $68.69 for a nearly 5 percent loss. The declines for the week were the most all year. The trade war with China caused concerns, though possible actions by Trump helped slightly on May 24. Gas was $2.83, 14 cents lower than the previous Memorial Day.

Although oil went up 2 percent June 13 after attacks on tankers, for the week oil was down as a result of forecasts for lower worldwide demand, with WTI finishing at $52.51 and Brent at $62.01. The next week WTI rose almost 9 percent for the week, the most since December 2016, to $57.43, the highest finish for the month. Brent was up 5 percent to $65.20. Reasons for the jump included expectations of the Federal Reserve lowering interest rates and Iran shooting down a drone. Gas was $2.68, but expected to go higher, especially in the mid-Atlantic states, after a Philadelphia refinery fire.

Oil ended higher for the third of four weeks on July 12, WTI at $60.21 and Brent at $66.72 because of problems in the Middle East, lower U.S. inventories and Hurricane Barry. Both WTI and Brent reached their highest numbers since May. Other factors included OPEC nations continuing lower production into 2020, and manufacturing slowing in much of the world.

The next week oil fell 7.6 percent, the most since May, WTI ending the week at $55.63 and Brent down 6 percent to $62.50, due to high world supplies and less damage from Barry than feared. U.S. crude inventories went down for the sixth straight week, the most since the beginning of 2018, and decreased production caused by Barry ended, so WTI ended July 24 at $55.88 and Brent at $63.18.

WTI fell 7.9 percent on August 1, the most in one day in four years, to $53.95, the lowest since June 19. The next day WTI finished the week down, in response to Trump's plans for more tariffs. Brent fell 7 percent on August 1 and also ended the week lower.

U.S. oil supplies were down for the first time in three weeks and WTI fell slightly on August 21 to $55.68, while Brent went over $60 for the first time in a week. Gasoline supplies went up after being expected to go down. With China responding to Trump tariffs by adding tariffs of its own to American products, WTI ended the week down just over 1 percent, to $54.17. Gas was $2.59 after falling for five weeks straight. Patrick DeHaan, head of petroleum analysis at GasBuddy, said "[W]e suffer from a lack of clear direction.” Tom Kloza, global head of energy analysis at the Oil Price Information Service, said, "The threat of a presidential tweet that could dampen world demand is real".

Oil went up August 27 with less concern about the China trade war, less chance Iran could export oil, expectations of lower U.S. supplies, and many producers following OPEC guidelines. WTI was up 2.4 percent to $54.93 and Brent rose 1.4 percent to $59.51.

After three weeks of decreases in U.S. oil rigs and in U.S. crude supplies, WTI rose 2.6 percent to $56.32 on the first week of September, while Brent rose 3.9 percent to $61.54.

On September 14, the 2019 Abqaiq–Khurais attack caused the loss of 5 percent of the world's oil supply, and WTI jumped 14.7 percent, the most in one day since 2008, to $62.90, the highest since June. Brent rose by 14.6 percent, the most ever in one day, to $69.02. WTI rose 5.9 percent for the week, the most since June, to $58.09. Brent was up 6.7 percent, the most since January, to $64.28.

Saudi Arabia restored production to where it was before the attacks. WTI finished the quarter at $55.23, down 5.2 percent, and Brent was $60.23, up 3.1 percent for the month but down 5.5 for the quarter. Gas was $2.64, down several cents for the week.

After Trump announced a trade deal with China on October 11, oil fell 2 percent after reports that China wanted more talks before signing phase one of the deal. WTI had jumped 3.6 percent at the end of the week to the highest in two weeks before falling to $53.59. Brent rose 3.7 percent and then fell to $59.35. Slow growth in China and the fifth week of higher U.S. inventories led to a 1.7 percent loss for the week by WTI, ending the week at $53.78. Brent fell 1.8 percent to $59.42.

On October 25 WTI finished at $56.66, the highest level since Sept. 24, after going up 5.2 percent. Brent finished at $62.02, its highest level since Sept. 26, after going up 4.4 percent. Reasons included the lowest number of active U.S. oil rigs since April 2017 and a decline in U.S. oil inventories. Then WTI fell as low as $54.61 and Brent fell to $60.66 with U.S. crude inventories expected to rise and a Russian official claiming it was too early to talk about OPEC production cuts.

Oil reached its highest level in two months on November 21, with WTI at $58.58 and Brent at $63.98. Lower global supplies, partly the result of OPEC actions, were reasons, though high U.S. shale oil production and lower demand meant the trend might not continue.

Brent rose 1.4 percent on the week ending December 20 to $66.14. This was the sixth rise in seven weeks, and the third up week for WTI, which ended at $60.44. Reasons included OPEC plans for more cuts and positive expectations about the world economy and U.S. relations with China.

With U.S. crude inventories down more than predicted, WTI reached $61.68 on December 26, the highest since September, and Brent was at $67.92, also the most in over three months.

== See also ==
- 2011–2013 world oil market chronology
- 2014–2016 world oil market chronology
- 2020–2022 world oil market chronology
- 2026–2028 world oil market chronology
