= Profit taking =

In finance, profit taking (or taking profits) is the practice of selling an asset, mostly shares, when the asset has risen in price. This allows investors to convert the increase of an asset's market value into cash.

Profit taking by a number of investors normally causes the price of the asset in question to fall temporarily. Nevertheless, the occasion of profit taking itself indicates an upward market trend.

== Relation to capital gains and the disposition effect ==
Profit taking converts an unrealised gain into a realised capital gain when an investor sells an asset for more than its purchase price, before taking account of taxes, commissions, or other transaction costs. The decision to sell a profitable investment may be made for portfolio rebalancing, liquidity needs, risk reduction, or tax planning, rather than solely because the asset price has risen.

In behavioural finance, profit taking is related to the disposition effect, the tendency of investors to sell winning investments too early while holding losing investments too long. Research summarised by CFA Institute describes evidence that selling activity increases after large price changes, with the effect being stronger after price increases than after price decreases.
