= Abdullah S. Jum'ah =

Saudi Arabian technocrat (born 1941)

Abdallah S. Jum'ah

President and CEO, Saudi Aramco
- In office 1 January 1995 – 1 January 2009
- Preceded by: Ali Al-Naimi
- Succeeded by: Khalid A. Al-Falih

Personal details
- Born: al-Khobar, Saudi Arabia
- Education: Harvard University; American University of Beirut

Abdallah S. Jum'ah (Arabic: عبد الله بن صالح بن جمعة; born 1941) is a prominent Saudi business executive and the former president and CEO of Saudi Aramco, a position he held from January 1995 to December 2008.

He serves as a director of The Saudi Investment Bank and has been a director of Halliburton since 15 July 2010.

== Early life and education ==
Jum'ah was born in al-Khobar, a major city in the Eastern Province of Saudi Arabia, in 1941. He studied political science at American University of Cairo as well as at the American University of Beirut, where he earned his B.A. in political science in 1968. He completed the HBS Executive Program in Management Development at Harvard University, while working for Saudi Aramco.

Jum'ah was awarded an honorary doctorate by Hankuk University, Seoul in April 2007.

== Professional life ==
=== Early years at Aramco: 1968 - 1995 ===
After his graduation in 1968, Jum'ah joined Aramco (presently, Saudi Aramco), initially in the government affairs department and later in the public relations department as the general supervisor of publications. He was promoted to department manager in 1975.

He moved to Aramco's Power Systems department in 1977, where he began a series of leadership assignments and worked closely with the development of the Saudi Consolidated Electric Company (SCECO) for the Eastern Province - SCECO-East. He was appointed to his first executive position at Aramco in 1981 as vice president of the power systems division and concurrently served as the first Saudi Managing Director of SCECO-East.

In 1984, he became Aramco's vice president of government affairs and then promoted to senior vice president of industrial relations in 1988. That same year the company's name was changed to Saudi Arabian Oil Company (or, Saudi Aramco) to reflect a formal shift in management and operation's control of the company to the Saudi government. In 1991, he moved to Saudi Arabian Oil Company's International Operations and was named its executive vice president a year later. In this capacity, he gained considerable experience in marketing, industrial relations, and negotiations on an international level.

He led the company's downstream expansion, or international distribution of Saudi Aramco's products; his stated goals were to "protect and potentially increase the market share of Arabian crude, maximize the revenues from the sale of Arabian crude, and provide secure outlets through strategic alliances with refining companies in our major markets" . He was instrumental in the creation of joint ventures with international firms in the United States (1988), South Korea (1991), the Philippines (1994), and Greece (1995). He was named to the company's board of directors in 1994.

=== CEO of Saudi Aramco: 1995 - 2009 ===
In December 1995, by a royal decree, Jum'ah was named President and CEO of Saudi Aramco, when the then CEO - Ali Al-Naimi, was appointed minister of petroleum and mineral resources for the Kingdom of Saudi Arabia. In his new role, Jum'ah retained the American style of management, with a focus on innovation, and effectively tackled the challenges that the world witnessed post 9/11.

After four decades with Saudi Aramco and almost 14 years as its president and chief executive officer, he decided to retire from the company effective 1 January 2009. He was by succeeded by Khalid A. Al-Falih.

== Board memberships ==
Jum'ah currently serves as a director of The Saudi Investment Bank and of the Saudi Arabian Supreme Council of Petroleum and Mineral Affairs. On 15 July 2010, he was appointed as the Director, Member of Nominating & Corporate Governance Committee and Member of Health, Safety & Environment Committee of Halliburton.

He has served as the chairman of Motiva Enterprises, a joint venture of Saudi Aramco, Shell, and Texaco based in Houston, Texas and was on the boards of the U.S.-Saudi Arabian Business Council, Aramco Services Company, Saudi Refining, S-Oil, Petron Corporation, Motor Oil Hellas, and Saudi Petroleum International.

Jum'ah has been a trustee of the American University in Cairo since 1998. He was selected as winner of the prestigious Petroleum Executive of the Year Award for 2005.
