= Ahmed Zaki Yamani =

Saudi Arabian politician (1930–2021)

- أحمد زكي يماني
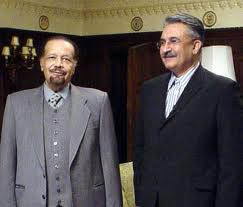
- Yamani (left), with Ali Akbar Abdolrashidi, 2004

Minister of Petroleum and Mineral Resources
- In office 9 March 1962 – 5 October 1986
- Preceded by: Abdullah Tariki
- Succeeded by: Hisham Nazer

Personal details
- Born: 30 June 1930 Mecca, Saudi Arabia
- Died: 23 February 2021 (aged 90) London, United Kingdom
- Education: Cairo University; New York University; Harvard Law School; University of Exeter

Ahmed Zaki Yamani (Arabic: أحمد زكي يماني; 30 June 1930 – 23 February 2021) was a Saudi Arabian politician who served as Minister of Petroleum and Mineral Resources under four Saudi monarchs from 1962 to 1986, and a minister in the Organization of the Petroleum Exporting Countries (OPEC) for 25 years.

With degrees from institutions including New York University School of Law, Harvard Law School, and a doctorate from the University of Exeter, Yamani became a close adviser to the Saudi government in 1958 and then became oil minister in 1962. He is known for his role during the 1973 oil embargo, when he spurred OPEC to quadruple the price of crude oil.

In December 1975, Yamani and the other OPEC ministers were taken hostage by the terrorist Carlos (the Jackal) in Vienna, Austria. The hostages were released after two days riding an airplane across North Africa, even though Carlos was ordered by his superiors to execute Yamani and his Iranian counterpart Jamshid Amouzegar.

Yamani was dismissed as the oil minister by King Fahd in October 1986. In 1990, Yamani founded the Centre for Global Energy Studies, a market analysis group, and remained involved in private investments and cultural foundations until his death in 2021.

== Early life and education ==
Ahmed Zaki Yamani was born in Mecca on 30 June 1930, the youngest of three children. His father, Hassan Yamani, was a Qadi in the Hejaz and a respected scholar of Islamic law, acting as Grand Mufti in Indonesia and Malaysia. His mother, Fatima Suruji, was a poet as well as a homemaker.

Yamani's grandfather was Grand Mufti in Turkey. The Yamani surname originates from Yemen from where his paternal ancestors originated.

Yamani earned a bachelor's degree in law at King Fouad I University in Cairo in 1951. Next, the Saudi government sent Yamani to New York University's Comparative Law Institute for non-American lawyers at NYU Law School and in 1955 he received a master's degree in comparative jurisprudence. With the help of an NYU professor, Yamani spent the next year at Harvard Law School earning his second master's in 1956.

== Career ==
Yamani returned to the Saudi Ministry of Finance, joining the new Department of Zakat and Income Tax. In 1959, Yamani was invited by Prince Faisal, then Crown Prince and Prime Minister, to work as a legal adviser to his office. When King Saud returned to full power in 1960 with the support of the Free Princes, however, Faisal resigned as Prime Minister and Yamani returned to his law practice and began teaching at the University of Riyadh. According to Yamani, King Saud then offered him the position of oil minister but he declined. Several months later a new cabinet was formed with Faisal as Crown Prince and Deputy Prime Minister and in March 1962 the incumbent oil minister and founding father of OPEC, Abdullah Tariki, was replaced by Yamani.

In 1962 the General Petroleum and Mineral Organization (Petromin) was established, designed to become the national oil company. In 1964 University of Petroleum and Minerals was established, with the aim of producing Saudis with the skills to manage this company in the future. Following OPEC negotiations in 1972, the Saudi government bought 25% ownership of Aramco. From 1974, Saudi participation increased to 60% and in 1976 total Saudi ownership was agreed, with payments completed in 1980.

As oil minister of Saudi Arabia, Yamani took an important role in the development of the newly created OPEC. Faced with the 1967 Arab-Israeli War, Yamani spoke against the use of an Arab oil embargo. The 1967 embargo was ineffective, although the experience led to a consideration of the possible political benefits of an Arab-only oil organisation. Yamani took the lead role in the development of this idea and in 1968 the Organization of Arab Petroleum Exporting Countries (OAPEC) was joined by Saudi Arabia, Kuwait, and Libya. Several other countries joined in 1970 and Egypt, Syria, and Iraq joined in the early 1970s.

=== 1973 oil crisis ===
During the Yom Kippur War, Yamani took the initiative and planned to drop oil production initially by 10 percent alongside other OPEC members, followed by 5 percent reductions each month. On 16 October, the six Persian Gulf members of OPEC met in Kuwait and took the decision to raise oil prices from US$3 to $5.12. This was the first time the producer countries had independently set the price of their oil. On the next day, the ten OAPEC members agreed to Yamani's moderate production cutback proposals. An embargo to countries seen as "hostile" was also recommended but not enforced, although by 22 October all OAPEC countries had placed an embargo on the United States, the Netherlands, and Denmark.

The production cutbacks, increased to 25 percent in November, affected the economic health of all Western powers. To gain political support, Yamani travelled through Europe, the United States, and Japan with Algerian oil minister Belaid Abdesselam. Both Yamani and OPEC became well known in the West, with Yamani described as "the man of the moment" in Newsweek International's 24 December 1973 cover article. Attempts by the United States at bringing together a consumer's cartel failed, and the EEC and Japan called on Israel to withdraw from Arab territories occupied in 1967.

On 22 December, the Persian Gulf members of OPEC met again in Tehran where the Shah, backed by the other states, urged that the price of oil be raised to over $20 a barrel. Yamani opposed this extreme increase, but could not contact Saudi Arabia from Tehran. Fearing a split in OPEC, Yamani decided on a compromise that put oil at $11.65, four times the price of a barrel prior to 16 October. Following progress with Arab-Israeli disengagement agreements, a decision was taken to end the embargo, which was formally lifted on 17 March 1974.

Saudi Arabia continued to push for price reductions from the $11.65 level, opposed by other OPEC members. This increasingly came to be seen as a pro-American stance by the other producers, although defended by Yamani as a safer option for the world economy. Saudi Arabia has been criticised for using its dominant position to force its own interests and its long-term production strategy, as a lower price enables the country to keep a high market share and discourages development of alternative energy sources that would curtail the worldwide demand for oil. To this point, Yamani famously said in 1973: "The Stone Age didn't end because we ran out of stones." (However, the quote may have been wrongly attributed by this and other sources.)

=== Assassination of King Faisal ===
On 25 March 1975, King Faisal was shot dead by his nephew Faisal bin Musaid. The young prince had joined a Kuwaiti delegation, led by oil minister Abdul Mutaleb Kazimi, which Yamani had escorted to the King's office. Yamani was standing next to the King when the shots were fired and, after interrogation, it was discovered that Faisal bin Musaid also believed Yamani to have been shot dead in the attack. Yamani continued in his role as oil minister for another eleven years after the death of Faisal.

=== 1975 hostage siege ===
On 21 December 1975, Saudi Arabia's Yamani, Iran's Jamshid Amuzegar, and the other OPEC oil ministers were taken hostage at their semi-annual conference in Vienna, Austria. The attack, which killed three non-ministers, was carried out by a six-person team led by Venezuelan terrorist Carlos the Jackal, which included Gabriele Kröcher-Tiedemann, and Hans-Joachim Klein. The self-named "Arm of the Arab Revolution" group called for the liberation of Palestine. Carlos planned to take over the conference by force and hold for ransom all eleven attending oil ministers, except for Yamani and Amuzegar who were to be executed.

Carlos arranged bus and plane travel for his team and 42 of the original 63 hostages, with stops in Algiers and Tripoli, planning to fly eventually to Baghdad, where Yamani and Amuzegar were to be killed. All 30 non-Arab hostages were released in Algiers, excluding Amuzegar. Additional hostages were released at another stop in Tripoli before returning to Algiers. With only 10 hostages remaining, Carlos held a phone conversation with Algerian President Houari Boumédienne, who informed Carlos that the oil ministers' deaths would result in an attack on the plane. Boumédienne must also have offered Carlos asylum at this time and possibly financial compensation for failing to complete his assignment. Carlos expressed his regret at not being able to murder Yamani and Amuzegar, then he and his comrades left the plane. All the hostages and terrorists walked away from the situation, two days after it began.

Some time after the attack, Carlos's accomplices revealed that the operation was commanded by Wadie Haddad, a founder of the Popular Front for the Liberation of Palestine. They also claimed that the idea and funding came from an Arab president, widely thought to be Libya's Muammar al-Gaddafi. Fellow militants Bassam Abu Sharif and Klein claimed that Carlos received and kept a ransom between US$20 million and US$50 million from "an Arab president". Carlos claimed that Saudi Arabia paid ransom on behalf of Iran, but that the money was "diverted en route and lost by the Revolution".

=== Continuation of Saudi oil policy ===
At an OPEC meeting in September 1975 in Vienna, Saudi Arabia continued to oppose sharp increases in the price of oil. Yamani was required to gain approval from Crown Prince Fahd for any increase to be agreed in excess of 5%. Unable to contact Saudi Arabia from Vienna, Yamani left the meeting and flew to London on his private jet in order to find a secure telephone. This incident was widely publicized.

At an OPEC meeting in May 1976 in Bali, Iran and seven other members advocated a 20% increase in oil prices to match inflation, although Saudi Arabia favoured a six-month price freeze. The Iraqi oil minister fiercely criticised Yamani and Saudi Arabia for pro-Western policy, which led to Yamani leaving the meeting and demanding an apology. This was settled and the six-month price freeze was agreed.

Six months later, OPEC assembled in Doha and Saudi Arabia again faced pressure to raise prices. Saudi Arabia and the UAE were the only two member countries not to agree to a 10% increase in January 1977 followed by an additional 5% increase in July. This led to a period of two-tier pricing with Saudi Arabia and the UAE charging $12.09 per barrel and the other OPEC countries $12.70 per barrel. In July 1977, an OPEC meeting in Stockholm ended two-tier pricing, with prices re-unified at $12.70.

In 1979, the Iranian Revolution resulted in the 1979 energy crisis. Saudi Arabia and other OPEC members managed to increase production sufficiently to replace that lost from Iran, but this did not prevent panic buying of oil. OPEC also maintained an official price, although the spot market led to oil prices being negotiated upward. Yamani claimed that Saudi Arabia would not sell over the OPEC price, but would remain committed to the reduction of oil prices.

=== Removal from office ===
The panic buying during the 1979 energy crisis led to increased oil stocks which began to flood the market and resulted in price wars between oil-producing nations competing for market share. This in turn led to reduced income for Saudi Arabia. On 13 June 1982, in the course of this downturn, King Khalid died of a heart attack and Crown Prince Fahd became King and Prime Minister.

The beginning of Fahd's rule was marred by the reduced oil income caused by the 1980s oil glut. The restricted national budget also encouraged the use of oil in barter deals. In 1984, Saudi Arabia purchased ten Boeing 747s to join the fleet of Saudia Airlines, paid for using 34.5 million barrels (5,490,000 m^{3}) of oil.

At an OPEC meeting in October 1986, Fahd sent his oil minister a cable demanding Saudi Arabia's oil quota to be increased and the price of oil set at $18, which Yamani refused to sign. On 29 October 1986, a brief announcement was made on Saudi television that Yamani had been dismissed. He was replaced by Hisham Nazer.

=== Other activities ===
In July 1982, Yamani founded Investcorp, a private equity firm, with several other oil ministers and well-known financiers. The firm's initial investments included Tiffany & Co., Breguet, a Swiss watch maker, and Chaumet, a French jeweller. Yamani, himself known to be a watch lover, also became majority shareholder of Vacheron Constantin in 1987. In 1996, Yamani's shares were then sold to Vendôme Luxury Group, owned by Richemont. In 1988, Yamani established the Al-Furqan Islamic Heritage Foundation under the Yamani Cultural and Charitable Foundation, which endeavours to preserve and publish historically important Islamic works. In 1990, Yamani founded the Centre for Global Energy Studies, a London-based market analysis group claiming to provide objective information on energy issues. Board members have included Edward Heath, Valéry Giscard d'Estaing, and Denis Healey, all of whom were friends of Yamani.

== Personal life ==
Yamani married his first wife Laila Sulaiman Faidhi, an Iraqi, in 1955. Together they had three children. Yamani's first daughter, Mai Yamani, was born in 1956, followed by second daughter Maha in 1959, and first son Hani in 1961. Mai studied anthropology and is now an author and scholar, and a former Research Fellow at the Royal Institute for International Affairs. Maha received a law degree from Cambridge, and Hani a degree in business administration.

Yamani married his second wife Tamam al Anbar on 23 March 1975, and had five children: Faisal (born 1976), Sharaf (born 1977), Sarah (born 1979), Arwa (born 1981), and Ahmed (born 1983).

Yamani was fluent in Arabic, English, and French. His negotiation style, as remarked on by Henry Kissinger, was to wine and dine other dignitaries until the point of fullness and lethargy, before beginning protracted negotiations (Reader's Digest, circa 1970).

Yamani died of heart failure on 22 February 2021 in London, aged 90, to be later buried in his hometown, Mecca.

== See also ==
- The Prize: The Epic Quest for Oil, Money, and Power
