= Golden gimmick =

1950 US-Saudi tax credit deal

The Golden Gimmick refers to a foreign tax credit deal enacted in November 1950 by the U.S. Government under President Harry Truman between King Ibn Saud of Saudi Arabia and the Arabian-American Oil Company (ARAMCO), a consortium comprising Standard Oil of California (Chevron), Standard Oil of New Jersey (Exxon), Standard Oil of New York (Mobil) and Texaco. King Ibn Saud was being influenced by Juan Pablo Pérez Alfonso of Venezuela who cut a similar 50/50 deal with New Jersey Standard Oil and Royal Dutch Shell. This 50/50 deal accorded the American oil companies a tax break equivalent to 50% of their profits on oil sales, with the other 50% to be diverted to King Ibn Saud via the US Treasury. The King agreed to this 50/50 splitting of Aramco's oil profits instead of nationalizing Aramco's oil facilities on Saudi soil. Venezuela eventually led the effort in forming OPEC and Saudi Arabia gained full control of Aramco by 1980.

== See also ==
- Corporate welfare
- Saudi Aramco
