= Mai Yamani =

Saudi Arabian anthropologist (born 1956)

- Born: 6 September 1956 (age 70); Cairo, Egypt
- Occupations: Anthropologist, scholar, author

Academic background
- Education: Bryn Mawr College; Somerville College, Oxford

Mai Yamani (Arabic: مي يماني; born 6 September 1956) is an independent Saudi scholar, author and anthropologist.

== Early life ==
Yamani was born in Cairo, Egypt, in 1956 to an Iraqi mother from Mosul and a Saudi Arabian father from Mecca, the former Saudi Minister Ahmed Zaki Yamani. Her paternal grandfathers came from Yemen, hence the surname Yamani ("from Yemen"). Her early education included schooling in Baghdad, Iraq and Mecca, Saudi Arabia.

She attended secondary school at the renowned Château Mont-Choisi in Lausanne, Switzerland, from 1967 to 1975. She received her bachelor's degree summa cum laude (with highest honors) from Bryn Mawr College in Pennsylvania; and subsequently attended Somerville College, University of Oxford, where she was the first Saudi woman to obtain a M.St. and a D.Phil. from Oxford, in social anthropology.

== Career ==
She started her career as a university lecturer at King Abdulaziz University in Jeddah, Saudi Arabia, between 1981 and 1984. She was a research fellow at University of Oxford between 1990 and 1991, an academic advisor for Georgetown University between 1990 and 2000, and a research fellow at the School of Oriental and African Studies (SOAS), University of London.

She has been a scholar at leading international think tanks in the U.S., Europe, and the Middle East. She has been a research fellow at the Royal Institute for International Affairs in London (1997–2007); a policy fellow at the Brookings Institution in Washington, DC (2007–2008); and a visiting scholar at Carnegie Middle East Center in Beirut (2008–2009).

Yamani has also been a visiting senior fellow at the Middle East Centre, London School of Economics and Political Science, between 2015 and 2017, and visiting professor at Mosul University between 2017 and 2020.

She speaks fluent Arabic, English, French, Spanish and Italian, and has a working knowledge of Persian, Hebrew and Maltese.

== Books ==
- Feminism and Islam: Legal and Literary Perspectives. NYU Press. September 1996. ISBN 978-0814796801.
- Changed Identities: The Challenge of the New Generation in Saudi Arabia. Royal Institute of International Affairs. 2000. ISBN 978-1-86203-088-6.
- The Rule of Law in the Middle East and the Islamic World: Human Rights and the Judicial Process. Bloomsbury Academic. 8 June 2000. ISBN 978-1860645624.
- Cradle of Islam: The Hijaz and a Quest for Arabian Identity. I.B.Tauris. 21 August 2009. ISBN 978-0-85773-110-4.
