= EXPEC Advanced Research Center =

Saudi oil and gas research center

Coordinates: 26°18′44.20″N 50°7′41.05″E

The Exploration and Petroleum Engineering Center - Advanced Research Center (EXPEC ARC) is located in Dhahran, Saudi Arabia. It is a research center that belongs to Saudi Aramco and is responsible for upstream oil and gas technology development. The center has over 250 scientists from various disciplines, spread across six technology teams and one laboratory division which tackle various aspects of oil and gas exploration, development, and production. These teams are: Geophysics Technology, Geology Technology, Reservoir Engineering Technology, Computational Modeling Technology, Production Technology, and Drilling Technology.
