= Amin H. Nasser =

Saudi corporate executive

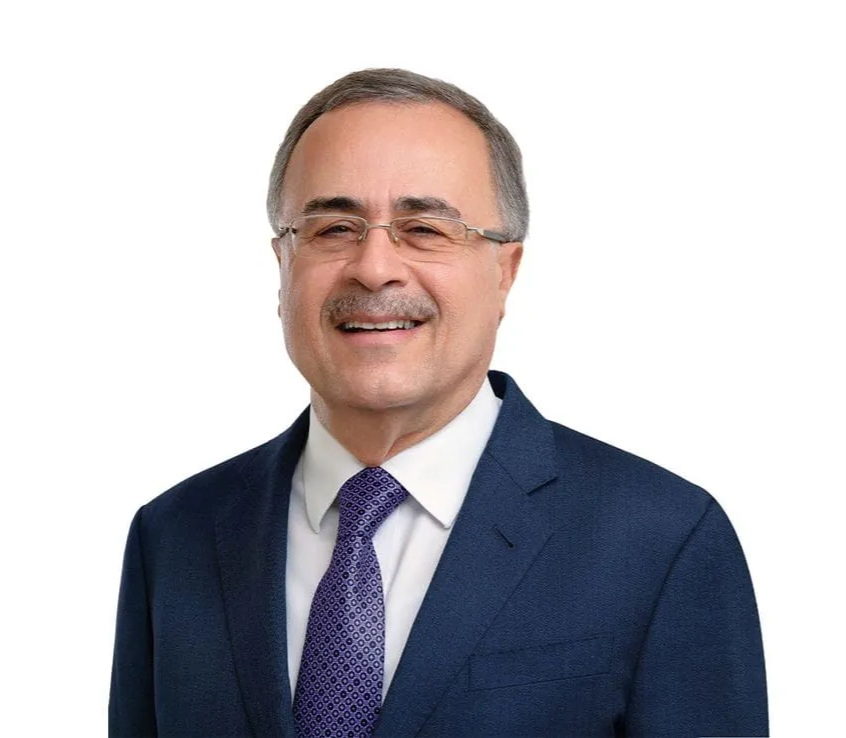
- Amin H. Nasser, President & CEO of Aramco
- Education: King Fahd University of Petroleum and Minerals
- Occupation: Petroleum engineer
- Title: President and chief executive officer of Saudi Aramco
- Term: September 2015 -
- Predecessor: Khalid A. Al-Falih
- Board member of: BlackRock
- Website: https://www.aramco.com/en

Amin Hassan Nasser (Arabic: أمين حسن الناصر) is a Saudi businessman who is the President and CEO of Saudi Aramco, the world's largest oil producer. He became acting president and chief executive in May 2015 before assuming the position permanently in September 2015. During his tenure at Aramco, he has criticized fossil fuel divestment and promoted expansion and investment into oil production.

== Education ==
Nasser holds a bachelor's degree in petroleum engineering from the King Fahd University of Petroleum and Minerals in Dhahran. He completed the Saudi Aramco Management Development Seminar in Washington, D.C., in 1999; the Saudi Aramco Global Business Program in 2000; and the Senior Executive Program at Columbia University in 2002.

== Career ==
Nasser began his career with Saudi Aramco in 1982 as an engineer in the oil production department and proceeded to work in drilling and reservoir management. In 1997, he became manager of the Ras Tanura Producing Department. Later he became manager of the Northern Area Production Engineering Department, as well as the Safaniya Offshore and Onshore Producing Departments. He was appointed Chief Petroleum Engineer in 2004. He was assigned as the company's vice president for petroleum engineering and development in 2007. He became Senior Vice President of Saudi Aramco's Upstream operations in 2008. Nasser became acting President and CEO of Aramco in May 2015, and was made permanent in September 2015.

As CEO, he led the company's response to drone and missile attacks on its facilities in September 2019.

Prior to Aramco's initial public offering (IPO), he led the company's entry into the global debt and capital markets with its first bond issuance. He oversaw Aramco's 2019 IPO in which it became the world's most valuable listed company, and led its 2020 acquisition of Saudi petrochemicals giant SABIC.

In 2021, amid growing pressure for fossil fuel companies to become greener to contribute to climate change mitigation, Nasser warned countries against divesting in fossil fuels, arguing that it would cause inflation and unrest.

== Other ==
Nasser is on the Society of Petroleum Engineers's Industry Advisory Council, the International Advisory Board (IAB) of the KFUPM, the Board of Trustees of the King Abdullah University of Science and Technology (KAUST), the World Economic Forum's International Business Council, the JPMorgan International Advisory Council, the MIT President CEO Advisory Board and the Board of BlackRock.

In July 2020, he received the ICIS Kavaler Award, which recognizes outstanding achievement in petrochemicals.
