= Hisham Nazer =

Saudi politician (1932–2015)

Ambassador to Egypt
- In office 2005–2011
- Monarch: Abdullah
- Prime Minister: King Abdullah
- Succeeded by: Ahmed bin Abdulaziz Kattan

Minister of Petroleum and Mineral Resources
- In office 24 December 1986 – August 1995
- Monarch: Fahd
- Prime Minister: King Fahd
- Preceded by: Ahmed Zaki Yamani
- Succeeded by: Ali Naimi

Minister of Planning
- In office 1975–1991
- Monarchs: Khalid; Fahd
- Prime Minister: King Khalid; King Fahd
- Succeeded by: Abdul Wahab Abdul Salam Attar

Personal details
- Born: Hisham Mohieddin Nazer; 31 August 1932 Jeddah
- Died: 14 November 2015 (aged 83) United States
- Spouse: Almira Nazer
- Education: University of California, Los Angeles

Hisham Nazer (Arabic: هشام ناظر; 31 August 1932 – 14 November 2015) was the third oil minister of Saudi Arabia, after Abdullah Tariki and Zaki Yamani. Nazer was appointed oil minister on 24 December 1986. He was also the first Saudi chairman of the board of Aramco, which was later called Saudi Aramco. He was one of the significant people in developing the domestic policy of Saudi Arabia. He also served as Saudi ambassador to Egypt from 2005 to 2011.

== Early life and education ==
Nazer was born in Jeddah in 1932. He belonged to a leading family based in Jeddah. He attended primary and secondary schools in Jeddah. Then he graduated from the Victoria College in Alexandria, Egypt. He received a bachelor of arts degree in international relations in 1957 and a master of arts degree in political science, both from The University of California, Los Angeles. He completed his master study at the UCLA in 1962.

== Career ==
Nazer began his career at the ministry of petroleum. He was among "the promising young technocrats" under Abdullah Tariki, the first Saudi oil minister, who made him assistant director general of the petroleum and minerals directorate in 1958. Nazer was sent to Venezuela in 1960 to be informed about international oil matters. In addition, Nazer represented Saudi Arabia at OPEC's founding meetings in 1961. Then, he served as deputy of Oil Minister Ahmed Zaki Yamani until 1968.

On 1 February 1968 Nazer was appointed head of the central planning authority. He was made a member of the Supreme Council on Petroleum in March 1973 when it was established by King Faisal.

His first ministerial post was the minister of planning which he began to hold in 1975 after the central planning authority was reorganized as an independent ministry. Therefore, he actively dealt with the Saudi Arabia’s first five-year development plans and contributed to the formation of Saudi Arabia’s two major industrial cities, Jubail and Yanbu. In addition, Nazer guided the construction and management of these facilities. Then, he became the head of the royal commission for Jubail.

Nazer was appointed acting minister of petroleum and mineral resources by King Fahd on 30 October 1986 and replaced Zaki Yamani in the post. Nazer's appointment was considered to be a shift in Saudi Arabia's policy in oil prices and production. Nazer continued to hold the portfolio of planning minister. His term as oil minister lasted until August 1995 when he was replaced by Ali Naimi in the post.

Nazer was also appointed the board chairman of the Aramco, replacing John J. Kelberer, in April 1988. Nazer was the first Saudi board chairman of the company. Following his appointment, he began to rationalize the company's operations and to nationalize it due to its low profitability for Saudi Arabia. Because the company was an American-registered entity. Thus, the company was nationalized, leading to its transformation as a pure Saudi entity which was renamed the Saudi Arabian Oil Company or more commonly Saudi Aramco on 8 November 1988.

In 2005, Nazer was named as Saudi ambassador to Egypt by King Abdullah. He was relieved of his duties by King Abdullah in March 2011 due to a controversy about remarks exchanged between him and a frustrated Saudi woman stranded in the Cairo Airport during the Egyptian uprise in February 2011. Ahmed bin Abdulaziz Kattan replaced him as ambassador.

== Personal life and death ==
Nazer is known to be a poet and was a soccer fan. He was married to Amira Nazer who was a paediatrician working at a hospital in Riyadh. His son, Loay Nazer, was arrested in the 2017 crackdown and released in January 2018. Nazer's brother was a businessman and functioned as a business agent for foreign investors.

Nazer died on 14 November 2015 at the age of 83 in the United States.

=== Views and publications ===
In the 1970s when Nazer was the minister of planning he stated that the countries which had received financial aid from Saudi Arabia such as Tunisia and Egypt were much more developed than Saudi Arabia.

Nazer published a book titled Power of a Third Kind in 1998. His book, written in English and published by Praeger, is about the effects of the Western-dominated electronic age on the world.

=== Awards ===
Nazer was the recipient of a professional achievement award from his alma mater, the University of California, Los Angeles, in June 1989. He was awarded an honorary degree by American University in Cairo in 1991.
