= 1953 Aramco Saudi Arabia strike =

- Date: October 17, 1953—October 26, 1953
- Location: Dhahran, Saudi Arabia
- Goals: Improved living standards and pay, and a reduction in the company's foreign workforce
- Methods: Striking; Rioting

Parties
Native Saudi workers	The American Arabian Oil Company; The government of Saudi Arabia

The 1953 Aramco Saudi Arabia strike was a labour strike in Dhahran against the Arabian American Oil Company (the American-owned predecessor to the modern Saudi Aramco). The Aramco strike was the first major labour dispute to occur in the history of Saudi Arabia.

13,000 native Saudi workers walked out following a breakdown in negotiations with the government of Saudi Arabia and the arrest of nine worker representatives. In addition to freeing their leaders, the workers demanded a living allowance on top of their wages, a reduction in the company's foreign workforce and living conditions similar to those of American employees of Aramco.

== Background ==
The Arabian American Oil Co., later Saudi Aramco, was a US-owned oil company and the largest company in Saudi Arabia. US firms had invested $500 million in Saudi oil production, and Aramco was the fourth largest oil producer in the world at the time.

=== Saudi labour movement ===
Throughout the Middle East, countries were first introduced to radical ideas through their integration in commerce, migration and the intellectual exchange of the British Empire. The industrialization of Saudi Arabia and the proletarianization of the native Saudi people who relocated to work in Aramco oil fields lead to substantial social transformations for an otherwise traditionalist culture. In the lead up to the Aramco strike, police had been tasked with confiscating communist literature in Saudi Arabia.

The Eastern Province was a locus of the leftist and nationalist movement within Saudi Arabia. Employees of Aramco, operating in the Eastern Province, received a modern education in intellectual centers around the Middle East, including Bahrain, Baghdad, Beirut and Cairo. This education exposed workers to Arab nationalism and communism.

Aramco hired both foreign workers and native Saudi people from the Eastern Province to do semi-skilled work. Expatriate workers from countries with longer histories of radical activism brought their local traditions with them, which were synthesized in the establishment of the Saudi labour movement. Some of the primarily Lebanese and Palestinian teachers at Aramco schools had been involved in left-wing political parties in their home countries, often discussing radical ideas with students and distributing banned literature.

=== Organized labour in Aramco ===
While the Aramco strike was Saudi Arabia's first major labour dispute, the earliest recorded labour action at Aramco started on 11 June 1945 when hundreds of workers rioted at the oil refinery in Ras Tanura. Workers protested their lack of access to food and harassment by company guards.

On 12 July 1945, 137 Arab drillers in Dhahran went on strike. Their main grievance was that they received unequal pay compared to American and other foreign workers. 1,700 Italian workers at Aramco would subsequently join the strike. By 4 August 1945, all 9,000 Arabs employed in Dhahran, Ras Tanura and the outlying worksites were on strike. Aramco had to negotiate an end to the strike with the workers' committee.

Prior to 1953, the Saudi government had passed no laws concerning labour actions. It maintained that all strikes in Saudi Arabia would be illegal, and that the government was responsible for resolving all labour disputes.

=== Early negotiations ===
In August 1953, 9 workers, seven of whom were Saudi natives representing 15,000 native workers entered Aramco's office demanding justice for their colleagues. The nine workers were all educated, two of whom were educated in the United States. The company agreed to meet with the representatives, who presented the following demands:

- An allowance of $240 per month in addition to the minimum wage of $42
- Living conditions akin to Aramco's American employees
- Air conditioning in all Aramco workers' homes
- A substantial reduction in foreign workers at the company

ʾAbd al-ʾAziz al-Sunayd, the committee's leader, was born in Suq al-Shuyukh, Iraq to an Iraqi mother and a Saudi father. He was first educated in Iraq where he was introduced to communism, before later studying at the American University of Beirut, which was known as a leftist intellectual centre in the Arab world. Having first joined Aramco as a teacher's assistant, he founded the committee with a group of Palestinian communist Aramco workers.

As negotiations with Aramco progressed, the representatives advanced additional demands. The Crown Prince Saud appointed a negotiating committee that took over negotiations with the workers, who criticized them of being "backward." Ultimately, the workers' committee demanded union recognition for the Saudi Aramco workers. In retaliation, the government negotiators sent the nine worker representatives to a jail in Hofuf on 15 October 1954. Aramco stated that the arrest of the representatives followed their failure to cooperate with the government committee.

== Strike ==
In response to the jailing of the workers' representatives, 13,000 of Aramco's 15,000 workers in Dhahran walked out on 17 October 1953 demanding they be released. The strikers stated they would not return to work until the representatives were released from prison. During the strike, strikers rioted outside Saudi police stations, fought with foreign workers and stoned vehicles. The strike lasted 12 days.

Operations at Aramco continued during the strike with a reduced workforce. The remaining 2,000 native Saudi workers who decided not to participate in the strike continued work on the oil rigs. Additionally, Aramco employed 4,000 American and 6,000 other foreign workers who stayed on the job.

Workers held meetings in Saudi worker camps during the strike. Those from the Eastern Province brought news and updates from the strike to their villages.

While the Saudi government denied it enacted martial law in response to the strike, it did state that it "took precautions to preserve security in the area"

=== Outcome ===
The strike ended on 26 October 1953 when the government ordered the strikers to return to work. If they failed to comply with the order, they would be forced to return to their home villages, where they would earn only 7.5 cents per day in wages.

On 9 November 1953, Saudi king Ibn Saud died. The political fallout of the king's death forced Aramco to make some concessions to the workers. The Saudi government promised to establish a special royal commission that would investigate the strikers' demands, including pursuing a small wage increase and improved transportation for workers. They also sought to establish an improved mechanism for reporting workplace grievances.

The strike motivated the government of Saudi Arabia to start investigating labour laws.

The remaining leaders of the Aramco strike would go on to establish secular opposition parties in Saudi Arabia, underground or in exile. Some would go on to organize the 1956 Aramco Saudi Arabia strike three years later.
