= Ministry of Energy (Saudi Arabia) =

Government ministry of Saudi Arabia

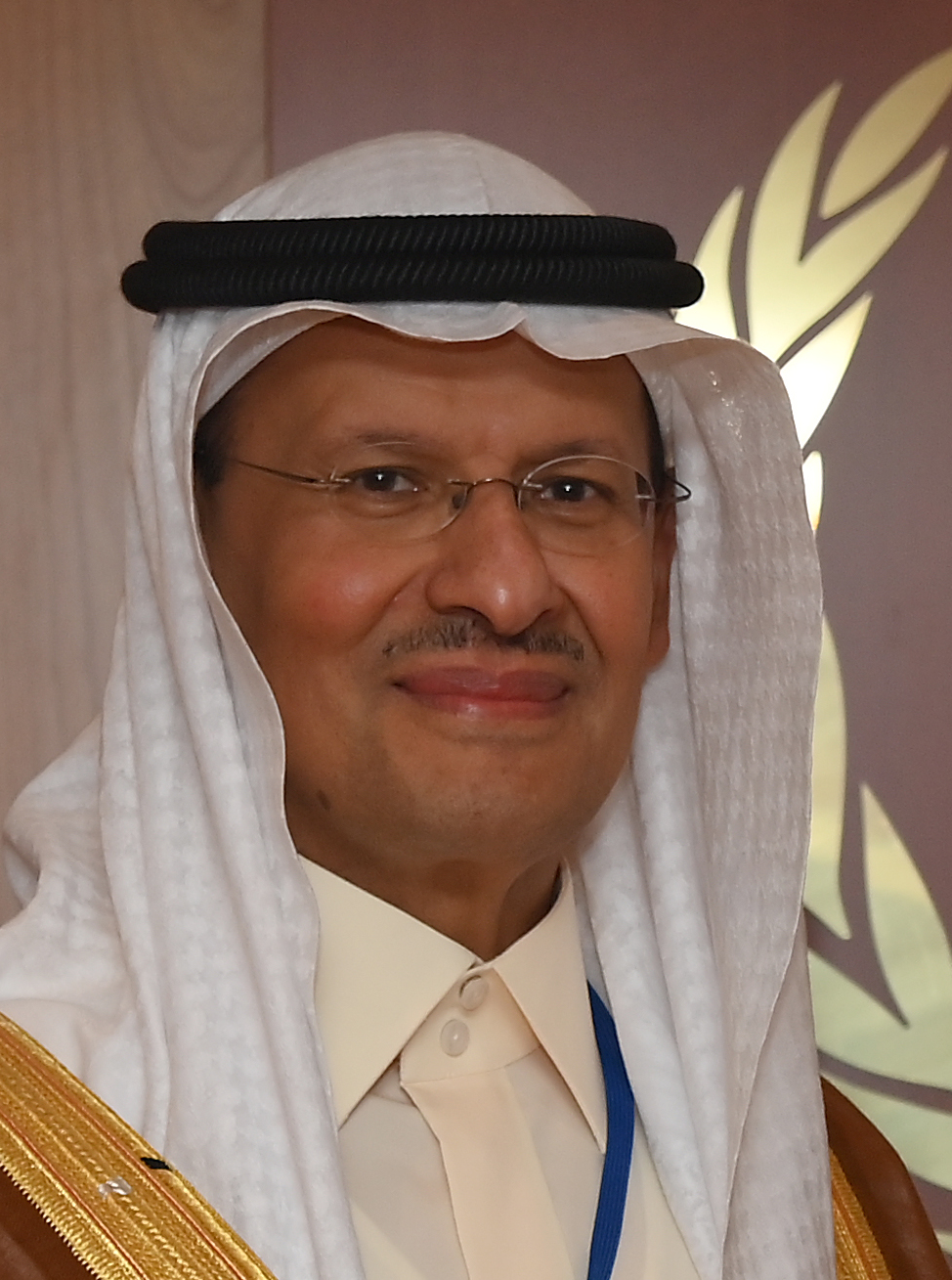
- Abdulaziz bin Salman Al Saud, the current Minister of Energy since 2019

Ministerial Department overview
- Formed: 1 December 1960; 65 years ago
- Preceding agencies: Directorate General of Petroleum and Mineral Affairs; Ministry of Petroleum and Mineral Resources
- Jurisdiction: Government of Saudi Arabia
- Headquarters: Riyadh, Saudi Arabia
- Minister responsible: Abdulaziz bin Salman, Minister
- Website: Official English website

The Ministry of Energy (Arabic: وزارة الطاقة) is a government ministry in Saudi Arabia and part of the cabinet. It is responsible for developing and implementing policies concerning petroleum and related products. The Ministry of Energy is working to diversify the national energy mix used in electricity production, increasing the share of natural gas and renewable energy sources to approximately 50% by 2030 while reducing the use of liquid fuel.

In August 2019, King Salman issued a royal decree and divided the Ministry of Petroleum and Mineral Resources into two: Ministry of Industry and Mineral Resources, and Ministry of Energy. While Khalid al-Falih still remained the energy minister, business executive Bandar Al-Khorayef was named as the minister of natural resources. However, on 8 September 2019, a royal decree was issued to appoint Abdulaziz bin Salman Al Saud as the energy minister. On 11 July 2026 he was appointed as Minister of Industry and Natural Resources in addition to his position as Minister of Energy.

== History ==
The ministry was established in December 1960. Prior to the formation of the ministry policies regarding oil production and planning were overseen by the directorate general of petroleum and mineral affairs which was attached to the ministry of finance. Then the directorate was converted into the ministry. The ministry was named the Ministry of Petroleum and Mineral Resources until May 2016 when it was renamed as the Ministry of Energy, Industry and Mineral Resources. In August 2019, the Ministry was separated into the Ministry of Energy and the Ministry of Industry and Mineral Resources.

=== List of ministers ===
Since 1960 the ministry was headed by the following six ministers:

1. Abdullah Tariki (December 1960 – 9 March 1962)
2. Ahmed Zaki Yamani (9 March 1962 – 5 October 1986)
3. Hisham Nazer (24 December 1986 – 2 August 1995)
4. Ali Naimi (2 August 1995 – 7 May 2016)
5. Khalid A. Al-Falih (7 May 2016 – 8 September 2019)
6. Abdulaziz bin Salman Al Saud (8 September 2019 – present)

== Organization and activities ==
The ministry is primarily responsible for the policies concerning oil and gas in the country which is the world's largest holder of crude oil reserves. One of the agencies with which the ministry works is Petromin, the general petroleum and mineral organization. Through Saudi Arabian Basic Industries Company (SABIC), established in 1976, the ministry oversaw the operation of petrochemicals and other heavy industry projects.

In 2019, the Minister inaugurated the launching ceremony of the Saudi scientific vessel, called “Najil” in Jubail port, Eastern Province. The main aim of the vessel is to conduct marine-related researches in the Persian Gulf and the Red Sea.

In 2019, and on the sidelines of the Saudi crown prince’s visit to India, the Minister of Energy, Industry and Mineral Resources signed a MOU to partner with the International Solar Alliance (ISA) and projects in fertilizers, pharmaceuticals and medical supplies.

== See also ==
- Ministries of Saudi Arabia
- OPEC
- Saudi Aramco
