= Ali Al-Naimi =

Saudi Arabian politician (born 1935)

His Excellency Ali Al-Naimi
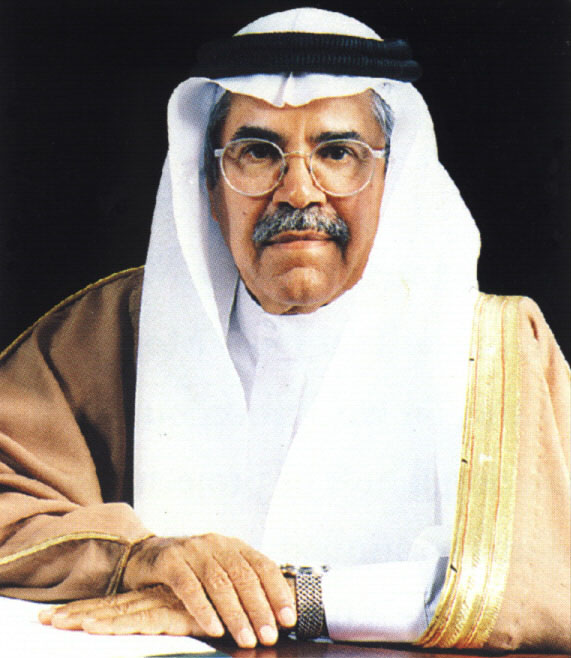

Minister of Petroleum and Mineral Resources
- In office 2 August 1995 – 7 May 2016
- Monarchs: King Fahd; King Abdullah; King Salman
- Preceded by: Hisham Nazer
- Succeeded by: Khalid A. Al-Falih

President and CEO, Saudi Aramco
- In office 1983–1995
- Preceded by: John Jacob Kelberer
- Succeeded by: Abdallah S. Jum'ah

Personal details
- Born: 2 August 1935 (age 91) Ar-Rakah, Saudi Arabia
- Spouse: Dhabyah
- Children: Reem, Rami, Nada, Mohammad
- Education: Lehigh University; Stanford University

Ali bin Ibrahim Al-Naimi (Arabic: علي بن إبراهيم النعيمي; born 2 August 1935) is a Saudi Arabian politician who was the Saudi Arabian Minister of Petroleum and Mineral Resources from 1995 to 2016.

== Early life and education ==
Naimi was born in Ar-Rakah in Saudi Arabia's Eastern Province. Born to Ibrahim, a pearl diver of the Al-Naimi tribe, and Fatima, a Bedouin of the Ajman, his parents became divorced during the pregnancy. As a consequence, Naimi was born into and lived the first eight years of his nomadic life with his mother's and stepfather's tribe. From the age of four, he tended the family's flock of lambs. His mother divorced his stepfather when Al-Naimi was eight, and Al-Naimi left the Ajmani tribe to live with his father in Al-Hasa.

Naimi's older brother Abdullah was hired by Aramco in 1944, and attended the Jebel School run by the company. Abdullah took Ali along to the school, where they learned English, Arabic, and basic arithmetic in the mornings, then worked as office boys in the afternoon. Finally, on 6 December 1947, Ali was hired as a junior clerk, but still attended school in the mornings.

Under the training programs of Aramco, he studied at International College, Beirut, and the American University of Beirut, before attending Lehigh University in Bethlehem, Pennsylvania, where he earned a Bachelor of Science degree in geology in 1962. He then earned a Master of Science degree in hydrology and economic geology at Stanford University.

Naimi also attended advanced management courses at Columbia University in 1974 and Harvard University in 1979.

== Career ==
After graduation, Naimi joined Aramco's exploration and production department as a geologist in 1964. He presented his first research paper, "The Groundwater of Northeastern Saudi Arabia", in 1965. In 1967, he spent a year in the public relations department, before being assigned as the senior supervising operator for the Abqaiq Field in 1968. There he used an innovative gas injection method to revive the Ain Dar, No. 17, well. On 1 April 1969, Ali was made superintendent, assistant manager in 1972, and then manager in 1973.

He was promoted to manager of Northern Area producing in 1974, which had responsibility for 11 of Aramco's 15 oil fields. On 1 May 1975, the Aramco board promoted Ali to be the vice president for producing and water injection. He was one of the leaders that initiated seawater injection as a replacement for well water. He was named president of Aramco Overseas Company before becoming a senior vice president in July 1978. Al Naimi was elected a member of board of directors in 1980 and was promoted to the newly created position of executive vice-president of oil and gas affairs in 1981. He was named president of Saudi Aramco in November 1983, being the first Saudi to hold that position. In 1988 Al-Naimi assumed responsibilities as CEO.

He became the minister of Petroleum and Mineral Resources on 2 August 1995 (his 60th birthday), replacing Hisham Nazer. Al-Naimi became the first oil executive to hold the office. He was succeeded by Abdullah S. Jum'ah as CEO of Aramco.

Also in 1995, Naimi received an honorary doctorate from Heriot-Watt University

In December 2010, the Saudi Supreme Petroleum Council, chaired by King Abdullah, asked Naimi to nominate candidates to succeed him as oil minister.

In November 2014, still serving as Saudi oil minister and therefore the de facto leader of OPEC, Naimi became the primary advocate for the export organization's controversial new strategy. He argued that the oil market should be left to rebalance itself at lower price levels, strategically rebuilding OPEC's long-term market share by ending the profitability of high-cost US shale oil production. In 2016 he announced that in the next years more investment will be made in renewable energy and solar technology, as he sees great potential in this area. Naimi completed his service as oil minister in May 2016, as deputy crown prince Mohammed bin Salman took on a stronger role in Saudi oil policy. Naimi was replaced by former executive at state-owned oil company Saudi Aramco Khaled Al-Falih.

In 2016 Naimi published his memoirs with the title Out of the Desert. The book gives insight into the domestic infighting and the future of Saudi Aramco.

=== Other positions ===
Naimi is chairman of the board of the King Abdullah University of Science and Technology (KAUST).

=== Recognition ===
King Salman named Al-Naimi adviser to the Royal Court. Ali received an honorary degree from Seoul National University and there is an A. I. Naimi Road at S-Oil's Onsan refining complex. His autobiography was published in November 2016.
