= Khalid A. Al-Falih =

Saudi businessman and manager

His Excellency Khalid A. Al-Falih
- خالد الفالح
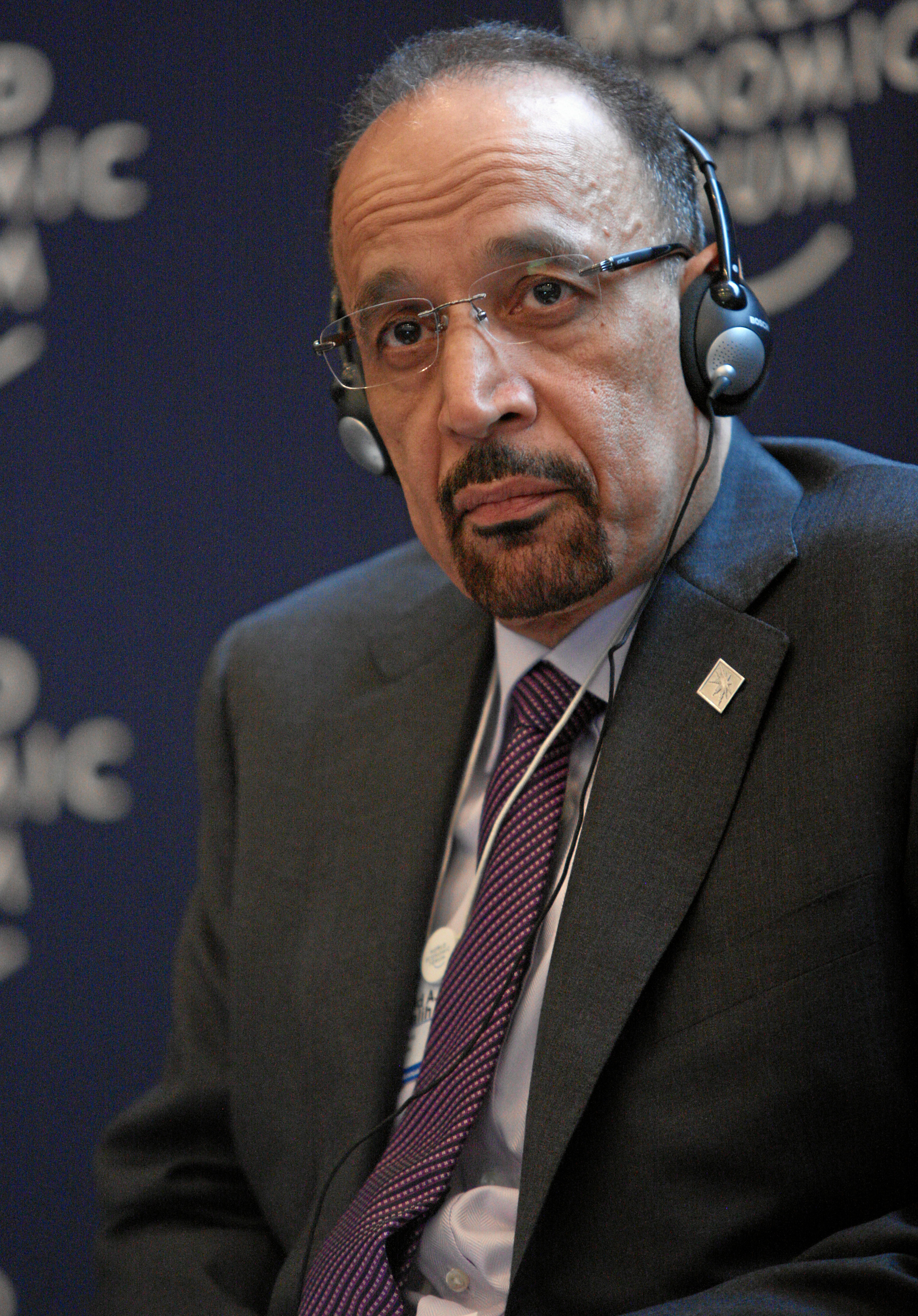
- Al-Falih in 2012

Minister of Investment
- In office 25 February 2020 – 12 February 2026
- Monarch: Salman
- Prime Minister: Salman (2020–2022); Mohammed bin Salman (2022–present)
- Preceded by: Ibrahim Al-Omar
- Succeeded by: Fahd bin Abduljalil Al-Saif

Minister of Energy, Industry and Mineral Resources
- In office 7 May 2016 – 8 September 2019
- Monarch: Salman
- Preceded by: Ali Al-Naimi
- Succeeded by: Abdulaziz bin Salman

Chairman of the board of Saudi Aramco
- In office 29 April 2015 – 2 September 2019
- Preceded by: Ali Al-Naimi
- Succeeded by: Yasir Al-Rumayyan

Minister of Health
- In office 29 April 2015 – 7 May 2016
- Monarch: Salman
- Preceded by: Ahmed Khatib
- Succeeded by: Tawfiq Al Rabiah

President and Chief Executive Officer of Saudi Aramco
- In office 1 January 2009 – 28 April 2015
- Preceded by: Abdullah S. Jum'ah
- Succeeded by: Amin H. Al-Nasser

Personal details
- Born: 1960 (age 65–66) Dhahran, Saudi Arabia
- Education: Texas A&M University; King Fahd University of Petroleum and Minerals

Khalid bin Abdulaziz Al-Falih (Arabic: خالد الفالح Khālid al-Fāliḥ; born 1960) is a minister of state and member of Council of Ministers of Saudi Arabia, and he served as Minister of Investment of Saudi Arabia from 25 February 2020 to 12 February 2026. He served as Minister of Energy of Saudi Arabia and chairman of Saudi Aramco. He also has previously served as the Saudi Arabian Health Minister and Aramco's CEO.

== Early life and education ==
Al-Falih was born in 1960 in Dhahran, Saudi Arabia, where he was also raised. He attended Texas A&M University, graduating in 1982 with a bachelor's degree in mechanical engineering, and later pursued an MBA at the King Fahd University of Petroleum and Minerals, which he completed in 1991.

== Early years at Aramco: 1979–2008 ==
Al-Falih joined Saudi Aramco (formerly, Aramco) in 1979. For over several years, he held positions of increasing responsibility and in 1992, he joined the Consulting Services Department (CSD). He supervised several technical units, mainly the Mechanical and Civil Systems Division and was named manager of CSD in January 1995. He was assigned as manager, Ras Tanura Refinery Maintenance Department in late 1995; and by 1998; manager, Business Analysis Department.

In July 1999, Al-Falih became president of Petron Corporation, a joint venture between Saudi Aramco and the Philippine National Oil Company. He returned to the Kingdom in September 2000 to serve as vice chairman on the Saudi Aramco Study Team for Upstream Gas Ventures, until his appointment as vice president of Gas Ventures Development and Coordination in May 2001. He played an instrumental role in the negotiations with the international oil companies (IOCs) & other major national oil companies (NOCs) in connection with the Kingdom's Natural Gas Initiative. Ultimately, four joint ventures, namely – South Rub' al-Khali Company (SRAK), Luksar Energy, Sino Saudi Gas & EniRepSa Gas were consummated between Saudi Aramco and various leading IOCs, NOCs and emerging oil companies.

In October 2004, Al-Falih was appointed to the board of directors of Saudi Aramco. He also served as chairman of the board of the South Rub' al-Khali joint venture between Shell, Total and Saudi Aramco.

== CEO of Saudi Aramco: 2009–2015 ==
In Nov 2008, Abdallah S. Jum'ah, then president and CEO of Saudi Aramco, retired and Khalid A. Al-Falih, who was serving as Aramco's executive vice president of operations, was appointed as the new president and CEO of the company, effective 1 January 2009.

As Saudi Aramco's CEO, Falih headed the Manifa project, an oil field located in a bay along the coast of the Persian Gulf. The project includes 27-man-made islands connected by 25 miles of causeways. Upon its launch, it produced 500,000 barrels of crude oil per day.

== Minister of Energy, Industry and Mineral Resources: 2016–2019 ==
The global oil economy caused prices to fluctuate dramatically, from a peak of almost $108 in June 2014 to $26 per barrel in February 2016, the lowest point since 2003. In May 2016, Al-Falih was appointed Minister of Energy, Industry and Mineral Resources, replacing outgoing Ali al-Naimi. The national plan Vision 2030 announced in April 2016 is designed to reduce the Kingdom's dependence on oil revenue, a new direction which affected the makeup of Saudi ministries. In the royal decree announcing the appointment of Al-Falih, the former Petroleum Ministry was renamed "Ministry of Energy, Industry and Mineral Resources," incorporating also the Ministry of Electricity. Al-Falih also holds the position of chairman of the board of directors of Aramco, whose CEO is Amin H. Nasser.

The oil crash caused OPEC countries to react by diminishing production, the organization's first cut in eight years. Minister Al-Falih urged fellow OPEC member countries to stop exceeding their output targets, and met with Venezuelan and Kazakh counterparts in August 2017 in order to extend the deal of cutting production until March 2018, by at least three more months.

On 8 September 2019, through a royal decree issued by King Salman, Al-Falih was relieved of his duties as the energy minister. He was replaced by Prince Abdulaziz bin Salman, the king's elder son, in the post.

== Minister of Investment: 2020–2026 ==
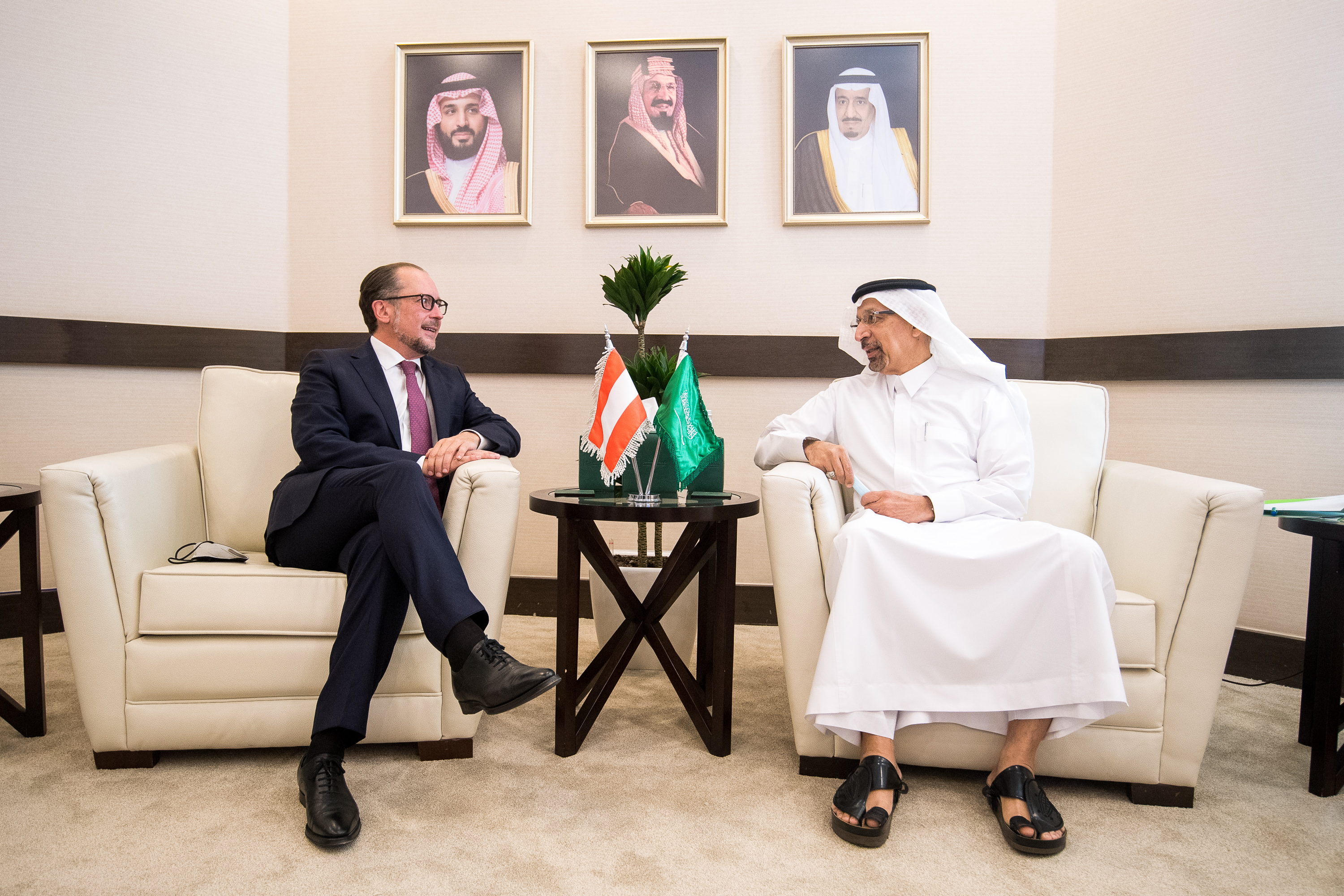
Al-Falih with Austria's Foreign Minister Alexander Schallenberg on 12 September 2021

On 25 February 2020, Al-Falih was appointed by a royal decree as Minister of Investment, a newly created ministry in Saudi Arabia.

In 2025, he announced $6.4 billion of investments in President Ahmed al-Sharaa's government as it seeks to rebuild Syria after a 14-year civil war. The investment deals included $2.93 billion for real estate and infrastructure projects and about $1.07 billion for the telecommunications and information technology sector, Al-Falih said.

On February 12, 2026, Al-Falih was relieved of his post as Minister of Investment by Royal Decree and was subsequently appointed as a Minister of State and a member of the Council of Ministers.

== Public life and board memberships ==
Al-Falih is active in many social programs. He has served as chairman of the Dammam City Municipal Council. His board memberships in other community-focused organizations include the Technical and Vocational Training Corporation, the Prince Sultan bin Abdulaziz Fund for Supporting Small Business Projects for Women, and the Eastern Province Society for the Handicapped.

Al-Falih is a founding member of King Abdullah University of Science and Technology and serves as a member of its board of trustees. He sits on the board of directors of the U.S.-Saudi Arabian Business Council and previously served as a member of the J.P. Morgan International Council.

== Personal life ==
Al-Falih currently resides in Dhahran. Al-Falih is married to Najah Al-Garawi.

== Achievements ==
Al-Falih was listed on the Forbes Most Powerful People for 2016. Forbes' annual ranking of The World's Most Powerful People identifies one person out of every 100 million whose actions mean the most.

Al-Falih received the Distinguished Alumnus Award in 2013 from Texas A & M University. Established in 1962, the Distinguished Alumnus Award is the highest honor bestowed upon a former student of Texas A&M University. Since its inception, 225 individuals have been recognized for their significant contributions to their professions, Texas A&M University and their local communities.

Al-Falih received the Petroleum Executive of the Year Award 2016 from Energy Intelligence. The Petroleum Executive of the Year award is the international energy industry's most prestigious award given in recognition of outstanding leadership by an executive in the international energy industry.

Al Falih was presented with the ‘International Oil Diplomacy Person of the Year 2017’ Award at the Energy Institute’s International Petroleum (IP) Week on Feb. 22 in London.

== Honors ==
- Grand Cordon of the Order of the Rising Sun: 2018
