= The Saudi Investment Bank =

Saudi joint stock company

- Native name: البنك السعودي للاستثمار
- Company type: Saudi Joint-stock Company
- ISIN: SA0007879063
- Industry: Banking; Financial services
- Founded: June 23, 1976; 49 years ago in Riyadh, Saudi Arabia
- Headquarters: Riyadh, Saudi Arabia
- Number of locations: 52 (2018)
- Area served: Regions of Saudi Arabia
- Products: Personal Banking, Treasury and Investment Group, and SME and Corporate Banking
- Services: Financing
- Net income: SAR 359.9 million (around US$96.0 million) ((end of March 2019))
- Total assets: 100,814,596,000 Saudi riyal (2019)
- Owners: Public Pension Agency, General Organization for Social Insurance, The Saudi Investment Bank
- Subsidiaries: Alistithmar For Financial Securities and Brokerage Company, The Saudi Investment Real Estate Company, The Saudi Investment First Company, SAIB Markets Limited Company
- Website: The Saudi Investment Bank

The Saudi Investment Bank (SAIB) (Arabic: البنك السعودي للاستثمار) was established as a Saudi joint stock, pursuant to Royal Decree No. M/31 of 25 Jumada II 1396H (corresponding to June 23, 1976) in Saudi Arabia. The bank started operations in March 1977.

The Saudi Investment Bank has a group of sister companies which are: Saudi Orix Leasing, and Amlak Global Finance and Real Estate Development. The bank operates through a 52 branch network as at the 2019, including 10 ladies branches distributed throughout Saudi Arabia. The Saudi Investment Bank engaged in the financing of quasi-governmental and industrial sectors and trade finance that includes import and export activities. Through its (Asala) program the bank provides Sharia-compliant banking products and services.

SAIB was ranked 26th on Forbes Middle East's 30 Most Valuable Banks 2025 list.

== See also ==
- List of banks in Saudi Arabia
