= Saudi Aramco =

Saudi Arabian state-owned petroleum and oil-trade company

Saudi Arabian Oil Company أرامكو السعودية

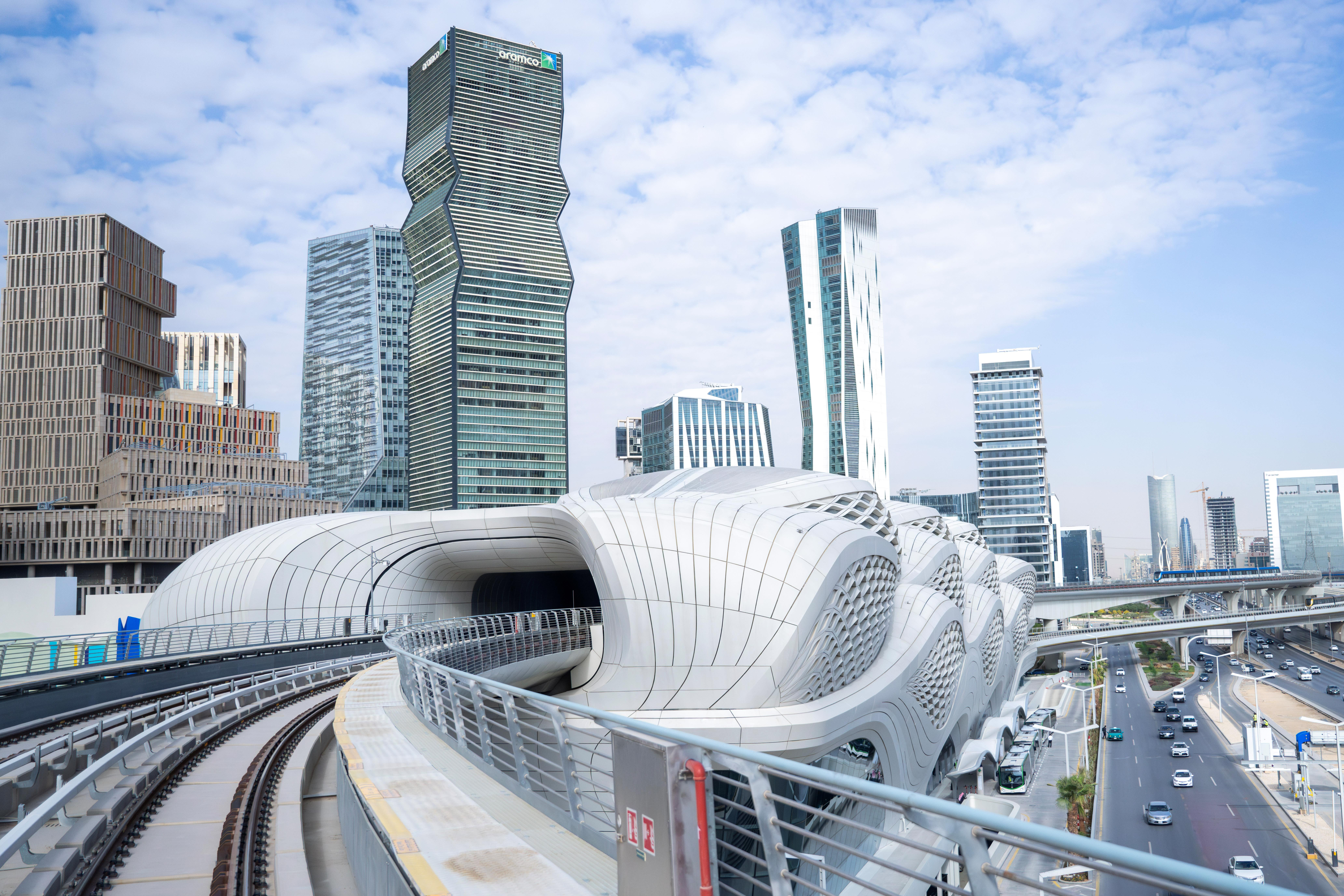
- Aramco Tower in the King Abdullah Financial District of Riyadh, Saudi Arabia
- Trade name: Saudi Aramco
- Native name: Saudi Arabian Oil Company
- Type: Public (mostly state-owned)
- Traded as: Tadawul: 2222
- ISIN: SA14TG012N13
- Industry: Oil and gas; Petrochemicals
- Founded: 29 May 1933; 93 years ago (as California-Arabian Standard Oil)
- Headquarters: Dhahran, Saudi Arabia
- Area served: Worldwide
- Key people: Amin H. Nasser (President & CEO); Yasir Al-Rumayyan (Chairman)
- Products: Crude oil; Natural gas; Refined petroleum products; Petrochemicals; Lubricants
- Services: Oil and gas exploration; Oil refining; Pipeline transport
- Revenue: ▼US$480.446 billion (2024)
- Operating income: ▼US$206.567 billion (2024)
- Net income: ▼US$106.246 billion (2024)
- Total assets: ▼US$646.301 billion (2024)
- Total equity: ▼US$440.361 billion (2024)
- Owner: Government of Saudi Arabia (82.19%); Public Investment Fund (12%); Sanabil (4%)
- Number of employees: +76,000+ (2026)
- Subsidiaries: SABIC (70%), Petro Rabigh, SATORP, Aramco Trading, Yanbu, Yasref, SASREF, S-Oil, Luberef, Aro Drilling, South Rub al-Khali, Pengerang Refining Company, The International Maritime Industries
- Website: aramco.com

Saudi Aramco (Arabic: أرامكو السعودية ʾArāmkū as-Suʿūdiyyah), officially the Saudi Arabian Oil Company, is a majority state-owned petroleum and natural gas company, and the national oil company of Saudi Arabia. As of 2024, it is the fourth-largest company in the world by revenue and is headquartered in Dhahran. Saudi Aramco has both the world's largest proven crude oil reserves, at more than 270 billion barrels (43 billion cubic metres), and largest daily oil production of all oil-producing companies.

Saudi Aramco operates the world's largest single hydrocarbon network, the Master Gas System. In 2024, its oil production total was 12.7 million barrels of oil equivalent per day, and it manages over one hundred oil and gas fields in Saudi Arabia, including 288.4 trillion standard cubic feet (scf) of natural gas reserves. Along the Eastern Province, Saudi Aramco most notably operates the Ghawar Field (the world's largest onshore oil field) and the Safaniya Field (the world's largest offshore oil field).

On 11 December 2019, the company's shares commenced trading on the Saudi Exchange. The shares rose to 35.2 Saudi riyals, giving it a market capitalisation of about US$1.88 trillion, and surpassed the US$2 trillion mark on the second day of trading. As of November 2025 the stock trades at 25.8 SAR, giving it a market capitalisation of approximately US$1.66 trillion. This represents an US$800bn fall in value since 2022, one of the largest decreases in corporate history.

In 2024, Saudi Aramco was responsible for more CO_{2} emissions than any other entity, taking into account Scope 3 emissions from use of the oil it sells; it was responsible for 1,653 Mt CO2 emissions, or 4.28% of global CO2 emissions.

In the 2020s, Saudi Aramco became heavily involved in sports being a FIFA and Formula One partner, including constructor Aston Martin.

== History ==
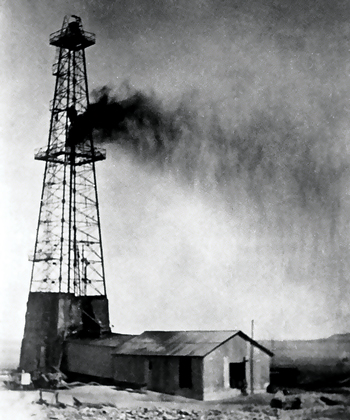
Dammam No. 7 struck oil in 1938, becoming the first commercial oil well in Saudi Arabia

Saudi Aramco's origins trace to the oil shortages of World War I and the exclusion of American companies from Mesopotamia by the United Kingdom and France under the San Remo Petroleum Agreement of 1920. The US administration had popular support for an "Open Door policy", which Herbert Hoover, secretary of commerce, initiated in 1921. Standard Oil of California (SoCal) was among those US companies seeking new sources of oil from abroad.

In 1932 the Bahrain Petroleum Company, a wholly owned SoCal subsidiary, discovered the first oil field in the Persian Gulf outside of Iran.

The Saudi Arabian government granted a concession to SoCal in preference to a rival bid from the Iraq Petroleum Company. The concession allowed SoCal to explore for oil in Saudi Arabia. SoCal assigned this concession to a wholly owned subsidiary, California-Arabian Standard Oil Company (CASOC). In 1936, with the company having had no success at locating oil, the Texas Company (Texaco) purchased a 50% stake of the concession. After four years of fruitless exploration, the first success came with the seventh drill site in Dhahran in 1938, a well referred to as Dammam No. 7. This well immediately produced over 1,500 barrels per day (240 m^{3}/d), giving the company confidence to continue. On 31 January 1944, the company name was changed from California-Arabian Standard Oil Co. to Arabian American Oil Co. (or Aramco). On 17 March 1947, Standard Oil of New Jersey (later known as Exxon) purchased 30% and Socony Vacuum (later Mobil) purchased 10% of the company, with SoCal and Texaco retaining 30% each. The newcomers were also shareholders in the Iraq Petroleum Co. and had to get the restrictions of the Red Line Agreement lifted in order to be free to enter into this arrangement.

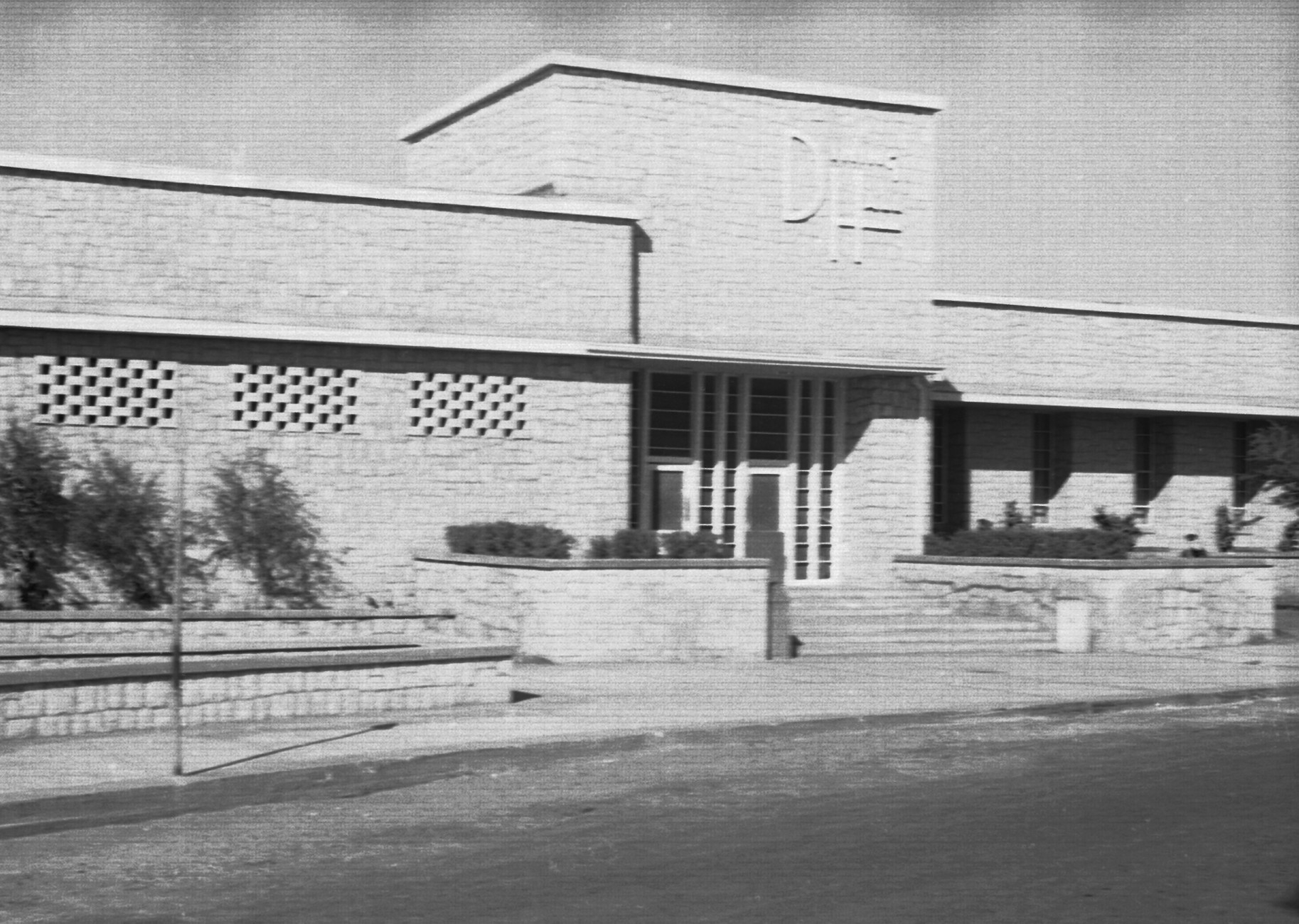
Aramco compound in Saudi Arabia, 1954

In 1949, Aramco had made incursions into the Emirate of Abu Dhabi, leading to a border dispute between Abu Dhabi and Saudi Arabia. In 1950, King Abdulaziz threatened to nationalise his country's oil facilities, thus pressuring Aramco to agree to share profits 50/50.

A similar process had taken place with American oil companies in Venezuela a few years earlier. The American government granted US Aramco member companies a tax break known as the golden gimmick equivalent to the profits given to King Abdulaziz. In the wake of the new arrangement, the company's headquarters were moved from New York to Dhahran. In 1951, the company discovered the Safaniya Oil Field, the world's largest offshore field. In 1957, the discovery of smaller connected oil fields confirmed the Ghawar Field as the world's largest onshore field. In 1953, Saudi Arabia's first ever major industrial strike was undertaken by 13,000 local Aramco workers. The strike ended after the Saudi government intervened, threatening those who continued to strike with being forcibly returned to their home villages where only low-income employment was available.

In 1975, the Saudi Arabia second five-year economic plan included a Master Gas Plan. Natural gas would be used to generate power, rather than flaring the gas. The plan counted on using the associated gas, but by 1985, Aramco was able to include a billion standard cubic foot per day (Bscfd) of non-associated gas. This non-associated gas was produced from the Khuff Formation, which is a limestone layer 650 metres (2,130 ft) below the oil-producing Arab Zone. In 1994, Aramco discovered more non-associated gas in the deeper Jawf sandstone formation and built plants in Hawiyah and Haradh to process it. This increased the capacity of the Master Gas System to 9.4 billion scfd.

=== Yom Kippur War ===
In 1973, following US support for Israel during the Yom Kippur War, the Saudi Arabian government acquired a one-quarter "participation interest" in Aramco's assets, then increased it to sixty percent in 1974. Aramco continued to operate and manage the former Aramco assets, including its concessionary interest in certain Saudi Arab oil fields, on behalf of the Saudi Arab Government until 1988. In November 1988, a royal decree created a new Saudi Arab company, the Saudi Arabian Oil Company, to take control of the former Aramco assets (or Saudi Aramco) and took the management and operations control of Saudi Arabia's oil and gas fields from Aramco and its partners. In 1989–90, high-quality oil and gas were discovered in three areas south of Riyadh.

=== Persian Gulf War ===
In September 1990, after the start of the Persian Gulf War, Aramco was expected to replace much of the oil production removed from the global market due to the embargo of Iraq and occupied Kuwait. This amounted to producing an extra 4.8 million barrels per day (Mbpd) to keep the global oil market stable. In addition, Aramco was expected to provide all of the coalition aviation and diesel needs. Aramco recommissioned 146 Harmaliyah, Khurais, and Ghawar oil wells with associated gas oil separation plants, and saltwater treatment pipeline, that had been mothballed during the 1980s oil price collapse. Daily production increased from 5.4 Mbpd in July to 8.5 Mbpd in December 1990 after a three-month de-mothball effort.

Starting in 1990, Aramco embarked on an expansion of crude oil sales in the Asian market. Agreements with South Korea, the Philippines, and China resulted. By 2016, about 70% of Aramco's crude oil sales were to Asia.

=== 2000s ===
In May 2001, Saudi Arabia announced the Gas Initiative, which proposed forming three joint ventures with eight IOCs for gas exploration on pure upstream acreage. Core Venture 1 included south Ghawar and north Rub' Al-Khali, Core Venture 2 included the Red Sea, while Core Venture 3 involved Shaybah and Kidan. In 2003, Royal Dutch Shell and TotalEnergies formed a partnership with Saudi Aramco in Core Venture 3. In 2004, Core Venture 1 became three separate joint ventures with Saudi Aramco holding 20%, one with Lukoil, a second with Sinopec, and a third with Repsol.

By 2004, Aramco was producing 8.6 million barrels per day (mbpd) out of a potential 10 mbpd. In 2005, Aramco launched a five-year plan to spend US$50 billion to increase their daily capacity to 12.5 mbpd by increasing production and refining capacity and doubling the number of drilling rigs. In 2005, Saudi Aramco was the world's largest company with an estimated market value of US$781 billion.

In June 2008, in response to crude oil prices exceeding US$130 a barrel, Aramco announced it would increase production to 9.7 million barrels per day (mbpd). Then as prices plummeted, Aramco stated in January 2009, that it would reduce production to 7.7 mbpd. In 2011, Saudi Aramco started production from the Karan Gas Field, with an output of more than 400 million scf per day. In January 2016, the Deputy Crown Prince of Saudi Arabia, Mohammad bin Salman Al Saud, announced he was considering listing shares of the state-owned company, and selling around 5% of them in order to build a large sovereign wealth fund.

In 2011, Saudi Aramco launched the Accelerated Transformation Program (ATP), a corporate strategy with the stated aim of becoming the world's leading integrated energy and chemicals company by 2020. It followed a strategic review that began in 2010. The program was first described in public in May 2011, as a move from an oil and gas company to a fully integrated global energy enterprise. It was tied to a "2020 Strategic Intent" that included "facilitating the sustainable and diversified expansion of the kingdom's economy". Aramco executives said the program used a governance model the company had not applied to earlier initiatives: 14 execution teams, each with its own charter, worked under a Strategy Council that set overall policy direction. A Strategic Transformation Office was responsible for the program's development.

On 26 April 2017, Saudi security forces thwarted an attempted attack on an Aramco oil distribution centre involving an unmanned boat from Yemen. The Wall Street Journal reported in September 2018, Aramco was considering a US$1 billion venture-capital fund to invest in international technology firms.

In June 2019, a report by Financial Times claimed that Aramco had been bearing the ministry-related expenses; boosting the finance ministry budget allocation. It also included Energy Minister Khalid Al Falih’s company-related and diplomatic trips, as well as his stays in luxurious hotels. However, an ally mentioned that Falih’s policies have delivered additional oil revenues that far exceeded his expenses. In September 2019, Saudi Arabia appointed Yasir Al-Rumayyan as the Chairman of Aramco. Al-Rumayyan became head of the country’s sovereign wealth fund by replacing Khalid Al-Falih, who was holding the position since 2015.

=== 2012 cyber attack ===
Aramco computers were attacked by a virus on 15 August 2012. The following day Aramco announced that none of the infected computers were part of the network directly tied to oil production and that the company would soon resume full operations. Hackers claimed responsibility for the spread of the computer virus. The virus hit companies within the oil and energy sectors. A group named "Cutting Sword of Justice" claimed responsibility for an attack on 30,000 Saudi Aramco workstations, causing the company to spend months restoring their services. The group later indicated that the Shamoon virus had been used in the attack. Due to this attack, the main site of Aramco went down and a message came to the home page apologising to customers. Computer security specialists said that "The attack, known as Shamoon, is said to have hit at least one organisation in the sector. Shamoon is capable of wiping files and rendering several computers on a network unusable." Richard Clarke suggests the attack was part of Iran's retaliation for the US involvement in Stuxnet. Security researcher Chris Kubecka, who helped the company establish security after the attack, detailed the level of sophistication in her Black Hat USA 2015 presentation and episode 30 of Darknet Diaries.

=== 2019 drone attack ===
On 14 September 2019, there was a drone attack on two Saudi Aramco plants: the Abqaiq oil processing facility and Khurais oil field. Houthi rebels claimed responsibility for the attack. The attack cut 5.7 million barrels per day (bpd) of Saudi crude output, over 5% of the world's supply. There were discussions by Saudi Arabian officials on postponing Aramco's IPO, because the attacks "sidelined more than half of the kingdom's output" of oil.

=== 2019 initial public offering (IPO) ===
Since around 2018, Saudi Arabia had been considering to put a portion of Saudi Aramco's ownership, up to 5%, onto public trading via a staged initial public offering (IPO), as to reduce the cost to the government of running the company. While the IPO had been vetted by major banks, the IPO was delayed over concerns of Aramco's corporate structure through 2018 into 2019. The September 2019 drone attacks on Aramco's facilities also delayed the onset of the IPO.

On 9 April 2019, Aramco issued bonds collectively valued at US$12 billion. Its first international bond issue received more than US$100 billion in orders from foreign investors, which breaks all records for a bond issue by an emerging market entity. Aramco announced on Sunday 3 November 2019 its plan to list 1.5% of its value as an IPO on the Tadawul stock exchange. On 9 November 2019, Saudi Aramco released a 600-page prospectus giving details of the IPO. According to the specifications provided, up to 0.5% of the shares were locked for individual retail investors.

On 4 December 2019, Saudi Aramco priced its offering at 32 Saudi riyals (approximately US$8.53 at the time) per share. The company generated subscriptions of total amount equals US$119 billion representing 456% of total offer shares. It raised US$25.6 billion in its IPO, making it the world's largest IPO, succeeding that of the Alibaba Group in 2014. The company commenced trading on Tadawul on 11 December 2019, with shares rising 10% to 35.2 riyals, giving the company a market capitalisation of about US$1.88 trillion, and making Saudi Aramco the world's largest listed company. The entire Tadawul has a market capitalisation of US$2.22 trillion.

=== Global Medium Term Note Programme ===
According to a bourse filing made by Aramco, the likes of Goldman Sachs, HSBC, Morgan Stanley, JPMorgan, and NCB Capital were hired by the company for organising investor calls prior to the planned transaction. The document published by one of the other banks said to be involved in the deal showed that the deal included BNP Paribas, MUFG, BofA Securities, SMBC Nikko, First Abu Dhabi Bank, Societe Generale, and BOC International. The company has reported a fall in the net profit of its third-quarter for November 2020, due to increased crude prices and a drop in its demand following the COVID-19 pandemic.

=== 2020s ===
On 10 March 2020 Saudi Aramco announced a global partnership with Formula One landing a multi-year deal. On 17 June 2020, Saudi Aramco acquired a 70% share in SABIC, a chemicals manufacturing company. In June 2020, Saudi Aramco laid off nearly 500 of its more than 70,000 employees, as global energy firms reduced their workforce due to the COVID-19 pandemic. Most of the workers who lost their job at Aramco were foreigners. On 31 July 2020, Saudi Aramco lost its title as the world's largest listed company by market capitalisation to Apple. On 9 August 2020, Saudi Aramco reported a 50% fall in net income for the first half of its financial year, as demand for oil and prices continued to fall due to the coronavirus crisis. On 3 November 2020, Saudi Aramco reported a 44.6% drop in third-quarter net profit amid the COVID-19 pandemic.

On 14 December 2020, Saudi state TV announced that an oil tanker carrying over 60,000 metric tons of unleaded gasoline from an Aramco refinery at Yanbu, had been attacked by a smaller boat rigged with explosives.

In March 2021, Saudi Aramco announced that earnings in 2020 fell by nearly 45% compared with 2019, as lockdowns around the world following the COVID-19 pandemic curbed demand for oil. On 19 March 2021, an Aramco refinery was attacked by six bomb-laden drones. The attack, which was claimed by Houthi rebels, started a fire but caused no injuries or damage, according to the official Saudi Press Agency. On 21 March 2021, Saudi Aramco signed an agreement to secure China's energy supplies for the next 50 years, and also to develop new technologies to combat climate change. More recently, they signed a deal with a consortium led by EIG. In July 2021, Saudi Aramco appointed former HSBC Holdings Plc Chief Executive Officer Stuart Gulliver to the company's board of directors.

In October 2021, Saudi Aramco announced plans to achieve net-zero carbon emissions from its wholly owned operations by 2060. On 20 November 2021, Houthi fighters took credit for launching 14 drones at military targets in Riyadh, Abha, Jizan, Najran, and Jeddah, and Aramco's refineries in Jeddah. In 2021, The Guardian reported that Aramco was not trying to diversify at the same rate as other oil companies, such as Shell and BP. Rather, Aramco announced in 2021 that the company intended to increase crude capacity from 12m barrels a day to 13m barrels by 2027.

Saudi Aramco partnered with F1 constructor Aston Martin on a deal including sponsorship and naming rights, for which Aston Martin is officially called Aston Martin Aramco Cognizant Formula One Team in early 2022; it would be renamed Aston Martin Aramco F1 Team from 2024 on. In February 2022, following crude's ascent to nearly $95 per barrel, Saudi Arabia's Aramco boosted oil prices for clients in Asia, the United States, and Europe. In March 2022, Houthi fighters attacked an Aramco storage site in Jeddah causing a fire in two storage tanks. The incident occurred during the closing part of the first practice session for the 2022 Saudi Arabian Grand Prix, with first reports coming just after 17:40 local time. After closed-door discussions between Formula One officials, all ten teams, and local officials, the remaining sessions went ahead as planned. On 11 May 2022, Saudi Aramco became the largest (most valuable) company in the world by market cap, surpassing Apple Inc. In August 2022, Saudi Aramco announced that it would acquire Valvoline's petroleum unit for $2.65 billion.

In March 2023, Saudi Aramco announced that they had seen record profits of $161 billion as prices of petrol soared following the COVID-19 pandemic. The figures eclipsed the numbers posted by ExxonMobil and Shell, who reported $55.7 and $39.9 billion in profit respectively. In March 2023, Saudi Aramco announced it was going to acquire a 10% stake in China's Rongsheng Petrochemical Co. Ltd, with an estimated purchase price of $3.6 billion, and plans to build a new refining and petrochemical complex in northeast China through a joint venture.

In September 2023, it was announced that Saudi Aramco had reached an agreement with the Latin American private equity fund, Southern Cross Group to acquire the Santiago-headquartered fuel retailer, Esmax Distribución SPA, operator of Petrobras-branded service stations in Chile. The acquisition marks Saudi Aramco's entry into the South American fuel retailing market, and beginning in May 2024, the 300 Petrobras service stations in Chile will be gradually converted to Aramco service stations. In September 2023, Indian engineering and construction giant Larsen & Toubro (L&T) signed a contract with Saudi Aramco. The Jafoor unconventional gas development expansion project in Saudi Arabia where L&T will build a gas processing plant and major processing facilities is worth $2.9 billion. In December 2023, Saudi Aramco acquired 40% shares in Gas & Oil Pakistan for an undisclosed amount. In January 2024, the Saudi government told Aramco to abandon its planned expansion to 13 million barrels a day by 2027 and to maintain maximum capacity at 12 million barrels per day. On 25 April 2024, Saudi Aramco announced that they had become FIFA's Major Worldwide Partner on three-year deal with sponsorship rights on the 2026 FIFA World Cup and the 2027 FIFA Women's World Cup.

In August 2025, Saudi Aramco sold a 49% stake in its Jafurah gas processing facilities to a BlackRock-led consortium for $11 billion. The lease and leaseback agreement allowed Aramco to raise capital while retaining a majority stake in the infrastructure subsidiary. Production at Jufurah and the Tanajib Gas Plant began in December 2025. Tanajib is intended to reach a raw-gas processing capacity of 2.6 billion standard cubic feet per day by 2026. In February 2026, Saudi Aramco began selling Jafurah condensate cargoes to U.S. energy companies Chevron and ExxonMobil. The sales marked the beginning of exports from the Jafurah gas project.

Saudi Aramco was ranked first on Forbes Middle East's Top 100 Listed Companies 2025 list. In early 2026, Saudi Aramco signed a 20-year deal to receive one million tonnes of liquefied natural gas per year from USA.

In March 2026, Aramco announced its first share-buyback program, which authorized repurchases of up to $3 billion over an 18-month period. On 19 March 2026, the SAMREF refinery located in Yanbu was targeted by an aerial attack causing minimal damages.

Along with other Middle East countries where oil reserves are easy to extract, Saudi Arabia has relatively low production costs around $10 per barrel, making most oil sales prices profitable. By comparison, Canada and United States have production costs around $40 to $60 per barrel.

On 5 October 2026, Aramco CEO Amin Nasser addressed the Energy Intelligence Forum in London, warning that pressure on both crude oil and refined fuels would likely intensify. Until the Strait of Hormuz fully reopens and confidence returns, he said, "pressure at both ends of the barrel will intensify," adding that replenishing global inventories could take up to two years. Nasser further noted that Saudi Arabia's maximum sustainable production capacity of 12 million barrels per day could be made available within days, and that Aramco was studying additional export routes beyond the existing East-West pipeline.

On 13 October 2026 the Aramco headquarters was attacked in Dhahran. The attack occurred during the October 2026 attacks on Saudi airports by Houthis. Sources told Reuters that the building was on fire and an evacuation order had been issued. It is not known if the damage resulted from an intercepted missile or a direct attack.

== Operation ==
Exploration

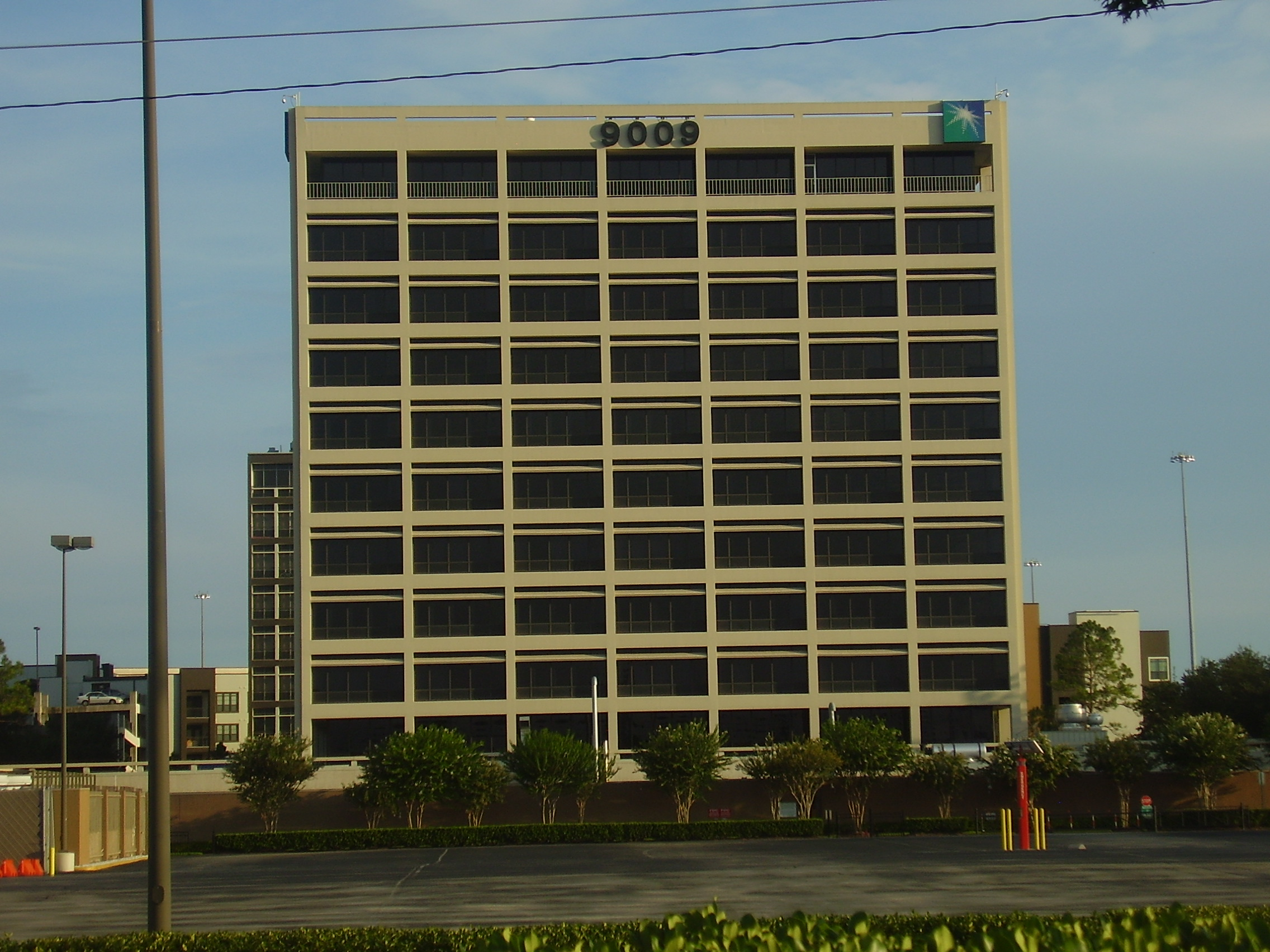
Headquarters of Aramco Services Co. in Houston

Saudi Aramco is headquartered in Dhahran, but its operations span the globe and include exploration, production, refining, chemicals, distribution and marketing. All these activities of the company are monitored by the Saudi Arabian Ministry of Petroleum and Mineral Resources together with the Supreme Council for Petroleum and Minerals. However, the ministry has much more responsibility in this regard than the council.

=== Finances ===
The key trends for Saudi Aramco are (as of the financial year ending 31 December):

	Revenue (USD million)	Income before tax (USD million)	Net Income (USD million)	Total Assets (USD million)
2017	264,176	155,050	75,898	294,014
2018	359,204	212,772	111,071	359,171
2019	329,809	177,798	88,185	289,581
2020	229,891	99,313	49,003	404,102
2021	400,468	205,206	109,972	576,718
2022	604,366	307,456	161,068	664,780
2023	495,033	236,818	121,271	660,784
2024	480,446	208,536	106,246	646,301
2025	445,654	187,429	93,389	680,524

=== Board of directors ===
HE Yasir O. Al-Rumayyan (Chairman) HE Dr. Ibrahim A. Al-Assaf (Deputy Chairman) HE Mohammed A. Al-Jadaan (Director) HE Faisal F. Alibrahim (Director) Mr. Khalid H. Al-Dabbagh (Director) Mr. Amin H. Nasser (Director) Mr. Robert W. Dudley (Director) Ms. Lynn Laverty Elsenhans (Director) Mr. Stuart T. Gulliver (Director) Mr. Andrew N. Liveris (Director) Mr. Mark A. Weinberger (Director)

=== Exploration ===
A significant portion of the Saudi Aramco workforce consists of geophysicists and geologists. Saudi Aramco has been exploring for oil and gas reservoirs since 1982. Most of this process takes place at the EXPEC Advanced Research Center. Originally, Saudi Aramco used Cray Supercomputers (CRAY-1M) in its EXPEC Advanced Research Center (ECC) to assist in processing the colossal quantity of data obtained during exploration and in 2001, ECC decided to use Linux clusters as a replacement for the decommissioned Cray systems. ECC installed a new supercomputing system in late 2009 with a disk storage capacity of 1,050 terabytes (i.e., exceeding one petabyte), the largest storage installation in Saudi Aramco's history to support its exploration in the frontier areas and the Red Sea.

=== Refining and chemicals ===
While the company did not originally plan on refining oil, the Saudi government wished to have only one company dealing with oil production. Therefore, on 1 July 1993, the government issued a royal decree merging Saudi Aramco with Samarec, the country's oil refining company. The following year, a Saudi Aramco subsidiary acquired a 40% equity interest in Petron Corporation, the largest crude oil refiner and marketer in the Philippines. Since then, Saudi Aramco has taken on the responsibility of refining oil and distributing it in the country. In 2008, Saudi Aramco sold its entire stake to the Ashmore Group, a London-listed investment group. Ashmore acquired an additional 11% when it made a required tender offer to other shareholders. By July 2008, Ashmore, through its SEA Refinery Holdings B.V., had a 50.57% of Petron's stock. Ashmore's payment was made in December 2008. In December 2008, Ashmore acquired PNOC's 40% stake. In the same month, San Miguel Corporation (SMC) said it was in the final stages of negotiations with the Ashmore Group to buy up to 50.1% of Petron. In 2010, SMC acquired majority control of Petron Corporation.

Currently, Saudi Aramco's refining capacity is 5.4 million barrels per day (860,000 m^{3}/d) (International joint and equity ventures: 2,500 Mbbl/d (400,000,000 m^{3}/d), domestic joint ventures: 1,900 mpbd, and wholly owned domestic operations: 1,000 Mbbl/d (160,000,000 m^{3}/d).)

Saudi Aramco's downstream operations are shifting emphasis to integrate refineries with petrochemical facilities. Their first venture into it is with Petro Rabigh, which is a joint venture with Sumitomo Chemical Co. that began in 2005 on the coast of the Red Sea. In order to become a global leader in chemicals, Aramco will acquire 50% of Royal Dutch Shell's stake in their refiner in Saudi Arabia for US$631 million. In October 2025, Aramco acquired an additional 22.5% stake in Petro Rabigh for $702 million from Sumitomo Chemical so that Aramco now holds a total of 60%.

==== List of refineries ====
List of domestic refineries:

Riyadh oil refinery, operated by Aramco is located at the outskirts of Riyadh

- Jazan Refinery and terminal projects (JRTP) (400,000 bbl/d (64,000 m^{3}/d)), Jazan construction is ongoing.
- Jeddah Refinery (78,000 bbl/d (12,400 m^{3}/d)) Jeddah converted to product storage terminal in November 2017.
- Ras Tanura Refinery (550,000 bbl/d (87,000 m^{3}/d)) (includes a Crude Distillation Unit, a Gas Condensate Unit, a hydrocracker, and catalytic reforming)
- The Saudi Aramco Jubail Refinery Co. (SASREF), Jubail (305,000 bbl/d (48,500 m^{3}/d))
- Riyadh Refinery (126,000 bbl/d (20,000 m^{3}/d))
- Yanbu Refinery (245,000 bbl/d (39,000 m^{3}/d))

List of domestic refining ventures:

- The Saudi Aramco Mobil Refinery Co. Ltd. (SAMREF), Yanbu (400,000 bbl/d (64,000 m^{3}/d))
- Petro Rabigh, Rabigh (400,000 bbl/d (64,000 m^{3}/d))
- Saudi Aramco Base Oil Co. (Luberef)
- Saudi Aramco Total Refining and Petrochemical Co. (SATORP), Jubail (400,000 bbl/d (64,000 m^{3}/d))
- Yanbu Aramco Sinopec Refinery (YASREF), Yanbu (400,000 bbl/d (64,000 m^{3}/d))

List of international refining ventures:

- Fujian Refining and Petrochemical Co. (FRPC), People's Republic of China
- Sinopec SenMei (Fujian) Petroleum Co. Ltd. (SSPC), People's Republic of China
- Motiva Enterprises LLC, United States, Port Arthur Texas 635,000 bbl/d (101,000 m^{3}/d)
- Showa Shell, Japan 445,000 bbl/d (70,700 m^{3}/d)
- S-Oil, Republic of Korea 669,000 bbl/d (106,400 m^{3}/d)
- Saudi Refining Inc., United States
- Reliance Industries, (no investment) India

Saudi Aramco at one point had been exploring projects in Pakistan, including a $10 billion refinery project in Gwandar which has since been cancelled. In 2022 it was revealed that Saudi Aramco was creating a joint venture with North Huajin Chemical Industries group to create a new company called Huajin Aramco Petrochemical Company which would develop a 300,000 bpd refining facility with ethylene steam cracking capabilities.

=== Shipping ===
Saudi Aramco has employed several tankers to ship crude oil, refined oil, and natural gas to various countries. It used to have its own created subsidiary company, Vela International Marine, which was merged with Bahri company, to handle shipping to North America, Europe, and Asia. It is a stakeholder in the King Salman Global Maritime Industries Complex, a shipyard that will be the largest in the world when complete.

=== Global investment ===
Saudi Aramco expanded its presence worldwide to include the three major global energy markets of Asia, Europe, and North America. In April 2019, Aramco has signed a deal to acquire a 13% stake in South Korean oil refiner Hyundai Oilbank for US$1.24 billion. Moreover, on 11 April 2019, Aramco signed an agreement with Poland’s leading oil refiner PKN Orlen to supply it with Arabian Crude Oil.

=== Liquefied natural gas ===
Aramco is planning to be a major producer of liquefied natural gas (LNG) in the world. It sold its first cargo of LNG from Singapore to an Indian buyer. The company is looking globally for potential joint ventures and partnerships to achieve its goal regarding LNG market.

== Saudization ==
The original concession agreement included Article 23; as Ali Al-Naimi pointed out, this was a "key building block in the shaping of Saudi society for decades to come." It reads, "The enterprise under this contract shall be directed and supervised by Americans who shall employ Saudi nationals as far as practicable, and in so far as the company can find suitable Saudi employees it will not employ other nationals." The first company school was started in May 1940 in the Al-Khobar home of Hijji bin Jassim, company interpreter, translator and first instructor. Al-Naimi pointed out, "From the beginning, the development of Aramco was directly tied to the betterment of Saudi Arabia." Another school was located in Dhahran in 1941, and was called the Jebel School. Boys hired into entry-level positions attended at 7 AM for four hours, followed by four hours of work in the afternoon. In 1950, Aramco built schools for 2,400 students. In 1959, Aramco sent the first group of Saudi students to college in the States. In 1970, Aramco started hiring its first high school graduates, and in 1979 started offering college scholarships. In 1965, Zafer H. Husseini was named the first Saudi manager and in 1974, Faisal Al-Bassam was named the first Saudi vice president. One of the early students was Al-Naimi, who was named the first Saudi president of Aramco in November 1983. As Al-Naimi states, "The oil company committed itself to developing qualified Saudis to become fully educated and trained industry professionals." Al-Naimi acknowledged Thomas Barger's championing of Saudization, "You, of all of Aramco's leaders, had the greatest vision when you supported the training effort of Saudi Arab employees during its early days. That visionary support and effort is bearing fruit now and many executive positions are filled by Saudis because of that effort." In 1943, 1,600 Saudis were employed at Aramco, but by 1987, nearly two-thirds of Aramco's 43,500 strong workforce were Saudis. In 1988, Al-Naimi became CEO and Hisham Nazer became chairman, the first Saudis to hold those positions. The "pinnacle of Saudization" occurred when the Shaybah oil field came on line in July 1998, after a three-year effort by a team consisting of 90% Saudis. The Aramco of 2016 still maintained an expatriate workforce of about 15%, so Aramco can, in the words of Al-Naimi, "be sure it is getting access to the latest innovations and technical expertise."

Saudi Aramco has emitted 59.26 billion tonnes of carbon dioxide equivalent since it began operations, accounting for 4.38% of worldwide anthropogenic CO_{2} emissions since 1965.

In a letter sent to nine international banks reportedly hired by Aramco to assist it in arranging its US$2 trillion market debut, ten environmental groups warned about the listing causing a highly possible hindrance in the effort to reduce greenhouse gas emissions and end human rights abuses committed by the Saudi regime.

On 6 November 2019, Saudi Aramco joined the World Bank's initiative to reduce gas flaring to zero by 2030. The firm reported flaring of less than 1% of its total raw gas production in the first half of 2019.

== Greenhouse gas emissions ==
According to environmentalists, Aramco is responsible for more than 4% of global greenhouse gas emissions since 1965. Most of this is from the use of the oil they sold, for example burning gasoline in car engines. In greenhouse gas accounting such emissions from use of a product are called "scope 3" emissions. Aramco has no plan to limit scope 3 emissions. However the government says it will have net zero carbon emissions by 2060 within the country. In October 2023, Saudi Aramco announced a direct air capture pilot programme in partnership with Siemens Energy to be completed in 2024.

On 9 December 2024, Aramco along with SLB and Linde signed an agreement to build a carbon capture and storage project in Jubail, Saudi Arabia. Aramco will be owning 60% of the project while SLB and Linde will hold 20% each. The first phase has been estimated to be completed by the end of 2027, while capturing and storing up to 9 million metric tons of carbon dioxide each year, or about one half of one percent of its scope 3 emissions.

== Controversies ==
=== 2007 Haradh gas pipeline explosion ===
On 18 November 2007, reports came out that a natural gas pipeline explosion had taken the lives of several workers, the death toll was later determined to be 34. Aramco asserts it was a purely maintenance-related incident.

=== Organisational culture ===
On 9 December 2020, the Financial Times published an article about an engineer, whose family claims that Saudi Aramco was negligent in handling his COVID-19 infection. According to his family, he had been asking the company and authorities for help, three weeks before his death, but was simply asked to keep his gloves and mask on. Saudi Aramco did not formally contact his family until approximately 14 hours after his death, refused to release his body, and allegedly erased information from his mobile phone. His grieving family had to do without financial support for almost five months, and only received $400,000 in benefits, back pay and insurance after the Financial Times had started asking questions.

In the same article, five whistleblowers accuse Aramco of bullying and mismanagement. One former employee expressed his concerns about the company's highly dangerous failure to pressure-test valves and mains units, detailing cracks in the refinery structure and sinking of roads and foundations. The refinery runs a real risk of becoming Aramco's Piper Alpha, said another expatriate employee, who also accuses Aramco of lacking a culture of challenge, facilitating ineptitude and laziness.

=== Treatment of workers ===
In March 2020, Saudi Aramco came under fire after photos of a migrant worker dressed as a large hand-sanitiser dispenser went viral on social media. People on Twitter condemned the act as "modern-day slavery," "humiliating" and "dehumanizing." According to the company, the display was organised without the approval of Aramco officials.

In May 2026, FairSquare published a report with documents of 23 alleged labour-rights cases involving Aramco contractor and subcontractor employees. Aramco responded by implementing a contractor-workforce wellbeing program, stating that wellbeing and safety are core company values.

=== Strong-arming investors ===
In 2019, sources told the Financial Times that wealthy families of Saudi Arabia had been coerced into joining the Saudi Aramco IPO.

== Lobbying and research projects ==
Saudi Aramco has funded almost 500 studies in last five years on energy issues and collaborated with the United States Department of Energy on projects to boost oil production, such as developing more efficient gasoline, enhanced oil recovery and methods to increase the flow of oil from wells. Since 2016, Saudi Arabia has spent around $140 million on lobbying to influence public opinion and policies in the US. In an effort to keep gasoline cars competitive, Saudi Aramco is working on a device which would trap some of the carbon dioxide upon attaching it to cars running on gasoline. Saudi Aramco has partnered with Hyundai to develop a fuel for gas-electric vehicles which will run on petroleum.

== Publication ==
- Aramco World magazine, formerly Saudi Aramco World

== See also ==
- Abqaiq
- AMR GP (a Formula 1 team with Aramco as its main sponsor)
- Aramco Financial Services Company
- Aramco Training Services Company
- Discovery! The Search for Arabian Oil
- Ghawar
- Golden gimmick
- Hui-Hai Liu
- List of oil fields: All of those located in Saudi Arabia are owned by Saudi Aramco.
- Max Steineke
- Shamoon
- Thomas Barger
- List of largest companies of Saudi Arabia
- List of public corporations by market capitalization
- Saudi Aramco Residential Camp in Dhahran
- Ras Tanura
- Shaybah
- Udhailiyah
- Yanbu

== Bibliography ==
- Vitalis, Robert (2006). America's Kingdom: Mythmaking on the Saudi Oil Frontier. Stanford: Stanford University Press. ISBN 978-0-8047-5446-0.
