= Kenana Sugar Company =

Sudanese sugar company

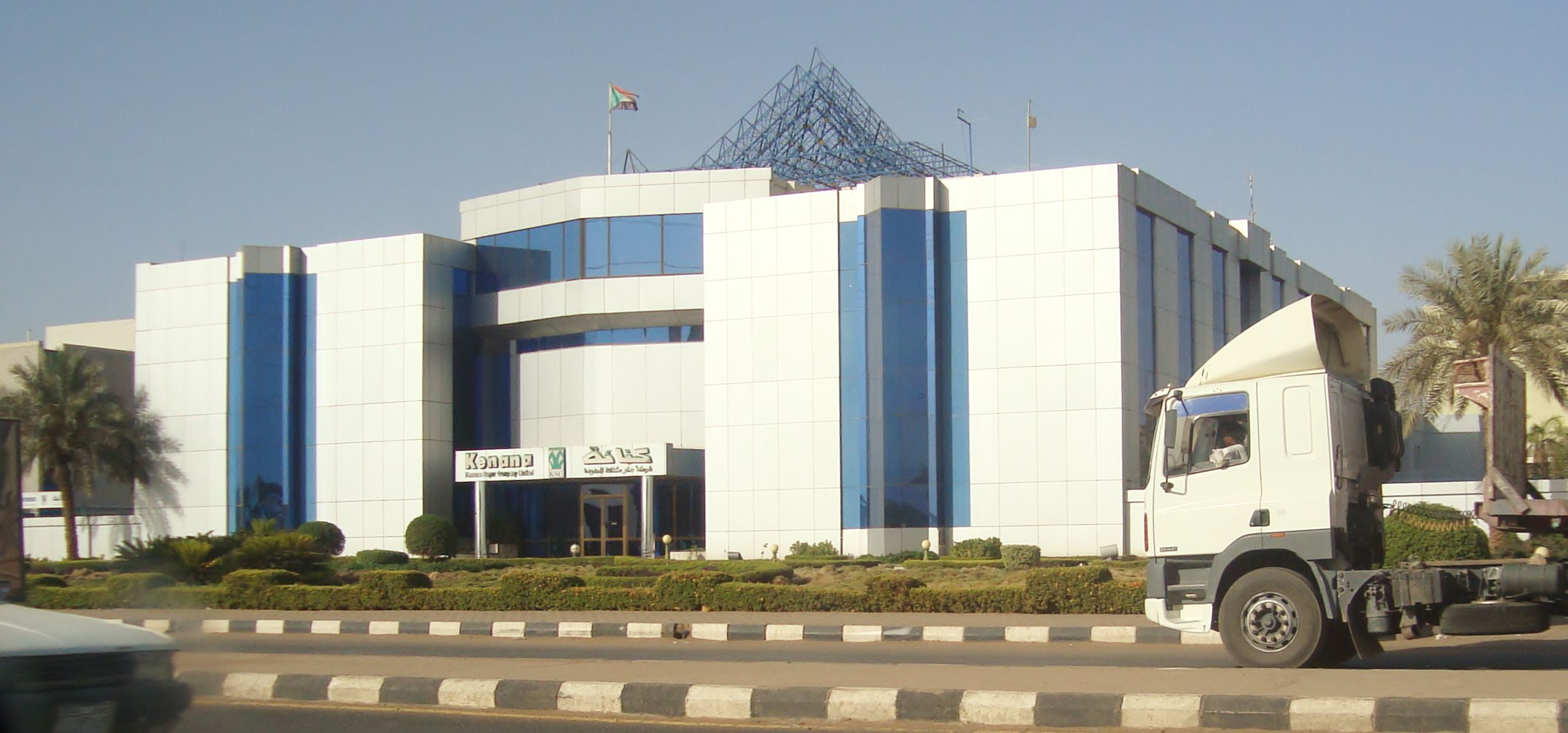
- Kenana Sugar Company headquarters building
- Type: Private
- Industry: Food processing Renewable energy
- Founded: March 1975; 51 years ago
- Headquarters: Khartoum, Khartoum State, Sudan
- Key people: Tiny Rowland
- Products: Sugar; Animal feed Ethanol; Renewable energy Poultry meat Charcoal; Molasses
- Revenue: US$400 million
- Number of employees: 16,500 (2017)
- Website: kenanasugarcompany.com (defunct) kenana.com (defunct)

Kenana Sugar Company Limited (KSC; Arabic: شركة سكر كنانة) is a Sudanese agro-industrial company specializing in the production of sugar and related products. It operates one of the largest sugar refineries in the country of Sudan, which has a land area of 165,000 acres (258 sq mi).

As one of the six main sugar factories in the country, the company is also regarded as one of the "largest sugar agro-complexes in Africa." Kenana Sugar Company is registered under the registration number 1152, and was also, at the time of construction, one of the two main sugar companies where their main plants are in White Nile State, the second being the Assalaya Sugar Company.

== History ==
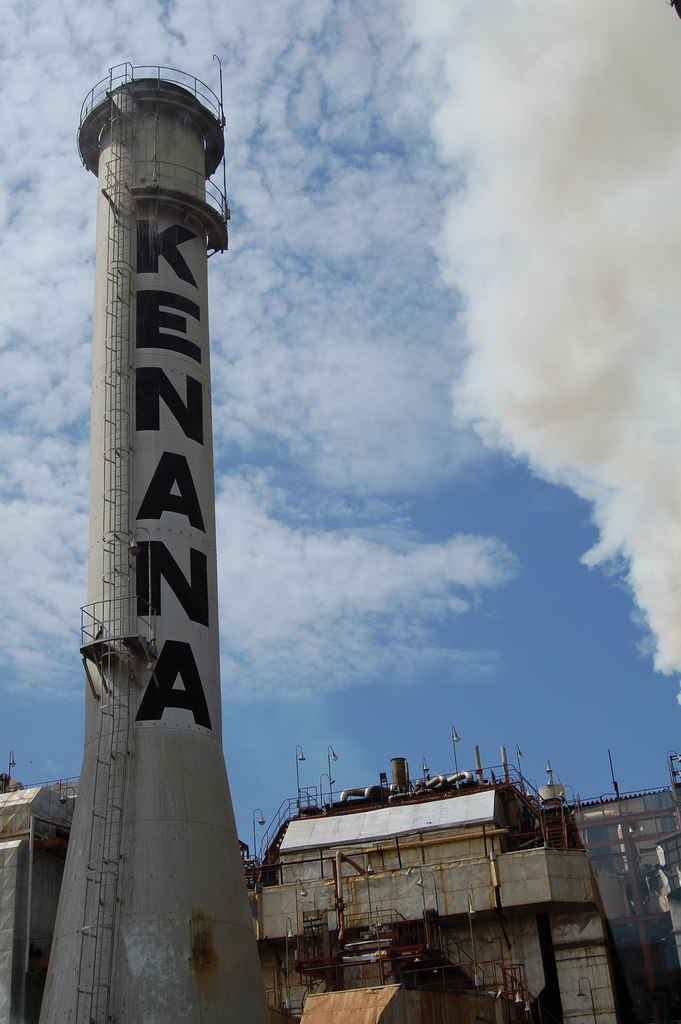
Smokestack at the Kenana Sugar Company plant

On 9 June 1972, the Sudanese government and Tiny Rowland, the founder of the Lonrho company, agreed to the proposal of establishing a production venture involving sugar, dubbed the "Sugar Agreement".

This agreement led to the company’s establishment in 1975 as a joint venture between the Sudanese government and Rowland, with international investors from the Kuwait Investment Authority, government of Saudi Arabia, AAAID, Sudanese commercial banks, and among other related investors. By July 1975, the company bought land initially spanning around 160,000 acres (250 sq mi) situated 21 km (13 mi) south of Rabak, which will later be the main site of the company's productions. The acquired estate was a major gravel outcrop and was a site of fertile clay soil, which was capable enough for the cultivation of sugarcane. It is also situated just east of the airbase of Kenana Airport which will serve the factory, and will also be controlled by the Sudanese Armed Forces later on.

With the first foundation stone laid in November 1976, the company was commissioned five years after its founding, and began processing sugarcane in 1980, marking the start of its commercial operations on refined sugar. Production began in either March 1981 or 1984, initially focused on the making and marketing of sugar. By 1991, exports began as the years before that their production was only for domestic use.

Another company, the White Nile Sugar Company (WNSC), was established in 2003, with its factory located along the White Nile as well. In addition to sugar production, the company manufactures animal feed, ethanol, and electricity. Kenana is the largest single shareholder, holding a 31.1% stake in the company, which generates annual sales of approximately 10 billion Sudanese pounds. The capital investment of the new sugar company amounted to 1.1 billion USD. The sugar company was also linked to a 2012 sanctions-related incident affecting the plant’s commissioning.

By 2009, an ethanol plant was established at the factory, producing around 60 or 65 million litres per year. In April of that same year, the company had a financial crisis, leading to the dismissal of 959 workers. They were ferried to the town of Renk, in northern South Sudan, in which they were brought to a church, but were without any food or water.

In 2013, Saudi Arabia and Kuwait provided the sugar company with US$500,000 to support its plan to double production to 1 million tonnes by 2015.

On 28 February 2017, then-president of the African Development Bank, Dr. Akinwumi Adesina, visited the main plant.

On 19 August 2020, hundreds of company workers started going on strike in front of Kenana's Workers Union and held a vigil during the 2019–2022 Sudanese protests. Due to this, the mass dismissals of over 700 employees were issued almost two years after the protests. Two thousand workers across all departments of the company were expected to be dismissed in the following days.

The main refinery in Rabak has seen major decline in the 2020s, as the beginning of the Sudanese civil war in 2023 marked nationwide sugar production decreasing due to the Rapid Support Forces targeting infrastructure and factories alike. The factory, which was built to handle 400,000 tonnes of sugar, saw only about 250,000 tonnes produced annually in recent years due to the conflict. By 2024, with only about 125,000 tonnes in production, it was reported as one of the only factories still operating during the civil war. On 3 May 2026, the ethanol plant of the factory was targeted and struck by two RSF drones, leaving significant damage at the plant. Photos and videos from people who were near the site showed smoke rising from the plant.

== Operations ==
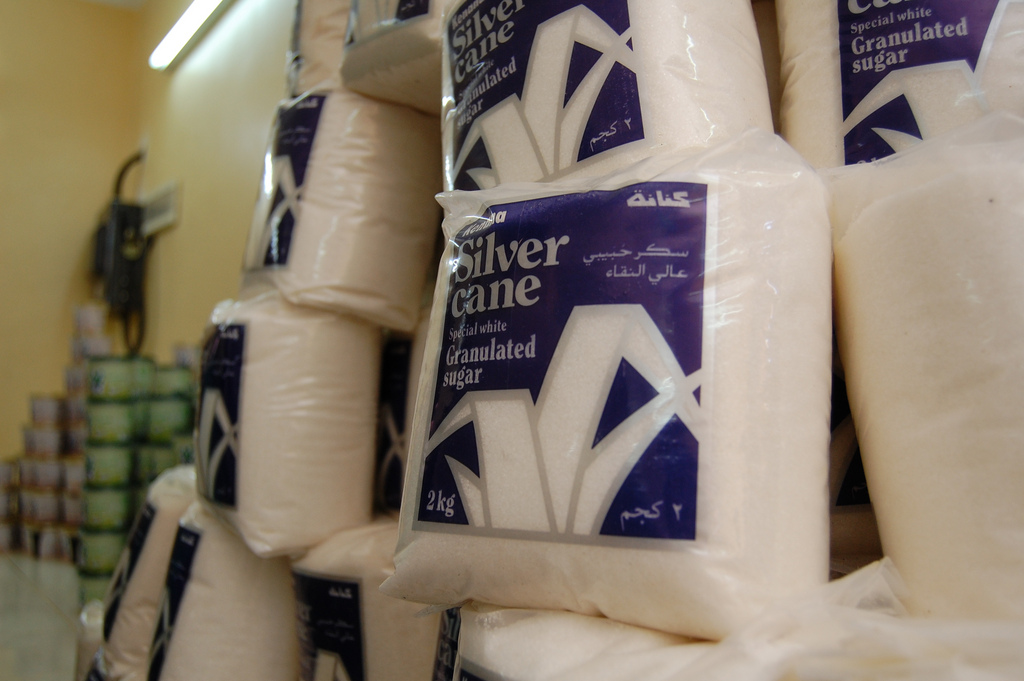

The company's designed production capacity includes the following:

- Raw sugar: 400,000 tonnes per year
- Molasses: 130,000 tonnes per year
- Fodder: 80,000 tonnes per year
- Ethanol: 60–65 million litres per year
- Electricity: 115 MW
- Poultry meat: 3 million kg per year

Kenana Sugar Company also operates livestock facilities, including a fattening unit with a capacity of 20,000 head of cattle, as well as a dairy unit. Their main plant is in Rabak, with also having operations in Kosti. The company also produces biofuels, such as ethanol, in which 90% are exported to the European Union. Most of the output is locally distributed, meanwhile the remainder gets exported to other continents. The company also treats vinasse, a byproduct of ethanol production, by converting it into biogas, reducing disposal costs and environmental impact. They also produce and sell molasses, a byproduct of sugar production, to Great Britain and the Netherlands. The site in Rabak also includes Sufeiya Iron Works, an on-site facility owned by Kenana used for manufacturing spare parts and maintaining mill equipment. Meanwhile, their subsidiary, Kenana Friesland, is the largest supplier of dairy products in the entirety of Sudan, mainly producing milk, yogurt, and cheese.

The company's headquarters is located in Khartoum. The 16,500 employees include both seasonal workers (9,000) and permanent workers (7,500), with average productivity levels of 89.62 per working machine hour, 80.67 per labor, and 43.5 per feddan, alongside an extraction rate of 0.10, all higher than those recorded for other Sudanese sugar companies in a comparative study on the productivity of sugar workers in the country.

=== Production of sugarcane ===
Kenana uses wagons to transport harvested sugarcane, in contrast to the trailers commonly used by other Sudanese sugar companies. Sugarcane in Sudan is usually mechanically harvested using combine harvesters, which cut cane into billets and transport it to mills using trailers running alongside the harvesters. The company also sometimes cultivates multiple sugarcane varieties, within the same plots of farmland. Raw sugarcane from trucks is transferred onto a conveyor system for direct transport into the factory. The plant processed approximately 20,000 tonnes of sugarcane per day in the fiscal year of 2008–09.

In the main plant, there are four pump stations that work as an irrigation system, which all total to 44 m^{3} (1,600 ft^{3}) in storage. The estate is irrigated through a canal network supplied by the White Nile, stretching around 329 kilometres (204 mi) in total, and is supported by an extensive road system for the factory and its surrounding related localities.

== See also ==
- Agriculture in Sudan
- Economy of Sudan
  - Economic history of Sudan
- Illovo Sugar
- Tiny Rowland
  - Lonrho
