= Kenana Airport =

Airport in Sudan

Kenana Airstrip
- IATA: none; ICAO: HSKN

Summary
- Airport type: Public / Military
- Serves: Sifeiya, Kenana Sugar Company
- Elevation AMSL: 1,288 ft / 393 m
- Coordinates: 13°03′15″N 32°54′25″E

Map
- Location of the airport in Sudan

Runways
Direction	Length		Surface
Direction	ft	m	Surface
18/36	6,430	1,960	Dirt
- Source: Google Maps

Kenana Airport (ICAO: HSKN) is an airstrip serving the production site of Kenana Sugar Company, approximately 20 kilometres (12 mi) southeast of Rabak in Sudan.

The Kenana (KNA) VOR-DME lies 1 mile (1.6 km) south, off the end of the runway.

Sifeiya is the community surrounding the airport, and adjacent to the sugar plantation owned by the Kenana Sugar Company.

== Kenana Air Base ==
The airport hosts two Sudanese Air Force units

- Transport Training Squadron (Antonov An-2)
- Helicopter Training School (Mil Mi-2)

== See also ==
- Transport in Sudan
