= Kosti, Sudan =

Place in White Nile State, Sudan

Kosti كوستي
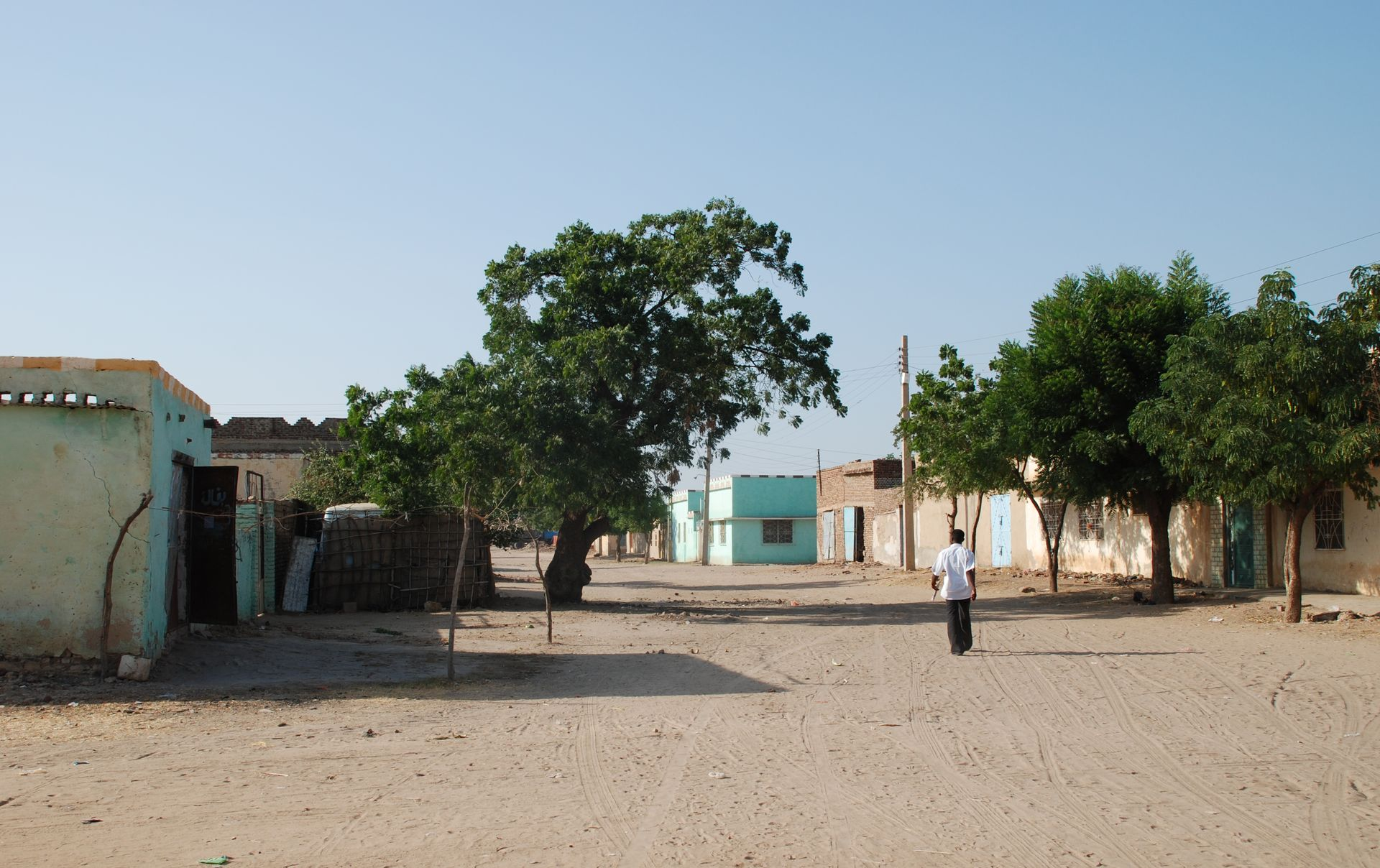
- Kosti Residential Area

- Location in Sudan
- Coordinates: 13°10′N 32°40′E
- Country: Sudan
- State: White Nile
- Elevation: 1,250 ft (380 m)

Population (2012)
  - Total: 345,068

Kosti (also Kusti, Arabic: كوستي) is one of the major cities in Sudan that lies south of Khartoum, the capital of Sudan, and stands on the western bank of the White Nile river opposite Rabak, the capital of the White Nile state and is connected to it by a bridge. The city is served by Kosti Railway Station and Rabak Airport. The population of Kosti as of 2012 was estimated at 345,068 people.

== History ==
Kosti was founded shortly after 1899 by the Greek merchant Konstantinos "Kostas" Mourikis, who arrived in Sudan along with his brother following the Anglo-Egyptian victory over the indigenous Mahdist state. He set up a store on the White Nile, where pilgrims from West Africa to Mecca and Southern trade routes crossed. The settlement soon grew to a town and was named after "Kostas", illustrating the important role played by the Greeks in Sudan, especially in the field of trade. In 1911, the Goz Abu Goma Bridge connecting Rabak and Kosti was completed

In May 2023, clashes between Nuba and Hausa groups led to the deaths of 29 people in Kosti.

=== Displacement site ===
Kosti received large numbers of displaced people from the early 1980s, mainly from southern Sudan, Darfur, Kordofan and elsewhere in White Nile State. In 1992, the IDP camps were relocated from Combo to Goz Al Salam and Allaya, about 4 to 6 km southeast of Kosti. Most residents of the two camps belonged to southern ethnic groups, including the Dinka, Shilluk, Nuer, Latoka and Bari.

Many residents had lost their former agro-pastoral livelihoods and were generally unable to obtain land for cultivation near Kosti. Some travelled to central and eastern Sudan for seasonal agricultural work, while others relied on fishing, growing rice for sale, petty trade, domestic work and casual labour. In 2002, Dan Kuch, Goz Es Salam and Liya were identified as particularly vulnerable IDP camps in Kosti. IDPs in White Nile State faced malnutrition, waterborne diseases, a lack of sanitation services and inadequate schools, health centres and trained personnel.

A 2002 UN report stated that Kosti had about 3,000 street children, the second-largest concentration in Sudan after Khartoum. It linked prolonged displacement among the city’s IDP population to family disintegration and relative increases in orphans, female-headed households and unemployment.

Since early March 2026, Goz Al Salam’s population has grown by more than 3,000 to approximately 30,000. The camp remains overcrowded, with shortages of shelter, food and other essential supplies. Water, sanitation and hygiene services have not kept pace with new arrivals, placing further strain on limited facilities.

== Economy ==
The large Kenana Sugar Factory is located south of Rabak, east of the city.

Kosti is home to the El Imam El Mahdi University, established in 1994 as a public university funded by the Ministry of Higher Education and Scientific Research. It is named in honor of Muhammad Ahmad, the leader of the Mahdia revolution in Sudan (1885-1898).

== Climate ==
Kosti has a hot desert climate (BWh) according to the Köppen climate classification. Like most of Sudan, the city has a very dry climate. The climate stays hot throughout the year, even into November temperatures still break 100 °F (38 °C).

Climate data for Kosti (1991–2020, extremes 1961–2020)
Month	Jan	Feb	Mar	Apr	May	Jun	Jul	Aug	Sep	Oct	Nov	Dec	Year
Record high °C (°F)	42 (108)	44 (111)	45.8 (114.4)	46.5 (115.7)	46.8 (116.2)	46 (115)	43.5 (110.3)	40 (104)	42 (108)	42.6 (108.7)	42 (108)	41.5 (106.7)	46.8 (116.2)
Mean daily maximum °C (°F)	32.8 (91.0)	35.3 (95.5)	38.7 (101.7)	41.6 (106.9)	41.2 (106.2)	39.0 (102.2)	34.9 (94.8)	33.2 (91.8)	35.3 (95.5)	38.0 (100.4)	36.6 (97.9)	33.7 (92.7)	36.7 (98.1)
Daily mean °C (°F)	24.9 (76.8)	27.0 (80.6)	30.1 (86.2)	33.0 (91.4)	33.8 (92.8)	32.5 (90.5)	29.6 (85.3)	28.3 (82.9)	29.6 (85.3)	31.2 (88.2)	29.2 (84.6)	26.1 (79.0)	29.6 (85.3)
Mean daily minimum °C (°F)	17.1 (62.8)	18.7 (65.7)	21.4 (70.5)	24.5 (76.1)	26.5 (79.7)	25.9 (78.6)	24.3 (75.7)	23.4 (74.1)	23.9 (75.0)	24.5 (76.1)	21.8 (71.2)	18.5 (65.3)	22.5 (72.5)
Record low °C (°F)	8.4 (47.1)	8 (46)	11.2 (52.2)	14 (57)	17.3 (63.1)	18.5 (65.3)	16.2 (61.2)	18.5 (65.3)	18.8 (65.8)	14.5 (58.1)	13.1 (55.6)	7.5 (45.5)	7.5 (45.5)
Average precipitation mm (inches)	0.1 (0.00)	0.0 (0.0)	0.0 (0.0)	0.5 (0.02)	18.3 (0.72)	31.4 (1.24)	118.6 (4.67)	135.4 (5.33)	56.6 (2.23)	7.4 (0.29)	0.1 (0.00)	0.0 (0.0)	368.4 (14.50)
Average precipitation days (≥ 1.0 mm)	0.0	0.0	0.0	0.2	1.8	3.3	8.5	10.1	4.1	1.3	0.0	0.0	29.3
Average relative humidity (%)	37	30	25	24	35	47	63	72	65	51	37	39	44
Mean monthly sunshine hours	297.6	271.6	285.2	279.0	260.4	231.0	195.3	195.3	225.0	275.9	294.0	310.0	3,120.3
Source: NOAA

== Gallery ==
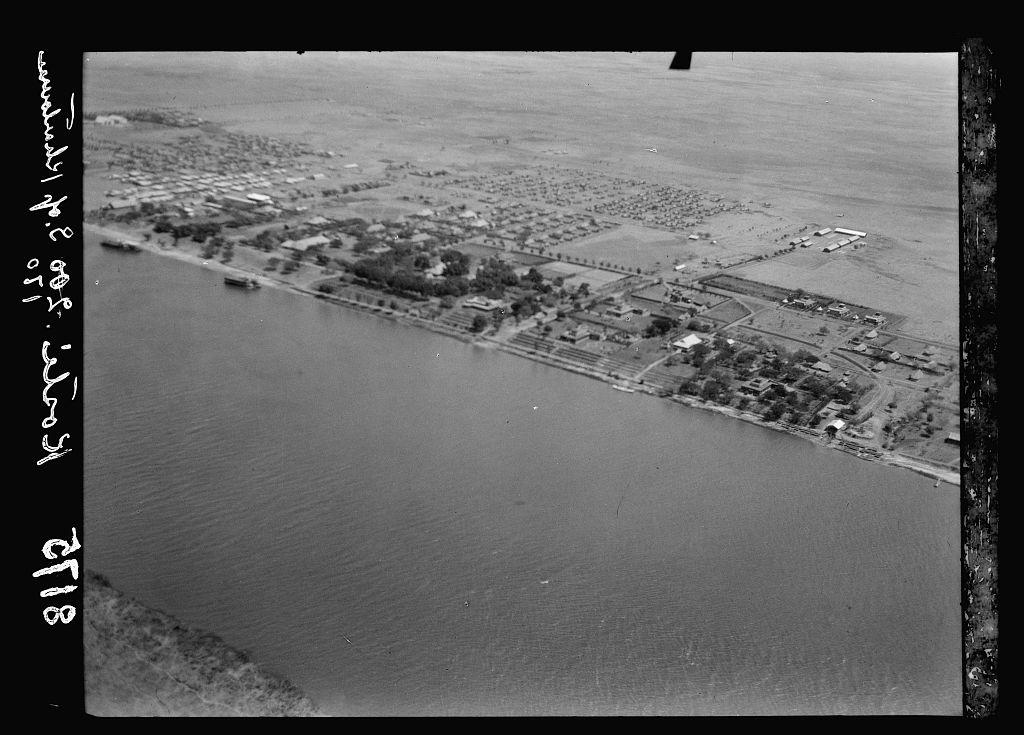
Historical aerial view of Kosti, 1936

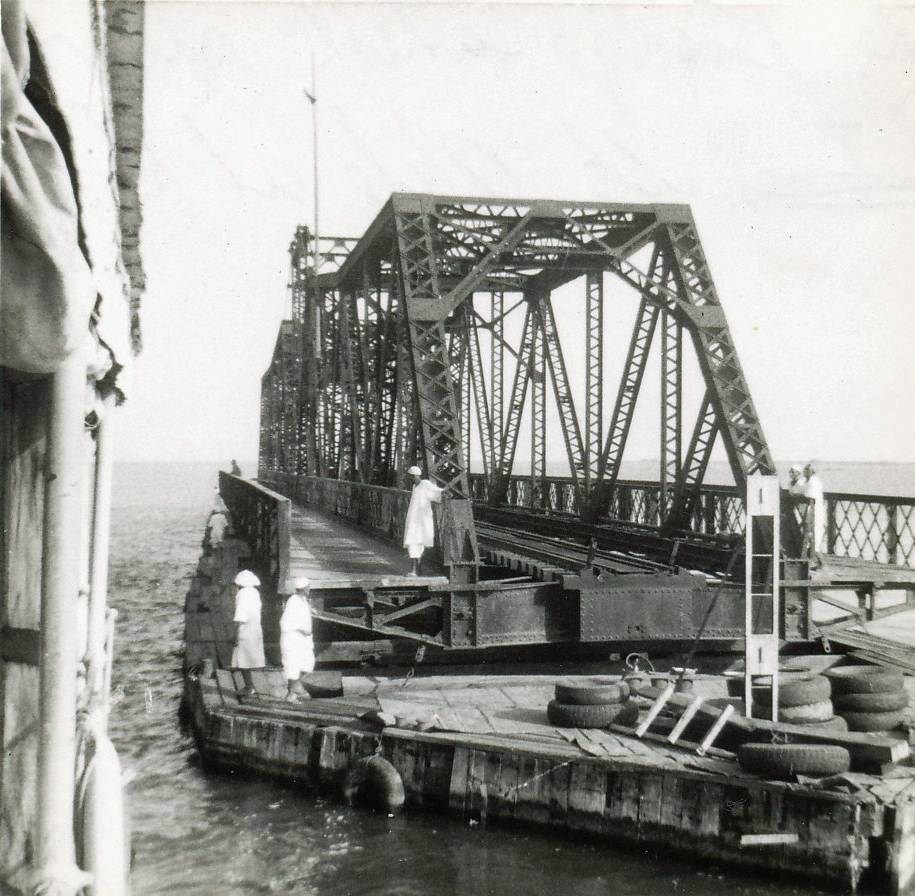
Former White Nile railway swing bridge, 1966

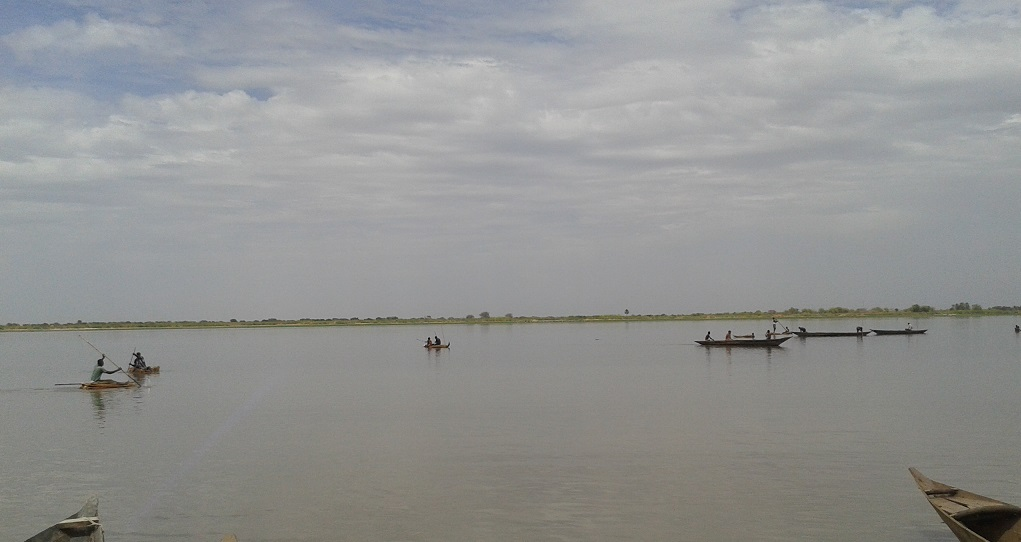
Fishing on the White Nile

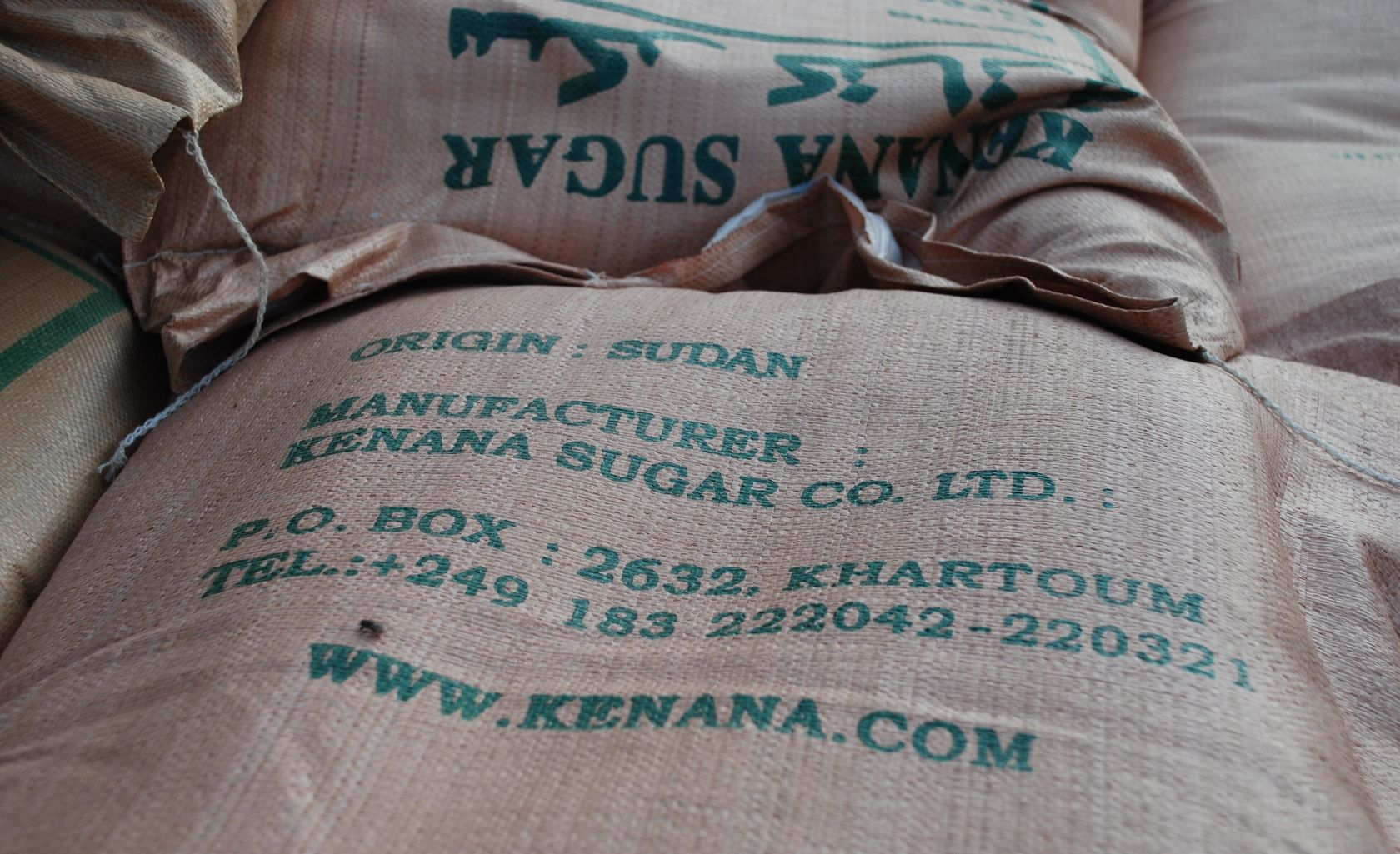
Packs of Kenana sugar at a Kosti plant

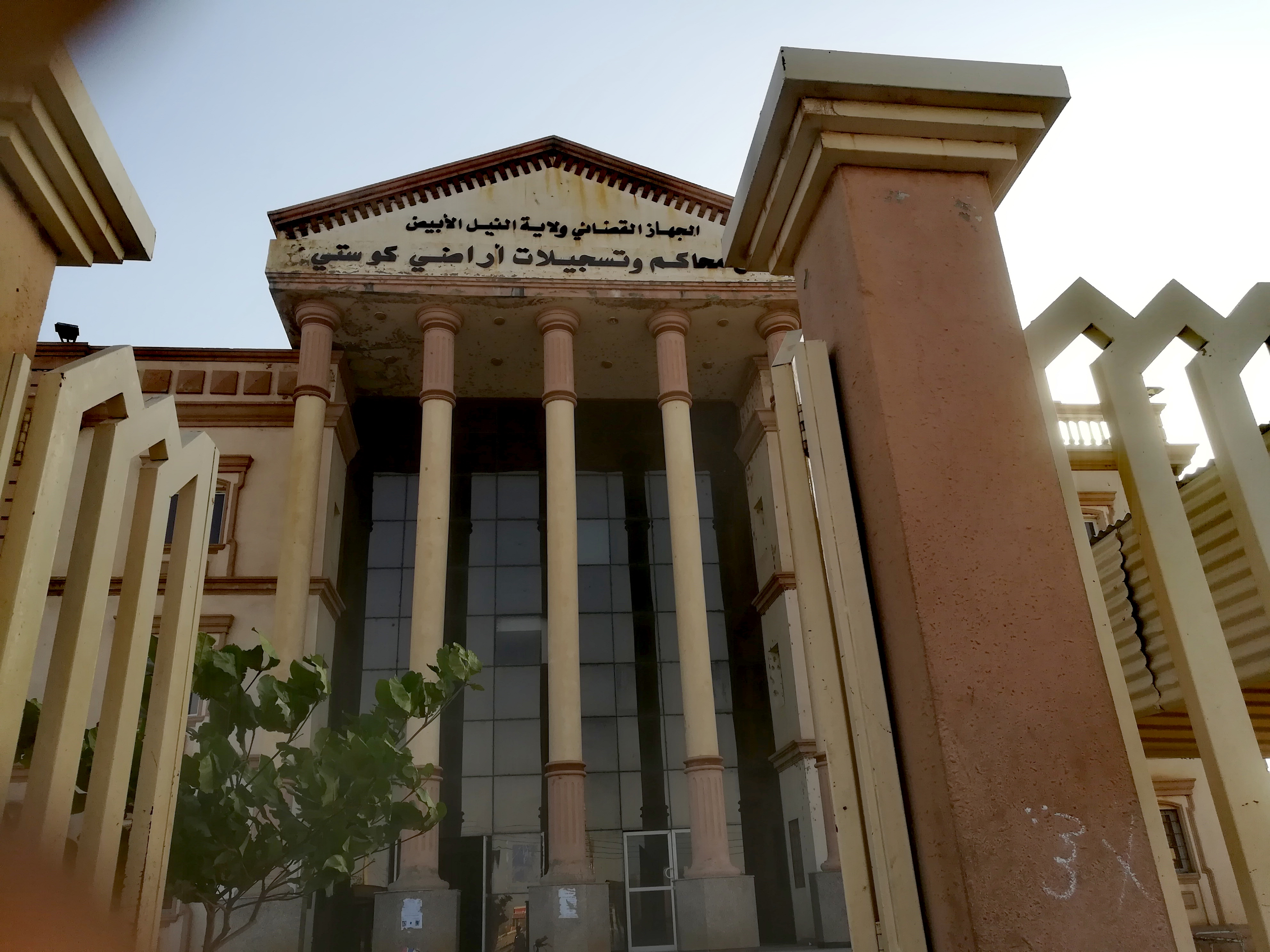
Kosti court complex

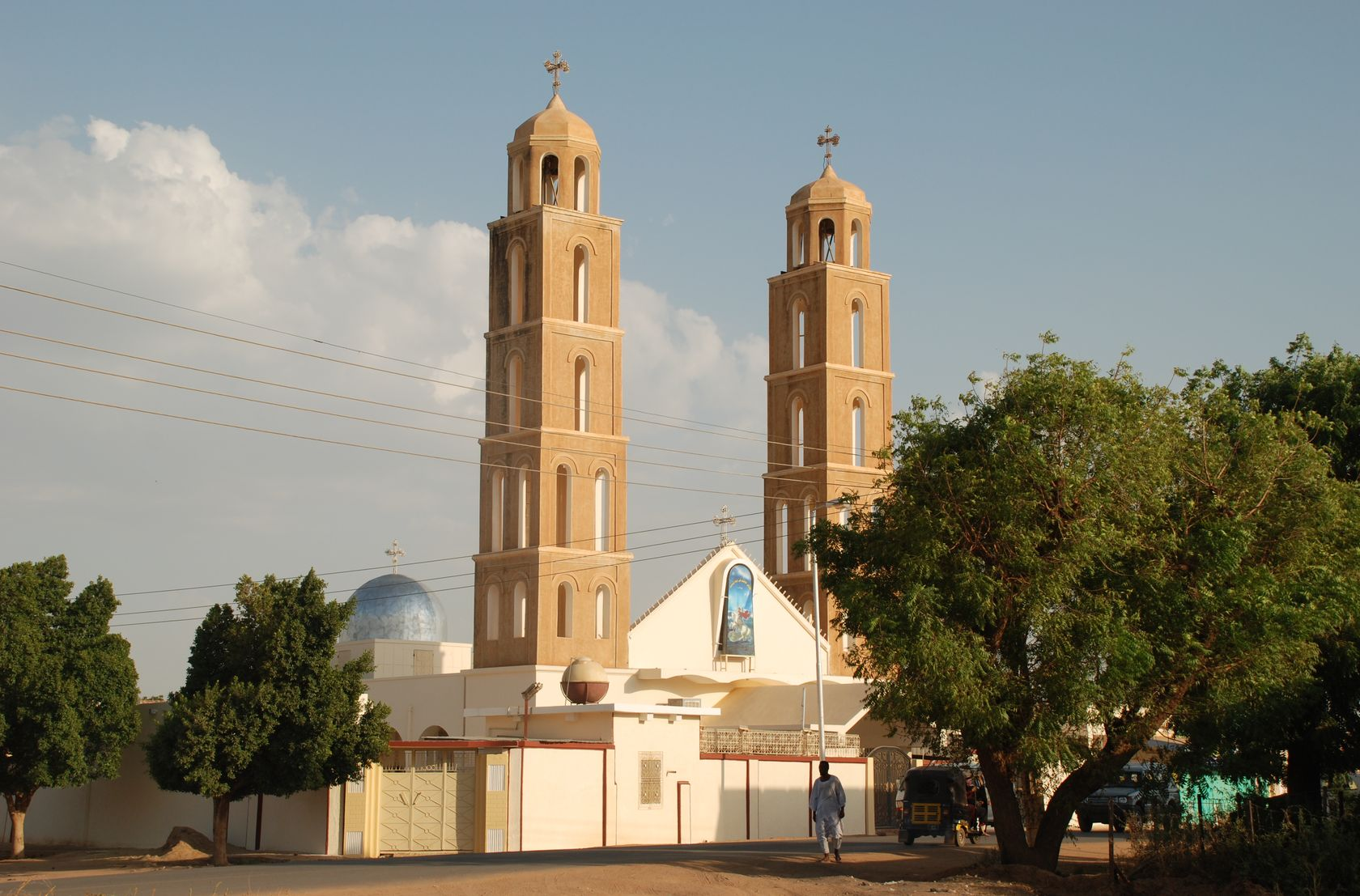
Coptic church

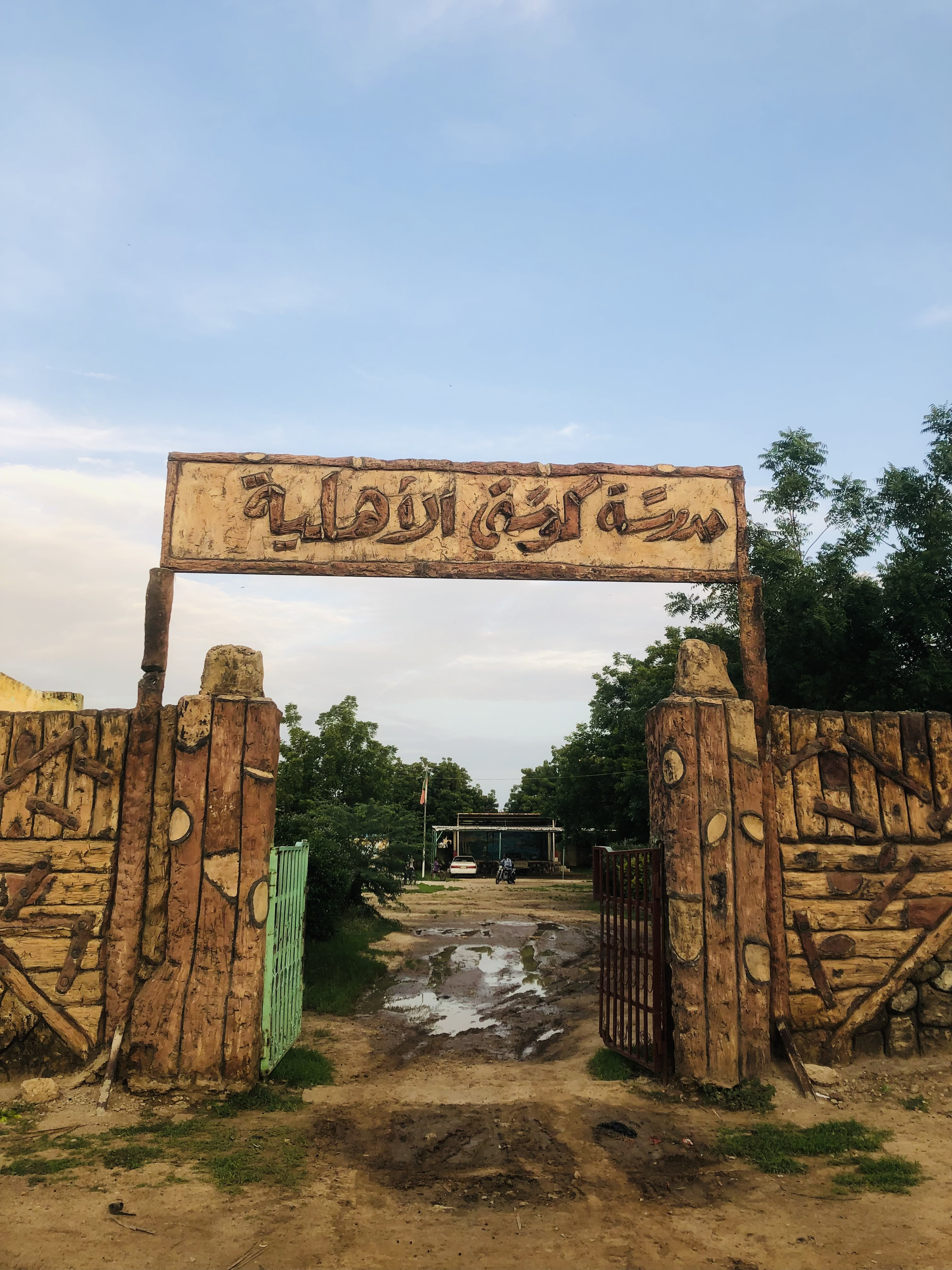
Primary school in Kosti

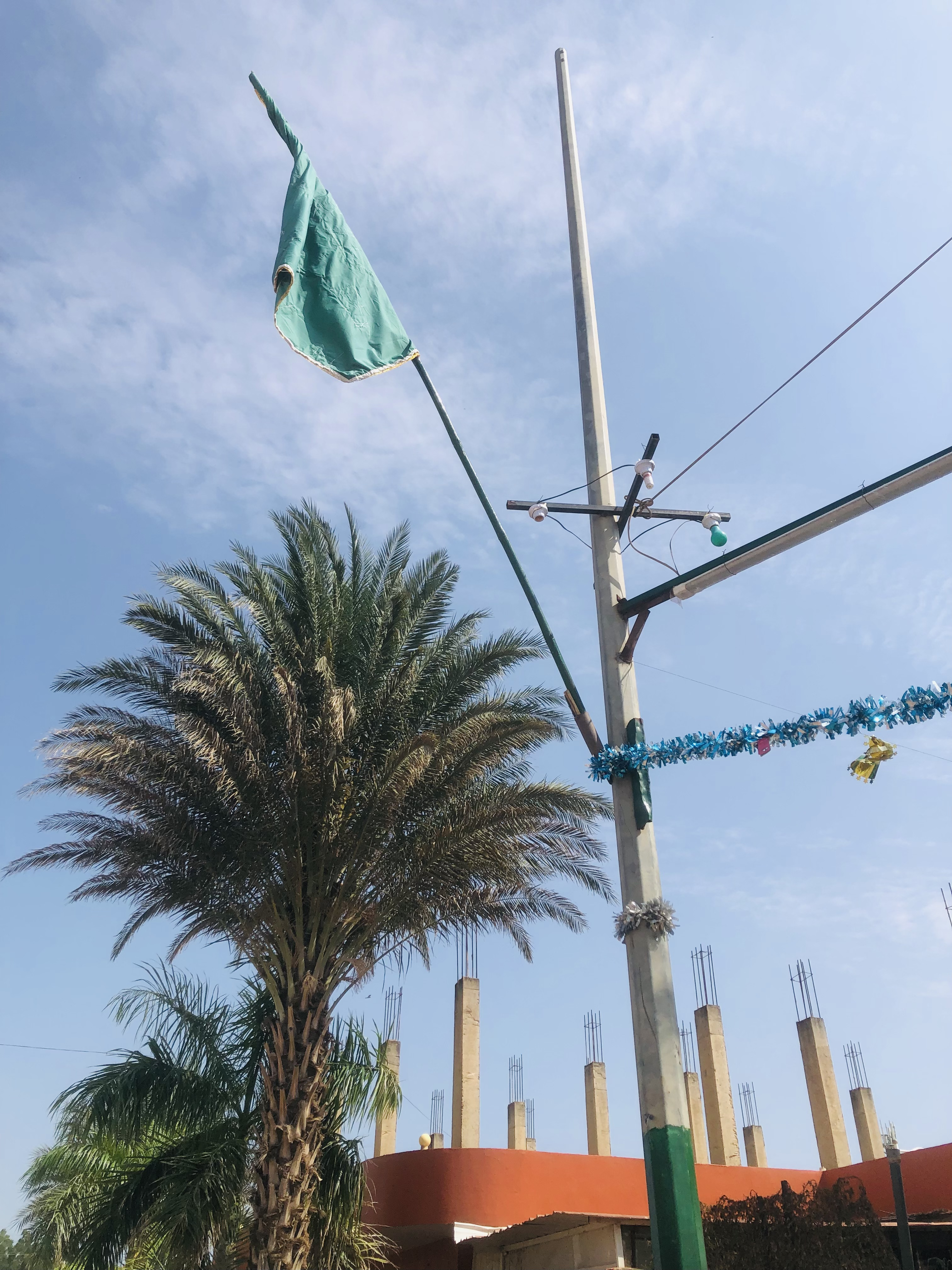
During the 2023 Mawlid celebrations

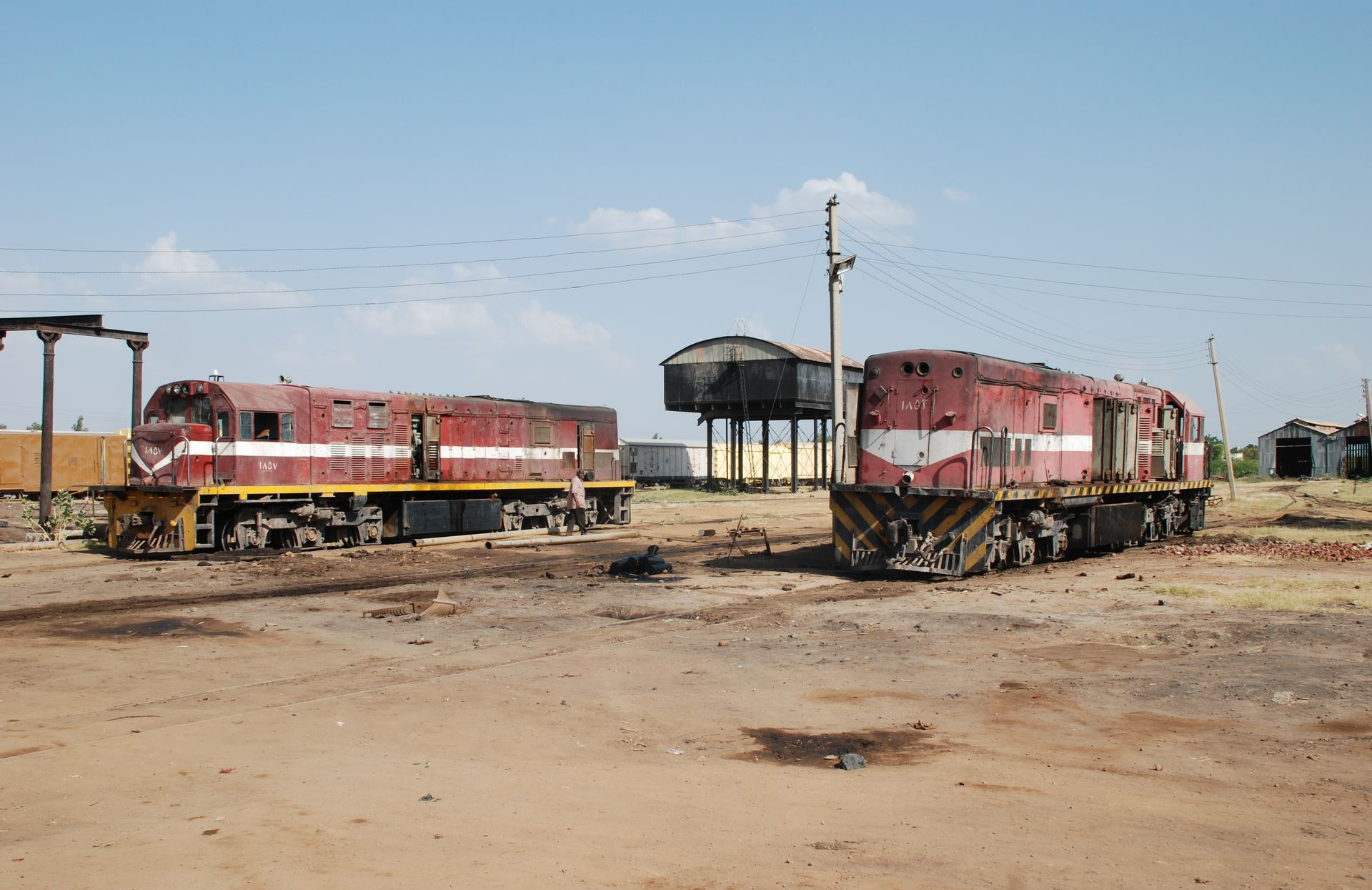
Railway station

== See also ==
- Railway stations in Sudan
