= Te Ara Pekapeka Bridge =

Bridge in Hamilton, New Zealand

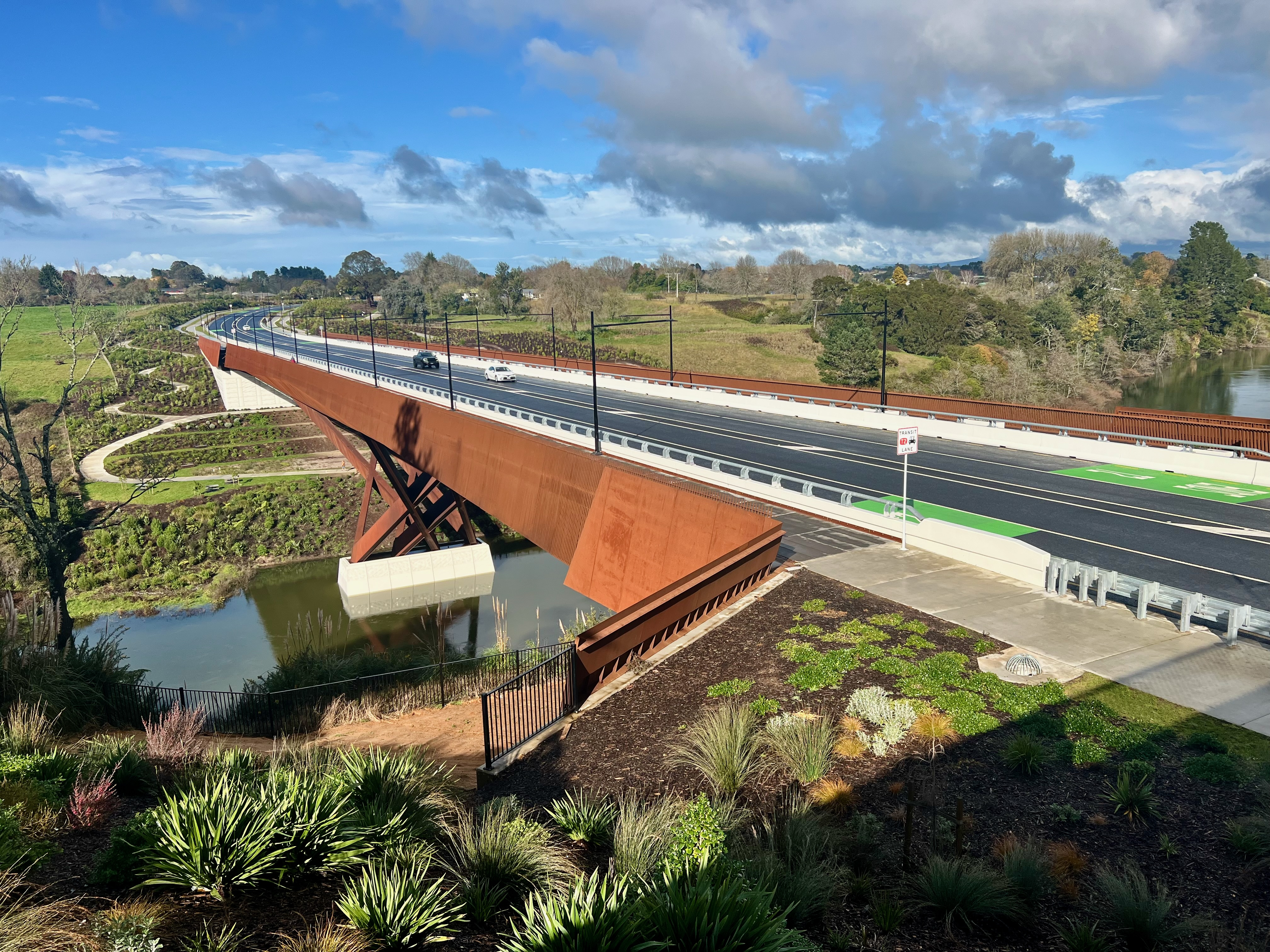
- Te Ara Pekapeka Bridge from NE in 2025
- Coordinates: 37°48′16.6″S 175°18′45.3″E
- Carries: Motor vehicles, bicycles, pedestrians
- Crosses: Waikato River
- Owner: Hamilton City Council
- Preceded by: Narrows Bridge
- Followed by: Cobham Bridge

Characteristics
- Total length: 215 metres (705 ft)
- Width: 26.2 metres (86 ft)
- Height: 30 metres (98 ft)
- Longest span: 70 metres (230 ft)

History
- Designer: Bloxam Burnett & Olliver
- Constructed by: HEB Construction
- Construction start: 2020
- Opened: 30 August 2024

Location
- Interactive map of Te Ara Pekapeka Bridge

Te Ara Pekapeka Bridge (Māori for pathway of the bat) is a girder bridge over the Waikato River in Hamilton, New Zealand, opened to pedestrians and cyclists on 30 August 2024 and known as Peacocke Bridge during construction. The bridge on Wairere Drive is part of the Southern Links, a ring road around Hamilton. It links Hamilton East with a new suburb of Peacocke. Construction started in 2020, though the plan originated in 1962.

== Construction ==
The bridge is formed with 2,650 tonnes of steel, was expected to be completed by mid 2024, at a cost of $160.2M, though budgeted at $135M in 2020, estimated at no more than $60M in 2017 and formerly at $40M. The bridge was delayed by COVID-19 and Cyclone Gabrielle and other storms. The 4-lane bridge was designed by Bloxam Burnett & Olliver, and built by HEB Construction. It includes bus lanes and cycle paths, and carries the Peacocke to Pukete sewer line. The river was closed to boats during construction.

Both banks of the river were stabilised to support the bridge. The north bank, next to the bridge abutments, has a 50-degree slope, rising 45 metres (148 ft), or 35 metres (115 ft), and was stabilised with 150-millimetre (5.9 in) soil nails. The total length of the bridge is 215 metres (705 ft), including the 11-metre-high (36 ft) mechanically stabilised earth wall of the southern bridge abutment, which is on compressible, loose Taupō Pumice alluvial soils, of the river terraces. The bridge itself is 180 metres (590 ft) long (made up of a 70-metre (230 ft) northern span, 50-metre (160 ft) central span and a 60-metre (200 ft) southern span), 26.2 metres (86 ft) wide, on 38-metre-deep (125 ft), closely spaced, bridge piles, with 35-metre-long (115 ft) earth anchors and over 600 eight-metre-long (26 ft) soil nails. The bridge is over 30 metres (98 ft) above the normal river level.

The main support is a pier on the south bank of the river, formed of weathering steel, in two lattice-shaped, 30-by-22-metre (98 ft × 72 ft) Y sections, each weighing over 200 tonnes. The lattice is made up of 2.2-by-0.82-metre (7.2 ft × 2.7 ft) box-section welded plates. They were lifted into position by a 600-tonne crane.

The bridge was designed to minimise its impact on 54 rest sites of the critically endangered long-tailed bat (pekapeka-touroa), including 30 new roost boxes on trees, with metal bands above and below them to keep predators out, use of warm LED lighting, a shallow bridge profile and removal of vegetation below the bridge so they can fly under, creation of a tree canopy to keep them away from traffic and predator control to protect, bats, copper skinks, native birds and the new trees.

The bridge was opened by Paula Southgate and Simeon Brown, though the plaque on the bridge also records the name of Kīngi Tūheitia, who died on the morning of the bridge opening.

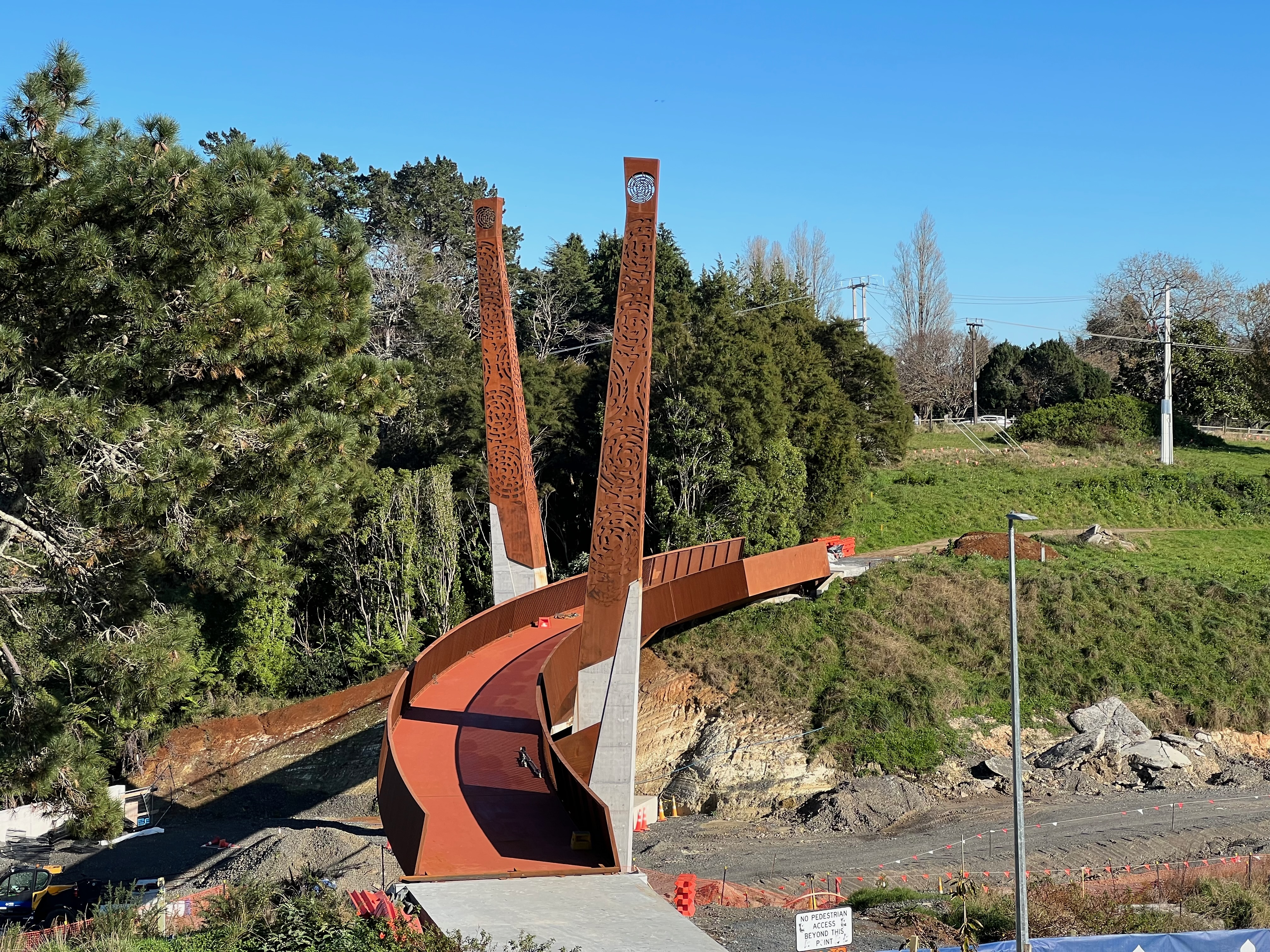
Wairere Drive cycling and pedestrian bridge in 2023

== Awards ==
In 2025, the main bridge and the cycling and pedestrian bridge won the Eugene C. Figg Jr. Medal at the International Bridge Conference Awards.

The bridge also won the supreme award at the 2025 Steel Construction New Zealand (SCNZ) Excellence in Steel Awards.

== Wairere Drive cycling and pedestrian bridge ==
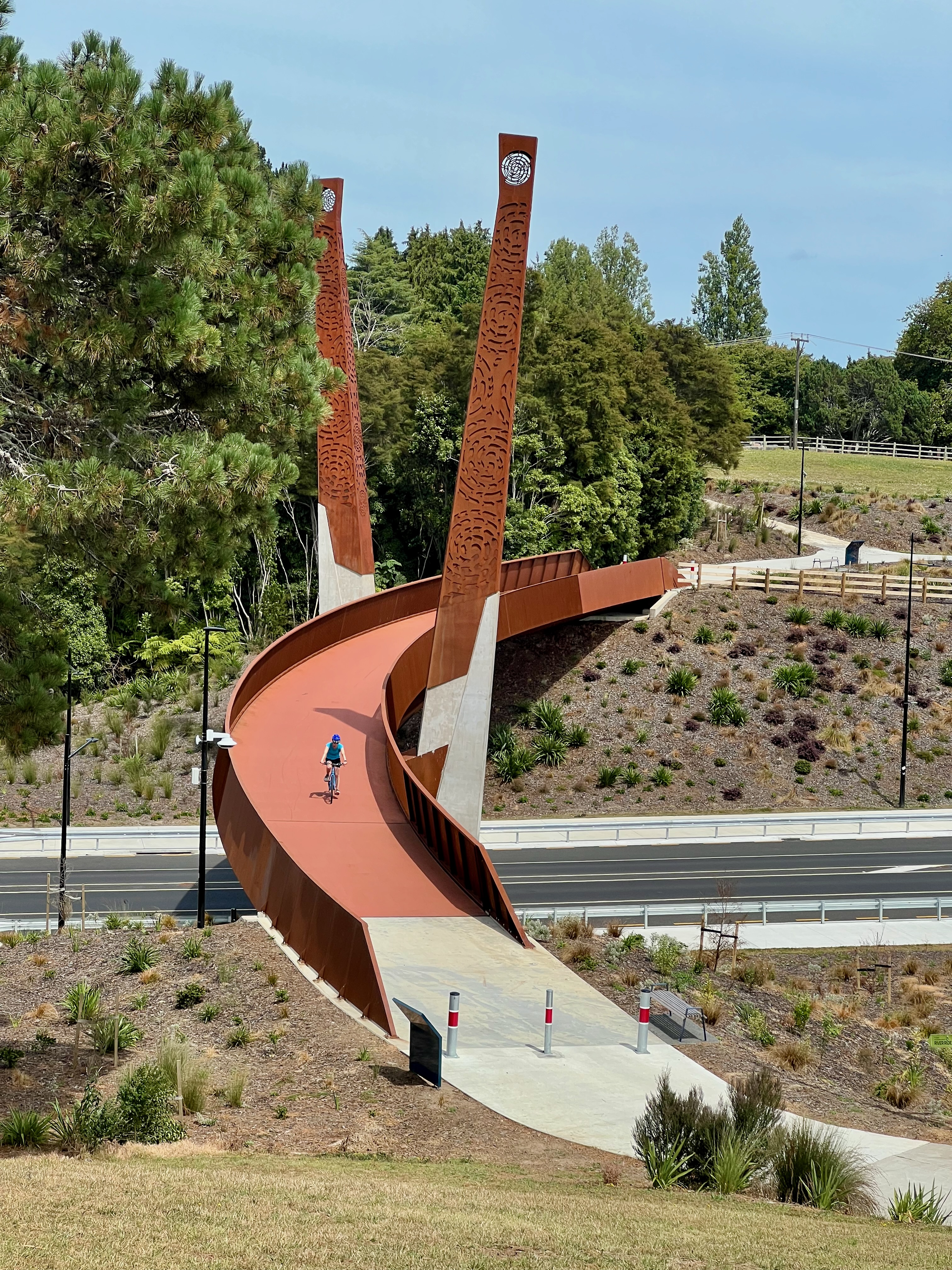
Wairere Drive cycling and pedestrian bridge in 2025

Installation of a 71-metre (233 ft) curved pedestrian/cycleway bridge weighing over 200 tonnes, made up of five weathered-steel sections, 70 metres (230 ft) north of Peacocke Bridge, was started in 2022. The bridge crosses the extension of Wairere Drive, to maintain the Te Awa link to Hamilton Gardens. Māori design is reflected in the bridge, with two 25-metre (82 ft) steel masts, representing a waharoa (gateway), and influenced by a taurapa (carved waka sternpost). The motif is a takarangi (intersecting spiral), as seen on sternposts, denoting a threshold.
