= Cobham Bridge =

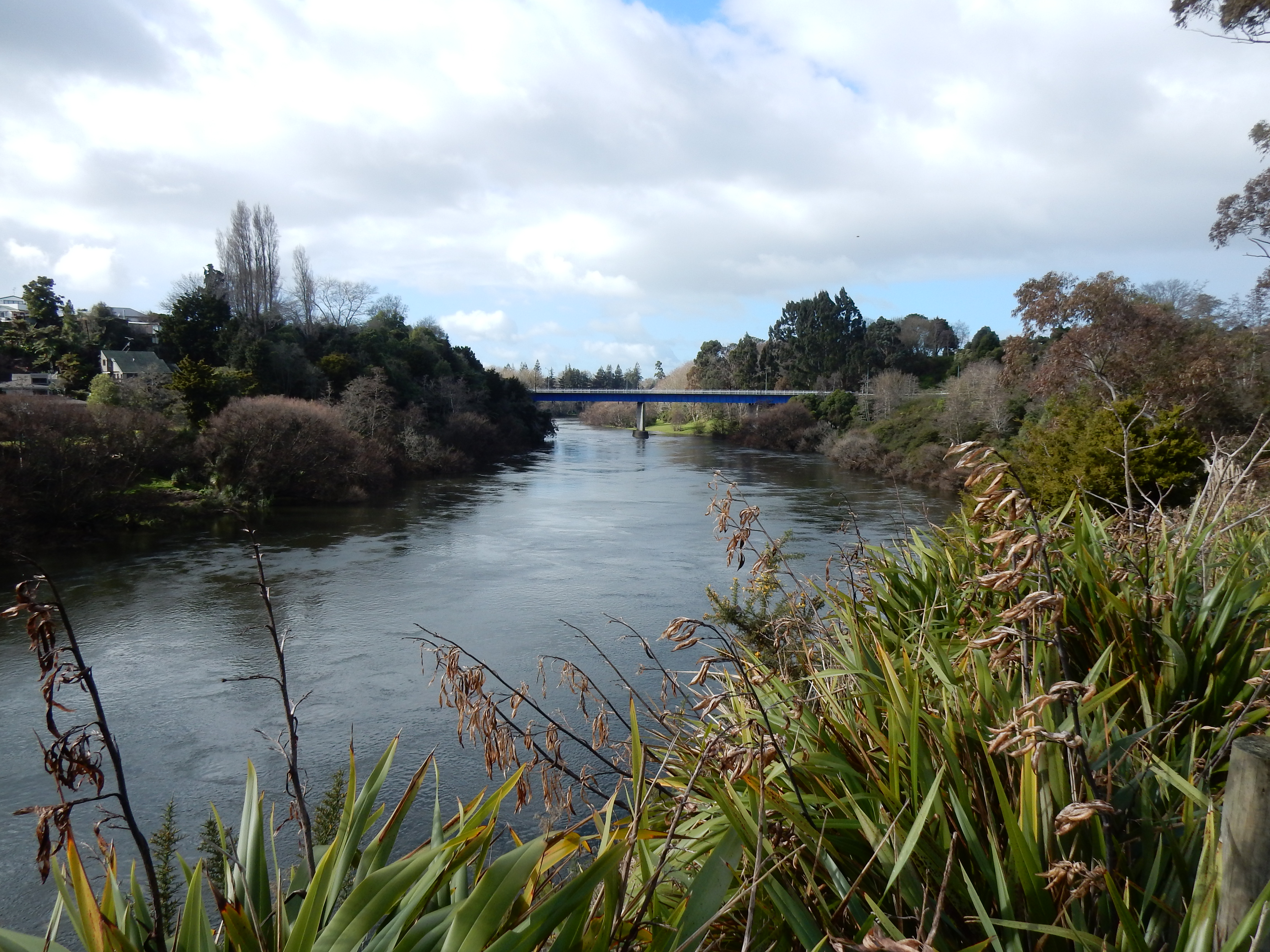
- Cobham Bridge in 2016 (after 2015 repaint)
- Coordinates: 37°48′20″S 175°17′42″E
- Carries: Motor vehicles, bicycles, pedestrians
- Crosses: Waikato River
- Owner: NZTA
- Preceded by: Peacocke Bridge
- Followed by: Victoria Bridge, Hamilton

Characteristics
- Total length: 143.3m
- Width: 9.14m
- No. of spans: four – 33.5m, 39.6m, 30.5m

History
- Opened: 1963

Statistics
- Daily traffic: ADT; 2000 24,435; 2005 26,800; 2010 27,606; 2015 29,000; 2020 33,300; 2021 29,000

Location
- Interactive map of Cobham Bridge

Cobham Bridge is a 143.3 m (470 ft) long girder bridge in Hamilton, New Zealand, on Cobham Drive, which is part of SH1C.

It spans the Waikato River. The Ministry of Works plaque at the southern end of the bridge says they designed it and it was opened on 29 June 1963. Its deck is 28 m (92 ft) above sea level. The river bed is 3.5 m (11 ft) above sea level.

Like the 1962 Cobham Bridge over the Whanganui River, it was opened when Lord Cobham was Governor General, though not opened by him. Mrs Adams-Schneider, Mayor Denis Rogers and Minister of Works, Stan Goosman, were at the opening.

== Gallery ==
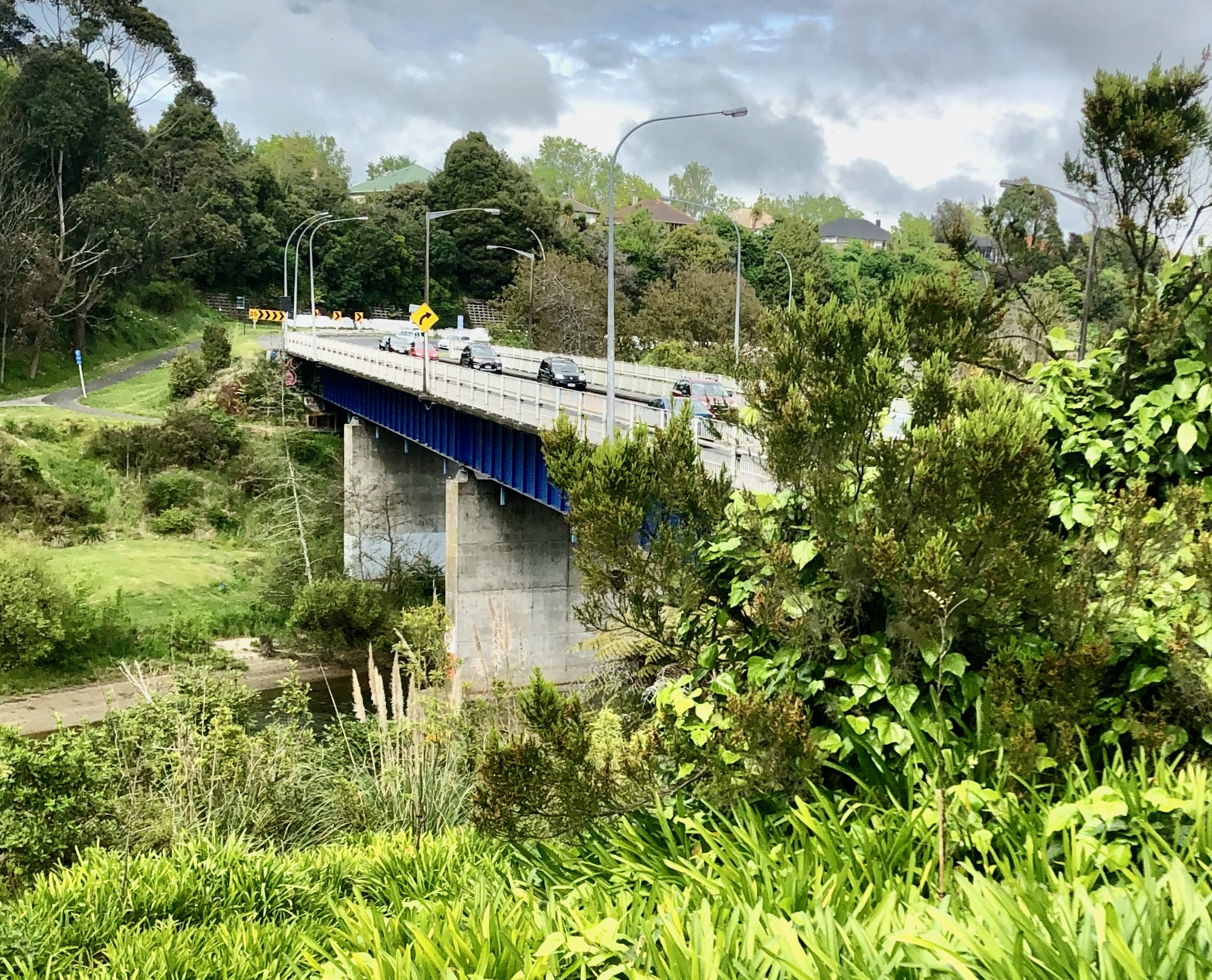
Cobham Bridge from north bank

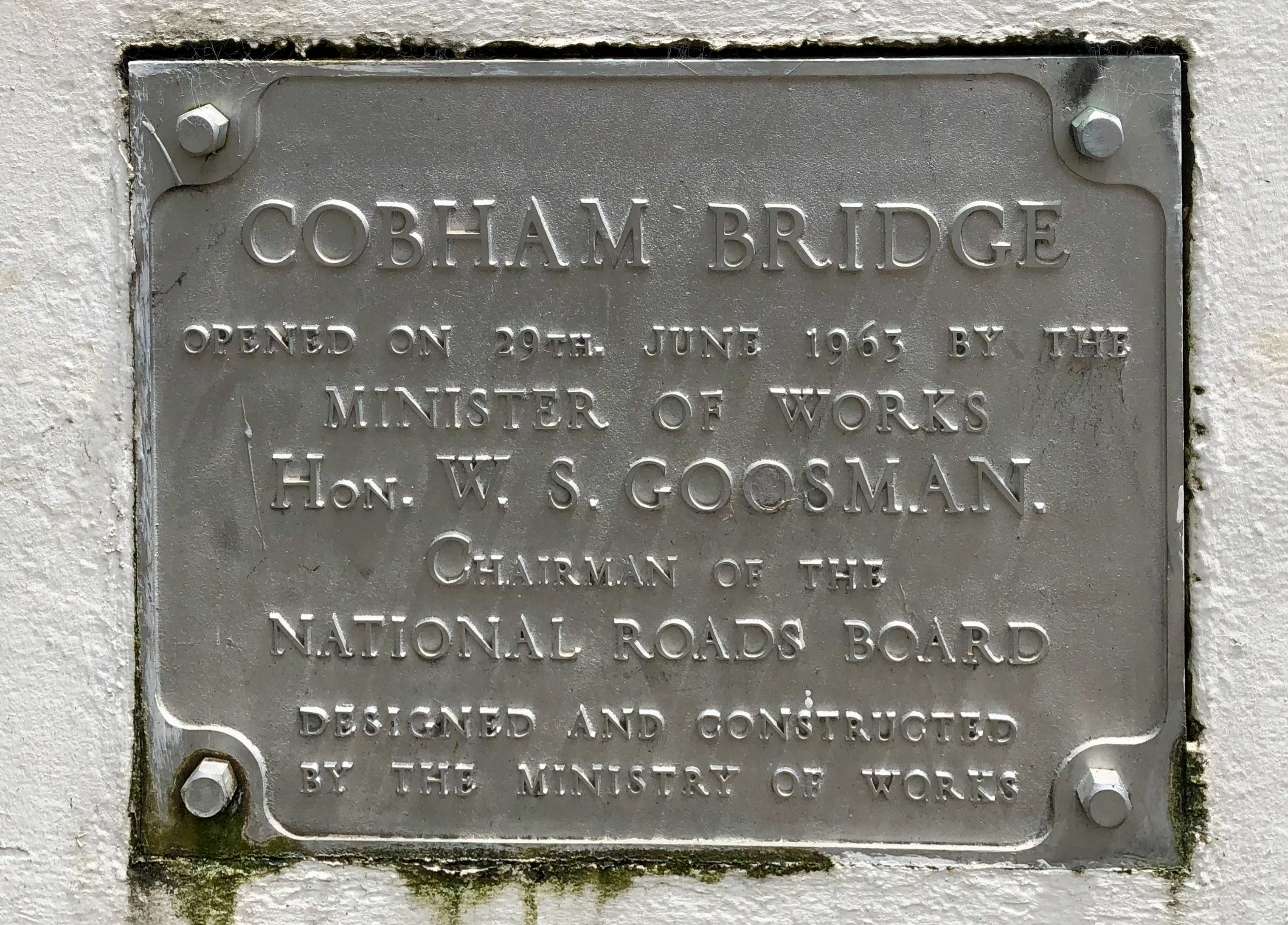
Cobham Bridge opening plaque

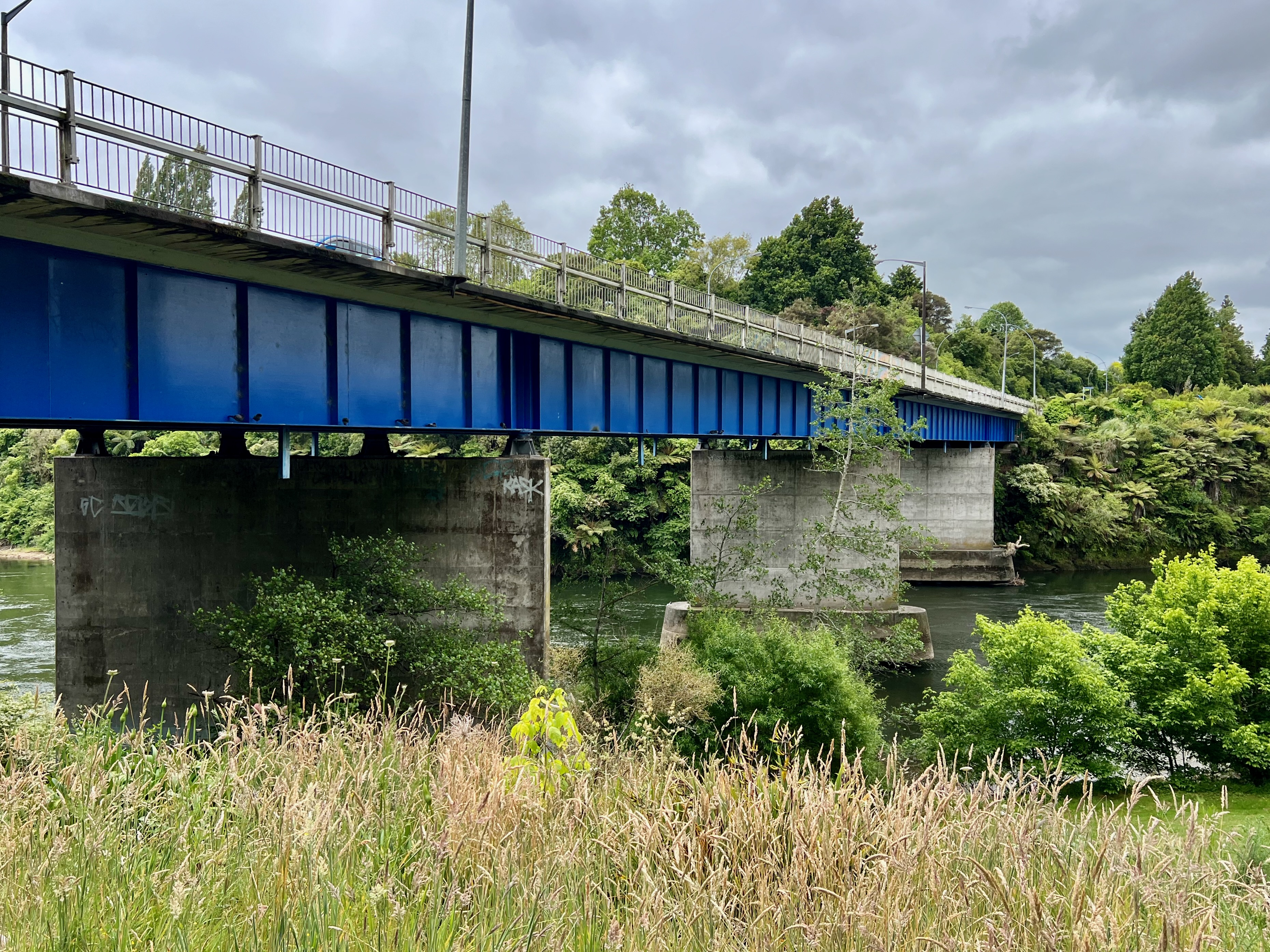
Bridge from south bank
