= Ramsey Harbour Swing Bridge =

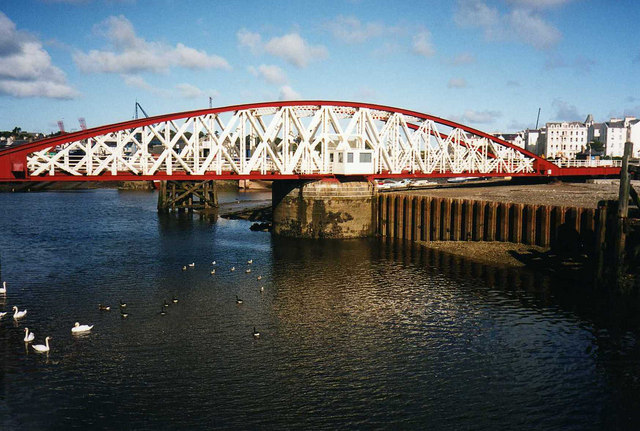
- Coordinates: 54°19′22″N 4°22′55″W
- Carries: Motor vehicles; Pedestrians
- Locale: Ramsey, Isle of Man,

Characteristics
- Design: Swing bridge
- Total length: 128 m (420 ft)
- Width: 4.6 m (15 ft)

History
- Opened: 29 June 1892

Location
- Interactive map of Ramsey Harbour Swing Bridge

The Ramsey Harbour Swing Bridge is located on the Isle of Man and links the town centre in Ramsey with the Mooragh Promenade.

== History ==
The bridge, which incorporates two steel trussed arches, was completed by Cleveland Bridge & Engineering Company in 1892. The bridge was refurbished in Winter 2013.
