= Cleveland Bridge & Engineering Company =

British bridge works and structural steel contractor

- Industry: Construction
- Founded: 1877
- Defunct: September 2021
- Headquarters: Darlington
- Products: Bridges; Structural steelwork

Cleveland Bridge & Engineering Company was a British bridge works and structural steel contractor based in Darlington.

It built various structures including the Victoria Falls Bridge, Tees Transporter Bridge, Forth Road, Humber Bridge and Tsing Ma Bridge.

In 1967, the company was acquired by The Cementation Company, which was then bought by Trafalgar House. In 1990, it merged with Redpath Dorman Long, another Trafalgar subsidiary, to create Cleveland Structural Engineering. In 2000, it was bought by management backed by Saudi Arabian interests. However, legal disputes on projects such as The Shard and Wembley Stadium pushed the Darlington business into administration and the business closed in 2021.

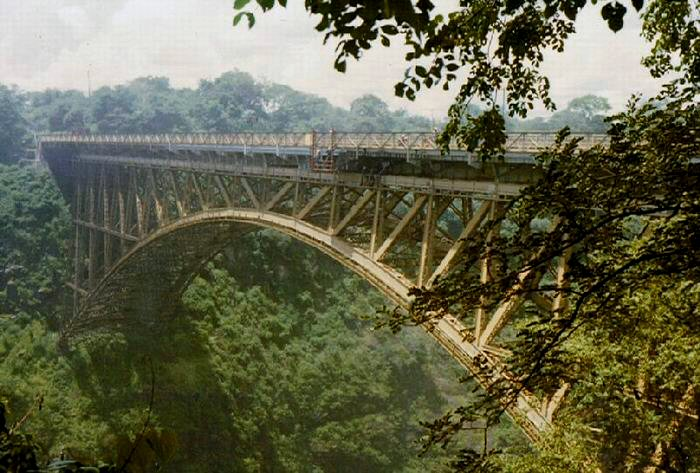
Victoria Falls Bridge

== History ==
Cleveland Bridge & Engineering Company was founded in 1877 in Darlington with a capital of £10,000. Seven years later, the assets were sold to Charles Frederick Dixon, who registered the company on a Stock Exchange in 1893. By 1913, it had 600 employees.

During 1967, the company was acquired by The Cementation Company. Three years later, Trafalgar House purchased Cementation; it also acquired Redpath Dorman Long from Dorman Long Group in 1982, after which the two subsidiaries were merged in 1990 to create Cleveland Structural Engineering. That business was renamed Kvaerner Cleveland Bridge following acquisition of Trafalgar House by Kværner in 1996.

During 1999, it was reported that Kværner intended to sell the business amid a wider restructuring away from heavy manufacturing activities; at the time, the company employed roughly 600 staff following a series of job losses. Despite appeals for financial assistance being made to the British government, it refused to intervene in the matter. One year later, the company became independent through a management buyout that involved a payment of $12.3 million. In addition to the UK-based operations, the same management team also acquired the company's Dubai subsidiary that had been established in 1978. Saudi Arabia's Al Rushaid Group provided finance to the firm which rose to an 88.5% stake by September 2002.

Throughout the 2000s and 2010s, the company's headcount varied considerably, often rising soon after the awarding of key contracts to the business. It undertook activities including road and railway schemes, and contributed to major construction projects such as The Shard and Wembley Stadium.

=== Final years ===
In July 2021, Cleveland Bridge sought further funding from Al Rushaid Group and warned 220 staff of potential redundancies. That same month, the firm was reported to be on the brink of administration as a result of contract delays and negative economic consequences that were partially attributable to COVID-19.

Al Rushaid Group did not provide the requested resources; instead, FRP was appointed as the company's administrator and the business was put up for sale. Consequently, 51 workers were made redundant in August 2021. Around 25 staff continued to assist FRP, and 128 staff were furloughed under the Coronavirus Jobs Retention Scheme pending restart of production.

FRP was ultimately unable to secure a buyer for the business. Accordingly, on 10 September 2021, it announced the company would permanently close with the loss of a further 133 jobs. FRP stated £12m would be required to fund the business to the end of 2021. The company assets were sold off in November 2021.

== Controversies ==
=== 2016 death and HSE fine ===
In 2022, Cleveland Bridge & Engineering was fined £1.5 million by the Health and Safety Executive, with a further cost judgement of £29,000 against them. An inadequately secured crane access panel gave way in a 2016 fatal fall. The fine related to four breaches of the Health and Safety at Work etc. Act 1974 leading to the death. FRP stated it was unlikely the fine or costs could be paid.

=== The Shard ===
In 2013, Cleveland Bridge was ordered to pay Severfield-Rowen plc £824,478 compensation for delays to their subcontracted work on The Shard. The judge accepted there was a very high incidence of poor workmanship in the steelwork Cleveland Bridge delivered. Cleveland Bridge's own internal correspondence highlighted an extraordinary work overload in 2010, and Judge Akenhead concluded it had taken on more work than it had capacity.

=== Wembley Stadium ===
In 2002, the company won a £60 million steelwork contract for the bowl of New Wembley Stadium. Part way through construction, relationships between main contractor Multiplex and Cleveland Bridge broke down. Multiplex stripped Cleveland Bridge of their erection role, handing it to roof steelwork contractor Hollandia. Two hundred of Cleveland Bridge's on site erection staff and subcontractors transferred to Hollandia and were sacked after going on strike. The situation escalated when Cleveland Bridge unilaterally repudiated its remaining stadium fabrication contract.

Both sides blamed each other for extra costs; delays; poor workmanship; missing or incorrect steelwork; damaged, missing or incorrect paintwork; chaotic record-keeping; and state of the near site stock yards. Litigation ensued and Cleveland Bridge was ultimately ordered to pay Multiplex £6,154,246.79 in respect of net earlier overpayments; breach of contract, and interest. Cleveland Bridge was also ordered to pay 20% of Multiplex's legal costs. It was claimed, in evidence, that some Wembley steelwork had been fabricated in China for Cleveland Bridge and that it had been diverted to the Beijing National Stadium.

Mr Justice Jackson's 2008 judgement in the Technology and Construction Court was highly critical of both parties unwillingness to settle earlier in such an expensive case where the core evidence extended to over 500 lever arch files, and photocopying costs alone were £1 million. He highlighted the large number of items at dispute where the sums involved were substantially exceeded by the legal costs involved in resolving them.

== Notable bridges ==
Bridge	Location	Year	Total length		Image	Ref
Bridge	Location	Year	ft	m	Image	Ref
Ramsey Harbour Swing Bridge	Isle of Man	1892	420	130		
Victoria Falls Bridge	Zimbabwe	1905	650	200		
Waibadu / Garden Bridge	Shanghai	1906	344	105		
King Edward VII Bridge	Newcastle	1906	1,151	351		
Blue Nile Road and Railway Bridge	Sudan	1909	1,837	560		
Victoria Bridge	Hamilton	1910	500	150		
Tees Transporter Bridge	Middlesbrough	1911	851	259		
Goz Abu Goma Bridge	Sudan	1911	1,759	536		
Trent Bridge widening	Nottingham	1926	300	91		
Chiswick Bridge	London	1933	606	185		
Verrugas Bridge	Peru	1936	574	175		
Howrah Bridge	India	1942	2,313	705		
Spit Bridge	Sydney	1958	745	227		
Auckland Harbour Bridge	Auckland	1959	3,350	1,020		
Tamar Bridge	Saltash – Plymouth	1959	1,099	335		
Forth Road Bridge (ACD)	Scotland	1964	8,241	2,512		
Severn Bridge (ABB)	UK	1966	5,249	1,600		
Wye Bridge	UK	1968	1,340	410		
Bosphorus Bridge	Turkey	1973	1,560	480		
Rio–Niterói Bridge	Brazil	1974	43,602	13,290		
Ballachulish Bridge	Scotland	1974	964	294		
Humber Bridge	Hessle	1981	7,300	2,200		
Kessock Bridge	Inverness	1982	3,465	1,056		
Queen Elizabeth II Bridge	London	1991	9,423	2,872		
Tsing Ma Bridge	Hong Kong	1997	4,518	1,377		
Jiangyin Yangtze River Bridge	Jiangsu	1999	4,544	1,385		
New Carquinez Bridge	Vallejo	2003	3,465	1,056		
Rio–Antirrio Bridge	Gulf of Corinth	2004	9,450	2,880		
Infinity Bridge	Stockton on Tees	2009	787	240		
Twin Sails Bridge	Poole	2012	456	139		

== See also ==
- British Constructional Steelwork Association
- Severfield
- William Hare Group
- Dorman Long
- Rowecord Engineering
