= Goz Abu Goma Bridge =

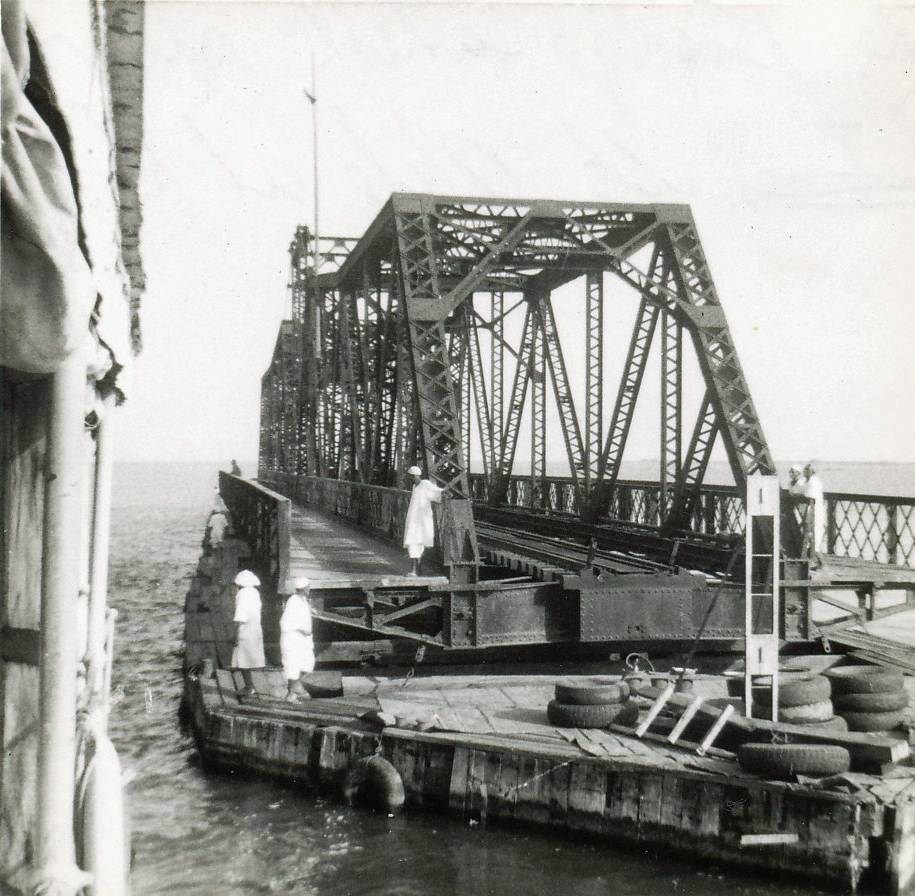
- Goz Abu Goma Bridge in 1967
- Coordinates: 13°08′38″N 32°43′40″E
- Carries: Railway
- Crosses: White Nile
- Locale: Sudan

Characteristics
- Total length: 536 m

History
- Constructed by: Cleveland Bridge & Engineering Company
- Opened: 1911

Location
- Interactive map of Goz Abu Goma Bridge

The Goz Abu Goma Bridge is a railway bridge across the White Nile at Kosti, the former Goz Abu Goma. It is 50 miles south of Alays in Sudan and is located on the railway line between Khartoum and Al-Ubayyid.

There are nine main river openings, with a total span of 536 metres (1,759 ft) long.

The bridge was completed by Cleveland Bridge & Engineering Company in 1911.
