= Victoria Bridge, Hamilton =

Victoria Bridge
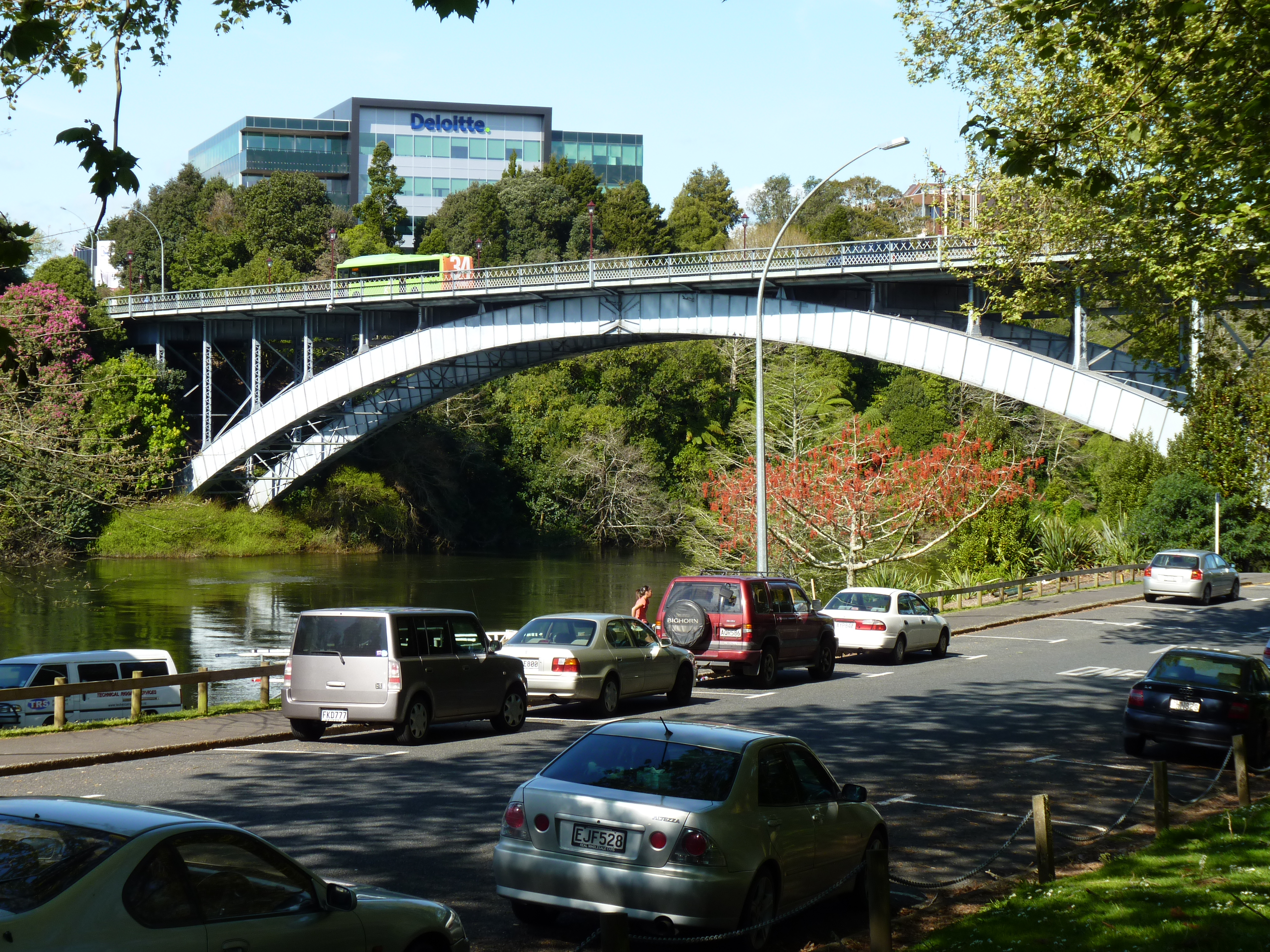
- Coordinates: 37°47′29″S 175°17′23″E
- Carries: Motor vehicles, bicycles, pedestrians
- Crosses: Waikato River
- Other name: Hamilton Traffic Bridge
- Owner: Hamilton City Council
- Preceded by: Cobham Bridge
- Followed by: Claudelands Bridge

Characteristics
- Longest span: 103.6 m
- No. of spans: three
- Piers in water: nil

History
- Designer: James Fulton
- Constructed by: G M Fraser
- Construction start: 1909
- Opened: 9 September 1910

Statistics
- Daily traffic: 2-way traffic counts 92m east of Victoria St; 2004 28,585; 2005 29,050; 2010 26,300; 2015 25,400; 2020 25,500; 2021 25,600; 2022 25,700; 2023 25,800

Location
- Interactive map of Victoria Bridge

Victoria Bridge (originally known as the Hamilton Traffic Bridge and later also as The Bridge Street Bridge) is a steel arch bridge in Hamilton, New Zealand, connecting the suburbs of Hamilton Central and Hamilton East. The bridge has a Category I heritage protection.

The bridge was designed by James Fulton, and G M Fraser was the contractor. Work erecting the bridge, which was pre-fabricated in England by the Cleveland Bridge & Engineering Company, started in 1909. The bridge has a main arch of 340 ft (100 m) and 4 land spans. Its total length is 500 ft (150 m). The road is 18 ft (5.5 m) wide and the footpath 4.5 ft (1.4 m). It cost £25,500, equivalent to over $4m in 2017. It replaced the 1879 timber Union Bridge.

In 1929 stone steps were built beside the western end of the bridge to link to Ferry Bank.

== Union bridge 1879-1910 ==
From 1864 a punt linked East and West Hamilton. It suffered many problems and in April 1878 ratepayers approved a £7,000 loan to build a Traffic Bridge by 107 votes to 6.

William Corlass Breakell (1845-1923) designed the bridge, which had 3 main piers on 30 ft (9.1 m) long, 12 in (300 mm) x 12 in (300 mm) totara piles, supporting 3 x 100 ft (30 m) main spans over the river, in addition to which there were 10 x 40 ft (12 m) spans over lower ground. The main spans were on 32 ft (9.8 m) high trestles, with 36 ft (11 m) bases, tapering to 19 ft (5.8 m), built of 12 in (300 mm) x 12 in (300 mm) kauri. The piers were 20 ft (6.1 m) above the piles, sheathed in 2 in (51 mm) planking. The height from normal water level to the floor of the bridge was 52 ft (16 m), allowing steamers beyond the bridge. On the east a 52 ft (16 m) x 18 ft (5.5 m) x 8 ft (2.4 m) feet concrete pier was at the junction of the main spans, and the land spans. The bridge contract was signed on 23 August by Auckland contractors, Ross and Dunbar, for £7,115, or £7,145. The first pile was driven in December 1878 though it was found the silt was too soft and more piles were needed. The Hamilton East approach was dug up to 20 ft (6.1 m) deep from the Waikato Hotel and the fill used to build the Bridge Street approach 1.5 ch (30 m) wide.

The bridge was opened on 27 November 1879, by the mayor's wife, Mrs John Blair Whyte. Tolls were charged at the same rate as the punt it replaced, until in 1882 the government agreed to provide money to end the toll, which was abolished in 1883.

== Names ==
=== Roads ===
The road that goes over the bridge has changed names several times. Up until 1930, the road was known as Richmond Street. A commemorative plaque refers to it as Hamilton Road, though. The name changed to Bridge Street. The latest name change happened in November 2015, when the road was officially renamed as Anzac Parade.

=== Bridges ===
Similarly the bridges have had several names. When Union bridge opened, the mayor's wife was expected to call it Victoria Bridge, though this may have been reported in error. After breaking a bottle of champagne, Mrs John Blair Whyte named it the Union Bridge, as it united the east and west. It was often called Hamilton Traffic Bridge, and sometimes Town Bridge, but in 1881 a court was told it was Victoria Bridge and not Hamilton cart bridge. A 1920 photograph captioned it Victoria Bridge. A 1970 report called it Victoria traffic bridge. It is now called Victoria Bridge by the city council and has that name on Google maps, but LINZ Basemaps only show Anzac Parade.

== 1910 Replacement ==
By 1880 there were reports of the bridge swaying. A 1900 report found the piles and arches were largely sound, but the studs, struts, braces, puriri corbels and headstocks were decayed. It concluded replacement would be cheaper than repair. In 1908 it was agreed that a replacement bridge would be funded 65% by Hamilton Borough, 25% by Waikato County and 5% each by Waipa County and Frankton Town Board. The new traffic bridge was built alongside, just to the north of the old bridge. There was no formal opening, but on 9 September 1910 the engineer and a local priest were the first to drive across the new Hamilton Traffic Bridge.

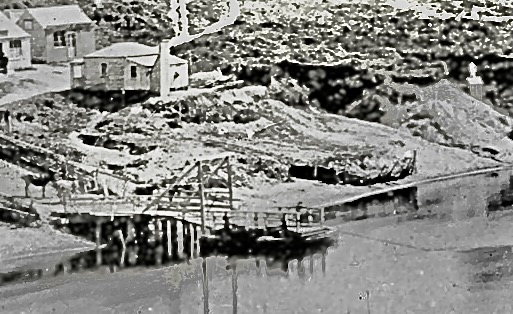
Punt at Hamilton West

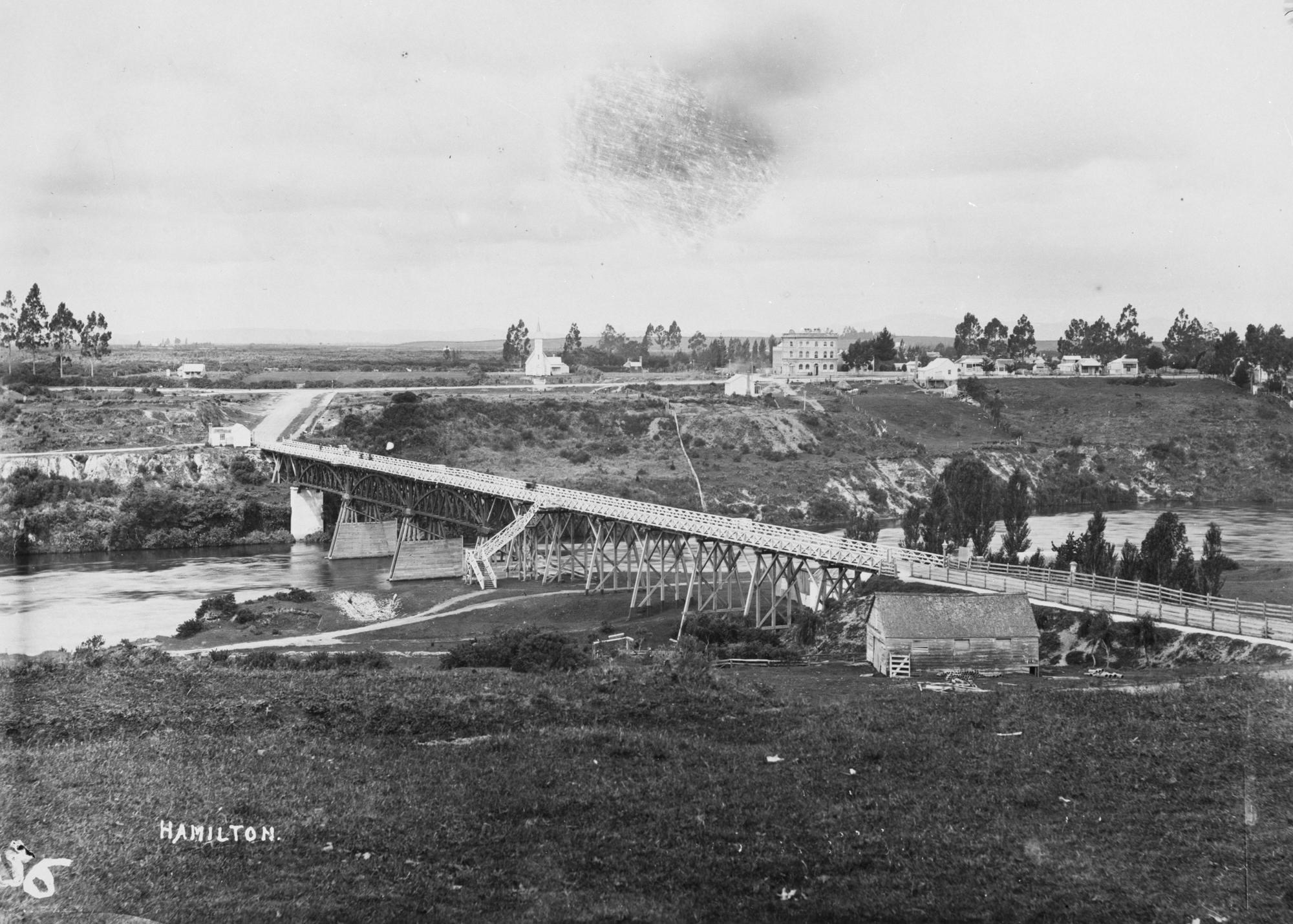
Traffic Bridge in 1883

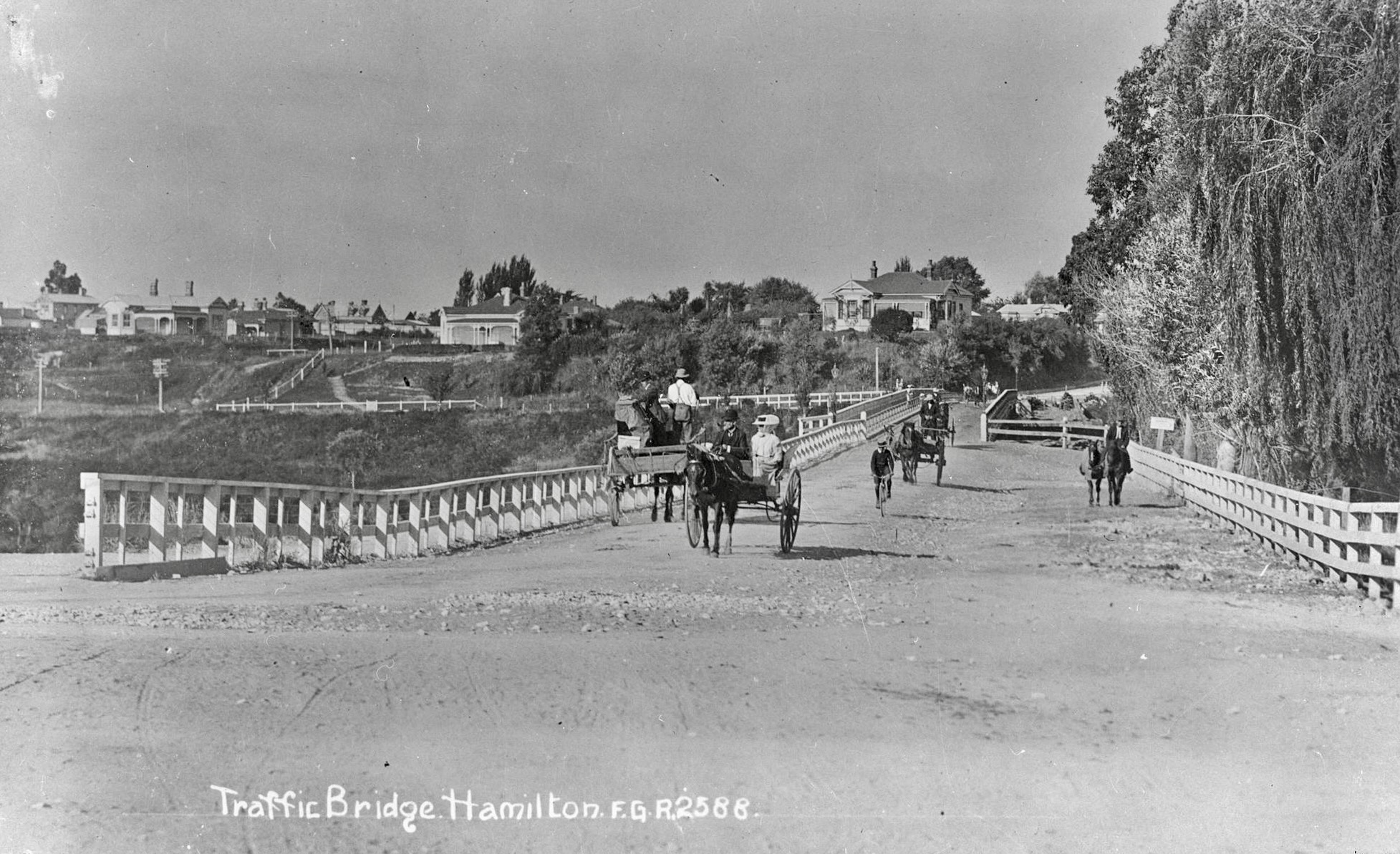
Traffic Bridge, with bicycle and horses

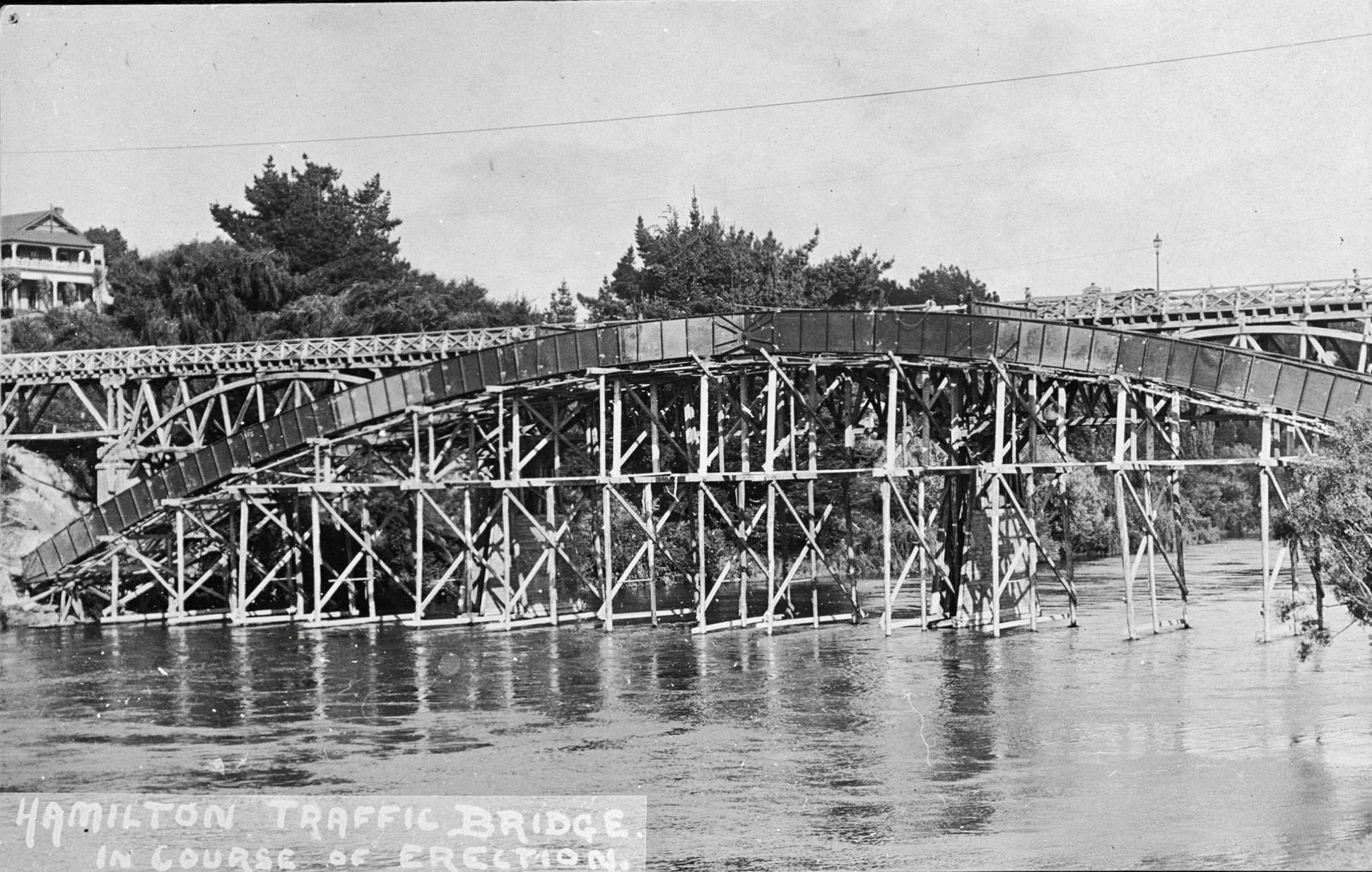
Victoria and Union bridges in 1909

== Repairs ==
The reinforced concrete deck was designed to carry trams. In 1919, the western king posts needed strengthening. A decade later, the foundations had spread 6 in (150 mm) and the crown of the arch had dropped 12.5 in (320 mm). Over the next 3 years the foundations spread up to a further 3/8 in (9.5 mm) and the crown settled up to another inch. Also the deck reinforcing was very corroded. 6.5-long-ton (6.6 t) and 10 mph (16 km/h) limits were imposed. It was repaired and jacked up in 1937, when a lighter, steel-framed deck was installed. That was removed when the road was widened in 1992-1993, over the original footway, and a pedestrian walkway was cantilevered at the side.

== Heritage registration ==
On 30 August 1990, the bridge was registered as a Category I 'Historic Place' with the New Zealand Historic Places Trust (now known as Heritage New Zealand).

== Present day ==
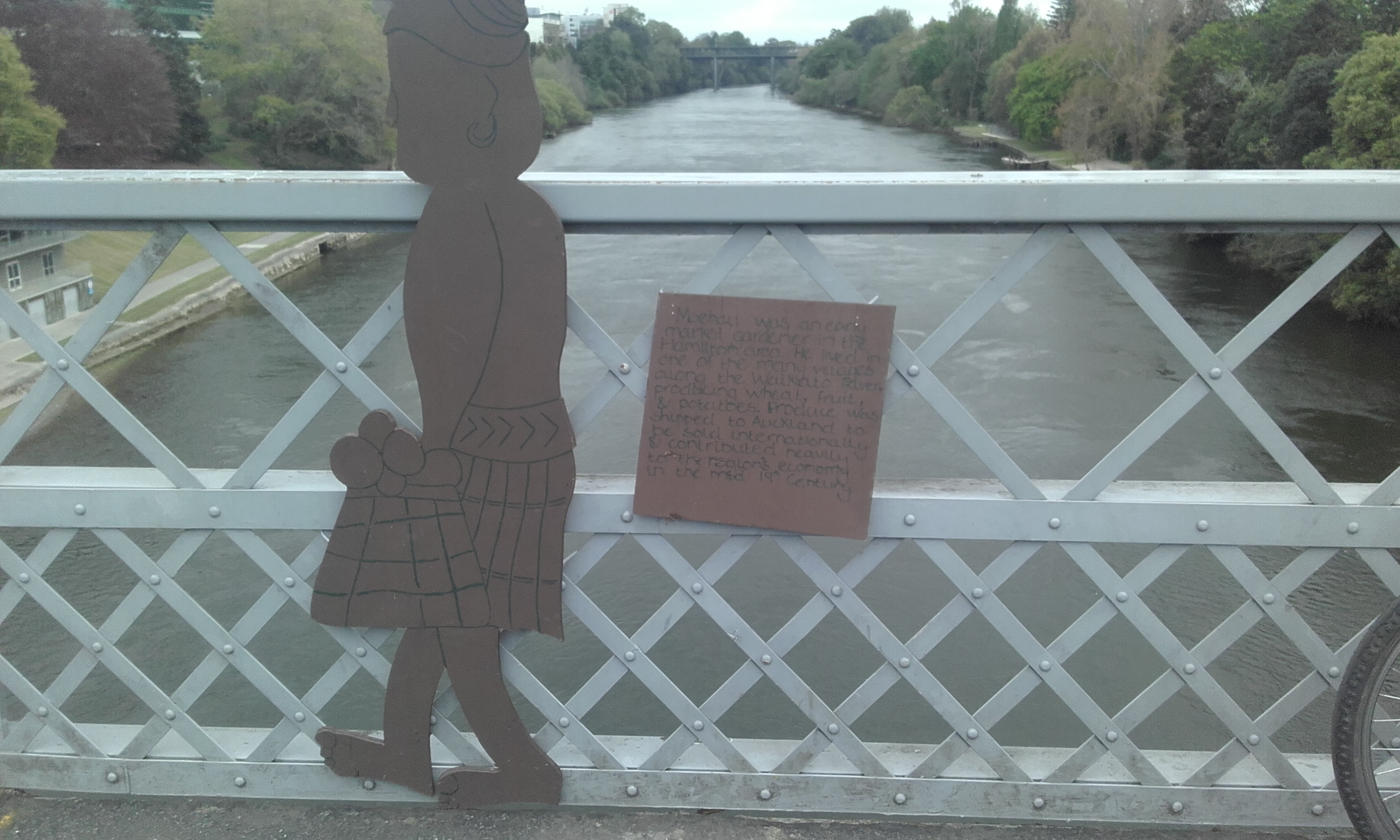
Maori protest figure

In 2010, the bridge celebrated its 100th year with a party in the park and unveiled a permanent interactive LED lighting system designed to illuminate the bridge for 10–15 years. This project was funded via a donation from the Perry Foundation. The party in the park featured a parade containing people in period costume and classic cars and rides and events for children. The event culminated in the display of a specially commissioned film projected onto a large screen next to the PS Rangiriri, Hamilton's historic paddle steamer in Hamilton East. At the end of the film, the light show was launched. The colour kinetics interactive lighting feature spans the entire structure and took seven days of rigging and many months of planning to install. The bridge is transformed into specific colours at certain times in order to welcome visiting sports teams and to celebrate national or local occasions; for example, the bridge was coloured red in a 2020 Covid event and green for Recycling Week in October 2025.

Bronze figures depicting local historical figures have been fixed to the railings since 2010 to celebrate Hamilton's early years and connection to the river. These have faced some controversy as they appear to favour colonial histories to the detriment of the rich indigenous cultural connection to the area, and are a subject of some protest. From time to time "balancing" figures appear, highlighting these apparently missing elements.
