= 2023 Kosti clashes =

- Part of Sudanese conflict in South Kordofan and Blue Nile
Date	May 7-12, 2023
Location	Kosti, White Nile State, Sudan
Result	Truce mediated

Belligerents
Nuba peoples	Fellata

Casualties and losses
Unknown	Unknown
- 29 killed 40+ injured

Between May 7 and 12, 2023, clashes broke out between Nuba and Hausa civilians in Kosti, White Nile State, Sudan, leaving 29 people dead and many more injured. The clashes were not related to the Sudanese civil war, which had started between the Sudanese government and Rapid Support Forces in Khartoum and other cities across the country three weeks prior.

== Background ==
Hausa communities that immigrated to what is now southern Sudan several centuries ago have been the target of community conflicts between indigenous Sudanese groups like Nuba peoples and Funj people for several decades. Disputes over local power and land rights, combined with government instability, sparked several waves of clashes in Blue Nile state between July 2022 and January 2023 that killed over 600 people. While these clashes didn't take place in White Nile, the ethnic rivalries were still present.

On April 15, 2023, after months of arming themselves and failed negotiations for a civilian government, the paramilitary Rapid Support Forces (RSF) led by Hemedti attempted to overthrew Sudanese junta leader Abdel Fattah al-Burhan, sparking clashes in every city in Sudan. Much of eastern and southern Sudan, including White Nile, had their RSF rebellions suppressed by the Sudanese army, and fighting was instead concentrated in Khartoum State and Darfur. However, 70% of internally displaced refugees from Khartoum State resided in White Nile following the clashes, many of whom were South Sudanese refugees. Combined with 17,000 Blue Nile refugees, in February 2023 the state's refugee population was 287,000, although the amount of refugees in Kosti in particular is unknown. The civil war's eruption inflamed pre-existing tribal conflicts across the nation.

== Conflict ==
The conflict started on May 7, when the theft of a telephone sparked a physical fight between several people. Fighting began on a large scale in the al-Nakhalat neighborhood of Kosti on May 8 between Nuba and West African "fellata" groups. A policeman in the city said that four men and one woman across both sides were killed. SUNA reported on May 9 that sixteen people had been killed on both sides and many more had been injured. Many houses were burnt as well, with videos circulating of mobs attacking and burning homes in the city. That night, the governor of White Nile declared a curfew. Three people were reported killed on May 9, with later reports adding that the May 7-8 death toll had increased to 25 killed.

By May 12, the conflict had subsided with local elders mediating a peace treaty with both sides. OCHA reported that 29 people had been killed and at least 40 injured in the clashes.
