= Peacocke, New Zealand =

Suburb of Hamilton, New Zealand

Peacocke
- Suburb
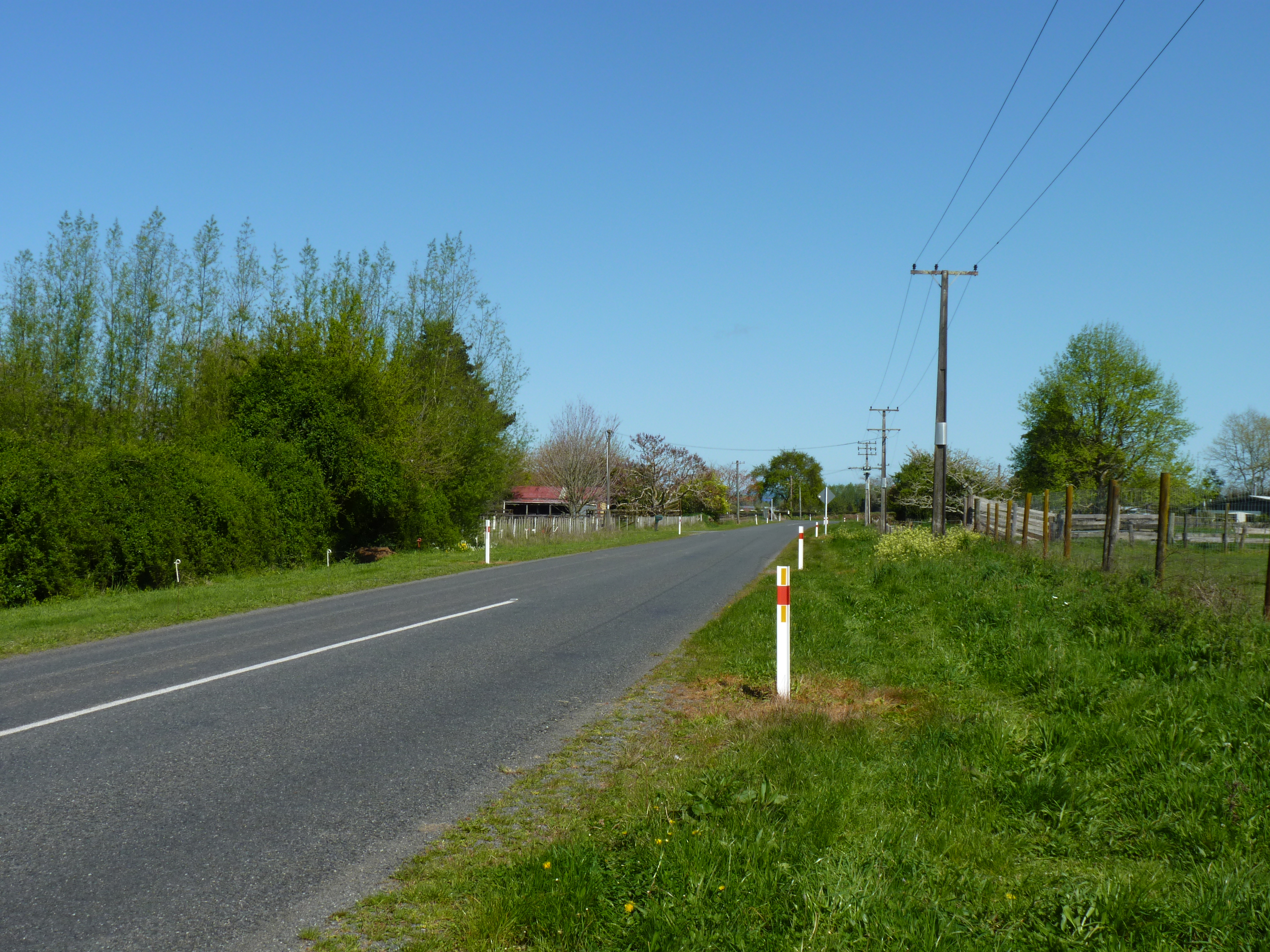
- Peacocke, Hamilton
- Interactive map of Peacocke
- Coordinates: 37°48′44.13″S 175°18′43.56″E
- Country: New Zealand
- City: Hamilton, New Zealand
- Local authority: Hamilton City Council
- Electoral ward: West Ward

Area
  - Land: 693 ha (1,710 acres)

Population (June 2025)
  - Total: 420
  - Density: 61/km^{2} (160/sq mi)

	Hillcrest	Riverlea
Fitzroy	Peacocke
	Rukuhia	Tamahere

Peacocke is a semi-rural suburb in southern Hamilton in New Zealand. Peacocke was brought into the city boundaries in 1989. It is one of the future urban zones of Hamilton, along with Rotokauri.

== Development ==
The Peacocke Structure Plan of 2007 provided for development on 620 ha (1,500 acres) over about 25 years. Two consent applications were made in 2018 proposing an 'Amberfield' development of 862 sections on 105 ha (260 acres) between Peacockes Rd and the Waikato River. By 2020 the granting of the consent had been appealed to the Environment Court, a major issue being protection of habitats for endangered long tailed bats. An August 2023 council meeting had a report that the area will provide up to 7,400 homes for up to 20,000 people by 2070 and that 405 sections were in progress, 1303 sections had subdivision consent, 91 homes had building consent and 334 were ready. As well as Amberfield, 650 homes are planned at Aurora, 230 at Qestral retirement village, 39 at Corbourneview and 71 at Saxbys. A 14 ha (35 acres) Adare block and .5 ha (1.2 acres) Koppen’s block will form a sports park. The Peacocke bridge and sewage projects were set back by Cyclone Gabrielle and other storms, delaying completion until August 2024. The 2023 report also said a north-south wastewater pipeline and shared pathway were being built, including 2 gully bridges over the Mangakootukutuku Stream, and that Whatukooruru Drive will link Hall Road with Ohaupo Road (SH3).

== History ==
Nukuhau Pā is one of the best preserved pā sites on the Waikato. It is at the south end of Peacocke, beside the river. Ngāti Mahuta may have been occupied it around 1700, after which Ngati Raukawa conquered it, or it may have belonged to Ngāti Ruru and been taken back by Ngāti Māhanga. It was reported as abandoned about 1830, at the time of the musket wars. After the 1863 invasion of the Waikato it was confiscated.

The land was acquired in 1868 by Colonel de Quincy, who named it “Weston Lea” after his grandmother’s English home, near Bath. In 1887, Fitzroy Peacocke, a son of Captain Peacocke, bought the land from the Colonel, who was step-father of his wife, Florence Henrietta. However, they didn't move there until 1889 and the farm was for sale 3 years later. Their son, Egerton Peacocke, took on the farm in 1905 and cleared much of the bush to form a dairy farm. His brother Noel, an architect, designed a new homestead, built in 1912.

== Demographics ==
The statistical area, which was called Peacockes for the 2018 Census and renamed Peacocke for 2023, covers 6.93 km^{2} (2.68 sq mi) and had an estimated population of 420 as of June 2025, with a population density of 61 people per km^{2}.

Historical population
Year	Pop.	±% p.a.
2006	291	—
2013	327	+1.68%
2018	348	+1.25%
2023	369	+1.18%

Peacocke had a population of 369 in the 2023 New Zealand census, an increase of 21 people (6.0%) since the 2018 census, and an increase of 42 people (12.8%) since the 2013 census. There were 180 males and 186 females in 123 dwellings. 3.3% of people identified as LGBTIQ+. The median age was 42.6 years (compared with 38.1 years nationally). There were 75 people (20.3%) aged under 15 years, 60 (16.3%) aged 15 to 29, 165 (44.7%) aged 30 to 64, and 69 (18.7%) aged 65 or older.

People could identify as more than one ethnicity. The results were 78.0% European (Pākehā); 22.0% Māori; 4.1% Pasifika; 13.8% Asian; 0.8% Middle Eastern, Latin American and African New Zealanders (MELAA); and 0.8% other, which includes people giving their ethnicity as "New Zealander". English was spoken by 97.6%, Māori language by 4.1%, Samoan by 0.8%, and other languages by 13.8%. No language could be spoken by 3.3% (e.g. too young to talk). New Zealand Sign Language was known by 0.8%. The percentage of people born overseas was 21.1, compared with 28.8% nationally.

Religious affiliations were 34.1% Christian, 1.6% Hindu, 1.6% Islam, 0.8% Māori religious beliefs, and 0.8% other religions. People who answered that they had no religion were 56.9%, and 4.1% of people did not answer the census question.

Of those at least 15 years old, 99 (33.7%) people had a bachelor's or higher degree, 141 (48.0%) had a post-high school certificate or diploma, and 57 (19.4%) people exclusively held high school qualifications. The median income was $53,000, compared with $41,500 nationally. 63 people (21.4%) earned over $100,000 compared to 12.1% nationally. The employment status of those at least 15 was that 147 (50.0%) people were employed full-time, 27 (9.2%) were part-time, and 6 (2.0%) were unemployed.

== See also ==
- Suburbs of Hamilton, New Zealand
