= Banking in Sudan =

Banking in Sudan covers the history, development and structure of banking in the Sudan. From the inheritance of the banking system from the Anglo-Egyptian Sudan to the establishment of the Sudan central bank in 1959 and development of Islamic banking in the mid 1970s.

As of 2012, Sudan had 23 commercial banks. The creation of the new sovereign country of South Sudan in 2011 saw the central bank branch in Juba become the separate Bank of South Sudan.

== History ==
Sudan inherited its banking system from the Anglo-Egyptian Condominium (1899-1955). When the National Bank of Egypt opened in Khartoum in 1901, it obtained a privileged position as banker to and for the government, being a semiofficial central bank. Other banks followed, but the National Bank of Egypt and Barclays Bank in Britain dominated and stabilized banking in Sudan until after World War II. Postwar prosperity created a demand for an increasing number of commercial banks.

Before Sudanese independence, there were no restrictions on the movement of funds between Egypt and Sudan, and the value of the currency used in Sudan was tied to that of Egypt. This situation was unsatisfactory to an independent Sudan, which established the Sudan Currency Board to replace Egyptian currency. It was not a central bank because it did not accept deposits, loan money, or provide commercial banks with cash and liquidity.

A three-member commission from the U.S. Federal Reserve System, established in 1956, provided recommendations for establishing a central bank in Sudan. In 1959 the Bank of Sudan succeeded the Sudan Currency Board, taking over the Sudanese assets of the National Bank of Egypt, and acting as the central bank of Sudan, issuing currency, assisting the development of banks, providing loans, maintaining financial equilibrium, and advising the government.

The Bank of Sudan used policy instruments, including interest-rate policies, to control the quantity of money in circulation from its establishment until 1984, when Islamic laws were introduced. After the complete Islamization of the banking system in 1992, the Bank of Sudan eliminated treasury bills and government bonds that carried interest rates. In their place, the bank issued financial certificates conforming to the Islamic system. To ensure that banking operations would be free of practices that might be deemed usurious, the Sharia High Supervisory Board became a part of the Bank in 1993.

Among the measures introduced by the 1997 IMF economic reform program was a system of Islamic open-market operations, with central bank short-term and long-term profit-sharing certificates sold at weekly auctions to control liquidity. The central bank also began to require commercial banks to comply more closely with minimum reserve requirements and established a discount window for short-term bank credit that increased the impact of the interest-rate policy. The bank abolished the extension of low-cost credit to the central government and state-owned institutions.

There were originally five major commercial banks (Bank of Khartoum, An-Nilein Bank, Sudan Commercial Bank, the People’s Cooperative Bank, and the Unity Bank), but the number subsequently grew. In 1970 the banks were nationalized and became controlled by the Bank of Sudan. As of 2003, however, there were once again private- as well as public-sector banks.

To encourage foreign capital investment, in 1974 foreign banks were urged to establish joint ventures in association with Sudanese capital. Banking transactions with foreign companies operating in Sudan were facilitated so long as they abided by the rulings of the Bank of Sudan and transferred a minimum of £s.3 million into Sudan. Several foreign banks took advantage of this “open-door” policy, most notably Citibank, the Faisal Islamic Bank, Chase Manhattan Bank, and the Arab Authority for Agricultural Investment and Development. In early 2011, two foreign banks had branches in Sudan, Abu Dhabi National Bank and Estates Commercial Bank.

In 2010 the Bank of Sudan had 14 branches, including the Bank of South Sudan, which remained a branch and continued to render conventional (non-Islamized) banking services within a dual banking system. There also were 23 commercial banks. In addition to commercial banks, the government also established numerous specialized banks. They included the Agricultural Bank, the Savings & Social Development Bank (owned by the public sector), and the Financial Investment Bank (owned by the private sector). The commercial and other specialized banks had 535 branches throughout the country.

The banking system had worked effectively until the late 1970s and 1980s, when the decline in foreign trade, balance-of-payments problems, spiraling external debt, increased corruption, and the introduction of Islamic banking disrupted the financial system. Some reforms were introduced in the IMF economic adjustment program, but further reform of the system was an important consideration while developing the January 2005 Comprehensive Peace Agreement to end the civil war in Sudan. One of the decisions at that time was that Sudan would have a dual banking system. As a result, the North retained an Islamic banking system, whereas the South adopted interest-based banking. In 2005 the GOSS created a central bank, the Bank of South Sudan, which functioned as a branch of the Bank of Sudan and shared its monetary policies. Several foreign banks established branches in Juba.

== Islamic Banking ==
The Faisal Islamic Bank, whose principal patron was the Saudi prince, Muhammad ibn Faisal al-Saud, was established in 1977. The open-door policy enabled Saudi Arabia, which had a huge surplus after the 1973 OPEC increases in the price of petroleum, to invest in Sudan. Members of the Muslim Brotherhood and its political arm, the National Islamic Front, play a prominent role on the bank’s board of directors. It was the first sharia-based bank to open a branch in Khartoum. Other Islamic banks followed. As a consequence, both the Ansar and Khatmiyyah religious groups and their political parties, the Umma and the Democratic Unionist Party, formed their own Islamic banks. At the time, both Islamic and conventional banking systems operated together. However, the Faisal Islamic Bank enjoyed certain privileges denied other commercial banks (full tax exemption on assets, profits, wages, and pensions) as well as guarantees against confiscation or nationalization.

Al-Salam Bank’s Sudan affiliate and Emirates and Sudan Bank (ESB), established in 2006, were the two newest foreign banks in early 2011. Al-Salam Bank Sudan was founded by a consortium of United Arab Emirates (UAE) and Sudanese investors. The Emirates and Sudan Bank was established as a result of the acquisition of 60 percent of the Bank of Khartoum by Dubai Islamic Bank (DIB). The government of Sudan had previously owned 99 percent of Bank of Khartoum, Sudan's first bank, dating from 1913. Both Al-Salam Bank Sudan and Emirates and Sudan Bank claimed to be the largest banks in Sudan, with operations fully sharia compliant. Both banks intended to open branches throughout the country to support development, including rebuilding the southern areas of Sudan as well as other areas affected by the civil war.

By 1992 the Bank of Sudan eliminated treasury bills and government bonds, instruments on which interest was paid, and substituted financial certificates conforming to the Islamic system. The central bank continued to be the bank for the central and regional governments and for semigovemmental institutions. It also served as the lender to the government and lender of last resort to the banks.

The theory of Islamic banking was derived from the Quran and the Prophet Muhammad's exhortations against exploitation and the unjust acquisition of wealth defined as riba, meaning interest or usury. Profit and trade were encouraged and provided the foundation for Islamic banking. The prohibitions against interest were founded on the Islamic concept of property as resulting either from an individual's creative labor or from exchange of goods or property. Interest on money loaned fell within neither of these two concepts and was thus unjustified.

To resolve this dilemma from a legal and religious point of view, Islamic banking employed common terms: musharakah, or partnership for production; mudharabah, or silent partnership when one party provides the capital, the other the labor; and murabbahah, or deferred payment on purchases, similar in practice to an overdraft and the most-favored Islamic banking arrangement in Sudan. To resolve the prohibition on interest, an interest-bearing overdraft would be changed to a murabbahah contract. The fundamental difference between Islamic and traditional banking systems is that in an Islamic system deposits are regarded as shares, hence their nominal value is not guaranteed.

There were many government-sponsored Islamic initiatives in Sudan, resisted by the predominantly Christian South. However, the Islamic banks were apparently successful there, too, and avoided the controversy of other Islamic initiatives. The sector experienced rapid growth, expected to accelerate with future economic reconstruction and increased production in Sudan's oil fields.
