= Rabak =

Capital city of the Sudanese state of White Nile

Rabak ربك
- City
- Location in Sudan
- Coordinates: 13°10′46″N 32°45′07″E
- Country: Sudan
- State: White Nile
- District: Rabak
- Elevation: 400 m (1,312 ft)
- Time zone: UTC+02:00 (CAT)

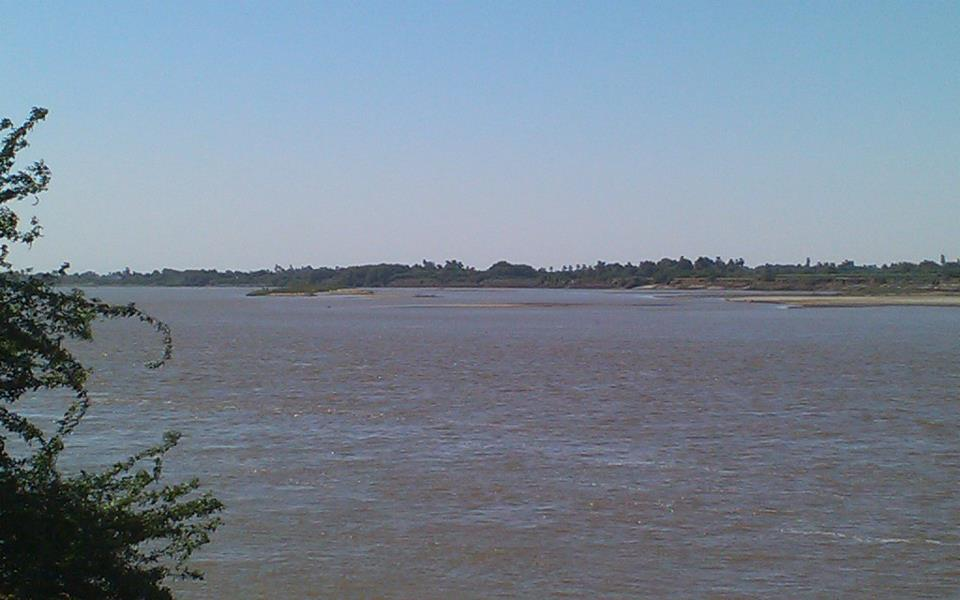
The White Nile at Rabak

Rabak (Arabic: ربك) is a city in south-eastern Sudan and the capital of the Sudanese state of White Nile. Numerous factories are based in the industrial-oriented city, such as the Kenana Sugar Company.

== Geography ==
The city is located on the eastern bank of the White Nile, facing Kosti on the western bank. It lies some 362 meters above sea level. Rabak is approximately 260 kilometres (160 mi) south of Khartoum and 340 kilometres (210 mi) west of the Ethiopian border. It is linked to the north of Sudan via the Khartoum–Rabak road; and it is linked by road eastward to Sennar and westward to Al-Ubayyid.

=== Climate ===
Rabak has a hot arid climate (Köppen climate classification BWh), despite receiving over 350 millimetres or 14 inches of rainfall annually, owing to the extremely high potential evapotranspiration.

Climate data for Rabak (altitude 381 metres or 1,250 feet, 1981-2010)
Month	Jan	Feb	Mar	Apr	May	Jun	Jul	Aug	Sep	Oct	Nov	Dec	Year
Record high °C (°F)	41.0 (105.8)	42.8 (109.0)	46.0 (114.8)	47.5 (117.5)	46.2 (115.2)	44.4 (111.9)	45.0 (113.0)	41.0 (105.8)	44.0 (111.2)	42.5 (108.5)	42.2 (108.0)	40.5 (104.9)	47.5 (117.5)
Mean daily maximum °C (°F)	33.7 (92.7)	34.9 (94.8)	39.1 (102.4)	41.9 (107.4)	42.2 (108.0)	39.8 (103.6)	36.3 (97.3)	34.5 (94.1)	35.8 (96.4)	38.4 (101.1)	37.4 (99.3)	34.6 (94.3)	37.3 (99.1)
Daily mean °C (°F)	24.3 (75.7)	25.8 (78.4)	29.3 (84.7)	32.6 (90.7)	33.6 (92.5)	32.3 (90.1)	29.8 (85.6)	28.8 (83.8)	29.7 (85.5)	31.2 (88.2)	29.0 (84.2)	25.8 (78.4)	29.2 (84.6)
Mean daily minimum °C (°F)	16.5 (61.7)	17.0 (62.6)	20.3 (68.5)	23.5 (74.3)	25.5 (77.9)	25.3 (77.5)	23.7 (74.7)	23.3 (73.9)	23.2 (73.8)	23.7 (74.7)	21.1 (70.0)	17.9 (64.2)	21.6 (70.9)
Record low °C (°F)	9.4 (48.9)	7.4 (45.3)	12.0 (53.6)	11.9 (53.4)	16.3 (61.3)	15.0 (59.0)	17.4 (63.3)	17.2 (63.0)	18.9 (66.0)	18.9 (66.0)	12.0 (53.6)	7.5 (45.5)	7.4 (45.3)
Average rainfall mm (inches)	0.4 (0.02)	0.0 (0.0)	2.5 (0.10)	3.8 (0.15)	16.7 (0.66)	39.2 (1.54)	95.7 (3.77)	116.6 (4.59)	72.1 (2.84)	8.9 (0.35)	1.8 (0.07)	0.3 (0.01)	358 (14.1)
Source 1: Meteo Climat
Source 2: Meteo Climat

== Demographics ==
Year	Inhabitants
1973 (Census)	18,399
1983 (Census)	26,693
1993 (Census)	59,261
2007 (Estimate)	152,711

== History ==
=== Prehistory ===
The Rabak locality contains a Neolithic settlement on a riverbank terrace approximately 3 km (1.9 mi) east of the present White Nile river. The site has cultural deposits 60–80 cm (24–31 in) in depth, including fish bones and other food waste. The radiocarbon dates sur veyed hints to possible human settlement of the area around c. 6000 and 4500 BP, with the earliest levels contemporary with Khartoum Neolithic sites.

=== 20th century ===
In 1910, the construction of a one-way bridge near the city, likely on the Nile, began. It was mainly a railway line, with only one lane for vehicles.

By the 1980s, a newer bridge was started, being built to connect the town to the rest of the country, with the bridge carrying more vehicles and pedestrians. In a survey conducted in the city from 2007 to 2010, 3.5% of the respondents said that the implementation of the new bridge likely contributed in its rapid urban growth.

Rabak was made the capital of the White Nile State in 1994.

=== 21st century ===
In June 2026, during the Sudanese civil war, RSF launched a drone strike on Rabak, killing 2 civilians, injuring 7, and damaging a fuel station.

=== Former airport ===
Rabak Kosti Airport
- IATA: KST; ICAO: HSKI

Summary
- Airport type: Closed
- Serves: Rabak and Kosti
- Location: Sudan
- Elevation AMSL: 1,289 ft (393 m)
- Coordinates: 13°10′40″N 32°43′05″E

Map
- Location of the airport in Sudan

Rabak Airport (IATA: KST, ICAO: HSKI) was an airport formerly serving the cities of Kosti and Rabak in the White Nile State of Sudan. The dirt runways have been overbuilt with housing.

== Economy ==
Rabak is one of major commercial cities in Sudan owing to its unique location in the country and its transportation links to the other major Sudanese states. In the city, there is a cement processing company named Nile Cement Company, which produced 50,200 tons in 2001 and 41,000 tons in 2002. There is a calcite mine nearby the locality, as well as industrial facilities including the Kenana Sugar Factory, Asalaya Sugar Factory, oil refineries, and other manufacturing plants.

The city is built on a major highway where the settlements of Sennar and Kosti are also connected to.

== See also ==
- Railway stations in Sudan
