= List of airports in Sudan =

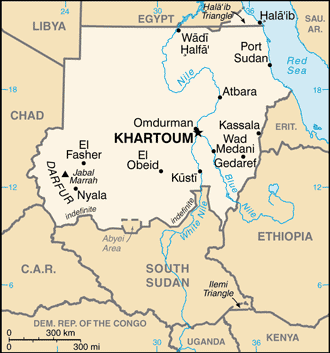
Map of Sudan

States of Sudan: Al Qadarif (13), Blue Nile (5), Central Darfur (16), East Darfur (17), Gezira (9), Kassala (4), Khartoum (1), North Darfur (6), North Kordofan (2), Northern (3), Red Sea (12), River Nile (11), Sennar (14), South Darfur (7), South Kordofan (8), West Darfur (15), West Kordofan (18), White Nile (10).

This is a list of airports in Sudan, sorted by location.

Sudan, officially the Republic of the Sudan, sometimes called North Sudan is an Arab state in North Africa. It is bordered by Egypt to the north, the Red Sea to the northeast, Eritrea and Ethiopia to the east, South Sudan to the south, the Central African Republic to the southwest, Chad to the west, and Libya to the northwest. The Nile divides the country into eastern and western halves. The capital city is Khartoum. The country is divided into 18 states.

== Airports ==
Airport names shown in bold indicate the airport has scheduled service on commercial airlines.

City served	State	ICAO	IATA	Airport name
**Public airports**
Atbara (Atbarah)	River Nile	HSAT	ATB	Atbara Airport
Carthago	Red Sea	HSCG		Carthago Airport
Damazin (Ad Damazin)	Blue Nile	HSDZ	RSS	**Damazin Airport**
Dilling (Dalang)	South Kurdufan	HSDL		Dilling Airport
Dinder	Sennar	HSGG	DNX	Galegu Airport
Dongola (Dunqulah)	Northern	HSDN	DOG	**Dongola Airport**
Ed Daein	East Darfur		ADV	Ed Daein Airport
El Daein (Ed Dueim)	White Nile			El Daein Airport
El Debba (Al-Dabbah)	Northern	HSDB	EDB	El Debba Airport
El Fasher (Al-Fashir)	North Darfur	HSFS	ELF	**El Fasher Airport**
El Obeid (Al-Ubayyid)	North Kurdufan	HSOB	EBD	**El Obeid Airport**
En Nahud	North Kurdufan	HSNH	NUD	En Nahud Airport
Gedaref (Al-Qadarif)	Al Qadarif	HSGF	GSU	Azaza Airport
Heglig	South Kordofan	HSHG	HEG	Heglig Airport
Jabal Awliya (Jebel Aulia)	Khartoum			Jabal Awliya Airport
Geneina (Al-Junaynah)	West Darfur	HSGN	EGN	**Geneina Airport**
Kadugli (Kaduqli)	South Kurdufan	HSLI	KDX	Kadugli Airport
Kassala	Kassala	HSKA	KSL	**Kassala Airport**
Khartoum	Khartoum	HSSK	KRT	**Khartoum International Airport**
Khashm el Girba	Kassala	HSKG	GBU	Khashm el Girba Airport
Merowe	Northern	HSMR	MWE	**Merowe Airport**
New Halfa	Kassala	HSNW	NHF	New Halfa Airport
Nyala	South Darfur	HSNN	UYL	**Nyala Airport**
Port Sudan	Red Sea	HSPN	PZU	**Port Sudan New International Airport**
Sennar	Blue Nile	HSNR		Sennar Airport
Shendi	River Nile	HSND		Shendi Airport
Showak	Al Qadarif			Wad Zayed Airport
Sifeiya / Rabak	White Nile	HSKN		Kenana Airport
Wad Medani	Al Jazirah	HSWD	DNI	Wad Medani Airport - Closed
Wadi Halfa	Northern	HSSW	WHF	Wadi Halfa Airport
Zalingei	Central Darfur	HSZA		Zalingei Airport
**Military airports**
Port Sudan	Red Sea	HSSP		Port Sudan Military Airport
Omdurman	Khartoum	HSWS		Wadi Seidna Air Base

== See also ==
- List of airports in South Sudan
- List of airports by ICAO code: H#HS - Sudan and South Sudan
- Transport in Sudan
- Wikipedia:WikiProject Aviation/Airline destination lists: Africa#Sudan
