= Marsland Aviation =

IATA	ICAO	Call sign
M7	MSL	MARSLANDAIR
- Founded: 2001
- Ceased operations: 2013
- Hubs: Khartoum International Airport; Juba Airport
- Frequent-flyer program: Marsland Frequent Flyer Club
- Alliance: Jamah Group
- Fleet size: 3
- Destinations: 10
- Headquarters: Khartoum, Sudan
- Key people: Rashid Ortashi
- Website: http://www.marsland-avi.com/

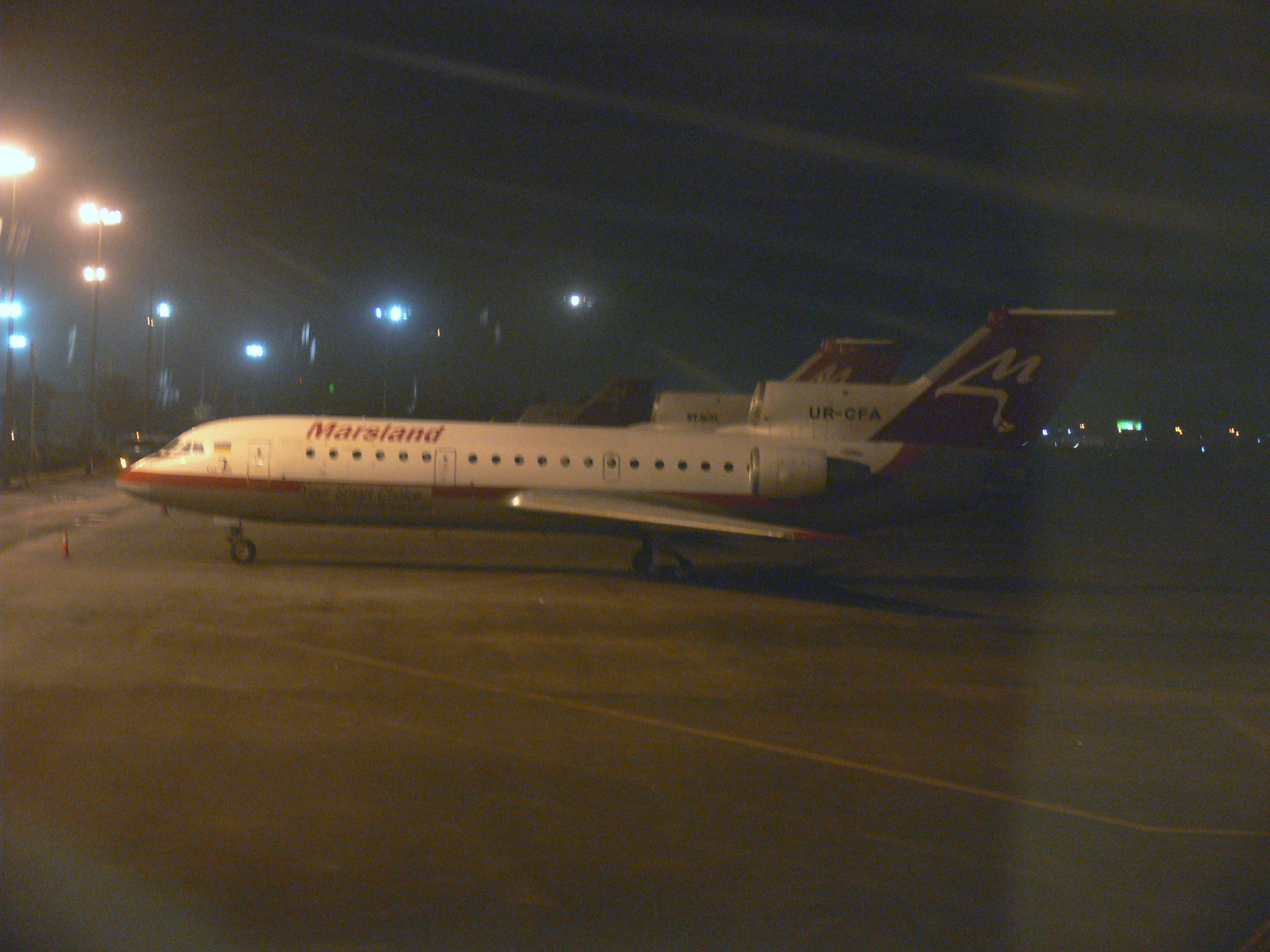
A Marsland Aviation Yak-42D at Khartoum

Marsland Aviation was an airline based in Khartoum, Sudan. It suspended operations in November 2013.

== Destinations ==
As of December 2012, Marsland Aviations operated scheduled passenger flights to the following destinations:

- Egypt
  - Cairo (Cairo International Airport)
- Kenya
  - Nairobi (Jomo Kenyatta International Airport)
- South Sudan
  - Juba (Juba Airport) hub
  - Malakal (Malakal Airport)
  - Rumbek (Rumbek Airport)
- Sudan
  - Al-Fashir (El Fasher Airport)
  - El Obeid (El Obeid Airport)
  - Khartoum (Khartoum International Airport) base
  - Nyala (Nyala Airport)

== Fleet ==
The Marsland Aviation fleet consisted of the following aircraft (as of December 2012):

Marsland Aviation fleet
Aircraft	Total	Passengers (Business/Economy)	Notes
Tupolev Tu-134	1		operated for Dove Air Services
Boeing 737-200	1		operated by Sun Air (Sudan)
Yakovlev Yak-42D	1	8/100	
Total	3		
