= Sun Air Aviation =

Private airline in Sudan

| IATA | ICAO | Call sign |
|---|---|---|
| SO | SNR | SUN GROUP |
- Founded: 2008
- Hubs: Khartoum International Airport
- Fleet size: 6
- Destinations: 16
- Headquarters: Khartoum, Sudan
- Key people: Saif M. Saad Omer (chairman); Mohamed Saifeldin M. Saad Omer (chief executive officer)
- Website: sunairgroup.com

Sun Air Aviation is an inoperative private airline based in Khartoum, Sudan. As of October 2021, according to its website, Sun Air operates scheduled domestic flights between Khartoum and several domestic destinations. It also operates scheduled international flights between Khartoum and other cities in Africa and the Middle East. It is currently banned in the EU airspace.

As of January 2026, Sun Air Aviation has a status of idle but with the intent to restart operations. It was noted in March 2024, that the airline had renewed its air operator certificate to allow it to resume regular flights.

== Overview ==
The airline, is family owned and started operations in June 2008 with a fleet of one Airbus A310-300 aircraft, and three Boeing 737-200 aircraft. As of October 2021, the airline operates Embraer E-190, Airbus A330-200 and Airbus A321 aircraft.

== Fleet ==
As of September 2021, the Sun Air fleet consisted of the following aircraft.

Sun Air (Sudan) fleet
| Aircraft | In fleet | Orders | Passengers | | | | Notes |
| Aircraft | In fleet | Orders | C | P | Y | Total | Notes |
|---|---|---|---|---|---|---|---|
| Embraer E-190 | 2 | — | | 14 | 86 | 100 | |
| Airbus A330-200 | 2 | — | 20 | 21 | 203 | 244 | |
| Airbus A321-200 | 2 | — | 12 | 24 | 143 | 179 | |
| Total | 6 | — | | | | | |

== Previous fleet ==
In the past, Sun Air has operated the following aircraft:

1. Fokker F27
2. Antonov An-12
3. Antonov An-24
4. Antonov An-26
5. Antonov An-32
6. Yakovlev Yak-42
7. Yakovlev Yak-40
8. Ilyushin Il-76
9. Boeing 737-200
10. Boeing 737-200
11. Boeing 737-400
12. Boeing 737-800
13. Boeing 747
14. Boeing 757
15. Boeing 767
16. Airbus A310
17. Airbus A320

== Destinations ==
According to the airline's website, the airline maintains regular passenger service to the following domestic and international destinations: With consultation assistance from Lufthansa Consulting, a subsidiary of the German aniline Deutsche Lufthansa AG, Sun Air is actively pursuing the opening of routes to Uganda, Nigeria, Lebanon, Saudi Arabia and Syria.

| Country | City | Airport | Notes | Refs |
|---|---|---|---|---|
| Bahrain | Al Muharraq | Bahrain International Airport | | |
| Egypt | Cairo | Cairo International Airport | | |
| Lebanon | Beirut | Beirut International Airport | | |
| Nigeria | Kano | Kano International Airport | | |
| South Sudan | Juba | Juba International Airport | | |
| Sudan | Khartoum | Khartoum International Airport | Hub | |
| Sudan | Nyala | Nyala Airport | | |
| Sudan | Port Sudan | Port Sudan Airport | | |
| Sudan | Geneina | Geneina Airport | | |
| Sudan | El Fasher | El Fasher Airport | | |
| Turkey | Istanbul | Istanbul International Airport | | |
| Saudi Arabia | Jeddah | Jeddah International Airport | | |
| Saudi Arabia | Riyadh | Riyadh International Airport | | |
| United Arab Emirates | Dubai | Dubai International Airport | | |
| United Arab Emirates | Sharjah | Sharjah International Airport | | |
| Syria | Damascus | Damascus International Airport | | |

== See also ==
- List of airlines in Sudan
