= Rapid Support Forces occupation of the Khartoum International Airport =

Military occupation of the Khartoum International Airport during the War in Sudan

- Part of the Battle of Khartoum in the Sudanese civil war (2023–present)
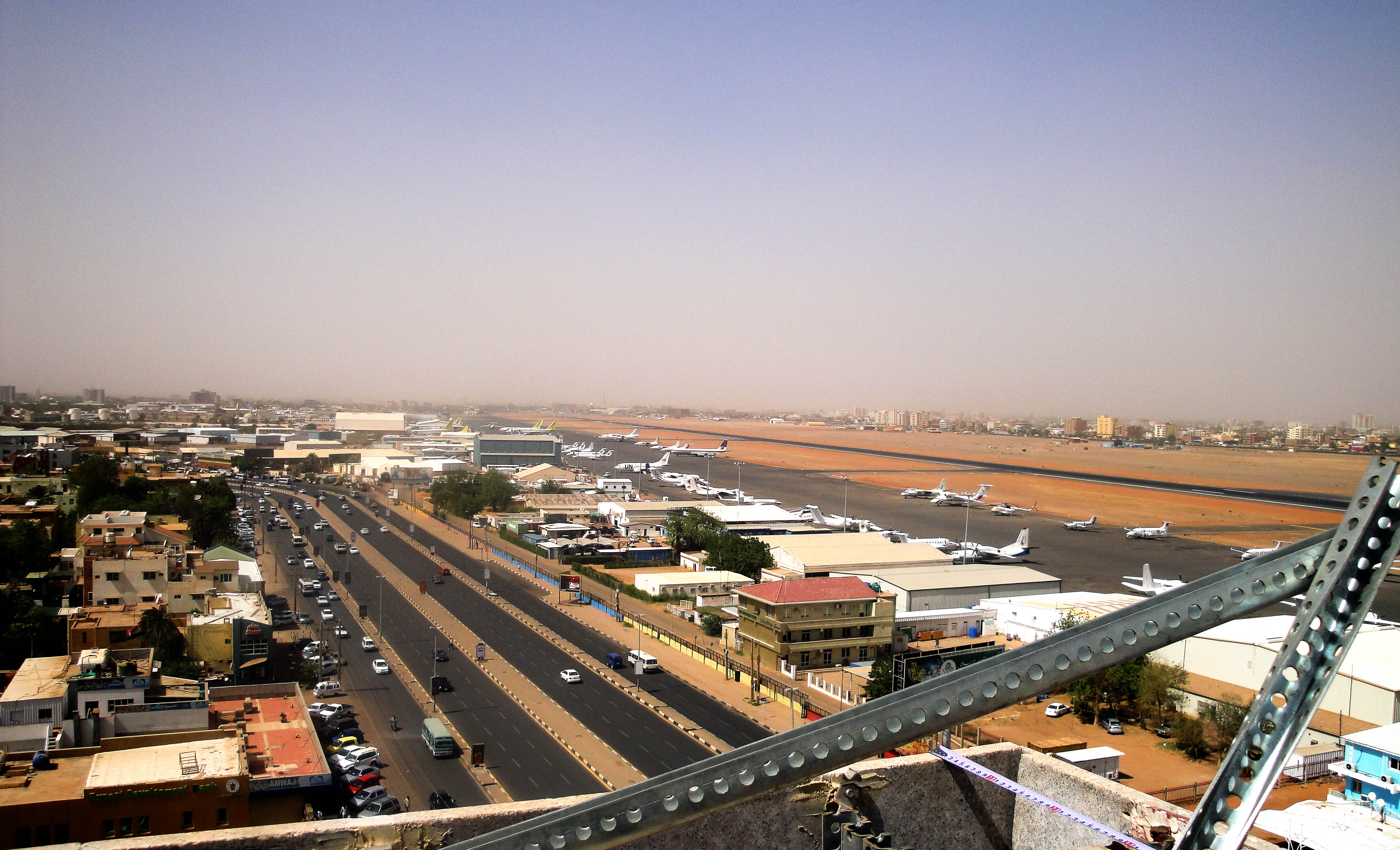
- Khartoum International Airport in 2011
Date	15 April 2023 – 25 March 2025 (1 year, 11 months, 1 week and 3 days)
Location	Khartoum International Airport, Khartoum, Sudan; 15°35′22″N 32°33′11″E
Result	SAF victory: RSF retreated from airport on 25 March 2025

Belligerents
Sudanese government; Sudanese Armed Forces	Rapid Support Forces

Casualties and losses
- 2 civilians killed

From 15 April 2023 to 25 March 2025, the Rapid Support Forces (RSF) occupied the Khartoum International Airport, Sudan's most important airport, during the War in Sudan as part of the Battle of Khartoum.

The RSF forces managed to capture the airport in the early hours of the attacks on Khartoum, the airport itself was the place of the first official attack of the entire conflict. The attack also killed two people.

The occupation of the airport caused the destruction of between 10 and 20 civilian aircraft from several countries. Attacks on it continued across the occupation, destroying the airport.

On 25 March 2025, RSF forces retreated from the airport after SAF forces came closer to Jabal Awliya, which was a last RSF's point of connection with Khartoum.

== Background ==
Khartoum International Airport is located in the city of Khartoum, the capital of Sudan, and it is the largest airport in Sudan. It is considered the headquarters and operations center of Sudan Airways and Badr Airlines. The current location of the airport is considered a threat to air safety and urban security standards, and the Sudanese government decided to close the current airport after completing the construction of the new Khartoum Airport, which is being built 40 km (25 mi) from the center of Khartoum.

The airport was established following World War II in 1947, and was expanded to accommodate air traffic in the 1970s and 1980s.

== First attack and takeover ==
In the early hours of the morning of 15 April 2023, the Rapid Support Forces initiated a series of assaults on key installations in Khartoum, including the Khartoum International Airport. During the attack on the airport, the RSF reportedly fired on a Saudia airliner which was arriving at the airport, but no casualties were reported among the aircraft's passengers and crew. The RSF also captured the presidential palace, the residence of former Sudanese president Omar al-Bashir, and attacked a military base. In the fighting at the Khartoum airport, two civilians were killed. Hemedti claimed that the RSF controlled most of the city's government buildings, but this was disputed by Burhan.

The same day, several aerial attacks against the RSF targets were conducted by the SAF. Users on Facebook Live and Twitter documented the Sudanese Air Force (SAF) flying above the city and striking the RSF targets. On 17 April, the Sudanese government announced the closure of Sudan's airspace, initially limited solely to that of Khartoum. A ceasefire was declared on 18 April at 18:00 local time, leading to a reduction in fighting in the vicinity of the airport.

== August explosion and clashes at the airport ==
On 26 August 2023, an explosion near the airport caused damage across Khartoum. The Sudanese Armed Forces (SAF) later said that the explosion occurred due to a fire caused by an aviation fuel depot inside the airport. The SAF also carried out attacks against the RSF forces in the airport.

== Destruction of aircraft ==
On 15 April 2023, the first day of war. It was shown according to Flightradar24, several aircraft belonging to Saudia, Badr Airlines, and SkyUp Airlines were damaged. Later, Saudia confirmed that one of its planes was targeted before takeoff, leading to the evacuation of all passengers, crew, and staff to the Saudi Embassy.

Later on 17 April 2023, it was shown by an analysis made by the New York Times via satellite, from both Maxar and Planet Labs, that showed that around 20 planes were destroyed during the attacks at the airport.

As of 21 April, the following destroyed or damaged aircraft were reported in Khartoum:

- (Saudi Arabia) Saudia Airbus A330-343, registration HZ-AQ30
- (Ukraine) SkyUp Airlines Boeing 737-86Q(WL), registration UR-SQH
- (Ukraine) SkyUp Airlines Boeing 737-8H6(WL), registration UR-SQA
- (Sudan) Badr Airlines Boeing 737-8AL, registration 4L-MWA
- (Indonesia) Asia Cargo Airlines Boeing 737-33A(SF), registration PK-YGW
- (Belarus) Belcanto Airlines Ilyushin IL-76, registration EW-576TH
- One Ilyushin IL-62, registration ST-PRA (owned by the Government of Sudan)
- Three Ilyushin IL-76M
- Two AN-74
- One AN-12

Following the conflict and destruction at Khartoum International Airport, flights on several airlines to and from Sudan were promptly cancelled. The ongoing fighting in the vicinity of the airport and the destruction of civilian aircraft posed significant challenges for evacuating foreigners from the area. As a result, many individuals had no choice but to undertake long journeys by car to Port Sudan, approximately 650 km northeast of Khartoum.

Furthermore, the destruction of the World Food Programme's aircraft severely impacted the organization's capacity to transport staff and deliver assistance to people across the country.

On 28 April, a Turkish evacuation plane came under fire at the Wadi Seidna Air Base. The aircraft's fuselage sustained damage, particularly to the fuel system, requiring major repairs.

== RSF retreat and attacks ==
On 25 March 2025, RSF retreated from the airport after SAF forces came closer to Jabal Awliya, which was a last RSF's point of connection with Khartoum, which was a risk of loss of last supply line.

Drones attack occurred on 4 May 2026 following a series of attacks by the RSF on three strategic locations in Khartoum, including the international airport which was intercepted by the SAF. In addition to the airport, drone strikes were reported at the Signal Corps in Khartoum Bahri and Al-Markhiyat camp in northern Omdurman. Following the attack, airport staff were evacuated and a flight scheduled to arrive from the Port Sudan International Airport was cancelled. The attack was condemned by Saudi Arabia, the United States, Qatar, the General Secretariat of the Organisation of Islamic Cooperation, the United Kingdom and European Union. Sudan recalled its ambassador to Ethiopia following the attack and accused Ethiopia and the United Arab Emirates of involvement in the attack, which they denied. Flights resumed to the airport on 8 May 2026.
