= HSSP =

HSSP may refer to:

- Homology-derived Secondary Structure of Proteins, a protein database
- Port Sudan Military Airport, ICAO airport code HSSP, an airport in Sudan
