= Badr Airlines =

Airline based in Khartoum, Sudan

IATA	ICAO	Call sign
J4	BDR	BADR AIR
- Founded: 2004 (rebranded from Sarit Airlines)
- Hubs: Khartoum International Airport
- Secondary hubs: Port Sudan New International Airport
- Fleet size: 7
- Destinations: 17
- Headquarters: Khartoum
- Website: badrairlines.com

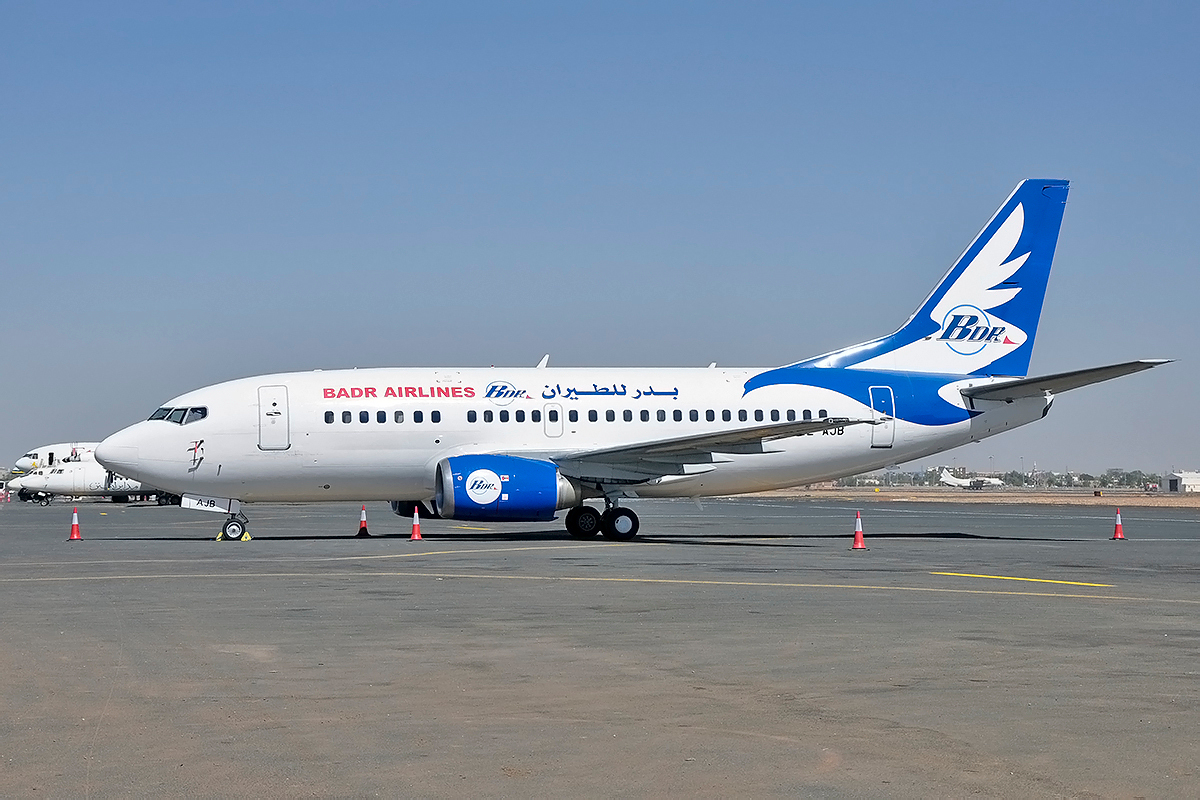
Badr Airlines B737-500 in Khartoum International Airport

Badr Airlines, formerly Sarit Airlines (from 1997 to 2004), is an airline based in Khartoum, Sudan, operating cargo and passenger air services for humanitarian aid missions and chartered VIP flights. Its main base is Khartoum International Airport.

Badr Airlines is a member of Arab Air Carriers' Organization and African Airlines Association. The airline is banned from European Union airspace as it does not fulfil international safety standards similar to all other Sudanese airlines.

== Destinations ==
As of November 2026, Badr Airlines operates regular flights to the following destinations.

Country	City	Airport	Notes
Egypt	Cairo	Cairo International Airport	
Ethiopia	Addis Ababa	Addis Ababa Bole International Airport	
Oman	Muscat	Muscat International Airport	
Rwanda	Kigali	Kigali International Airport	
Saudi Arabia	Jeddah	King Abdulaziz International Airport	
Saudi Arabia	Riyadh	King Khalid International Airport	
South Sudan	Juba	Juba International Airport	
Sudan	Damazin	Damazin Airport	Terminated
Sudan	El Fasher	El Fasher Airport	Terminated
Sudan	El Obeid	El Obeid Airport	Terminated
Sudan	Geneina	Geneina Airport	Terminated
Sudan	Kassala	Kassala Airport	Terminated
Sudan	Khartoum	Khartoum International Airport	
Sudan	Nyala	Nyala Airport	Terminated
Sudan	Port Sudan	Port Sudan New International Airport	Hub
Turkey	Istanbul	Istanbul Airport	
Uganda	Entebbe	Entebbe International Airport	
United Arab Emirates	Dubai	Dubai International Airport	Suspended

== Incidents and accidents ==
- April 2023, a Badr Airlines Boeing 737-800 was destroyed at Khartoum Airport during fighting between government forces and the Rapid Support Forces during the RSF occupation of the Khartoum International Airport.

== Fleet ==
As of August 2025, Badr Airlines operated the following aircraft:

Badr Airlines fleet
Aircraft	In service	Orders	Capacity	Notes
Boeing 737-500	4	—	108 - 8C/100Y	
Boeing 737-800	2	—	176 - 8C/168	
Ilyushin Il-76TD	1	—		
