= Arab Air Carriers' Organization =

Organization of airlines

- الإتحاد العربي للنقل الجوي
- Formation: August 25, 1965; 61 years ago
- Headquarters: Beirut, Lebanon
- Official language: Arabic
- Secretary General: Abdul Wahab Teffaha
- Chairman of the Executive Committee: Ibrahim Al Omar
- Website: www.aaco.org

The Arab Air Carriers' Organization (Arab:الإتحاد العربي للنقل الجوي) is a non-profit organization with 36 member airlines from 19 countries within North Africa and the Middle East and home-based in country members of the Arab League. The countries are Algeria, Bahrain, Egypt, Iraq, Jordan, Kuwait, Lebanon, Libya, Mauritania, Morocco, Oman, Qatar, Saudi Arabia, Sudan, Syria, Tunisia, the United Arab Emirates, and Yemen. It is headquartered in Beirut, Lebanon. The AACO members collectively offer 3,900 daily flights to 430 airports in 122 countries.

== History ==
AACO was established on 25 August 1965 upon the recommendation of the Transport Committee of the League of Arab States and the endorsement of the Arab transport minister with 13 founding member airlines.

== Basis of AACO`s work ==
AACO translates its vision and mission through four different pillars which are: joint collaboration, external representation, awareness, and networking.

The Arab Air Carriers’ Organization(AACO) provides a framework for cooperation among its members in many areas such as Environment, Aeropolitical Affairs, Digital Transformation, Fuel, Sustainable Aviation Fuel (SAF), In-flight Medical Emergencies, Maintenance Repair and Overhaul (MRO), Distribution, Emergency Response Planning (ERP), Aviation Security, Training through AACO’s Regional Training Center, and others.

=== Membership ===
- Member Airlines – Membership at AACO is open to Arab airlines operating both scheduled and non-scheduled operations, internationally or domestically, and cargo.
- Partner airlines – where non – Arab airlines can join AACO as partners and benefit from the platform of cooperation between its members.
- Industry partners – The AACO Industry Partnership Program established in 1996, the program creates an environment where partners benefit from AACO events and activities to strengthen their relations with member airlines.

=== Members ===
| Member airline | Joined | Airline alliance |
|---|---|---|
| Afriqiyah Airways | 2002 | —N/a |
| Air Algérie | 1971 | —N/a |
| Air Arabia | 2004 | —N/a |
| Air Cairo | 2007 | —N/a |
| Badr Airlines | 2015 | —N/a |
| Berniq Airways | 2024 | —N/a |
| EgyptAir^{[A]} | 1965 | Star Alliance |
| Emirates | 1989 | —N/a |
| Etihad Airways | 2004 | —N/a |
| flyadeal | 2023 | —N/a |
| flydubai | 2014 | —N/a |
| flynas | 2012 | —N/a |
| Gulf Air | 1971 | —N/a |
| Iraqi Airways^{[A]} | 1965 | —N/a |
| Jordan Aviation | 2004 | —N/a |
| Kuwait Airways^{[A]} | 1965 | —N/a |
| Libyan Airlines | 1970 | —N/a |
| Mauritania Airlines | 2015 | —N/a |
| Middle East Airlines^{[A]} | 1965 | SkyTeam |
| Nesma Airlines | 2022 | —N/a |
| Nile Air | 2014 | —N/a |
| Nouvelair | 2011 | —N/a |
| Oman Air | 1997 | Oneworld |
| Palestinian Airlines | 1999 | |
| Qatar Airways | 1997 | Oneworld |
| Red Sea Airlines | 2023 | —N/a |
| Riyadh Air | 2023 | —N/a |
| Royal Air Maroc | 1974 | Oneworld |
| Royal Jordanian^{[A]} | 1965 | Oneworld |
| Saudia^{[A]} | 1965 | SkyTeam |
| Sudan Airways^{[A]} | 1965 | —N/a |
| Syrian Air^{[A]} | 1965 | —N/a |
| Tarco Aviation | 2019 | —N/a |
| Tassili Airlines | 2012 | —N/a |
| Tunisair | 1972 | —N/a |
| Yemenia^{[A]} | 1965 | —N/a |

^{A} Founding member

=== Partners ===
- International Airlines Group
- Malaysia Airlines (Oneworld)
- Pegasus Airlines
- Turkish Airlines (Star Alliance)
- Fly Jinnah

=== Locations ===
- AACO Headquarter: Beirut Harbor 1504 building, George Haddad Street, Saifi Area – Downtown, Lebanon
- RTC Amman: 12 Abdallah Ben Omar Street, Shmeisani, Amman – Jordan
- RTC Cairo: Cairo International Airport, EgyptAir Training Center, S-Building, Third Floor, Cairo, Egypt

=== Regional Training Center (RTC) ===
AACO Regional Training Center (RTC) was established in 1996. Its mission is to provide training opportunities that maximize the performance of the human capital in the region.

=== Annual General Meeting (AGM) ===
AACO's AGM is held once annually to develop and present strategies and a roadmap for AACO. The Annual General Assembly of AACO brings together the CEOs of AACO member airlines, in addition to a number of stakeholders, AACO partner airlines and industry partners, as well as international and local press.

=== Forums ===
AACO Forums aim to provide platforms for communication and networking between members, partner airlines, regulators, associations, and suppliers in the aviation industry.

=== Publications ===
- The NASHRA – Industry's Pulse & Arab Aviation – is AACO's official monthly bulletin that is distributed electronically in the English language. The Nashra was re-designed in 2013 and became available in digital format. The Nashra is a monthly recap of aviation in the Arab world on a regional and international level.
- AACO Annual Report includes a review of the work conducted by AACO projects’ steering boards, work groups, and task forces, in addition to industry updates in the Arab world region and worldwide.
- AATS – Arab Air Transport Statistics: This annual bulletin highlights the major operational developments related to the Arab airlines and airports as well as a synopsis of the world air transport developments at large, in addition to statistical information about general trends of the economy with emphasis on the air transport and tourism sectors in the Arab world. The bulletin includes brief information about each AACO member and partner airline.

- Safe & Level: The Safe & Level is a monthly electronic bulletin that revolves around major safety developments, accidents, and reports in the aviation industry at the international and regional levels.
- Sustainable Aviation Fuel Updates: AACO’s Sustainable Aviation Fuel Updates is a weekly bulletin that includes updates on policy and business issues related to sustainable aviation fuels.
- Fuel Bulletin: The Fuel Bulletin is published electronically every two months. The bulletin covers events and issues related to the aviation fuel industry at the technical, environmental, and commercial levels.
