= HSFS =

HSFS may refer to:

- El Fasher Airport, in Sudan
- High Sierra Format, a filesystem
