= Kassala Airport =

Airport in Kassala, Sudan

- IATA: KSL; ICAO: HSKA

Summary
- Airport type: Public
- Operator: Government
- Serves: Kassala, Sudan
- Elevation AMSL: 1,671 ft (509 m)
- Coordinates: 15°23′14″N 036°19′43″E

Map
- Location within Sudan

Runways
Direction	Length		Surface
Direction	m	ft	Surface
02/20	2,500	8,202	Asphalt

Kassala Airport (IATA: KSL, ICAO: HSKA) is an airport serving Kassala, the capital city of the state of Kassala in Sudan.

== Facilities ==
The airport resides at an elevation of 1,671 feet (509 m) above mean sea level. It has one runway designated 02/20 with an asphalt surface measuring 2,500 by 45 metres (8,202 ft × 148 ft).

== Airlines and destinations ==
Airlines	Destinations
Badr Airlines	Khartoum (suspended)
Tarco Aviation	Port Sudan
