= 2025 Nyala Boeing 737 incident =

2025 aircraft occurrence in Sudan

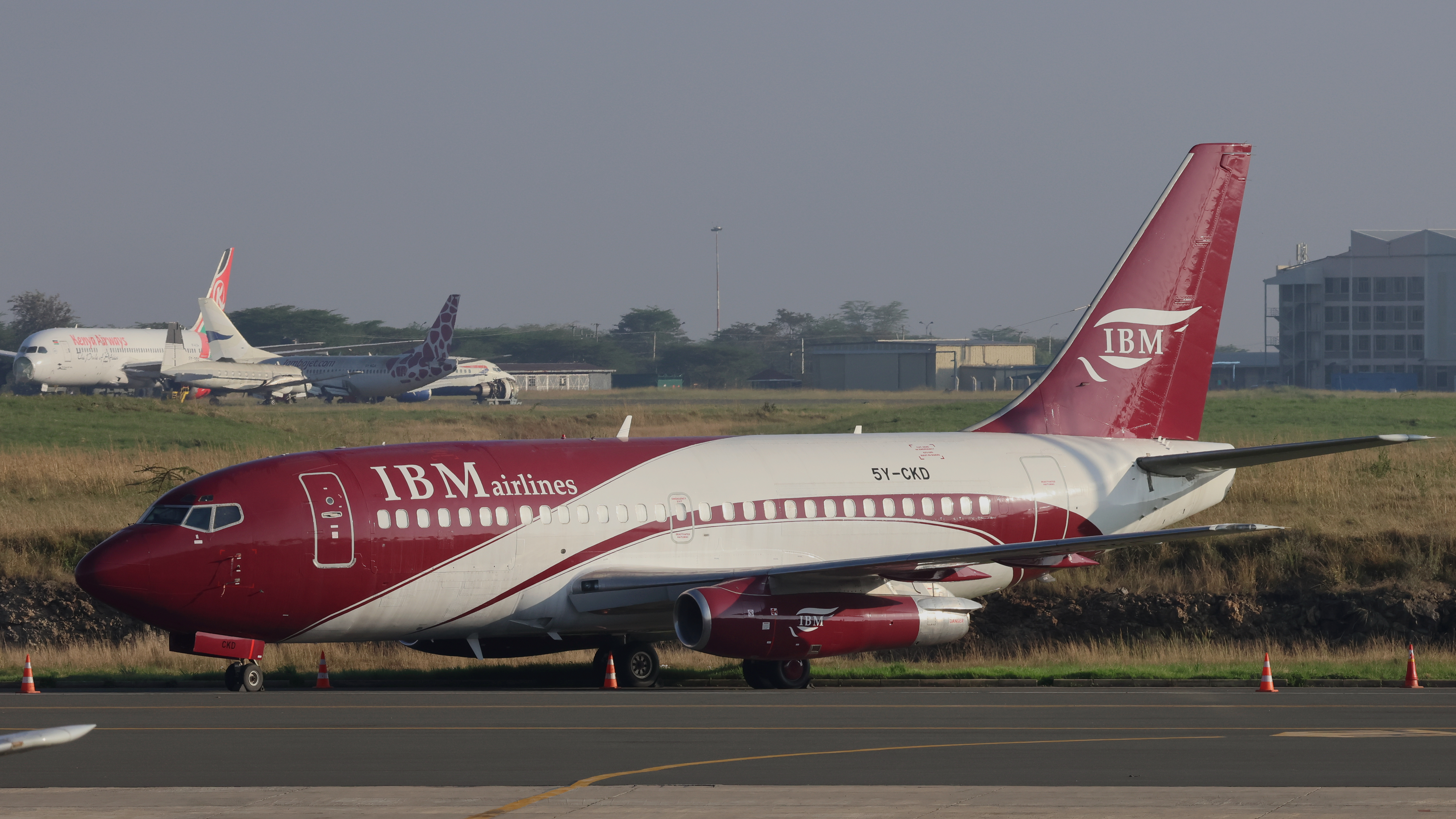
- 5Y-CKD, the aircraft involved, seen in 2024

Occurrence
- Date: 3 May 2025
- Summary: Destroyed by the Sudanese Armed Forces
- Site: Nyala Airport, Nyala, Sudan; 12°03′13″N 024°57′22″E

Aircraft
- Aircraft type: Boeing 737-290C Advanced (Note: Some sources falsely claim that the aircraft type was a Boeing 727.)
- Registration: 5Y-CKD
- Flight origin: Wau Airport, Wau, South Sudan
- Destination: Nyala Airport, Nyala, Sudan
- Occupants: 111+
- Passengers: 108
- Crew: 3
- Fatalities: 54
- Injuries: 57
- Survivors: 57

On 3 May 2025, a cargo Boeing 737-200 was destroyed at Nyala Airport by the Sudanese Armed Forces (SAF) during the Sudanese civil war. It was destroyed due to suspicions of carrying military weapons and supplies to the Rapid Support Forces (RSF). Sources initially stated that 20 or 90 occupants on board the aircraft were killed, and disagreed on whether the aircraft was bombed or shot down. In 2026, Reuters stated that 54 on board were killed, including 51 RSF fighters and 3 crew members. They also stated a further 57 were injured, and that the aircraft was destroyed by air strikes.

== Background ==
=== Political situation ===
Since 15 April 2023, a civil war has broken out in Sudan between the SAF and the paramilitary RSF.

=== Aircraft and operator ===
The aircraft involved was a Boeing 737-290C Advanced and the aircraft registration was 5Y-CKD. It was manufactured in 1981, and was acquired by Kenyan cargo airline IBM Airlines on 14 March 2024. The Kenya Civil Aviation Authority (KCAA) had banned the aircraft from operating in Kenya for unknown reasons. It was the only aircraft operated by the airline, however it was unclear who owned or was operating the aircraft at the time of the incident. Two of the crew members were employed by Emirati-registered company Occidental Support Services, owned by US Army veteran Steven Shaulis. Reuters were able to link Shaulis to at least three Boeing aircraft flying to logistic hubs of the Rapid Support Forces.

=== Passengers and crew ===
According to Reuters, there were at least 111 occupants on board the aircraft, Including both pilots and a ground handler. as well as, according to some reports, 70 Sudanese nationals who were transported for medical reasons.

- The captain of the flight was 52-year-old Kenyan pilot Michael George Oluoch Nyamodi. He was described as highly skilled and respected. He was once detained for violating aviation rules in South Sudan. He was the brother of Kenyan President William Ruto's lawyer, Paul Nyamondi.
- The co-pilot was South Sudanese pilot Samson Ohide. He was also the secretary general of the South Sudanese Pilots Association as well as a pilot with the South Sudan People's Defence Forces (SSPDF).

== Incident ==
The aircraft started operations at Wau Airport. The aircraft was suspected of carrying military weapons and supplies to the RSF. Nyala is controlled by the RSF which uses the airport at the city to transport military equipment. One article by the Daily Nation claims the aircraft was bombed by the SAF. However, other articles by the Daily Nation say it was hit by artillery and shot down by the SAF as it prepared to land at the airport. One source just said it was destroyed at the airport by the SAF. Other sources say the aircraft was shot down by the SAF due to suspicions of it supplying the RSF. It was later stated that the aircraft was destroyed in an air-strike, with 54 occupants killed and a further 57 were transported to hospital for injuries.

== Aftermath ==
This incident has increased suspicions of Kenya supporting and supplying the RSF. Sudan's Vice President of the Transitional Sovereignty Council Malik Agar had previously sent a letter on 14 March 2025, which accused Kenyan President William Ruto of supporting the RSF.

The Government of Kenya has been accused of destabilizing Sudan by supporting the RSF. It has also been accused of trading gold with the RSF and of doing secret business dealings with RSF commander Hemedti. The Kenyan government had on multiple occasions hosted Hemedti at State House.

Kenya's Ministry of Foreign and Diaspora Affairs, the government's spokesperson, and Kenyan officials have remained silent on Captain Nyamodi's death.

Kenya's government did establish an investigation team following reports of this incident. It has been assigned with reviewing accident reports about registered or operated Kenyan aircraft in South Sudan and Somalia.

After South Sudanese pilot Ohide was killed in the incident, South Sudanese's officials issued warnings to citizens to not join the civil war in Sudan. The South Sudan government did not comment on why Ohide flew into a conflict zone. The Sudanese Deputy Head of Mission to South Sudan, Mubarak Mahgoub Musa addressed reports of Ohide's death by saying "Indeed, it is something reported in the media, but we do not have any confirmed information from the Sudanese authorities. We sincerely do not wish for such events to occur, nor do we want any citizens of South Sudan to be involved in this war." Ohide's body has not been recovered.

Nyamodi's body was moved to Chad and then repatriated back to Kenya. His requiem mass was held at St. Francis ACK Church. His brother Paul Nyamodi read his tribute at the requiem mass. Kenyan politician Raphael Tuju was an old friend of Nyamodi and spoke at a memorial service for him in Nairobi. Kenyan MP Samuel Atandi went to the home of the family of Nyamodi to condole and express sympathy with his death.

== See also ==
- 2024 Darfur Ilyushin Il-76 shootdown
- List of airliner shootdown incidents
- Air Lanka Flight 512
- 2025 Nyala Boeing 727 crash

== Notes ==
This particular 737-200 once flew for Alaska Airlines, citing its Boeing customer code of 90
