= Sudanese Air Force =

Aerial warfare branch of the Sudanese armed forces

- القوّات الجوّيّة السودانيّة; Al-Quwwat al-Jawwiya As-Sudaniya
- Sudanese Air Force flag and roundel
- Founded: 1956; 70 years ago
- Country: Sudan
- Type: Air force
- Role: Aerial warfare
- Size: 16,000 ~ 18,000 personnel
- Part of: Sudanese Armed Forces
- Equipment: 268 aircraft
- Engagements: First Sudanese Civil War; Second Sudanese Civil War; Darfur War; 2015 intervention in Yemen; Sudanese civil war (2023–present); Battle of Kadugli

Commanders
- Commander of the Air Force: Lieutenant General Ali Ajabna Jamouda Mohamed

Insignia
- Ensign

- Fin flash

- Roundel

Aircraft flown
- Attack: Nanchang Q-5, Su-24, Su-25, K-8 Karakorum
- Bomber: Su-24, Il-76
- Fighter: Shenyang J-6, Chengdu J-7, MiG-21, MiG-23, MiG-29
- Helicopter: Bell 205, Bell 212, Mil Mi-8, Mil Mi-17
- Attack helicopter: Mil Mi-24, Mil Mi-35, Bo-105
- Trainer helicopter: Safat 02, Mi-8, Mi-2
- Utility helicopter: Bo-105, Mi-8, Mi-17
- Interceptor: MiG-29, J-7
- Patrol: An-26, Mi-17, Safat 02
- Trainer: FTC-2000, Hongdu JL-8
- Transport: An-12, An-26, An-30, An-32, C-130, DHC-5, Il-76

The Sudanese Air Force (Arabic: القوّات الجوّيّة السودانيّة, romanized: Al-Quwwat al-Jawwiya As-Sudaniya) is the aerial warfare branch of the Sudanese Armed Forces. It was established in 1956 following Sudan's independence earlier that year, and first saw action in the First Sudanese Civil War.

== History ==
The Sudanese Air Force was founded immediately after Sudan gained independence from the United Kingdom in 1956. The British assisted in the Air Force's establishment, providing equipment and training. Four new Hunting Provost T Mk 51s were delivered for jet training in 1961. In 1958, the Sudanese Air Force's transport wing acquired its first aircraft, a single Hunting President. In 1960 the Sudanese Air Force received an additional four re-furbished RAF Provosts and two more Hunting Presidents. Also in 1960, the transport wing's capability was increased by the addition of two Pembroke C Mk 54s.

The SAF gained its first combat aircraft when 12 Jet Provosts with a close air support capability were delivered in 1962. In the 1960s, the Soviet Union and China began to supply the Sudanese Air Force with aircraft. This included a supply of Shenyang F-5 fighters (F-5/FT-5 variants).

== Air bases ==
- Wadi Seidna Air Base
- Kenana Air Base
- Merowe Air Base
- Osman Digna Air Base
- Al-Nujoumi Air Base
- El Obeid Air Base
- Port Sudan Military Airport
- Khartoum Air Base
- Atbara Air Base
- Nyala Airport
- El Fasher Airport
- Geneina Airport
- Dongola Airport
- Kassala Airport
- Damazin Airport
- Kadugli Airport
- Heglig Airstrip
- Dilling Airport

== Equipment ==
=== Aircraft ===
The air force flies a mixture of transport planes, fighter jets and helicopters which are mainly sourced from the Soviet Union/Russia and China. However, not all the aircraft are in a fully functioning state and the availability of spare parts has been limited. In 1991, the two main air bases were at the capital Khartoum and Wadi Sayyidna near Omdurman.

On 4 April 2001, a Sudanese Antonov An-24 aircraft crashed in Adaril (Adar Yeil, Adar Yale), Sudan. The fifteen dead included a general, seven lieutenant generals, three brigadiers, a colonel, a lieutenant colonel and a corporal.

In 2009, Sudan made a successful deal to buy two different batches of 12 MiG-29 Russian fighter jets each. There were 23 MiG-29s in active service as of late 2008. However, the rebel Justice and Equality Movement claimed to have shot down one MiG-29 with large-caliber machine-gun fire on 10 May 2008, killing the pilot of the plane, a retired Russian Air Force fighter pilot; the Sudanese government denied the allegation. South Sudan also claimed to have shot down a Sudanese MiG-29 during the 2012 border conflict.

In mid-2011, members of the UN Panel of Experts on the Sudan documented the following aircraft in Darfur which potentially indicated violations of United Nations Security Council Resolution 1556:

- Letter dated 24 January 2011 from former members of the Panel of Experts on the Sudan established pursuant to Resolution 1591 (2005) and renewed pursuant to Resolution 1945 (2010) addressed to the Chairman of the Security Council Committee established pursuant to Resolution 1591 (2005) concerning the Sudan, page 30
  - Five Sukhoi Su-25 ground attack aircraft (tail numbers 201, 204, 205, 207, 212)
  - Three Mi-17 transport helicopters (tail numbers 525, 540, 543)
  - Nine Mi-24 attack helicopters (tail numbers 928, 937, 938, 939, 942, 943, 947, 948 stationed at El Fasher and Nyala, and an additional Mi-24 which crashed near El Fasher on 18 April 2011.) Satellite imagery also indicates that a total of five other attack helicopters were present at Kutum, N Darfur, in April 2011, and at El Geneima in February 2011, but panel members have not determined whether they were introduced from outside Darfur in addition to those listed above, or moved from within Darfur.

In August 2013, pictures showed Su-24's in Sudanese colors, reporting that the aircraft were among the ex Belarusian Air Force Su-24's retired in 2012. Various reports have said that the air force uses Iranian drones such as the Ghods Ababil.

=== Current inventory ===
It is difficult to establish the current aircraft inventory of the Sudanese Air Force because of the ongoing civil war and because reliable public open sources detailing the Air Force's inventory are hard to find (if they exist at all). This lack of good sources was a problem even before the current civil war (secrecy concerning Air Force matters has been in place in Sudan for a long time) and the civil war has naturally only made it harder to establish a full and true picture of the state of the Air Force (equipment-wise and otherwise). The table below listing manned aircraft of the Sudanese air force is almost totally based on the World Air Forces 2026 publication by FlightGlobal. There are differing estimates of the state of the Air Force to that of World Air Forces 2026; for example, Sudan War Monitor internet publication, which follows the current civil war, published on 12 January 2026 a writing that says the following of the Sudanese Air Force: "... loss of nearly all the Air Force’s equipment since 2023", "Sudan’s Air Force lost many of its MiG-29 fighter jets on the first day of the war ...", "In the following months, the RSF shot down many of the Air Force’s remaining jets ...", " ... Antonov and Ilyushin cargo planes ... lasted somewhat longer, but sustained losses in 2024-2025, ending a two-year bombing campaign ...", "Since last year, Sudan’s Air Force has lost a substantial proportion of its newly acquired Turkish drone fleet", "... the Ilyushin bombers until they were all shot down". So the state and inventory of the Sudanese Air Force can be described as unknown and uncertain, and will probably remain so at least until the current civil war ends.

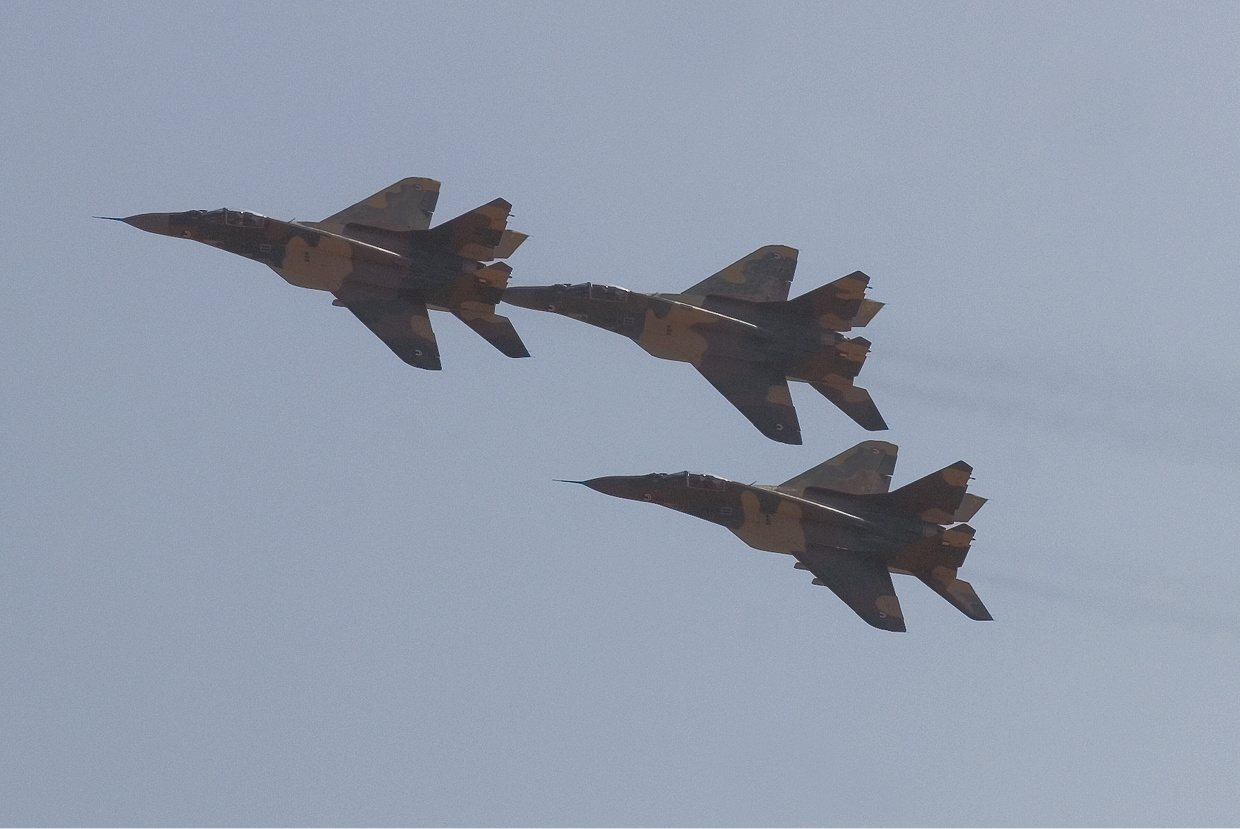
Sudanese Air Force MiG-29

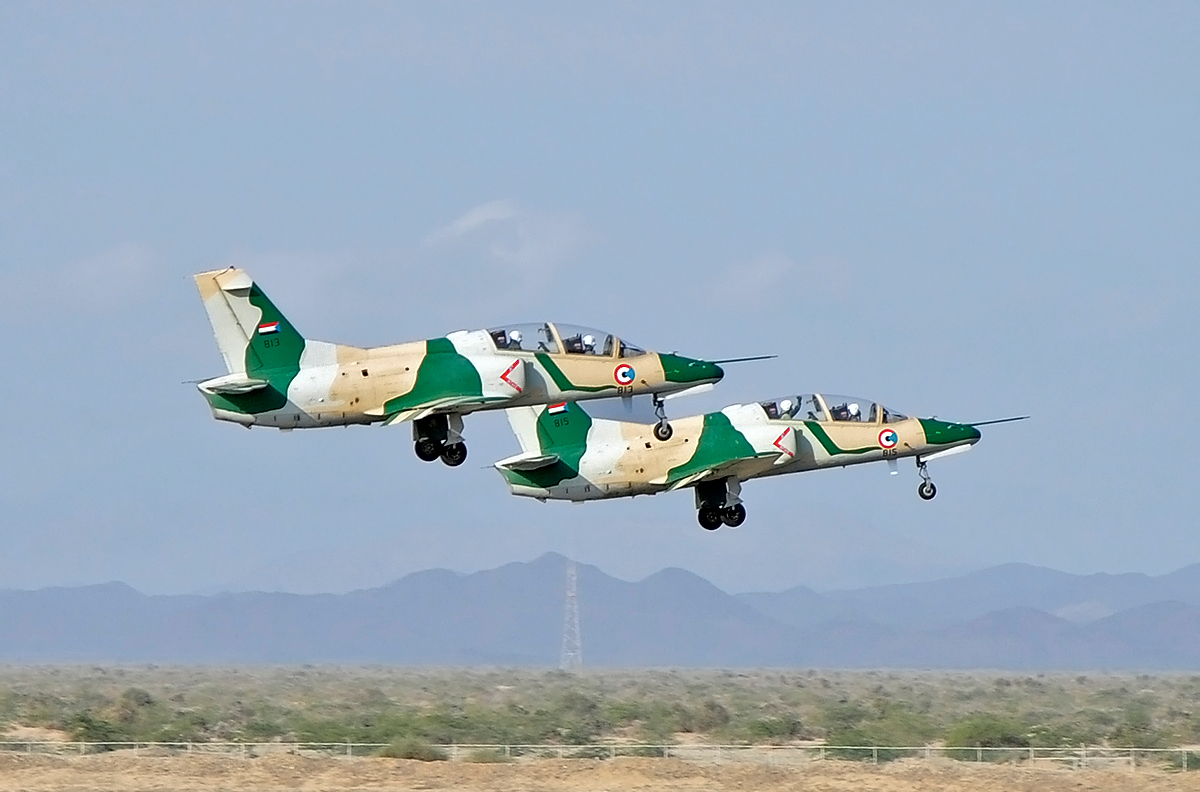
K-8s of the Sudanese Air Force take off from Port Sudan Airport

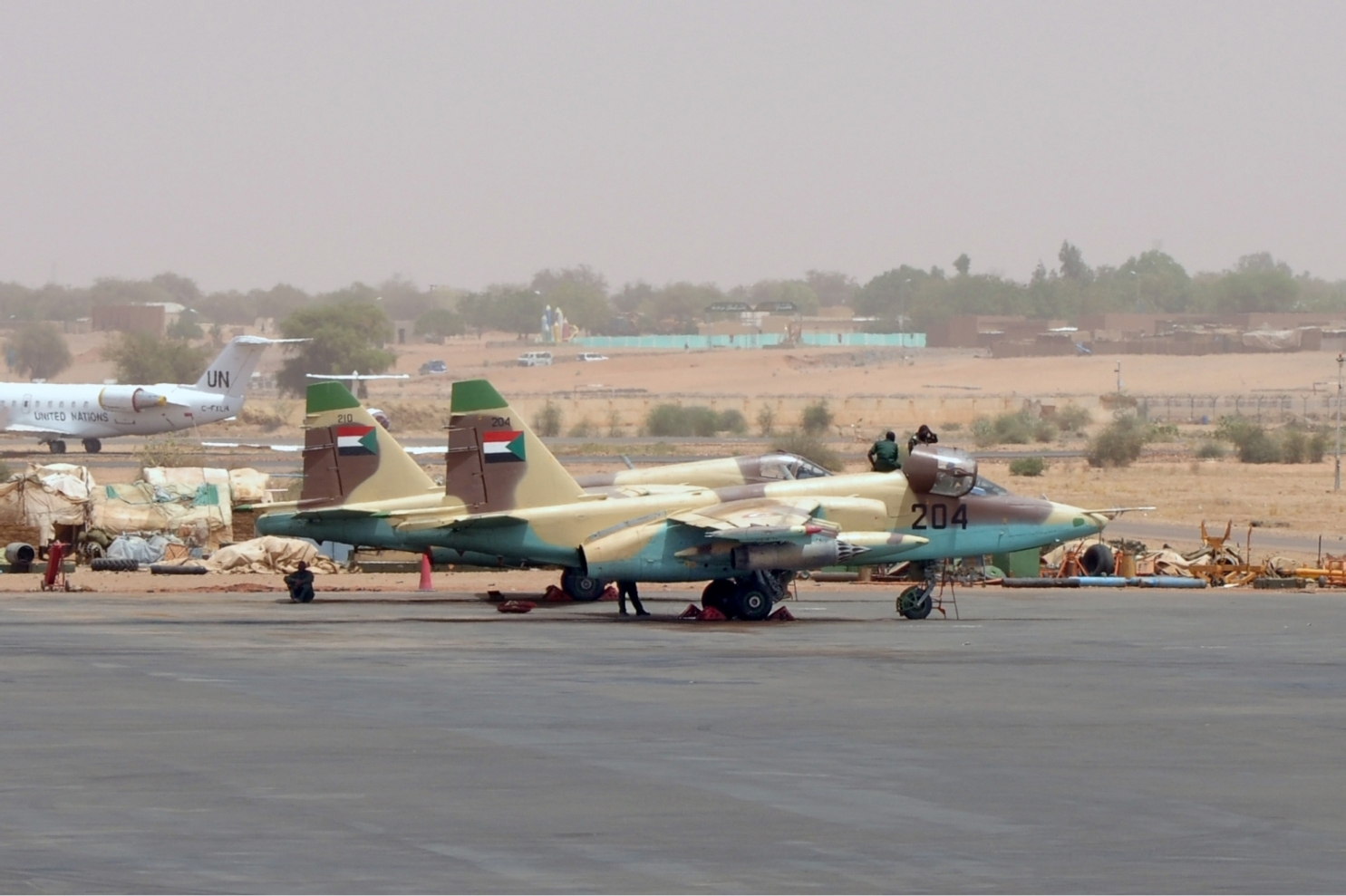
Sudan Air Force Sukhoi Su-25

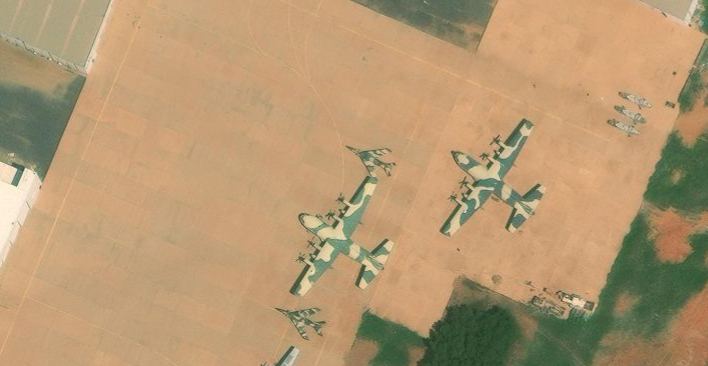
Sudanese C-130 Spotted in Wadi Sayyidna

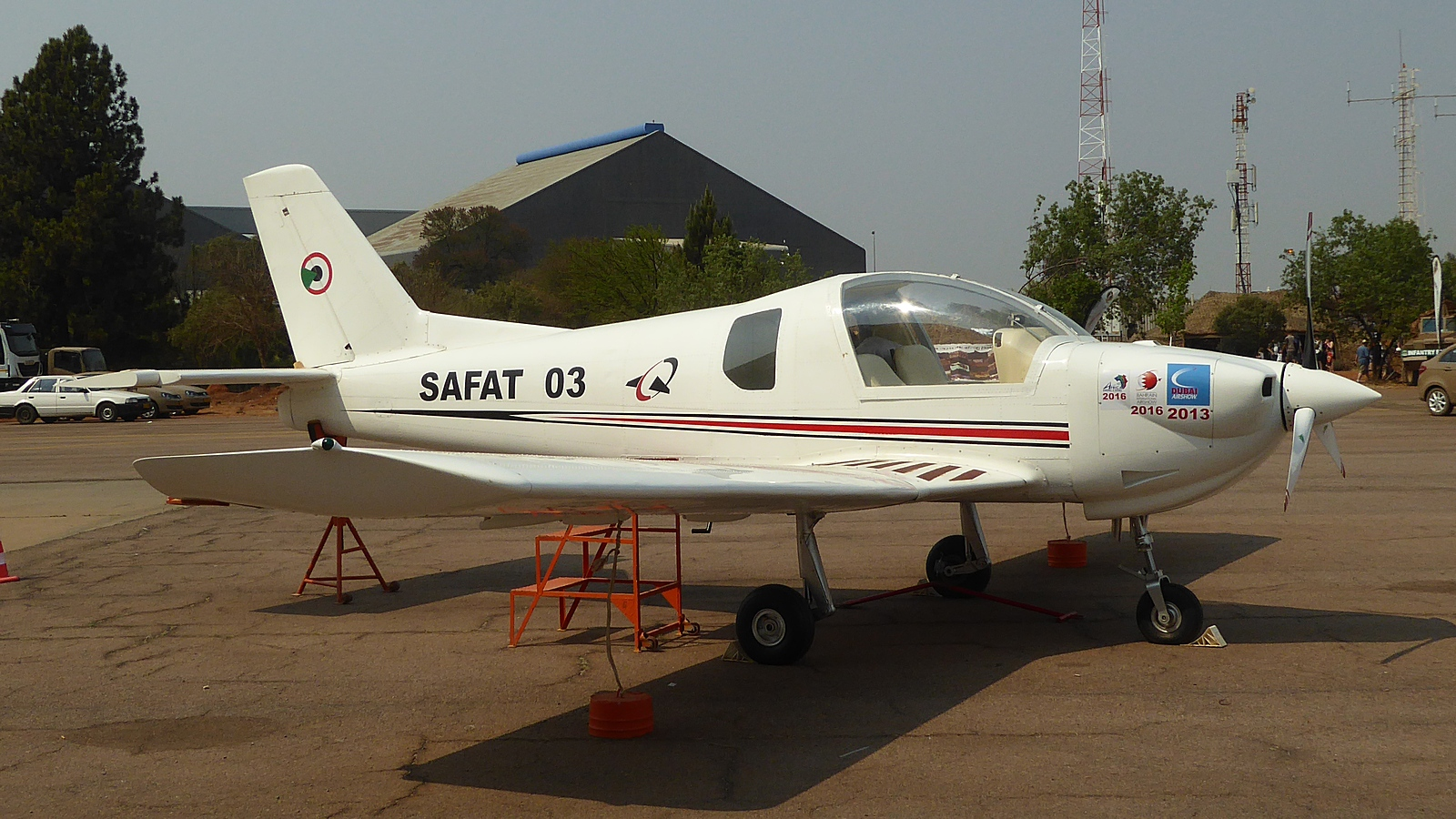
Safat-03 of the Sudanese air force

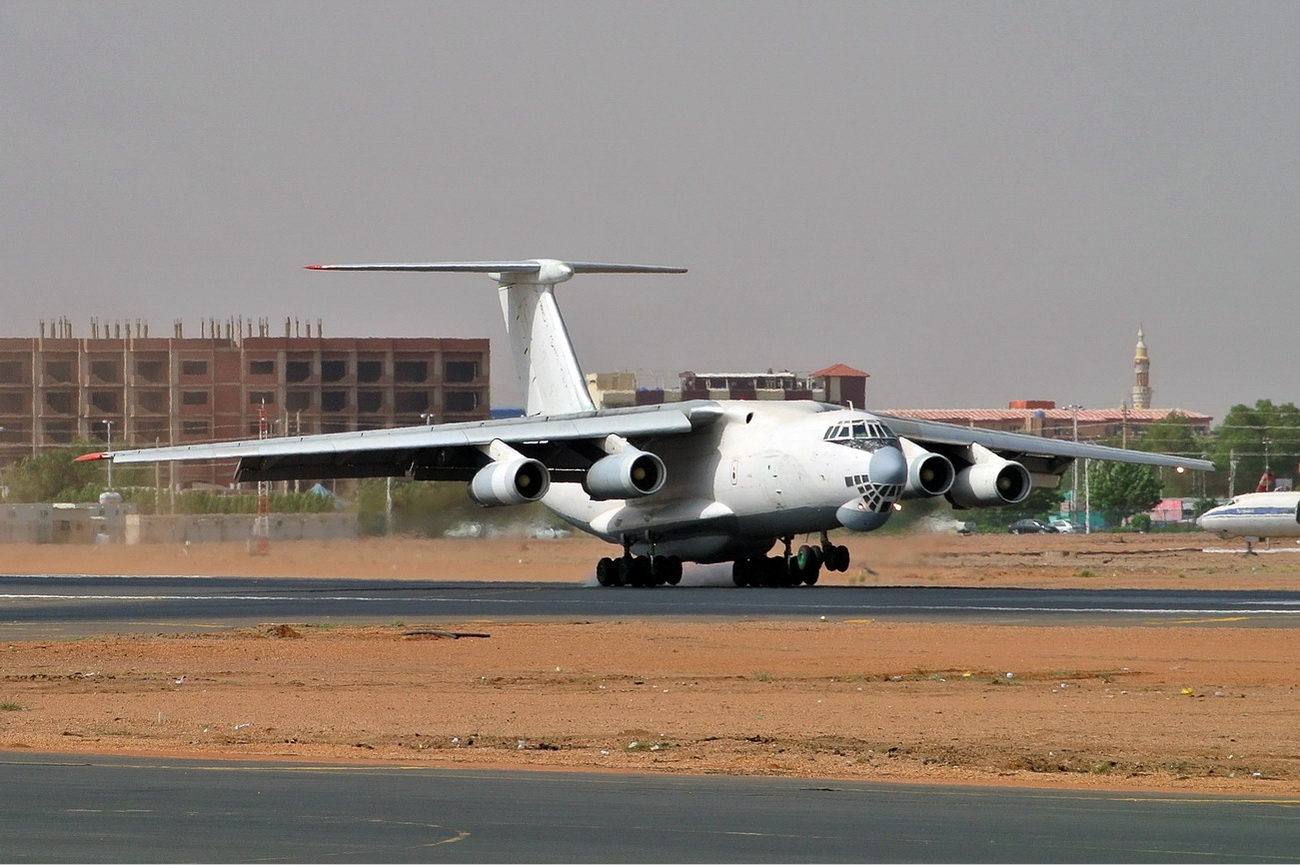
Sudanese Air Force Il-76TD

Aircraft	Origin	Type	Variant	In service	Notes
Combat aircraft
MiG-29	Soviet Union	Multirole fighter jet	MiG-29SE	10	In addition, 1 MiG-29UB is used for conversion training and listed under "Trainer aircraft" in this table (so total Mig-29 inventory is 11).
MiG-23	Soviet Union	Fighter	MiG-23MS	4	3 fighters one trainer
MiG-21	Soviet Union	Fighter	MiG-21M	4 (up to 31 could be reintroduced into service)	4 listed by World Air Forces 2026. 15–31 to be operational again after new engines were bought from Pakistan in August 2025.
Sukhoi Su-25	Soviet Union	Attack	Su-25K	12	In addition, 3 Su-25UB are used for conversion training and listed under "Trainer aircraft" in this table (so total Su-25 inventory is 12)
Sukhoi Su-24	Soviet Union	Attack	Su-24M	7	Delivered from Belarus in 2013
Nanchang Q-5	China	Attack	A-5C	20	
Chengdu J-7	China	Fighter	F-7M	12	
Shenyang J-6	China	Fighter	F-6C	8	
Transport
Antonov An-12	Soviet Union	Transport	An-12BK	5	
Antonov An-26	Soviet Union	Transport	An-26B	1	One crashed in 2025.
Antonov An-30	Soviet Union	Transport	An-30/32	4	
C-130 Hercules	United States	Transport	C-130H	1	A C-130H was destroyed after taxiing on the runway of Wadi Seidna Air Base by a kamikaze drone operated by the Rapid Support Forces in March 2024 during the 2023 Sudanese civil war
DHC-5 Buffalo	Canada	Transport	DHC-5D	1	
Ilyushin Il-76	Soviet Union	Transport	Il-76TD	3	Used for bombing militia positions and transport. On 9 December 2025 an IL-76 crashed. RSF shot down one IL-76 on 4 November 2025.
Helicopters
Mil Mi-24	Russia	Attack	Mi-35	35	
Mil Mi-8	Soviet Union	Utility/Attack	Mi-8/17/171	24	
Bo 105	Germany	Attack	Bo 105	20	
IAR 330	Romania	Utility	IAR 330L	16	
Mil Mi-2	Soviet Union	Utility	Mi-2	6	
Bell 205	United States	Utility	Bell 205	2	
Bell 212	United States	Utility	Bell 212	3	
Trainer aircraft
Guizhou JL-9	China	Jet trainer	FTC-2000	6	
Hongdu JL-8 / K-8 Karakorum	China / Pakistan	Jet trainer / Light attack	K-8E / K-8S	23~33	10 K-8 Karakorum from Pakistan ordered in August 2025, these may (or may not) be included in the 23
MiG-29	Soviet Union	Multirole fighter jet	MiG-29UB	1	In addition, 10 MiG-29SE are used as combat aircraft and listed under "Combat aircraft" in this table (so total Mig-29 inventory is 11)
Sukhoi Su-25	Soviet Union	Attack	Su-25UB	3	In addition, 9 Su-25K are used as combat aircraft and listed under "Combat aircraft" in this table (so total Su-25 inventory is 12)
Safat 01	Sudan	Trainer	Safat-1	11	locally manufactured, design inspired by the Piper PA-18
Safat 02	Sudan	Trainer	Safat-2	20	locally assembled AK1-3
Safat 03	Sudan	Trainer	Safat-3	6~12	Sudanese locally manufactured Variant of the Utva-75
CJ-6	China	Trainer	PT-6	17~20	Used mainly by the High Level Aviation Academy of Sudan
Super Mushshak	Pakistan	Trainer	MFI-395	unknown	From Pakistan ordered in August 2025
Presidential aircraft
Antonov An-72/An-74	Soviet Union	Presidential transport	An-74/72	2	One An-72 and one An-74 were destroyed in the ongoing civil war
Dassault Falcon 50	France	Presidential	50	2	
Dassault Falcon 20F	France	Presidential	20F	1	
Airbus A320-200	France	Presidential	200	1	Leased from Etihad

Aircraft	Origin	Type	Variant	In service	Notes
UAV
Mohajer-6	Iran	UCAV			
DJI Mavic	Sudan / Ukraine	Loitering munition			Manufactured locally
Shahpar-2	Pakistan	UCAV			
Safaroog	Sudan	Loitering munition			Manufactured locally
YIHA-III	Pakistan	reconnaissance/loitering muntion			
MR-10K	Pakistan	reconnaissance			
Ababel-5	Sudan	kamikaze			Manufactured locally
HESA Ababil	Iran	UCAV			Manufactured locally
Zagil-3M	Sudan	UCAV			Manufactured locally
Kamin-25	Sudan	Loitering munition			Manufactured locally (launched from Zagil-3M)
CASC Rainbow	China	UCAV			
CAIG Wing Loong II	China	UCAV			
Bayraktar TB2	Turkey	UCAV			
Baykar Bayraktar Akıncı	Turkey				
FH-97 (Feihong)	China	UCAV			Captured from UAE-supplied RSF

==== Retired ====
Previous notable aircraft operated were the BAC Jet Provost T55, Douglas C-47, Northrop F-5E/F Tiger II, BAC 167 Strikemaster Mk.90, Shaanxi Y-8, Antonov An-2, Fokker F27 Friendship, Pilatus PC-6 Porter, Shenyang J-2, MBB Bo 105CB-2, and Mil Mi-4.

=== Missiles ===
Missile	Origin	Type	Variant	In service	Notes
AAM
R-77	Russia	air-to-air BVR missile	R-77	N/A	
R-73 (missile)	Russia	Short-range air-to-air missile	R-73 (missile)	N/A	
R-27 (missile)	Russia	air-to-air BVR missile	R-27 (missile)	N/A	
K-13 (missile)	Russia	Short-range air-to-air missile	K-13 (missile)	N/A	
PL-8 (missile)	China	Short-range air-to-air missile	PL-8 (missile)	40	

=== Air defense ===
Weapon	Origin	Type	Variant	In service	Notes
HQ-9	China	SAM system	HQ-9	Unknown	
HQ-6	China	SAM system	HQ-6	Unknown	
WS-1	China	MLRS	WS-1B	Unknown	
WS-2	China	MLRS	WS-2	Unknown	
PHL-03	China	MLRS	PHL-03	Unknown	
HİSAR-A	Turkey	SAM system	HİSAR-A	Unknown	
ZPU	Soviet Union	Anti-aircraft gun	ZPU	+3200	ZPU/1/2/4/23
AZP S-60	Soviet Union	Autocannon	S-60	+100	Both S-60 and Type 59 versions
KS-19	Soviet Union	Anti-aircraft gun	KS-19	+40	Status unknown
M163 VADS	United States	Self-propelled anti-aircraft gun	M163	+8	
9K32 Strela-2	Soviet Union	Man portable surface-to-air missile launcher	SA-7	+400	
FN-6	China	Man portable surface-to-air missile launcher	FN-6	+200	
FIM-43 Redeye	United States	Manportable surface-to-air missile	FIM-43	+125	
QW-2	China	Man portable surface-to-air missile launcher	QW-2	+200	Sudan operates QW-1/2
Akash	India	SAM system	Mk 1	N/A	
SA-2 Guideline	Soviet Union	Strategic SAM system	SA-2	+90 Launchers	Sudan has operated the S-75 and the Chinese HQ-2 since 1970.
9K33 OSA	Soviet Union	SAM system	SA-8	Unknown	
HQ-64	China	SAM system	HQ-6	Unknown	
HQ-16	China	Surface-to-air missile	HQ-16	Unknown	

== Accidents and incidents ==
- 26 February 1996: A Lockheed C-130H Hercules of the Sudanese Air Force crashed. The aircraft was destroyed and 91 occupants died.
- 12 February 1998: An Antonov An-32B of the Sudanese Air Force crashed. The aircraft was destroyed and 26 people died. Among the victims were several government officials and First Vice President al-Zubair Muhammad Saleh.
- 3 June 1999: An Antonov An-32 of the Sudanese Air Force crashed. The aircraft was destroyed and 50 occupants died.
- 4 April 2001: An Antonov An-26 of the Sudanese Air Force crashed, killing Sudan's deputy defense minister and 13 high-ranking military officers. The aircraft was destroyed.
- 25 July 2005: A Mil Mi-17 of the Sudanese Air Force crashed. Aircraft destroyed, 19 persons killed.
- 11 February 2006: An Antonov An-26 of the Sudanese Air Force crashed into a building. The aircraft was destroyed and 20 people died.
- 7 October 2012: An Antonov An-12BP of the Sudanese Air Force, leased for AZZA Transport, crashed. The aircraft was destroyed, 15 people were killed.
- 2 January 2020: An Antonov An-12A of the Sudanese Air Force crashed. The aircraft was destroyed, 18 people died.
- 25 February 2025: An Antonov An-26 of the Sudanese Air Force crashed. The aircraft was destroyed and 46 people died, at least 10 were injured.

== Bibliography ==
- Silvester, John. "Call to Arms: The Percival Sea Prince and Pembroke". Air Enthusiast, No. 55, Autumn 1994, pp. 56–61. ISSN 0143-5450
