= Carthago Airport =

- IATA: none; ICAO: HSCG

Summary
- Location: Carthago, Sudan
- Elevation AMSL: 3,230 ft (980 m)
- Coordinates: 18°45′05″N 36°59′30″E

Map
- Location within Sudan

Runways
| Direction | Length | | Surface |
| Direction | m | ft | Surface |
|---|---|---|---|
| 10/28 | 1,695 | 5,561 | sand |
| 06/24 | 1,000 | 3,281 | sand |

Carthago Airport (ICAO: HSCG) is an airport serving Carthago, located in the Red Sea state in Sudan.

It has two faintly marked sand runways.
