= Homology-derived Secondary Structure of Proteins =

HSSP (Homology-derived Secondary Structure of Proteins) is a database that combines structural and sequence information about proteins. This database has the information of the alignment of all available homologs of proteins from the PDB database As a result of this, HSSP is also a database of homology-based implied protein structures.

== See also ==
- Protein Data Bank (PDB)
- STING
