= Damazin Airport =

- IATA: RSS; ICAO: HSDZ

Summary
- Airport type: Public / Military
- Operator: Government
- Location: Damazin, Sudan
- Elevation AMSL: 1,584 ft (483 m)
- Coordinates: 11°47′09″N 034°20′11″E

Map
- Location within Sudan

Runways
Direction	Length		Surface
Direction	m	ft	Surface
17/35	2,500	8,202	Asphalt

Damazin Airport (IATA: RSS, ICAO: HSDZ) is an airport serving Damazin, located in the Blue Nile state in Sudan.

== Facilities ==
The airport resides at an elevation of 1,582 feet (482 m) above mean sea level. It has one runway designated 17/35 with an asphalt surface measuring 2,500 by 45 metres (8,202 ft × 148 ft).

== Airlines and destinations ==
Airlines	Destinations
Badr Airlines	Khartoum (suspended)

== Damazin Air Base ==
The airport hosts Sudanese Air Force Helicopter Squadron operating transport helicopters and attack helicopters:

- Mil Mi-8
- Mil Mi-24
- Mil Mi-35
