= Carthago, Sudan =

Carthago كارثاغو
- Location in Sudan
- Coordinates: 18°47′N 36°58′E
- Country: Sudan
- State: Red Sea
- Time zone: UTC+3 (EAT)

Carthago (Arabic: كارثاغو) is a town in northeastern Sudan. It is located in the country's Red Sea state.

== Transport ==
The town is served by Carthago Airport.

== See also ==
- Irgun and Lehi internment in Africa
