= Port Sudan Military Airport =

Airport in Sudan

- IATA: none; ICAO: HSSP

Summary
- Airport type: Military
- Serves: Port Sudan, Sudan
- Elevation AMSL: 21 ft (6.4 m)
- Coordinates: 19°34′39″N 037°12′57″E

Map
- Location of airport in Sudan (Northern state highlighted)

Runways
Direction	Length		Surface
Direction	m	ft	Surface
18/36	2,000	6,562	Asphalt

Port Sudan Military Airport is an airport located within Port Sudan.

The airport was once a civilian airfield and replaced by Port Sudan New International Airport opened in 1992. The new airport has assumed the ICAO airport code HSSP replacing HSPN.

== Port Sudan Air Base ==
It currently hosts Sudanese Air Force Flight School (Aeronautics College) using a number of trainer aircraft not found in the active inventory of the SAF:

- PT-6? - one lost to crash in 2017
- SAFAT-03 - a local and modified variant of the UTVA 75 built at SAFAT Aviation Complex at Wadi Seidna Air Base
- Yak-52
