= Khartoum International Airport =

International airport serving Khartoum, Sudan

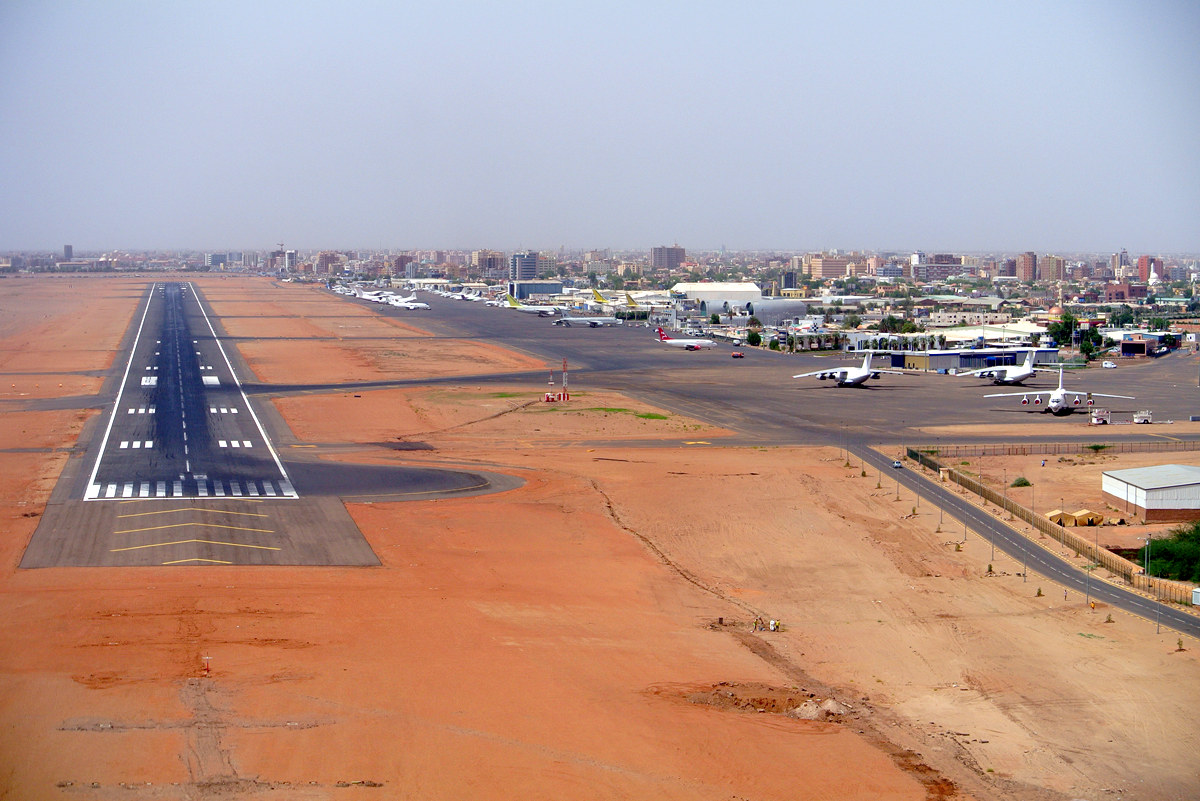
- IATA: KRT; ICAO: HSSK

Summary
- Airport type: Civil and Military (Joint)
- Serves: Khartoum
- Location: Khartoum, Sudan
- Hub for: Badr Airlines Sudan Airways Tarco Aviation
- Elevation AMSL: 1,265 ft (386 m)
- Coordinates: 15°35′22″N 32°33′11″E
- Website: krtairport.gov.sd

Map
- Location of airport in Sudan

Runways
Direction	Length		Surface
Direction	m	ft	Surface
18/36	2,980	9,777	Asphalt

Statistics (2017)
- Passengers: 3,563,181
- Source: Khartoum International Airport

Khartoum International Airport (IATA: KRT, ICAO: HSSK) (Arabic: مطار الخرطوم الدولي) is an international airport serving Khartoum, the capital of Sudan. The airport was shut down from 15 April 2023 to 25 March 2025 at the Battle of Khartoum during the Sudanese civil war.

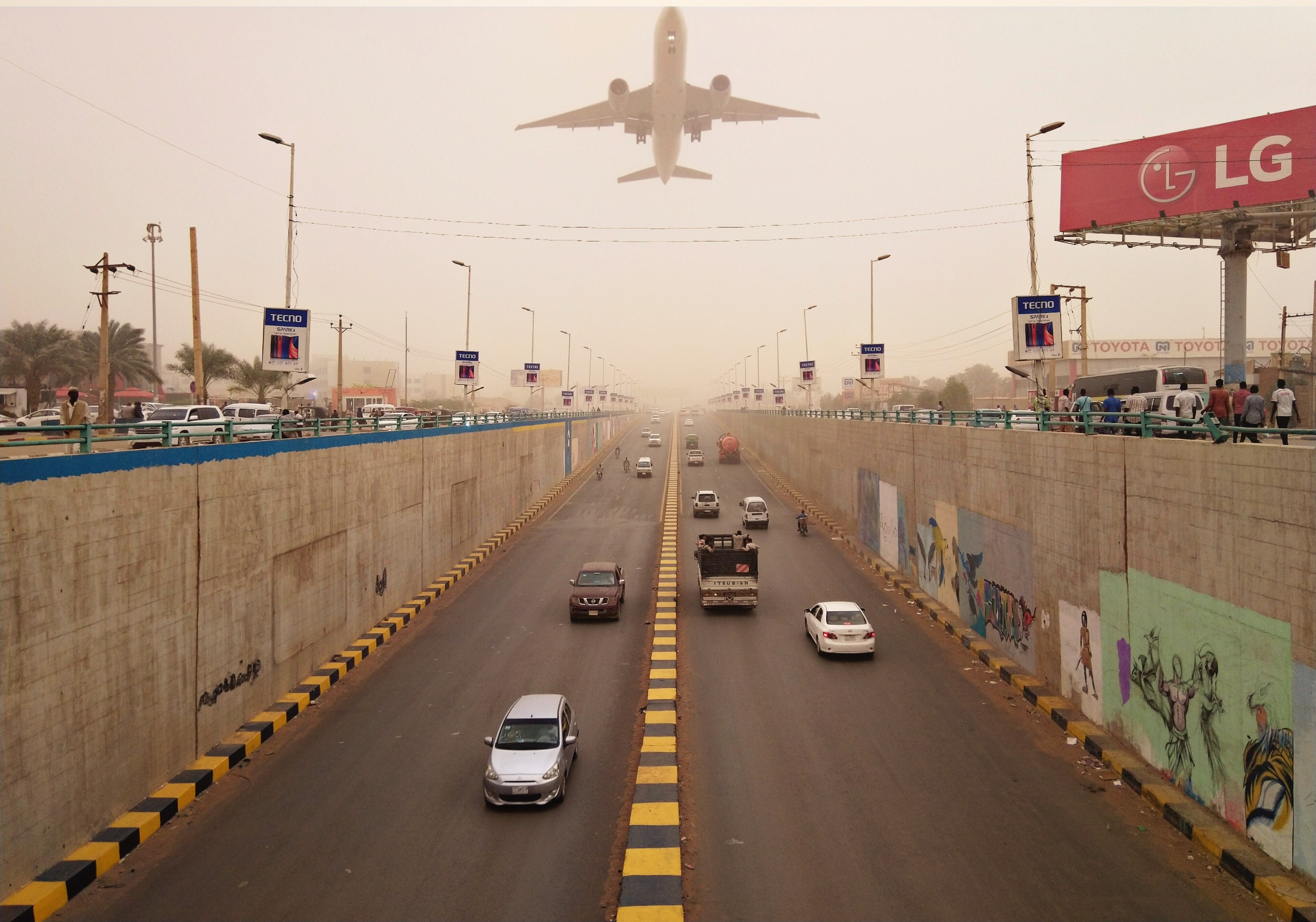
Access Road

== History ==
The airport originated as the Royal Air Force airfield Gordon's Tree. By January 1940, No. 223 Squadron RAF was located at Gordon's Tree, in the south of Khartoum. Later the area became known as El Shajjara ("The Tree"). By January 1942, No. 71 Operational Training Unit (OTU) RAF was operating from the airfield; among aircraft operated were Curtiss Tomahawks and Vickers Wellesleys. Reportedly the OTU had at one stage 50 Harvards and 20 Hurricane fighters on strength.

Sudanese independence was granted on 1 January 1956. The last Royal Air Force flying unit reported at Khartoum was No. 8 Squadron RAF, which arrived in November 1953, and stayed until July 1956.

The current airport is scheduled to be replaced by the New Khartoum International Airport in Omdourman 40 kilometres (25 mi) south of the centre of Khartoum. This is planned to have two 4,000 metres (13,000 ft) runways, a passenger terminal of 86,000 m^{2} (930,000 sq ft) and a 300-room international hotel. Construction is to be carried out by China Harbour Engineering Co. (CHEC). On 4 March 2021, the airport's ICAO code was changed from HSSS to HSSK.

At the start of the Sudanese civil war (2023–present) on 15 April 2023, the Rapid Support Forces (RSF) attacked key installations in Khartoum, including Khartoum International Airport. The RSF reportedly fired on a Saudia airliner which was arriving at the airport, but no casualties were reported among the aircraft's passengers and crew. However, two civilians were killed in separate incidents in the airport. A total of 20 aircraft were believed to have been destroyed during the fighting. The RSF subsequently occupied the airport, which was closed to aviation and subjected to attacks by the Sudanese Armed Forces (SAF) during the Battle of Khartoum. The SAF regained control of the airport on 26 March 2025. The airport reopened for domestic flights on 22 October 2025 when Badr Airlines resumed flights between Port Sudan and Khartoum. International flights resumed on 28 April 2026 with the arrival of a Kuwait Airways flight.

On 4 May 2026, another drone attack was carried out on the airport, which the SAF blamed on Ethiopia and the United Arab Emirates.

== Airlines and destinations ==
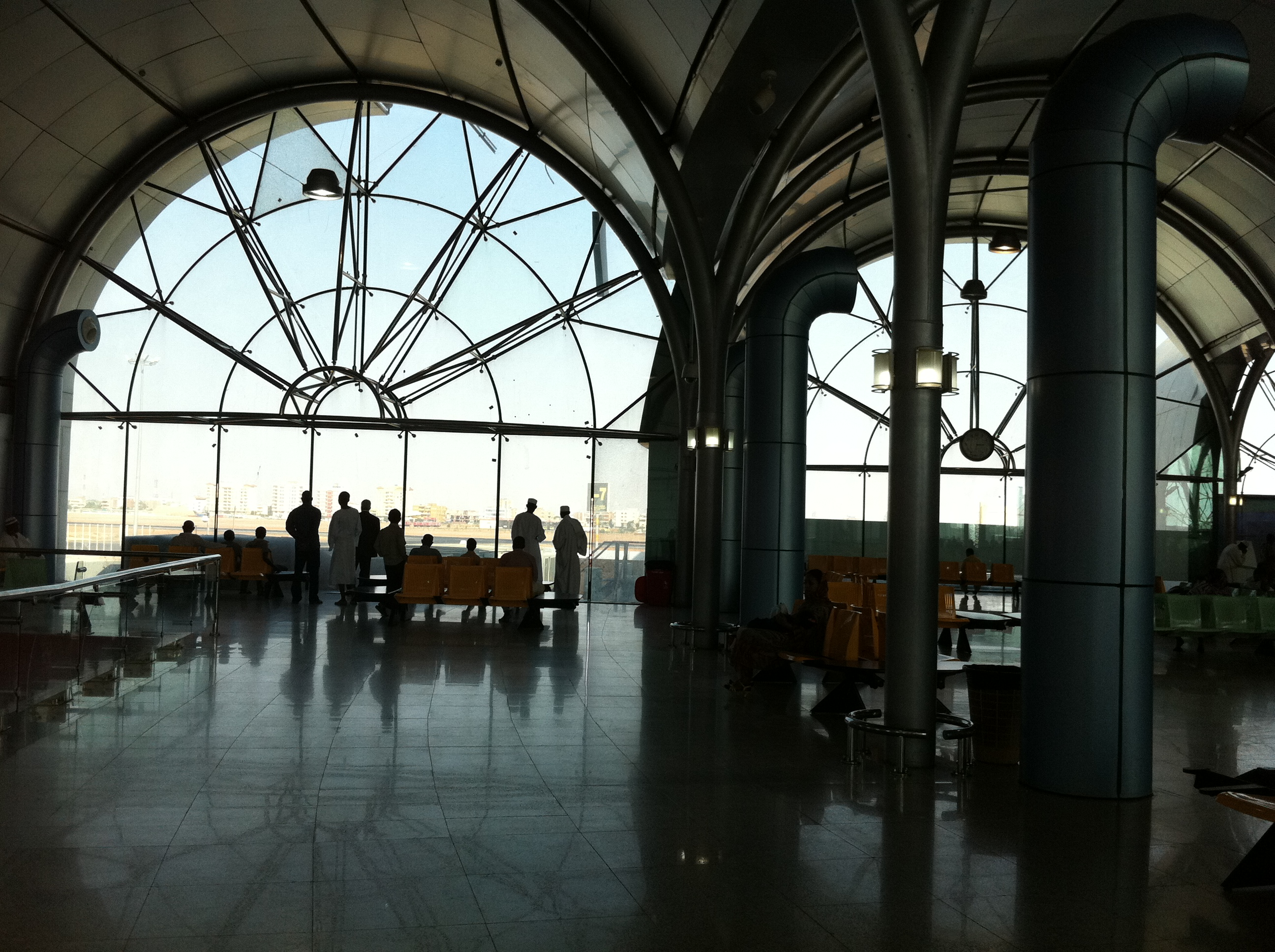
Departure Hall in 2010

=== Passenger ===
Airlines	Destinations
Badr Airlines	Abu Dhabi, Addis Ababa, Amman–Queen Alia, Cairo, Damazin, Doha, Dubai–International, El Fasher, El Obeid, Geneina, Istanbul, Jeddah, Juba, Kano, Kassala, N'Djamena, Nyala, Port Sudan, Riyadh, Wau
Sudan Airways	Addis Ababa, Asmara, Cairo, El Fasher, Geneina, Jeddah, Juba, Kano, N'Djamena, Nyala, Port Sudan, Riyadh
Tarco Aviation	Amman–Queen Alia, Asmara, Cairo, Dammam, Doha, Entebbe, Jeddah, Juba, Kano, N'Djamena, Riyadh

=== Cargo ===
Airlines	Destinations
EgyptAir Cargo	Cairo, Nairobi–Jomo Kenyatta
Emirates Sky Cargo	Dubai–Al Maktoum
Ethiopian Airlines Cargo	Addis Ababa, Liège
Qatar Airways Cargo	Doha
SalamAir	Muscat
Saudia Cargo	Jeddah
Turkish Cargo	Istanbul, Nairobi–Jomo Kenyatta

== Khartoum Air Base ==
The airport hosts a major Sudanese Air Force Transport Squadron:

- Antonov An-12
- Antonov An-26
- Antonov An-30
- Antonov An-32
- Antonov An-72/74
- Lockheed C-130H
- Ilyushin Il-62M - personnel transport
- Ilyushin Il-76TD strategic transport
- Dassault Falcon 50 VIP transport
- Dassault Falcon 900 VIP transport

Police Air Wing operates rotary aircraft from the base:

- Mil Mi-8
- Mil Mi-17
- SAFAT-02

== Accidents and incidents ==
- On 1 January 1942, Vickers Wellesley Mark I L2660 of No. 71 Operational Training Unit RAF was written off, damaged beyond repair, on take-off from Gordon's Tree.
- On 27 August 1952, Vickers Viscount G-AHRF operated by the Ministry of Supply (United Kingdom) was damaged beyond economic repair when its starboard undercarriage collapsed on landing.
- On 19 July 1983, Douglas C-47A N480F of Chevron Oil crashed shortly after take-off from Khartoum International Airport on a non-scheduled passenger flight. Both engines had failed, probably due to contaminated fuel. All 27 people on board survived.
- Sudan Airways Flight 109: On 10 June 2008, an aircraft operating from Amman, Jordan, landed and went off the end of the runway. The right engine then caught fire and the fire spread rapidly. Preliminary reports stated that around 100 of the 200 passengers had been killed but this was revised to 30 dead with 184 survivors.
- On 30 June 2008, an Ilyushin Il-76 exploded into a fireball on take-off. All 4 crew were killed.
- On 3 October 2018, a Sudan Air Force Antonov An-32 collided with another Sudan Air Force Antonov An-30.
- On 15 April 2023, during the Battle of Khartoum between government forces and the Rapid Support Forces (RSF) in the Sudanese civil war (2023–present), several airliners, including a Saudia Airbus A330 Regional (HZ-AQ30) and a SkyUp Airlines Boeing 737-800 were destroyed in the fighting. There were no known casualties from both planes. The RSF occupied the airport from 15 April 2023 until 25 March 2025.
- On 21 October 2025 from 4am to 6am, a drone attack was carried out near the airport, a day before reopening.
- On 22 October 2025, another drone attack was carried out on the airport. Despite this, the airport reopened later that day for the first time since the start of the civil war.
- On 23 October 2025, another drone attack was carried out on the airport.
- On 4 May 2026, another drone attack was carried out on the airport. Sudan accused Ethiopia and the United Arab Emirates of being responsible.
