= Tarco Aviation =

Sudanese private airline

IATA	ICAO	Call sign
3T	TQQ	TARCO
- Founded: 2009
- AOC #: 062
- Hubs: Port Sudan New International Airport
- Fleet size: 4
- Destinations: 11
- Headquarters: Port Sudan, Sudan
- Key people: Gasim Al-Khalig, Saad Babikir
- Website: www.tarcoaviation.com

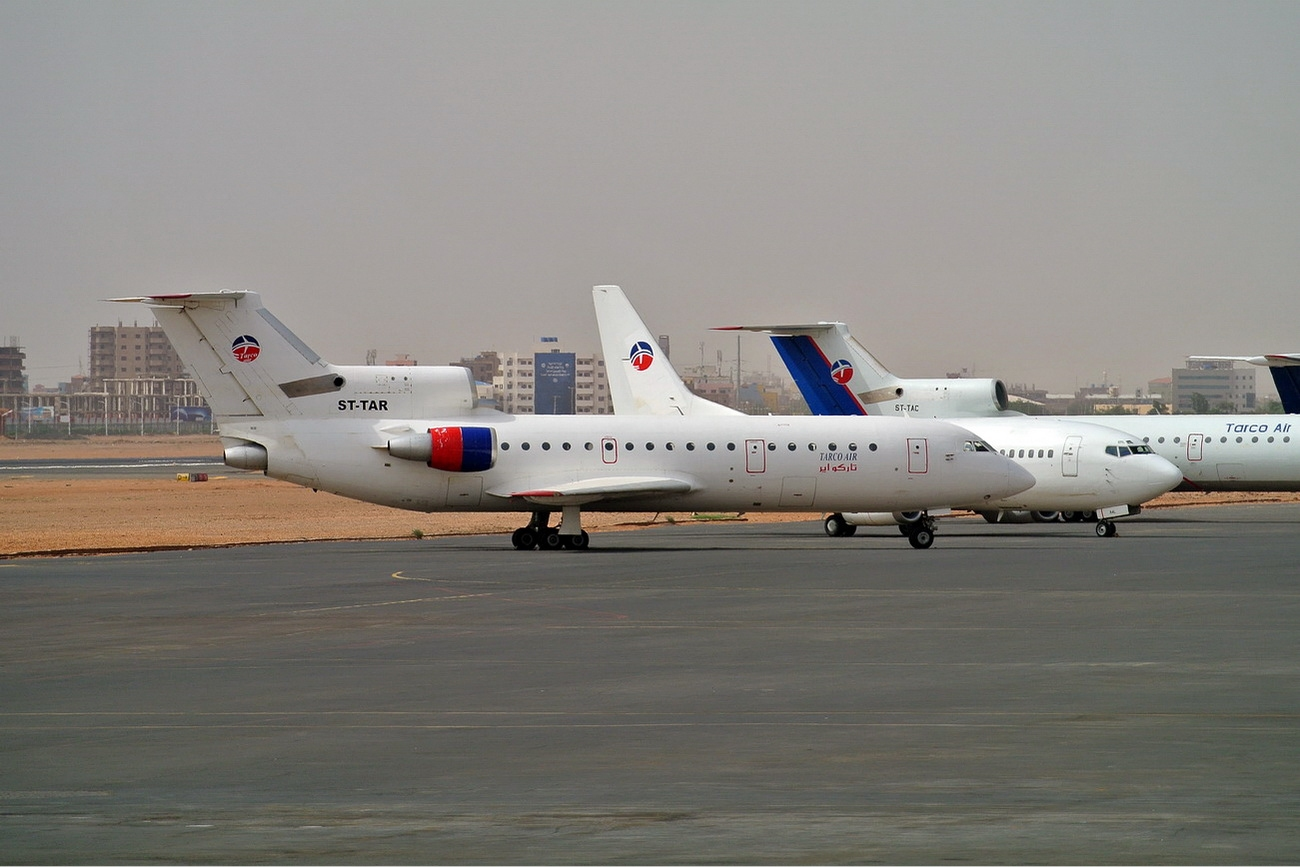
A Tarco Air Yakovlev Yak-42D

Tarco Aviation (formerly Tarco Air) is a private airline established in 2009 in Sudan. Initially based in Khartoum, it has since moved its operations to Port Sudan due to the ongoing 2023 Sudanese civil war.

The airline is banned from European Union airspace as it does not fulfill international safety standards.

== History ==
In December 2018 the company changed its name from Tarco Air to Tarco Aviation.

== Destinations ==
As of November 2026, Tarco Aviation served the following destinations:

Country	City	Airport	Notes	Ref
Eritrea	Asmara	Asmara International Airport		
Egypt	Cairo	Cairo International Airport		
Kuwait	Kuwait City	Kuwait International Airport		
Qatar	Doha	Hamad International Airport		
Saudi Arabia	Dammam	King Fahd International Airport		
Saudi Arabia	Jeddah	King Abdulaziz International Airport		
Saudi Arabia	Riyadh	King Khalid International Airport		
Sudan	Dongola	Dongola Airport		
Sudan	Khartoum	Khartoum International Airport		
Sudan	Port Sudan	Port Sudan New International Airport	Hub	
South Sudan	Juba	Juba International Airport		
Uganda	Entebbe	Entebbe International Airport		

== Fleet ==
=== Current fleet ===
As of August 2025, Tarco Aviation operates the following aircraft:

Tarco Aviation fleet
Aircraft	In service	Parked
Boeing 737-300	2	
Boeing 737-800	2	
Total	4	

=== Former fleet ===
The airline previously operated the following aircraft:

- 2 Boeing 737-400
- 1 Boeing 737-500
- 1 Embraer ERJ 145

== Accidents and incidents ==
- On 11 November 2010 an Antonov An-24 operating a passenger flight from Khartoum to Zalingei Airport, Sudan crashed on landing and burst into flames on the runway. The official report stated that two passengers died; however, there were reports ranging from 1 to 6 fatalities.
