= Wadi Seidna Air Base =

Military airport in Khartoum, Sudan

- قاعدة وادي سيّدنا
- Omdurman, Khartoum, Sudan

Site information
- Type: Military base
- Owner: Government of Sudan

Location
- Location of the airport in Sudan
- Coordinates: 15°49′00″N 32°30′55″E

Garrison information
- Current commander: Lieutenant General Yasser al-Atta

Airfield information
- Identifiers: ICAO: HSWS
Runways
Direction	Length and surface
	Asphalt
- Source: Google Maps, FallingRain

Wadi Seidna Air Base (ICAO: HSWS) (Arabic: قاعدة وادي سيّدنا, romanized: wadi sayyidna) is a military airport 22 kilometres (14 mi) north of Khartoum in Sudan.

The air base runway is in the desert 1.5 kilometres (1 mi) west of the Nile River. The Khartoum VOR-DME (Ident: KTM) is located 15.2 nautical miles (28 km) south of the air base. The air base is under the operational control of the Sudanese Air Force.

== History ==
=== World War II ===
The air base's history goes back to World War II. The U.S. Army Air Forces' 46th Ferrying Squadron, Air Transport Command, was activated at the base on 2 December 1942. The squadron was assigned to the 13th Ferrying Group which was responsible for a region spanning El Geneine, Anglo-Egyptian Sudan, now in West Darfur, to Karachi, British India (now Pakistan), and from Cairo, Egypt, to Tehran, Iran. The squadron was responsible for the aerial transportation of personnel, supplies and mail throughout this area.

Several articles (March-June 2015) by RAF service members during WW2 can be found; one account refers to the capture of two civilian Italian transport aircraft when war with Italy began - as they shared the airfield.

Two sources give different details about the stay of No. 114 Maintenance Unit RAF at Wadi Seidna. National Archives say that No. 114 Maintenance Unit was formed at Wadi Seidna in April 1942 but then disbanded in February 1943.

There are indications that the field was used at times during the war and afterwards for 'Tropical Trials' of RAF aircraft.

On 7 May 1944, No 115 (Transport) Wing RAF was established at the station by redesignating No 2 (Middle East) Ferry Control within No. 216 Group RAF. By 1946, the field was no longer in use.

=== 2023 Sudanese civil war ===
During the opening stages of the Sudanese civil war (2023–present), the base became a hub of evacuation efforts for foreign citizens, which led to the facility being used for landing and takeoff by foreign militaries as well as a gathering point for foreign evacuees and their dependents. The French Special Forces, the U.K. Royal Air Force, the German Luftwaffe, the Royal Netherlands Air Force and the Spanish Air and Space Force began evacuating civilians through the airbase.

From the night of April 22-23, 2023, an airlift was set up by the French army during Operation Sagittaire. A C-130 Hercules arriving from Djibouti landed with night vision binoculars in the air base; the French commandos on board secured the base after negotiations with the Sudanese military. Three A400M Atlas also followed from Djibouti and evacuated French and foreign nationals.

As part of the evacuation of British nationals from Sudan, elements of the British Armed Forces arrived at the airfield, with agreement of the Sudanese government, to conduct an airlift evacuation using RAF Boeing C-17 Globemaster III, Lockheed C-130 Hercules and Airbus A400M Atlas aircraft. The Spanish, Dutch and German air forces also deployed transport planes for their nationals. However, senior German officials accused the British of causing delays in rescue efforts, telling the BBC that British forces landed without the Sudanese Armed Forces's permission at the airbase, which angered the SAF that they refused access to the facility. According to one source, the British had to pay the SAF to allow them access, which resulted in at least half a day's delay for German rescuers. The UK Ministry of Defence denied these reports, calling them "complete nonsense".

On 21 May 2023, residents in Khartoum said heavy fighting occurred as the Rapid Support Forces tried to advance towards the airbase. RSF fighters in about 20 trucks positioned east of the Nile were trying to cross a bridge to reach the airfield, but were met by heavy artillery from the SAF.

== Accidents and incidents ==
- On 21 March 2024, a Sudanese Air Force Lockheed C-130H Hercules was destroyed by a kamikaze drone operated by the Rapid Support Forces as the aircraft was taxiing on the runway.
- On 25 February 2025, a Sudanese Air Force Antonov An-26 transport aircraft crashed in Omdurman after takeoff from the base, killing at least 46 people including Major General Bahr Ahmed, a senior commander in Khartoum.

== See also ==
- Transport in Sudan
- List of airports in Sudan
