= Geneina Airport =

Airport in Darfur, Sudan

- IATA: EGN; ICAO: HSGN

Summary
- Airport type: Public / Military
- Serves: Geneina, Sudan
- Elevation AMSL: 808 m (2,651 ft)
- Coordinates: 13°29′00″N 022°28′00″E

Map
- Location of the airport in Sudan

Runways
Direction	Length		Surface
Direction	m	ft	Surface
12/30	1,880	6,168	Gravel
04/22	1,880	6,168	Gravel
- Sources: GCM, STV

Geneina Airport (IATA: EGN, ICAO: HSGN) is an airport serving Geneina, in the Darfur region of Sudan.

== History ==
During World War II in 1942, Royal Air Force station El Geneina was established as a technical stop on the West African Reinforcement route through Darfur. The airfield was operated by the Air Transport Command as a staging base for fighters, bombers, and transport aircraft. In 1942, the runway was extended to accommodate larger aircraft, and a control tower was installed by 1943. By the RAF's request, road infrastructure on provincial roads at El Geneina, El Fasher, Nyala, and Nahud were upgraded to suit all-weather conditions before the 1942 rainy season from June to September. Aviation fuel also had to be trucked in from the east.

=== Post-war ===
At the end of World War II, RAF Geneina was left abandoned by the RAF in good conditions. By 1952, there was only one weekly service to El Geneina from Khartoum. Currently, Geneina Airport hosts a detachment of the 3 Helicopter Squadron of the Sudanese Air Force, operating the Mil Mi-8.

=== Units ===
The following lists the units that were based at RAF El Geneina at one point:

- 1207th AAF Base Unit
- Air Transport Command, Central African Wing

== Airlines and destinations ==
Airlines	Destinations
Badr Airlines	Khartoum (suspended)
Sudan Airways	Khartoum (suspended)

== Accidents and incidents ==
On 2 January, 2020, a Sudanese Air Force Antonov An-12A crashed shortly after take-off from the airport. All eighteen people on board are killed.
