= El Obeid Airport =

El Obeid International Airport Al-Ubayyid Airport
- IATA: EBD; ICAO: HSOB

Summary
- Airport type: Public / Military
- Operator: Government
- Location: El Obeid, Sudan
- Elevation AMSL: 1,927 ft (587 m)
- Coordinates: 13°09′11″N 030°13′57″E

Map
- Location within Sudan

Runways
Direction	Length		Surface
Direction	m	ft	Surface
01/19	3,000	9,843	Asphalt

El Obeid Airport (IATA: EBD, ICAO: HSOB) is an airport serving El Obeid, the capital city of the North Kurdufan state in Sudan.

== Facilities ==
The airport resides at an elevation of 1,927 feet (587 m) above mean sea level. It has one runway designated 01/19 with an asphalt surface measuring 3,000 by 45 metres (9,843 ft × 148 ft).

== Airlines and destinations ==
Airlines	Destinations
Badr Airlines	Khartoum (suspended)

== El Obeid Air Base ==
The airport hosts Sudanese Air Force Helicopter Squadron operating Mil Mi-24 and Mil Mi-35 attack helicopters.
