= Ad-Damazin =

Ad-Damazin الدمازين
- City
- Location in Sudan
- Coordinates: 11°46′N 34°21′E
- Country: Sudan
- State: Blue Nile

Population (2015)
  - Total: 186,051
- Time zone: CAT

Ad-Damazin (Arabic: الدمازين, romanized: Ad-Damāzīn) is the capital city of Blue Nile, Sudan. It is the location of the Roseires Dam and power generation plant.

Ad-Damazin is served by a terminal station of a branch line of the national railway network. However, the train service to Ad-Damazin has been discontinued many years ago. Instead the town can be reached from Khartoum via a decent tarmac road and by plane. However, Damazin Airport is mainly served by UNMIS or government flights. Ad-Damazin is a city filled with many dialects, but the majority of the population speaks Sudanese Arabic, which is an accent of the original Arabic language. The city lies west of the Nile river and northwest of the Roseires reservoir.

Blue Nile University (Jameat Al Neel Alazraq) is a public university located in Ad-Damazin, established in 1995.

== Geography ==
=== Climate ===
Like other parts of the Sahel, Ad-Damazin has a hot semi-arid climate (Köppen climate classification BSh), with a wet season and a dry season and the temperature being hot year-round. The average annual mean temperature is 28.3 °C (82.9 °F), the average annual high temperature is 35.8 °C (96.4 °F), while the average annual low temperature is 20.8 °C (69.4 °F). The hottest time of year is from March to May, just before the wet season starts. April is the hottest month, having the highest average high at 40.5 °C (104.9 °F) and the highest mean at 32.2 °C (90.0 °F). May has the highest average low at 24.8 °C (76.6 °F). August has the lowest average high at 31.1 °C (88.0 °F) and January has the lowest mean at 26.0 °C (78.8 °F). January also has the lowest average low at 16.8 °C (62.2 °F).

Ad-Damazin receives 712.9 millimetres (28.07 in) of rain over 70.7 precipitation days, with a distinct wet and dry season like the rest of the Sahel. January receives no precipitation at all, and almost no rain falls from November to March. July, the wettest month, receives 189.2 millimetres (7.45 in) of rainfall on average. August has 16.9 precipitation days, which is the most of any month. Humidity is much higher in the wet season than the dry season, with March having a humidity at just 21% and August having a humidity at 79%. Ad-Damazin receives 3000.6 hours of sunshine annually on average, with the sunshine being distributed fairly evenly across the year, although it is lower during the wet season. January receives the most sunshine, while July receives the least.

Climate data for Ad-Damazin (1991–2020 normals, extremes 1961–2020)
Month	Jan	Feb	Mar	Apr	May	Jun	Jul	Aug	Sep	Oct	Nov	Dec	Year
Record high °C (°F)	42.2 (108.0)	44.3 (111.7)	44.6 (112.3)	46 (115)	47 (117)	42 (108)	39.5 (103.1)	38.5 (101.3)	38.5 (101.3)	43 (109)	45.7 (114.3)	41.5 (106.7)	47 (117)
Mean daily maximum °C (°F)	35.4 (95.7)	37.6 (99.7)	39.8 (103.6)	40.6 (105.1)	38.6 (101.5)	35.3 (95.5)	32.3 (90.1)	31.6 (88.9)	32.8 (91.0)	34.8 (94.6)	36.8 (98.2)	35.9 (96.6)	36.0 (96.8)
Daily mean °C (°F)	25.9 (78.6)	28.2 (82.8)	30.7 (87.3)	32.7 (90.9)	31.9 (89.4)	29.1 (84.4)	27.1 (80.8)	26.4 (79.5)	27.0 (80.6)	28.3 (82.9)	27.9 (82.2)	26.5 (79.7)	28.5 (83.3)
Mean daily minimum °C (°F)	16.4 (61.5)	18.8 (65.8)	21.6 (70.9)	24.7 (76.5)	25.2 (77.4)	23.0 (73.4)	21.8 (71.2)	21.3 (70.3)	21.2 (70.2)	21.8 (71.2)	18.9 (66.0)	17.0 (62.6)	21.0 (69.8)
Record low °C (°F)	8.5 (47.3)	10 (50)	13.4 (56.1)	16.3 (61.3)	17 (63)	17.5 (63.5)	15 (59)	17 (63)	9.5 (49.1)	14.3 (57.7)	11.3 (52.3)	8.7 (47.7)	8.5 (47.3)
Average precipitation mm (inches)	0.0 (0.0)	0.0 (0.0)	0.2 (0.01)	8.8 (0.35)	59.0 (2.32)	121.7 (4.79)	165.5 (6.52)	197.0 (7.76)	142.2 (5.60)	37.7 (1.48)	1.3 (0.05)	0.0 (0.0)	733.3 (28.87)
Average precipitation days (≥ 1.0 mm)	0.0	0.0	0.1	1.0	5.8	10.6	12.9	14.7	10.0	4.3	0.2	0.0	59.5
Average relative humidity (%)	33	27	23	28	45	62	74	78	76	67	46	37	50
Mean monthly sunshine hours	279.0	254.8	272.8	255.0	248.0	201.0	164.3	173.6	198.0	238.7	285.0	285.2	2,855.4
Source: NOAA

== See also ==
- Railway stations in Sudan
- Al-Damazin Farms
