= Nyala Airport =

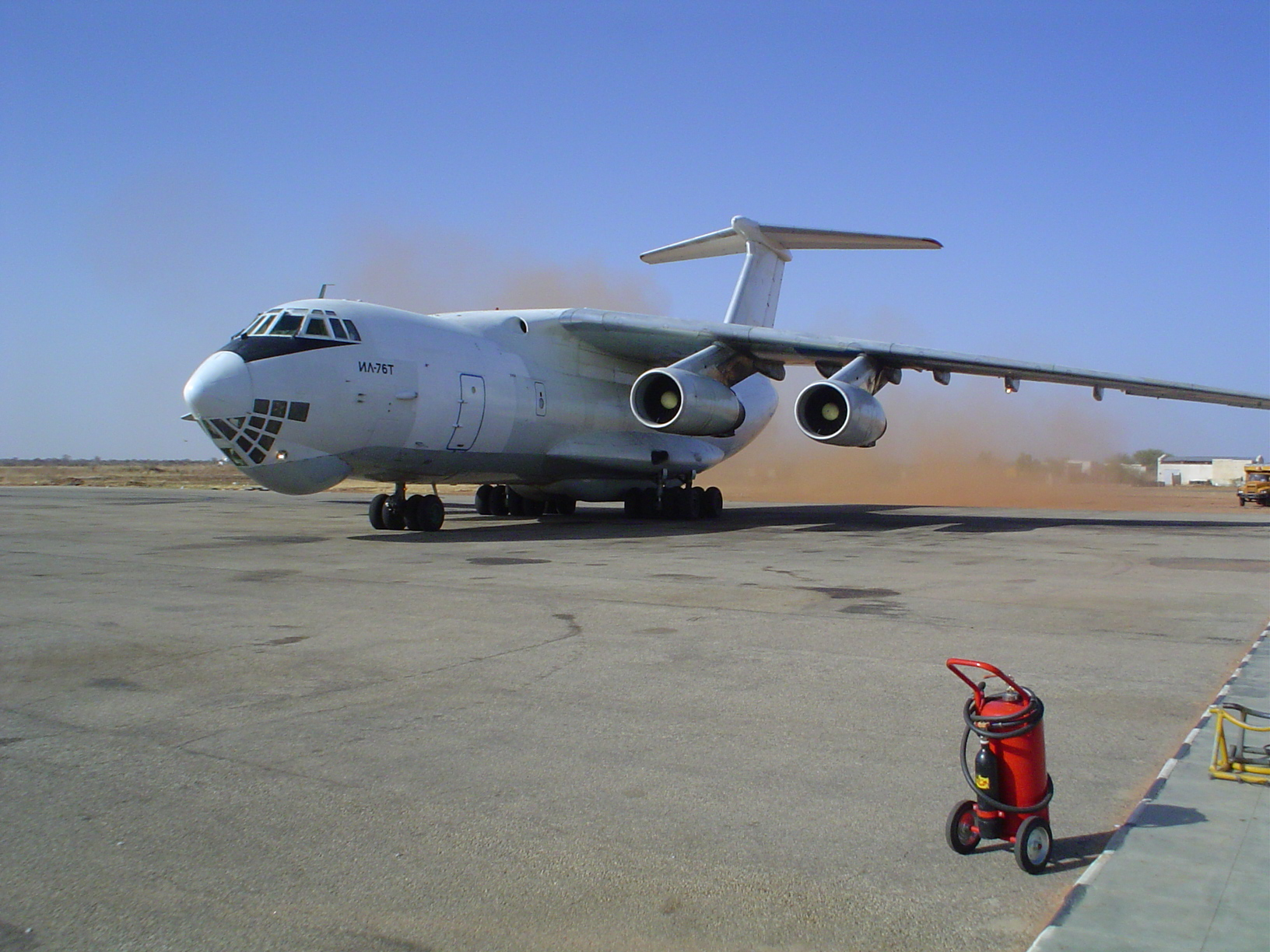
- IATA: UYL; ICAO: HSNN

Summary
- Airport type: Public / Military
- Serves: Nyala, Sudan
- Location: Nyala, Sudan
- Elevation AMSL: 638 m (2,093 ft)
- Coordinates: 12°03′13″N 024°57′22″E

Map
- Airport in Sudan

Runways
| Direction | Length | | Surface |
| Direction | m | ft | Surface |
|---|---|---|---|
| 04/22 | 3,011 | 9,880 | Asphalt |
- Source: World Aero Data

Nyala Airport is an airport in Nyala, South Darfur, Sudan (IATA: UYL, ICAO: HSNN). United Nations peacekeeping force UNAMID uses a separated terminal in Nyala Airport.

== History ==
In 2009, the airport connected Nyala with Khartoum, El Fasher, El Geneina, and El Obeid. On 21 September 2018, the first cargo plane landed in the airport.

In 2023, the airport was controlled by the Rapid Support Forces (RSF) during the Sudanese Civil War. On 24 September 2024, the Sudanese Armed Forces (SAF) launched airstrikes on the airport with heavy damaged reported on its runway, control tower, and offices.

A cargo Boeing 737-290C Advanced operated by IBM Airlines was destroyed at the airport by the Sudanese Armed Forces (SAF) during the Sudanese civil war on 3 May 2025. It was destroyed due to suspicions of carrying military weapons and supplies to the Rapid Support Forces (RSF). All 20 occupants on board the aircraft were killed. Sources disagree on if it was a bombing or a shootdown. A Boeing 727 operated by an unknown airline crashed killing all 19 occupants on 23 October 2025.

== Airlines and destinations ==
| Airlines | Destinations |
|---|---|
| Badr Airlines | Khartoum (suspended) |
| Nova Airways | El Fasher, Khartoum (suspended) |
| Sudan Airways | Khartoum (suspended) |

== Nyala Air Base ==
Nyala Airport hosts two Sudanese Air Force units:

- Helicopter Squadrons (Mil Mi-8, Mil Mi-24, Mil Mi-35)
- Transport Squadron (Antonov An-32)
