= Port Sudan New International Airport =

International airport serving Port Sudan, Sudan

Port Sudan New International Airport _{مطار بورتسودان الدولي الجديد}
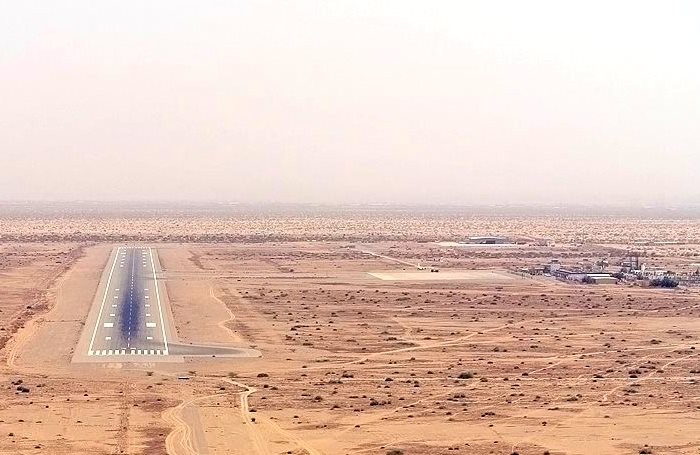
- IATA: PZU; ICAO: HSPN

Summary
- Airport type: Public
- Owner: Government of Sudan
- Operator: Sudan Airports Holding
- Serves: Port Sudan, Sudan
- Location: Port Sudan, Sudan
- Elevation AMSL: 43 m (141 ft)
- Coordinates: 19°26′01″N 037°14′03″E

Map
- Location of the airport in Sudan

Runways
| Direction | Length | | Surface |
| Direction | m | ft | Surface |
|---|---|---|---|
| 16/34 | 2,502 | 8,209 | Asphalt |

Port Sudan New International Airport (IATA: PZU, ICAO: HSPN) is an international airport serving Port Sudan. It is located 20 kilometres (12 mi) south of the city. The airport is the second-largest international airport in Sudan in terms of air traffic and international destinations served. Since 2023, the airport has been serving as the main gateway to Sudan due to the ongoing Sudanese civil war (2023-present).

== History ==
The airport opened in 1992. It replaced the old Port Sudan Military Airport.

== Airlines and destinations ==
| Airlines | Destinations |
|---|---|
| Badr Airlines | Juba |
| Egyptair | Cairo |
| Ethiopian Airlines | Addis Ababa |
| Qatar Airways | Doha |
| SalamAir | Muscat |
| Sudan Airways | Cairo, Jeddah, Riyadh |
| Tarco Aviation | Muscat |
| Turkish Airlines | Istanbul |

== Accidents and incidents ==
- On 8 July 2003, Sudan Airways Flight 139, a Boeing 737, crashed about 15 minutes after take-off. All but one of the 117 passengers and crew were killed in the crash. The cause was mechanical failure followed by pilot error. A 2-year old was the only survivor of the accident.
- On 6 May 2025, a fuel depot in the airport was targeted with a drone by the Rapid Support Forces, causing a major explosion and fire and leading to the suspension of all flight operations.

== Port Sudan Air Base ==
The airport hosts Sudanese Air Force Flight School (Chengdu JJ-5 (FT-5) and K-8S).

== See also ==
- List of airports in Sudan
