= El Fasher Airport =

Airport in North Darfur, Sudan

El Fashir Airport
- IATA: ELF; ICAO: HSFS

Summary
- Airport type: Public / Military
- Operator: Government
- Serves: El Fasher, Sudan
- Elevation AMSL: 2,393 ft (729 m)
- Coordinates: 13°36′53″N 025°19′28″E

Map
- Location within Sudan

Runways
Direction	Length		Surface
Direction	m	ft	Surface
05/23	2,970	9,744	Asphalt
18/36	1,527	5,010	Gravel

El Fasher Airport (IATA: ELF, ICAO: HSFS), also known as Al Fashir Airport, is an airport serving El Fasher (Al Fashir), the capital city of the North Darfur state in Sudan.

United Nations peacekeeping force UNAMID uses a special terminal at El Fasher Airport for transportation.

== Facilities ==
The airport resides at an elevation of 2,393 feet (729 m) above mean sea level. It has 2 runways: 05/23 with an asphalt surface measuring 2,970 by 45 metres (9,744 ft × 148 ft) and 18/36 with a gravel surface measuring 1,527 by 45 metres (5,010 ft × 148 ft).

== Airlines and destinations ==
Airlines	Destinations
Badr Airlines	Khartoum (suspended)
Nova Airways	Khartoum (suspended), Nyala
Sudan Airways	Khartoum (suspended)

== El Fasher Air Base ==
The airport hosts a number of Sudanese Air Force units:

- Fighter (Close Air Support) Squadron (Sukhoi Su-25)
- Helicopter Squadron (Mil Mi-8, Mil Mi-24, Mil Mi-35)
- Transport Squadron (Antonov An-26)
