= Juba International Airport =

International airport serving Juba, South Sudan

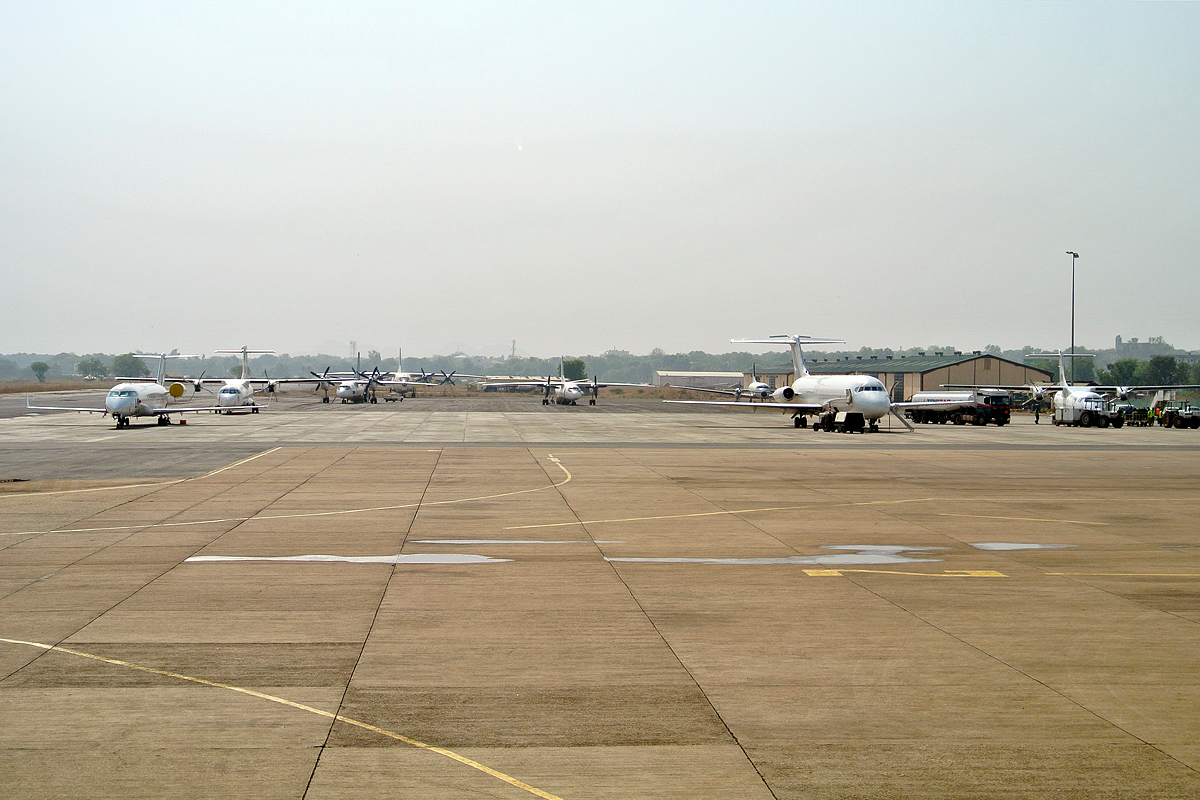
- IATA: JUB; ICAO: HJJJ

Summary
- Airport type: Public / Military
- Operator: Civil Aviation Authority of South Sudan
- Serves: Juba
- Location: Juba, Central Equatoria, South Sudan
- Elevation AMSL: 1,511 ft (461 m)
- Coordinates: 4°52′19″N 31°36′4″E

Map
- Location of the airport in South Sudan

Runways
Direction	Length		Surface
Direction	m	ft	Surface
13/31	3,100	10,171	Asphalt

Juba International Airport (IATA: JUB, ICAO: HJJJ) is a multi-use international airport serving Juba, the capital city of South Sudan. The airport is located 5 km (3.1 mi) northeast of the city's central business district, on the western banks of the White Nile. The city and airport are located in South Sudan's Central Equatoria State.

It is one of the two international airports in South Sudan, the other being Malakal Airport. Juba Airport handles international and local airlines, cargo air traffic and chartered commercial flights. It is also used by the South Sudanese military and by the United Nations agencies such as UNMISS, UNHAS and the World Food Programme, as well as the ICRC and many NGOs for relief flights for the country.

== History ==
The first airfield in Juba was cleared in 1929. The Shell Company constructed the first runway in 1931. It was surfaced with crushed laterite. In February 1931, Imperial Airways opened the first 2,670 miles of the weekly Croydon to Tanganyika Territory (now part of Tanzania) portion of the Cape to Cairo air-route, and established a mooring place near Rejaf to the south of Juba, for Imperial Airways' Calcutta flying-boats, which carried passengers between Khartoum and Kisumu. Labourers had been settling on the land that has since become the Juba airport's present location and, in 1934, when the Juba aerodrome was expanded and cleared, these residents were relocated. By 1976, the runway had been expanded to 2,400 by 45 meters and paved with asphalt. Access roads leading to the terminal buildings were unsurfaced and "almost impassable during the rainy season." The airport's "very old radio beacon" was located a short distance from the airport, which was also equipped with a weak VHF radio for pilot-to-ground communication. Field lighting was not present.

In early February 1977, the airport was the site of an unsuccessful coup attempt, when ex-Anyanya forces attempted to take the airport.

=== Airport expansion and country's independence ===
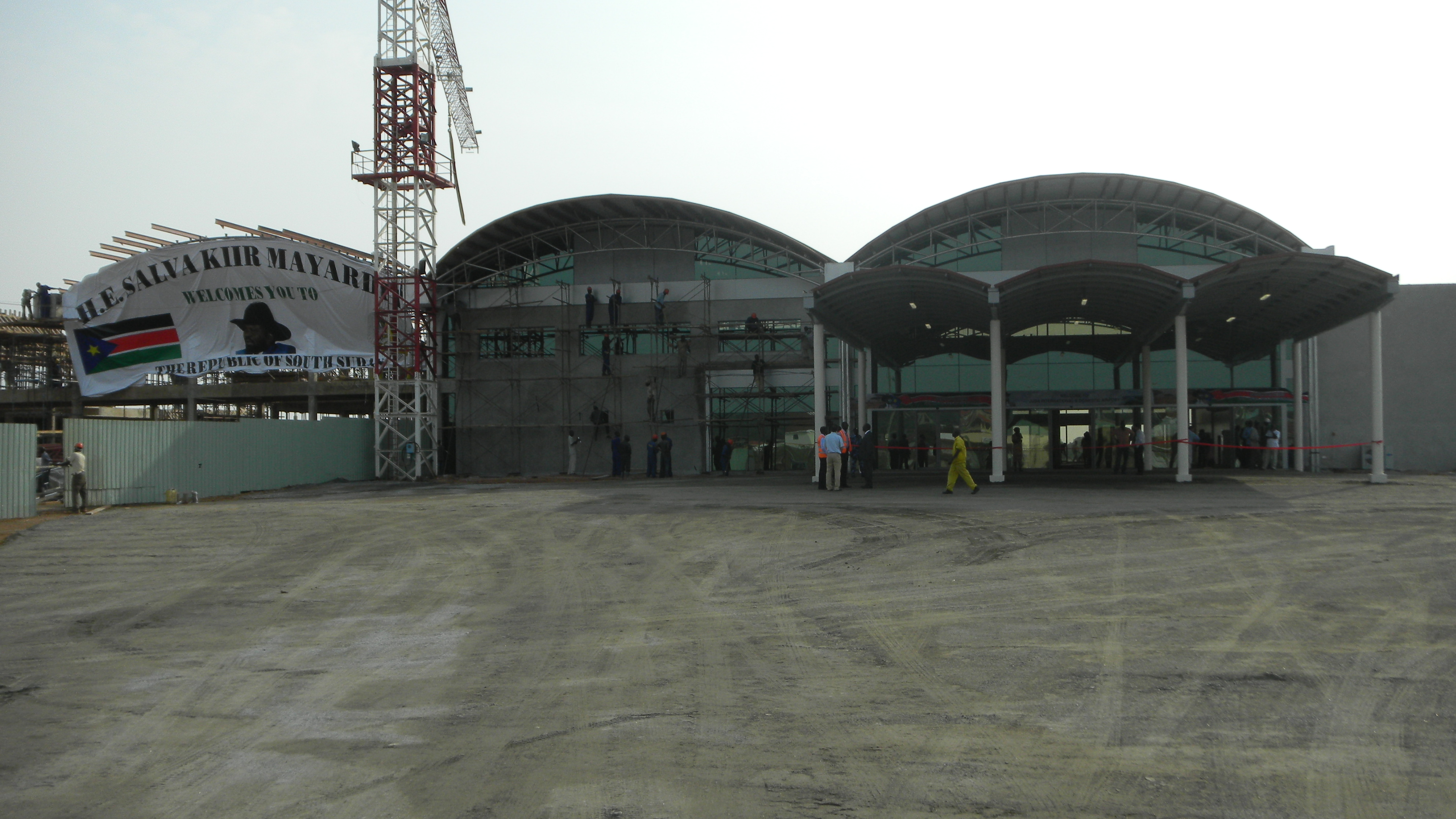
Juba Airport Terminal under construction.

As of May 2011, Juba International Airport was undergoing improvements and expansion. The work on the airport included expansion of the passenger and cargo terminal buildings, resurfacing of the runway and installation of runway lights to facilitate night operations.

As of July 2011, the day of the country's independence, Juba International Airport had a new runway light system commissioned with simple approach lights for Runway 13/31, runway edge lights, taxiway lights for Exit Delta, Apron edge lights, illuminated windsocks, ATC tower rotating beacon as well as PAPI for both approaches.

In 2016, Juba International Airport was ranked the second worst airport in the world in a survey conducted by The Guide to Sleeping in Airports. It was the worst airport in 2017 and the fourth worst in 2019. During this time the terminal consisted of two adjacent tents to facilitate customs and immigration, arrivals and departures. A new, smaller terminal was built on the site of the original terminal by the Chinese. The new terminal was inaugurated on 29 October 2018.

== Facilities ==
The airport resides at an elevation of 461 metres (1,513 ft) above mean sea level. It has one runway designated 13/31 with an asphalt surface measuring 3,100 m (10,171 ft) long and 45 m (148 ft) wide.

== Airlines and destinations ==
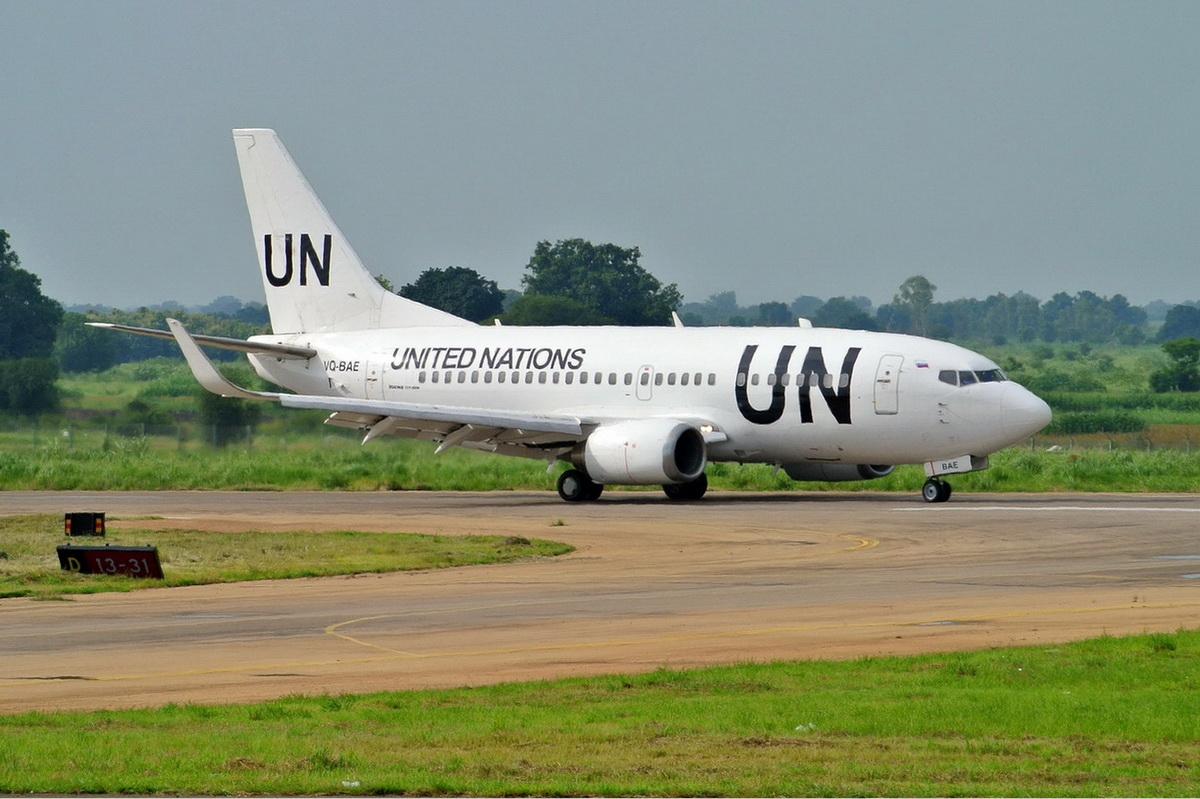
UTair Boeing 737 operating for United Nations Humanitarian Air Service taxiing at Juba Airport.

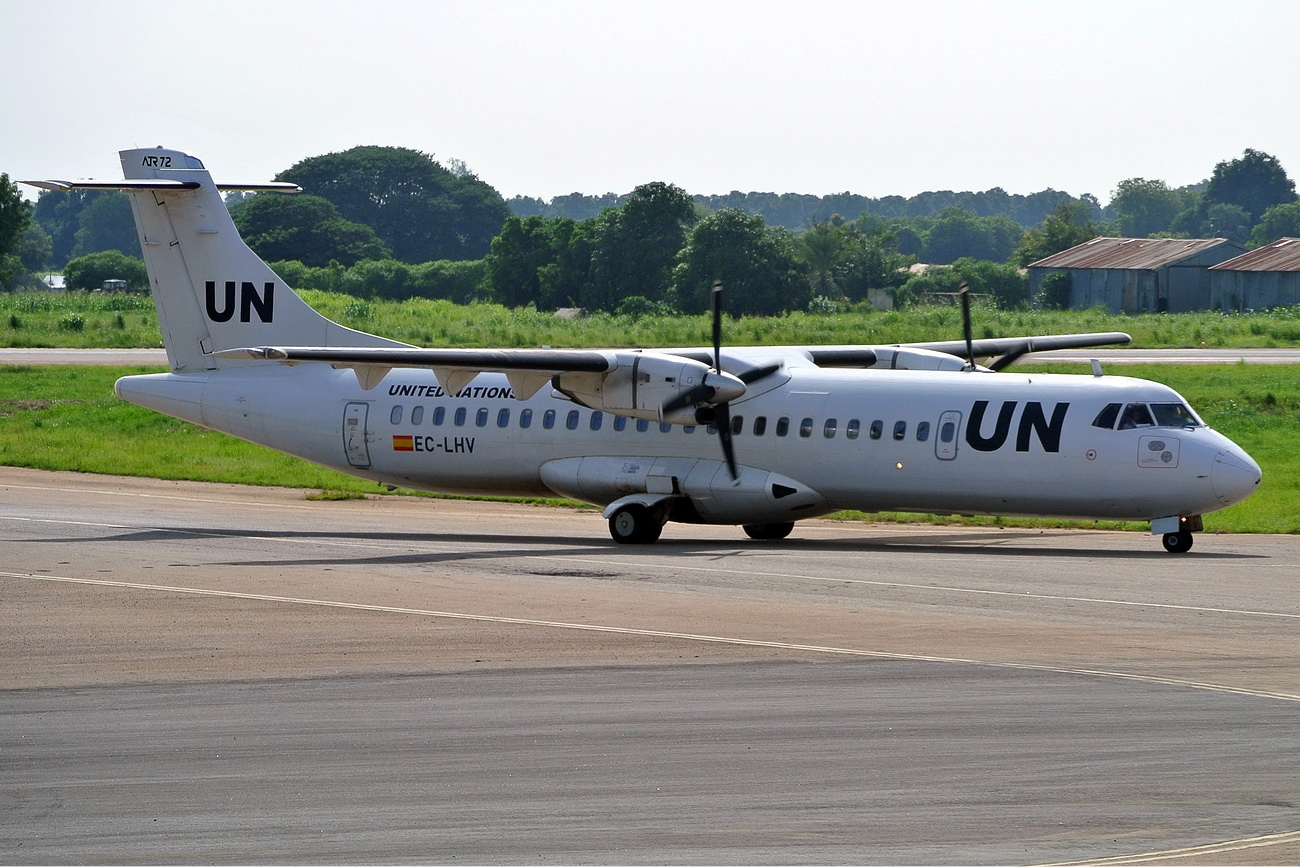
Swiftair ATR-72 operating for United Nations Humanitarian Air Service taxiing at Juba Airport.

=== Passenger ===
Airlines	Destinations
Egyptair	Cairo
Ethiopian Airlines	Addis Ababa
flydubai	Dubai–International
Kenya Airways	Nairobi–Jomo Kenyatta
Tarco Aviation	Port Sudan
Turkish Airlines	Istanbul (suspended)

== Accidents and incidents ==
- On 12 August 1990, Lockheed L-100-30 Hercules N911SJ of Southern Air Transport took off on a flight to Nairobi. Early in climbout, number 4 engine started to lose power, then engines 1 and 2 developed overspeed and pitch lock issues. On the way back to Juba, engine 3 lost power. The aircraft successfully landed, but overran the runway, colliding with containers and was a write off. The crew of five survived.
- On 19 December 2013, a Nova Airways Boeing 737-500 registration ST-NVG suffered nose-gear collapse resulting in major damage when landing at Juba. This was the same day that many people were being evacuated from Juba because of the South Sudanese Civil War. The Nova Airways aircraft blocked the runway for several hours, delaying the evacuation. The aircraft was repaired and returned to service.
- On 10 December 2019, Ethiopian Airlines Flight 357, a Bombardier Dash 8 Q400 registration ET-AQC excursed from the runway during takeoff. The aircraft was substantially damaged. All 21 people on board survived.
- On 2 November 2021, a cargo An-26 crashed soon after taking off, killing 5 people.
- On 27 April 2026, a Cessna 208 Caravan operated by CityLink Aviation crashed south-west of Juba killing all 15 occupants.

== See also ==
- Equatoria
- List of airports in South Sudan
