= List of companies of Sudan =

Location of Sudan

Sudan, officially the Republic of the Sudan, is a country in North Africa. In 2010, Sudan was considered the 17th-fastest-growing economy in the world and the rapid development of the country largely from oil profits even when facing international sanctions was noted by The New York Times in a 2006 article. Because of the secession of South Sudan, which contained over 80 percent of Sudan's oilfields, the economic forecast for Sudan in 2011 and beyond is uncertain.

== Notable firms ==
This list includes notable companies with primary headquarters located in the country. The industry and sector follow the Industry Classification Benchmark taxonomy. Organizations which have ceased operations are included and noted as defunct.

Notable companies Status: P=Private, S=State; A=Active, D=Defunct
Name	Industry	Sector	Headquarters	Founded	Notes	Status	
Air West	Consumer services	Airlines	Khartoum	1992	Airline	P	A
Al Shamal Islamic Bank	Financials	Banks	Khartoum	1983	Islamic bank	P	A
Azza Transport	Industrials	Delivery services	Khartoum	1993	Cargo airline	P	A
Badr Airlines	Consumer services	Airlines	Khartoum	2004	Airline	P	A
Bank of Khartoum	Financials	Banks	Khartoum	1913	Bank	P	A
Bank of Sudan	Financials	Banks	Khartoum	1960	Central bank	S	A
Blue Bird Aviation	Consumer services	Airlines	Khartoum	1989	Charter airline	P	A
Greater Nile Petroleum Operating Company	Oil & gas	Exploration & production	Khartoum	1997	Petroleum exploration and extraction	P	A
Green Flag Airlines	Consumer services	Airlines	Khartoum	1992	Airline	P	A
Juba Air Cargo	Industrials	Delivery services	Khartoum	1996	Cargo airline	P	A
Marsland Aviation	Consumer services	Airlines	Khartoum	2001	Airline, defunct 2013	P	D
Mid Airlines	Consumer services	Airlines	Khartoum	2002	Charter airline	P	A
Military Industry Corporation	Industrials	Defense	Khartoum	1993	State-owned defense	S	A
National Bank of Sudan	Financials	Banks	Khartoum	1983	Private bank	P	A
Nova Airways	Consumer services	Airlines	Khartoum	2000	Passenger airline	P	A
PetroDar	Oil & gas	Exploration & production	Khartoum	2001	Oil exploration and production	P	A
Sea Ports Corporation, Sudan	Industrials	Transportation services	Port Sudan	1974	Port operations	P	A
Southern Star Airlines	Consumer services	Airlines	Juba	2011	Airline, defunct 2011	P	D
Sudan Airways	Consumer services	Airlines	Khartoum	1946	National airline	S	A
Sudan Khartoum Refinery Company	Oil & gas	Exploration & production	Khartoum	1997	Refining	P	A
Sudani One	Telecommunications	Mobile telecommunications	Khartoum	2009	Mobile network	P	A
Sudapak	Oil & gas	Exploration & production	Khartoum	2003	Petroleum exploration and extraction	P	A
Sudapet	Oil & gas	Exploration & production	Khartoum	1997	State oil	S	A
Sudatel	Telecommunications	Fixed line telecommunications	Khartoum	1993	Telecom	P	A
Sun Air	Consumer services	Airlines	Khartoum	2008	Private airline	P	A
Tarco Airlines	Consumer services	Airlines	Khartoum	2009	Airline	P	A
White Nile Petroleum Operating Company	Oil & gas	Exploration & production	Khartoum	2001	Petroleum exploration and extraction	P	A
Zain Sudan	Telecommunications	Mobile telecommunications	Khartoum	1996	Mobile network	P	A

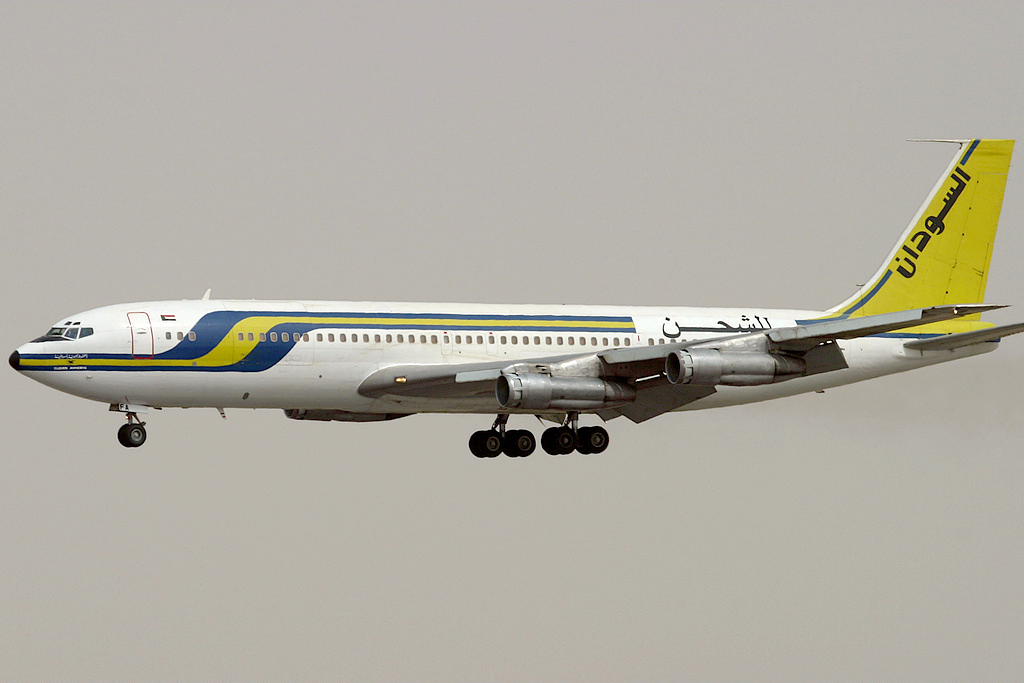
A Sudan Airways Boeing 707-320C on final approach to Sharjah International Airport in 2006

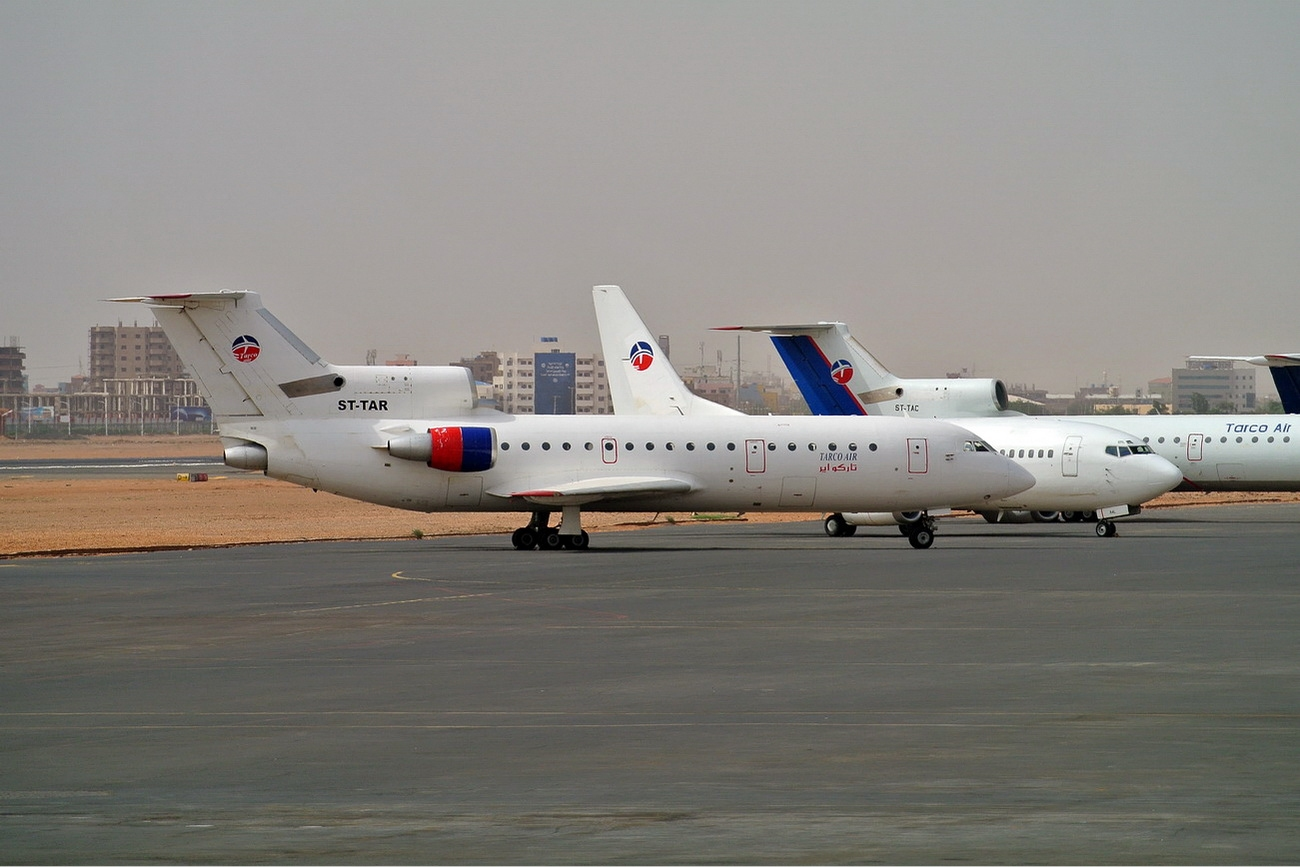
Tarco Airlines Yakovlev Yak-42D

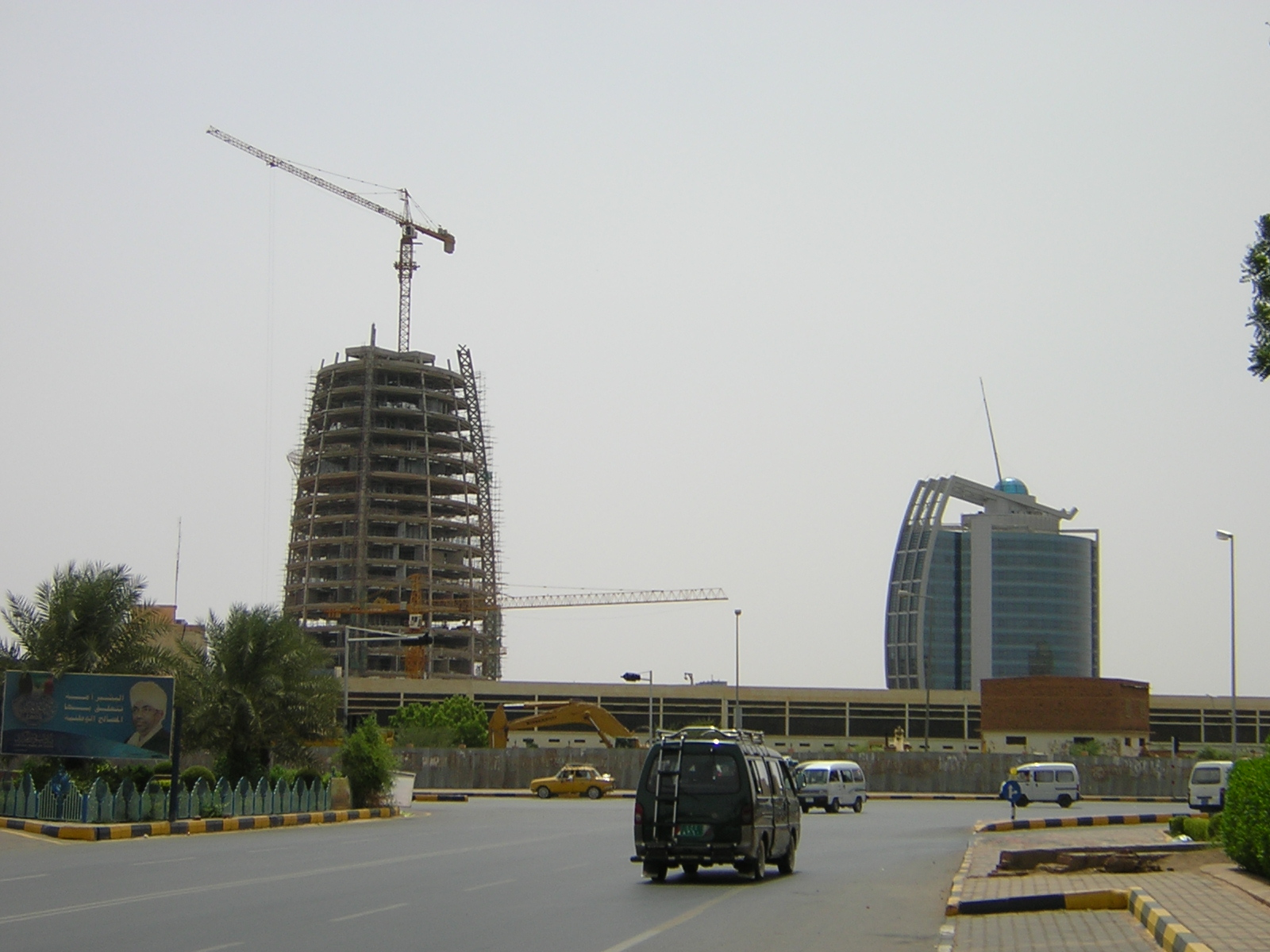
Development in Khartoum in 2009, with the PDOC Headquarters on right and the under-construction GNPOC Tower on left

== See also ==
- Economy of Sudan
- List of airlines of Sudan
- List of banks in Sudan
