= List of airlines of Sudan =

This is a list of airlines currently operating in Sudan. All airlines are banned from flying into the European Union.

Airline	Airline (in Arabic)	Image	IATA	ICAO	Callsign	Commenced operations
Ababeel Aviation				BBE		2002
Air Taxi Sudan				WAM		2005
Air West				AWZ		1992
Alfa Airlines						2002
Alok Air				LOK		2006
Badr Airlines	بدر للطيران		J4	BDR	BADR AIR	2004
Bentiu Air Transport				BNT		1996
Blue Bird Aviation				BLB	BLUEBIRD SUDAN	1989
Dove Air Services				DOV	DOVAIR	2007
El Magal Aviation Services	المجال للنقل الجوي					1996
Eldinder Aviation				DND		2006
Green Flag Aviation				GRF	GREEN FLAG AIR	1992
Kata Air Transport				KTV		2003
Mid Airlines			7Y	NYL	NILE	2002
Nova Airways	نوفا للطيران		O9	NOV	NOVANILE	2000
SASCO Airlines	ساسكو للطيران			SAC		1987
Sudan Airways	الخطوط الجوية السودانية		SD	SUD	SUDANAIR	1946
Sun Air (Sudan)			ZU	SNR	SUN GROUP	2008
Tarco Aviation	تاركو للطيران		3T	TQQ	TQQ	2010

== See also ==
- List of defunct airlines of Sudan
- List of airports in Sudan
- List of companies based in Sudan
- List of air carriers banned in the European Union
