= List of defunct airlines of Sudan =

This is a list of defunct airlines of Sudan.

Airline	Image	IATA	ICAO	Callsign	Commenced operations	Ceased operations	Notes
Air West Express			AWZ	Airwest	1992	2003	renamed/merged to: East / West Cargo
Almajara Aviation			MJA		2007	2013	
Azza Transport			AZZ	AZZATRANSPORT	1993	2013	
Ben-Air					1996	2001	renamed/merged to: Bentiu Air Transport
Coptrade Air Transport			CCW		1995	2006	
Data International Aviation			DTN		1995	2006	
East / West Cargo					2003	2005	renamed/merged to: Air West
Forty Eight Aviation					2010	2011	
Golden Star Air Cargo		SZ	GLD		1986	1999	
Juba Air Cargo			JUC	JUBACARGO	1997	2008	
Marsland Aviation		M7	MSL	MARSLANDAIR	2001	2013	
Nile Safaris Avn			NSA		1958	1999	
Nova Airline			M4	NOVANILE	2006	2011	renamed/merged to Nova Airways
Sarit Air Lines			SRW		1997	2004	Rebranded as Badr Airlines
SASCO Air Charter			SAC		1987	1993	renamed/merged to: SASCO AL
Spirit of Africa Airlines			SDN		2002	2006	
Sudania Air Cargo					?	1990	
Trans Arabian Air Transport			TRT		1983	2008	
Trans Attico		ML	ETC		1998	2009	
United Arabian Airlines			UAB		1995	2007	

== See also ==
- List of airlines of Sudan
- List of airports in Sudan
