= Petroleum industry in Sudan =

The petroleum industry in Sudan began in 1979, when the first commercial flow in the country occurred.

== 1970s-1980s ==
Prior to the discovery of oil, roughly 80 percent of the nation's energy requirement for industry, modern agriculture, transportation, government services, and households (in addition to fuelwood, charcoal, and the like) came from imported petroleum and petroleum products. Approximately 10 percent of those imports were used to generate electricity. Foreign-exchange costs for oil imports rose dramatically after 1973. The discovery of domestic petroleum deposits at the end of the 1970s and during the early 1980s thus promised to—and eventually did—lessen the dependence on expensive external sources.

The search for oil began in 1959 in the Red Sea littoral and continued intermittently into the 1970s. In 1974 the U.S. firm Chevron began exploration in southern and southwestern Sudan. Drilling began in 1977, and the first commercial flow started in July 1979 at Abu Jabrah in South Darfur. In 1980 major finds occurred at the company’s Unity Field near Bentiu; by early 1981, drilling had brought in 49 wells having a combined flow of more than 12,000 barrels per day (b/d). Other oil companies—including some from the United States, Canada, and France—also obtained concessions, and by 1982 almost one-third of Sudan had been assigned for exploration. Oil exploration and production were hampered, however, by the almost total lack of infrastructure and by the civil war in the South.

The domestic processing of crude petroleum began in late 1964, when the Port Sudan oil refinery went into operation. The refinery, which was financed, built, and managed by the British Petroleum and Royal Dutch Shell companies—from July 1976 as a joint-equal shareholding project with the government—had a capacity of about 21,440 barrels per day. Its capacity was well in excess of Sudan's needs at the time it was built, and refined products were exported. As domestic demand increased in the 1980s, and with new petroleum discoveries, several plans were developed for a new oil refinery and an export pipeline. By 1986, however, those plans had been cancelled. Sudan had to import both gas oil (used in diesel motors and for heating) and kerosene for domestic use, although a substantial quantity of other products refined by the plant, in excess of Sudan’s own needs, continued to be exported.

Further seismic studies were undertaken in the swamps of Al-Sudd, but all of Chevron's exploration and development activities came to an abrupt end in February 1984, when rebels attacked the main Chevron base across the Bahr al-Ghazal from Bentiu, killing four Chevron employees. The company immediately terminated its development program and, despite repeated demands by successive Sudanese governments, refused to return to work its concession until the safety of its personnel could be guaranteed by a settlement of the Sudanese civil war. Total, the French oil company, shut down its operations several months later.

== 1990s to present ==
The Canadian firm Arakis bought the Chevron concession in the Muglad basin, north of Bentiu, and in March 1997 formed a consortium, the Greater Nile Petroleum Operating Company (GNPOC), with the China National Petroleum Corporation (CNPC), the Malaysian state oil company Petroliam Nasional Berhad (PETRONAS), and the publicly owned Sudan National Petroleum Corporation (Sudapet). In 1998 another Canadian firm, Talisman Energy, purchased the share of Arakis and then, under pressure from international nongovernmental organizations (which were opposed to the Islamist regime in Khartoum), sold it to a state-owned Indian oil company in 2003. Other companies that also invested in concessions included the Qatar-based Gulf Petroleum and the French oil company Total. The Swedish company Lundin Oil and the Austrian firm OMV were also involved, but both withdrew from the country because of deteriorating security conditions.

Prior to 2005, the only concession producing petroleum was GNPOC. However, many other fields were under development, such as the concession being developed by the consortium led by CNPC, PETRONAS, Sudapet, Sinopec, and Cairo-based Tri-Ocean Energy. In 2003 and 2004, the consortium began construction of a new export pipeline and export terminal, as well as in-field production and transportation facilities. South Sudan’s national oil company, Nile Petroleum Corporation (Nilepet), was also involved in allocating licenses.

In 2005 Sudan established the National Petroleum Commission to improve the development of the country’s oil resources. The commission allocates new oil contracts and ensures equal sharing of oil revenues between the national government in Khartoum and the Government of South Sudan (GOSS). It also resolved duplicate oil contract issues in which the GOSS allocated blocks that overlapped the contracts previously granted by the national government in Khartoum.

Intensive exploration by GNPOC resulted in known reserves of 800 million barrels in 2004. At that time, however, studies suggested that production might eventually increase to more than 4 billion barrels, with recovery rates of 30–35 percent, and generate total oil income of about US$30 billion. Exploration was expected to continue not only in the South, but also in the North near Dongola, the East around Port Sudan, the West, and also offshore. As of 2009, proven oil reserves increased to 5 billion barrels, and there were proven natural gas reserves of 3 trillion cubic feet, although there was no production of natural gas by early 2011. The majority of the reserves were in South Sudan.

Additional refining capacity became essential as oil production increased. A US$600 million refinery at Al-Jayli, north of Khartoum, came online in mid-2000 with a capacity of around 60,000 b/d, which allowed Sudan to become self-sufficient in refined products. The export pipeline, which passed close to it, provided the resources for the refinery, which also produces a small surplus of refined goods, especially benzine, for export.

In addition to the refineries at Al-Jayli and Port Sudan, there are also some smaller refineries. They include El Obeid, with a capacity of 15,000 b/d, Abu Jabrah, with a capacity of about 2,000 b/d, and a topping plant built by Concorp with a capacity of 5,000 b/d.

Refining capacity increased in July 2006 as CNPC completed the expansion of the Al-Jayli refinery north of Khartoum to 100,000 b/d. An Indian energy company, Oil and Natural Gas Corporation (ONGC), had a contract to increase the capacity of the 40-year-old Port Sudan refinery from 21,000 b/d to 70,000 b/d, while PETRONAS was awarded a $1 billion joint venture with the government to build a second 100,000 b/d refinery in Port Sudan to process the new Dar Blend crude from its Melut concession in southeastern Sudan. This project had been postponed several times by 2010, however, and its status is unknown. Among other developments, Malaysia’s Peremba has begun construction of a marine export terminal, with a capacity of 2 million b/d, known as the Melut Basin Oil Development Project.

Domestic production of petroleum was about 480,000 b/d in 2008, and consumption was approximately 86,000 b/d, with the remaining 394,000 b/d exported to Asian markets, the majority to China, Japan, and Indonesia. Most of the oil was exported as crude, although some refined products were also exported. Sudanese Nile Blend oil is a medium, sweet crude, with low sulphur and metal content. It is sold at a discount to the Indonesian blend, Minas, the medium-sweet benchmark in Asia. Dar Blend is also exported to Asian markets, but its heavy, sour quality causes it to trade at a discount, often severe, to Minas crude. There has been a continuing trend of declining output of Nile Blend oil and increasing output of the less valuable Dar Blend, although total output remains relatively steady. The shift from Nile to Dar, however, means that a larger share of Sudan’s oil is being produced in the South, about 78 percent.

Sudan’s minister for energy and mining indicated in May 2010 that there might be modest output increases over the next several years. He also indicated, however, that the recoverable reserves in the existing fields, using current technology, were only about 1.6 billion barrels, less than a decade of production at current output rates, and that production at those fields would only be a quarter of their current level by 2019. He was confident, however, that new recovery technology could increase the amount recoverable from the fields and that new fields would be discovered. He also was confident that production of natural gas would occur by that time.

Satellite photographs were available in 2011 that provided evidence of oil exploration taking place in North Darfur, although the consortium of Arab companies holding the concession had not confirmed the exploration or indicated whether oil was discovered there. This region has geological connections to the oil-producing regions in southeastern Libya.

In May 2006, Sudan was invited to become a voting member of OPEC. The country had had observer status since 1999 and was now qualified to join OPEC according to conditions set by the organization, although as of 2011 it had not yet become a member.
