= SSIM (disambiguation) =

SSIM may refer to:

== General ==
- Structural similarity index measure in image processing
- South Sudan Independence Movement
- Saturated structured illumination microscopy
- Standard Schedules Information Manual in aviation

== Educational institutions ==
- Swedish School in Moscow (Svenska Skolan i Moskva)
- S. S. Institute of Medical Sciences, a medical school in Davanagere, Karnataka, India
