= List of banks in Sudan =

This is a list of commercial banks in Sudan, as updated by late 2024 by the Central Bank of Sudan.

Al Jazeera Sudanese Jordanian Bank

- Alkhaleej Bank
- Abu Dhabi Islamic Bank
- Qatar Islamic Bank
- National Bank of Egypt Khartoum, part of National Bank of Egypt Group
- Arab Sudanese Bank
- Bank of Khartoum (BOK)
- National Bank of Abu Dhabi
- Sudanese Islamic Bank
- Savings and Social Development Bank
- Family Bank
- Alsalam Bank
- National Bank of Sudan
- Export Development Bank
- Capital Bank
- Qatar National Bank
- Blue Nile Mashreq Bank
- Al Jazeera Sudanese Jordanian Bank
- Balad Bank
- Farmers Commercial Bank
- El Nilein Bank
- Saudi Sudanese Bank
- Sudanese French Bank
- Baraka Bank Sudan
- Commercial Real Estate Bank
- Nile Bank
- Ivory Bank
- Sudanese Egyptian Bank
- Animal Resource Bank
- Agricultural Bank of Sudan
- Financial Investment Bank
- Workers National Bank
- Byblos Bank Africa, part of Byblos Bank Group
- Omdurman National Bank
- Industrial Development Bank of Sudan
- Tadamon Islamic Bank
- Faisal Islamic Bank of Sudan
- Future Bank (Sudan)

== See also ==
- Economy of Sudan
- List of companies based in Sudan
- List of banks in the Arab world
- List of banks in Africa
