= Faisal Islamic Bank of Sudan =

Islamic bank of Sudan

Faisal Islamic Bank (Sudan)
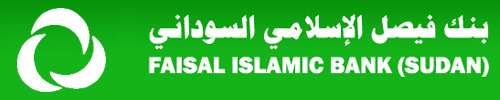
- Company type: Private company
- Industry: Banking
- Founded: May 1977
- Headquarters: Khartoum, Sudan
- Number of locations: 65 branches
- Products: Islamic banking
- Number of employees: 1,288 (2017)
- Website: www.fibsudan.com

Faisal Islamic Bank (Sudan) is an Islamic bank in Sudan. The bank describes itself as having "Islamic orientation" and "Sudanese features". The Indian site Siasat Daily describes it as Sudan’s "largest lender", and one that as of 2016 "favours low-risk, short-term loans and quick returns".

== History ==
According to the bank, it was founded in May 1977, by "86 Sudanese and Saudi founders as well as other nationals of some Islamic States" who "prescribed and paid up half of the authorized capital". The bank is headquartered in Khartoum and lists 65 branches mostly in Khartoum, Khartoum North and Omdurman. Bloomberg lists it as having 1,288 Employees.

According to the Chicago Tribune, the bank was founded by Al Shamal Islamic Bank and four other parties. According to public records, 19 percent of the Faisal Islamic Bank is owned by the Dar Al-Maal Al-Islami Trust, or simply DMI Trust, also headed by Prince Faisal. The $3.5 billion DMI Trust, whose slogan is "Allah is the purveyor of success," was founded in 1981 to foster the spread of Islamic banking across the Muslim world. Its 12-member board of directors includes Haydar Mohamed Bin Laden, a half-brother of Osama bin Laden, according to a DMI spokesman. Other shareholders include:

- Adel Batterjee, also chairman as recently as 2002.
- Al Baraka Investment and Development Corporation

The bank is partially owned by Saudi Arabia.

== See also ==
- List of banks
- List of banks in Sudan
