= Transport in Sudan =

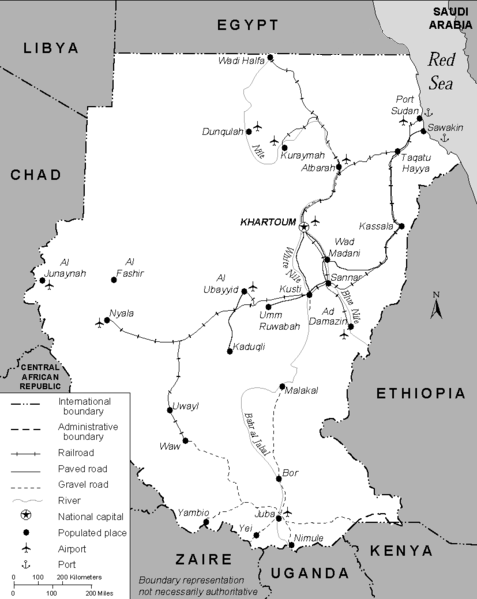
Map of transportation in Sudan (1991).

Transport in Sudan during the early 1990s included an extensive railroad system that served the more important populated areas except in the far south, a meager road network (very little of which consisted of all-weather roads), a natural inland waterway—the Nile River and its tributaries—and a national airline that provided both international and domestic service. Complementing this infrastructure was Port Sudan, a major deep-water port on the Red Sea, and a small but modern national merchant marine. Additionally, a pipeline transporting petroleum products extended from the port to Khartoum.

Only minimal efforts had been expended through the early 1980s to improve existing and, according to both Sudanese and foreign observers, largely inefficiently operated transport facilities. Increasing emphasis on economic development placed a growing strain on the system. Beginning in the mid-1970s, a substantial proportion of public investment funds was allocated for transport sector development. Some progress toward meeting equipment goals had been reported by the beginning of the 1980s, but substantial further modernization and adequately trained personnel were still required. Until these were in place, inadequate transportation was expected to constitute a major obstacle to Sudan's economic development.

== Railways ==
Railways in Sudan

Total: 7,251 km (4,506 miles)

Narrow gauge: 5,851 km (3,636 miles)

0.600m gauge: 1,400 km (870 miles) (2014)

The main line runs from Port Sudan on the Sudanese coast to Khartoum via Atbara. A link also exists between Hayya and Sennar via Kassala. Other lines connect Ad-Damazin with Malakal in South Sudan and Nyala with Geneina and al-Fashir. Modest efforts to upgrade rail transport were reported to be underway in 2013 and 2015 to reverse decades of neglect and declining efficiency.

The main system, Sudan Railways, which was operated by the government-owned Sudan Railways Corporation (SRC), provided services to most of the country's production and consumption centers. The other line, the Gezira Light Railway, was owned by the Sudan Gezira Board and served the Gezira Scheme and its Manaqil Extension. In 1959 the railways made up 40% of the Sudanese gross domestic product but by 2009 only 6% of Sudan's traffic was carried by rail and since the 1970s competition from highways increased rapidly.

== Highways ==
Total: 31,000 km (19,000 miles)

Paved: 8,000 km (5,000 miles)

Unpaved: 23,000 km (14,000 miles)

Urban: 1,000 km (620 miles)

Sudan remains heavily dependent on railroads, but the road network has played an increasingly important role. Two trans-African automobile routes pass through Sudan: the Cairo-Cape Town Highway from north to south and the N'Djamena-Djibouti Highway from west to east. Estimates of the road network in 2009 ranged upwards from 55,000 kilometers, but it is an inadequate network for the size of the country. Asphalted allweather roads, excluding paved streets in cities and towns, amounted to roughly 3,600 kilometers, of which the Khartoum–Port Sudan road, the most important highway, accounted for almost 1,200 kilometers. There were about 3,740 kilometers of gravel roads and an estimated 45,000 kilometers of mainly seasonal earth roads and sand tracks, about half of which were classified as feeder roads.

The roads were generally in poor condition in 2009–10 but usable all year round, although travel might be interrupted at times during the rainy season. Most of the gravel roads in South Sudan became unusable after being heavily mined by the insurgent forces of the Sudan People's Liberation Army (SPLA).

The government favored the railroads until the early 1970s, believing that they better met the country's requirements for transportation and that the primary purpose of roads was to act as feeders to the rail system. The railroads were also a profitable government operation. Disillusion with railroad performance led to a new emphasis on roads in a readjustment of the Five-Year Plan in 1973—the so-called Interim Action Program—and a decision to encourage competition between rail and road transport as the best way to improve services. Paving of the dry-weather road between Khartoum and Port Sudan via AlGedaref and Kassala was the most significant immediate step.

Other important road-paving projects of the early 1980s included a road from Wad Madani to Sinnar and an extension from Sinnar to Kosti on the White Nile completed in 1984. Since then the paved road was extended to Umm Rawabah and Al-Obeid. A number of main gravel roads radiating from Juba were also improved. These included roads to the towns southwest of Juba and a road to the Ugandan border. In addition, the government built a gravel all-weather road east of Juba that reached the Kenyan border and connected with the Kenyan road system. All of these improvements radiating from Juba, however, were vitiated by the civil war, in which the roads were extensively mined by the SPLA and the bridges destroyed. In addition, because roads were not maintained, they deteriorated seriously.

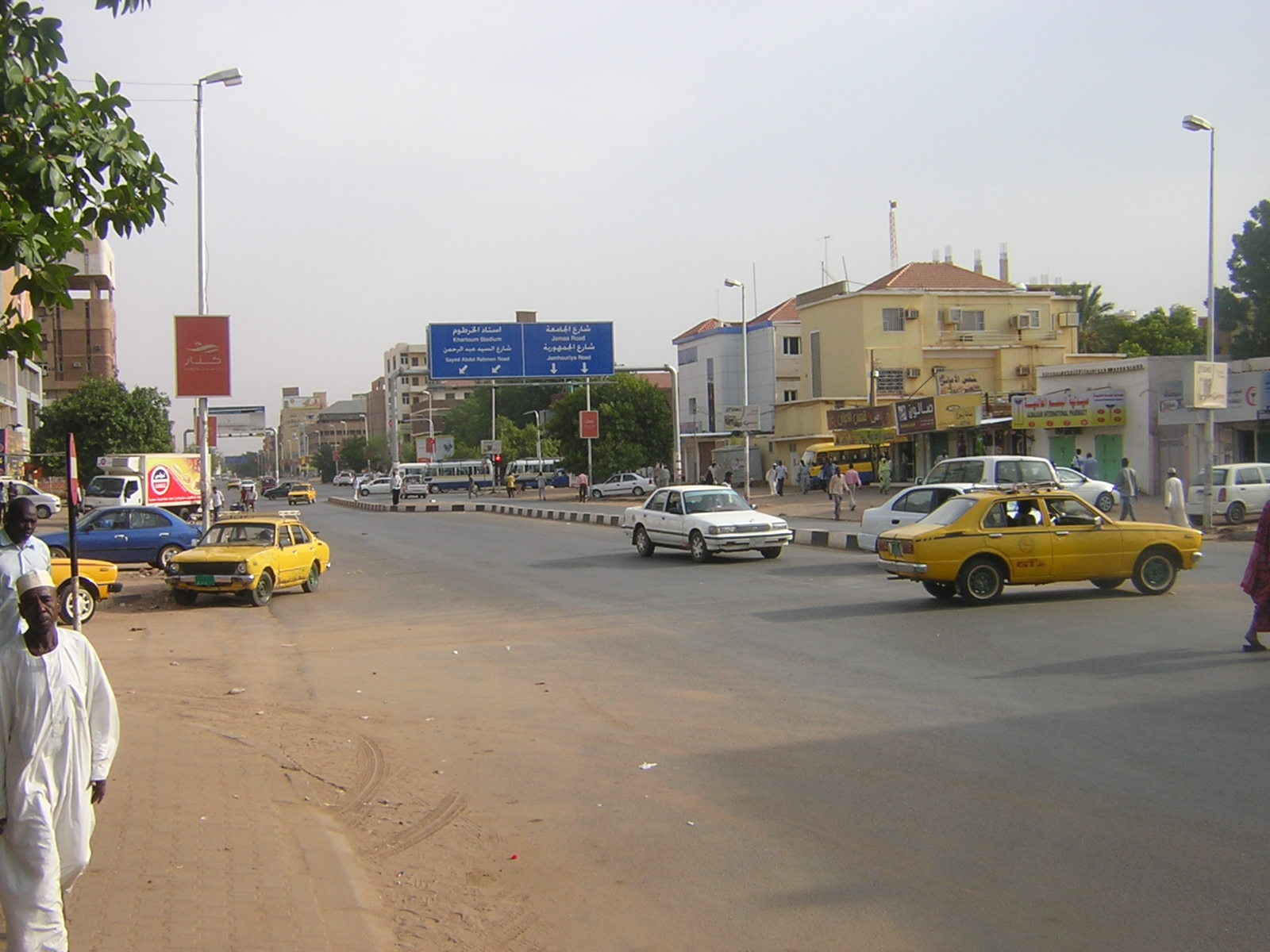
Cars on Al-Quasar Street in Khartoum in 2009

New asphalt roads to the north and south of Khartoum had been completed or were under construction in the mid-2000s, as well as new roads in the oil regions and a road linking Sudan to Chad. Grants and concessionary loans mainly from the Islamic Development Bank, the Arab Monetary Fund, and other Arab development organizations financed these projects. The highway from Al-Gedaref to Gondar in Ethiopia was refurbished and reopened in 2002 to allow expansion of trade following improvement in diplomatic ties. A newly paved highway from Port Sudan to Atbarah, funded by the Kuwait Fund for Arab Economic Development at a cost of US$110 million, reopened in 2009. It reduced travel time by several hours between Port Sudan and Khartoum. The “Northern Lifeline” Khartoum–Atbarah–Abu Hamid–Merowe road was also newly paved, open, and continued northward in 2011, and a paved road went from Khartoum to Kosti and on southward. Road transport and bus services seemed likely to increase as improved roads were extended south of Khartoum in the country's main agricultural areas.

In anticipation of the signing of the peace treaty in 2005, the World Food Programme appealed for US$64 million to clear the land mines and repair the roads in the South to facilitate the delivery of food to millions of people in the region and to allow another million people to safely return to their homes. Much work was being done to increase the network of all-weather roads there because many existing roads became impassable during the rainy season.

Other new roads under construction included access roads in the oil regions, and a road from Port Sudan to Egypt. New bridges were built over the Nile, all in Khartoum except for one that opened in 2007 in Merowe. One new road linking the North and South was planned, as part of the commitment of the CPA, although it had not been built by 2011. Construction was underway in 2009 to extend the small network of all-weather roads in the South; however, this work was still hampered by the presence of land mines.

== Inland waterways ==
The Nile River, traversing Sudan from south to north, provides an important inland transportation route. Its overall usefulness, however, has been limited by natural features, including a number of cataracts in the main Nile between Khartoum and the Egyptian border. The White Nile to the south of Khartoum has shallow stretches that restrict the carrying capacities of barges, especially during the annual period of low water, and the river has sharp bends. Most of these impediments were eliminated by Chevron, which as part of its oil exploration and development program dredged the White Nile shoals and established navigational beacons from Kosti to Bentiu. Manmade features such as the growing number of dams also restricts use of the river.

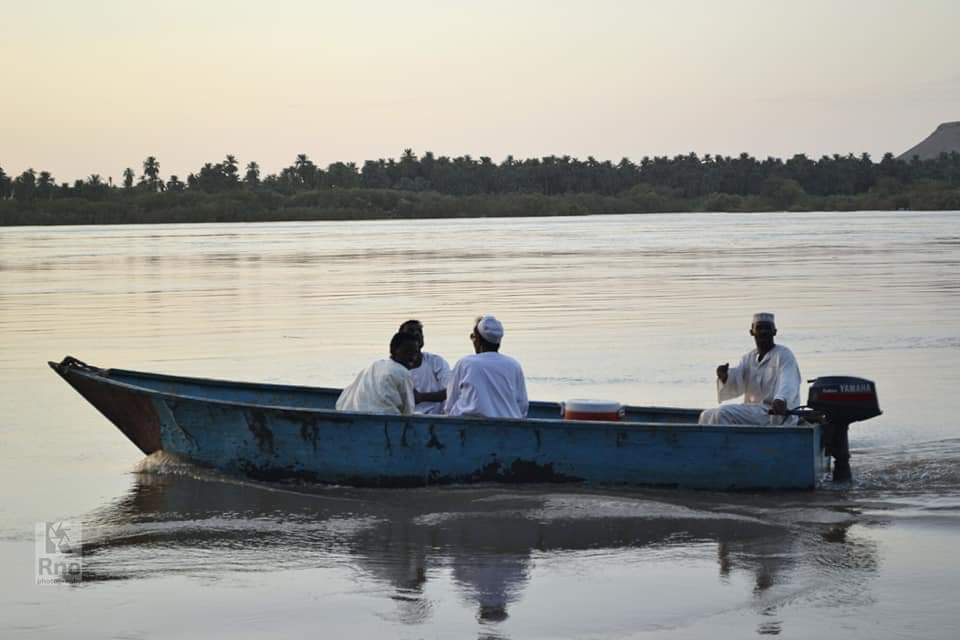

As of 2011 (before the secession of South Sudan), Sudan had 4,068 kilometers of navigable rivers overall, but only 1,723 kilometers were open throughout the year, making river transport minimal. The most important route used to be the 1,436-kilometer stretch of the White Nile from Kosti to Juba (known as the Southern Reach), which provided the only generally usable transport connection between the central and southern parts of the country. Such river traffic ended in 1984 when the SPLA regularly sank the scheduled steamers, but it began to recover following the signing of the CPA in 2005.

Transport services also ran at one time on tributaries of the White Nile (the Bahr al-Ghazal and the Jur River) to the west of Malakal. These services went as far as Wau but were seasonal, dependent on water levels. They were discontinued during the 1970s because vegetation blocked the waterways, particularly the fast-growing water hyacinth. In early 2003, a tributary of the White Nile east of Malakal, known as the Sobat River Corridor, reopened, improving the distribution of food aid in the region. On the main Nile, a 287-kilometer stretch from Kuraymah to Dongola, situated between the fourth and third cataracts and known as the Dongola Reach, also has regular service, except during the low-water period in February and March. Since 1981 the government has tried to remedy past neglect and requested foreign assistance to dredge the rivers, improve the quays, and provide navigation aids.

The River Transport Corporation (RTC) operated as a parastatal from 1973 until 2007 when two private companies, the Nile River Transport Corporation and the Sudan River Transport Corporation, took it over. Before that, the latter companies were run by the Sudan Railways Corporation essentially as feeders to the rail line. Another parastatal, the joint Sudanese-Egyptian River Navigation Corporation, operated services between Wadi Halfa and Aswan, but service often was disrupted by political tension between Egypt and Sudan. Since the privatization of the RTC, other private operators started providing services. There were six private companies operating river vessels in 2009.

The government began in 2003 to expand the Sea Ports Corporation in order for it to manage river services and river-navigation studies to qualify three new ports at Malakal, Juba, and Al-Renk. In 2006 a Kuwaiti group signed a preliminary agreement to redevelop the port of Juba on the White Nile.

River cargo and passenger traffic varies from year to year, depending in large part on the availability and capacity of transport vessels. During the 1970s, roughly 100,000 tonnes of cargo and 250,000 passengers were carried annually. However, the closing of the Southern Reach in 1984 made river traffic insignificant. Cargo had declined to fewer than 44,000 tonnes and passengers to fewer than 5,000 per year by the early 2000s, but by 2010, inland waterways transported 114,000 tonnes and 13,000 passengers despite rapids, cataracts, a growing number of dams, and seasonal variations in water levels that continued to hinder river traffic.

== Aviation ==
In mid-1991, scheduled domestic air service was provided by Sudan Airways, a government-owned enterprise operated by the Sudan Airways Company. The company began its operations in 1947 as a government department. It has operated commercially since the late 1960s, in effect holding a monopoly on domestic service. In 1991 Sudan Airways had scheduled flights from Khartoum to twenty other domestic airports, although it did not always adhere to its schedules. It also provided international services to several European countries, including: Britain, Germany, Greece, and Italy. Regional flights were made to North Africa and the Middle East as well as to: Chad, Ethiopia, Kenya, Nigeria, and Uganda. The Sudan Airways fleet in 1991 consisted of thirteen aircraft, including five Boeing 707s used on international flights, two Boeing 737s and two Boeing 727s employed in domestic and regional services, and four Fokker F-27s used for domestic flights.

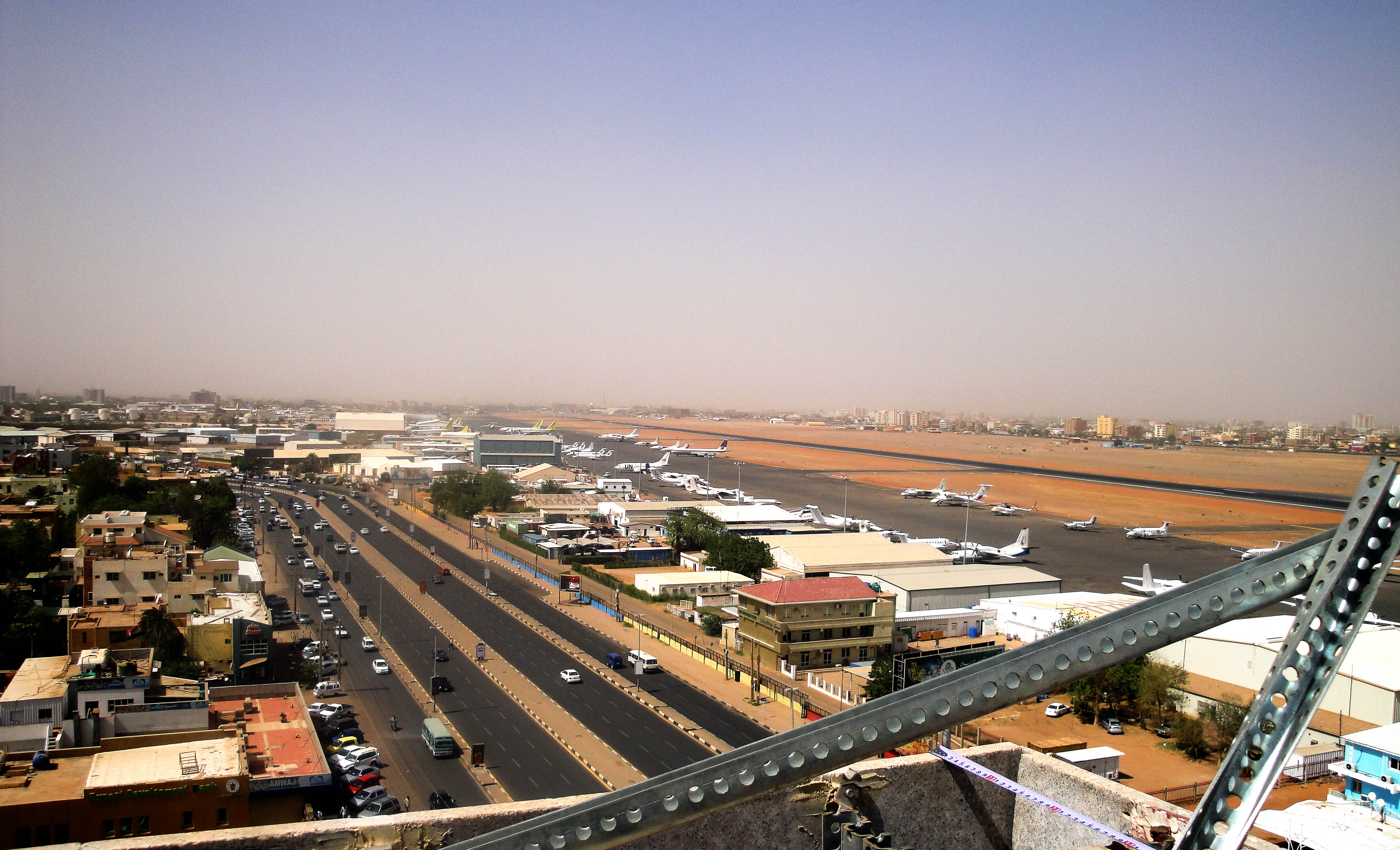
An aerial view of Khartoum Airport in 2011

Sixteen international airlines provided regular flights to Khartoum. The number of domestic and international passengers increased from about 478,000 in 1982 to about 485,000 in 1984. Air freight increased from 6 million tons per kilometer in 1982 to 7.7 million tons per kilometer in 1984. As compared with the previous year, in 1989 passenger traffic on Sudan Airways fell by 32% to 363,181 people, reducing the load factor to 34.9%. By contrast, freight volume increased by 63.7% to 12,317 tons. At the end of 1979, Sudan Airways had entered into a pooling agreement with Britain's Tradewinds Airways to furnish charter cargo service between that country and Khartoum under a subsidiary company, Sudan Air Cargo. A new cargo terminal was built at Khartoum.

Sudan Airways's operations have generally shown losses, and in the early 1980s the corporation was reportedly receiving an annual government subsidy of about £S.500,000. In 1987 the government proposed to privatize Sudan Airways, precipitating a heated controversy that ultimately led to a joint venture between the government and private interests. However, like the railroads and river transport operators Sudan Airways suffered from a shortage of skilled personnel, overstaffing, and lacked hard currency and credit for spare parts and proper maintenance.

In the early 1980s, the country's civilian airports, with the exception of Khartoum International Airport and the airport at Juba, sometimes closed during rainy periods because of runway conditions. After the 1986 drought, which caused major problems at regional airports, the government launched a program to improve runways, to be funded locally. Aeronautical communications and navigational aids were minimal and at some airports relatively primitive. Only Khartoum International Airport was equipped with modern operational facilities, but by the early 1990s, Khartoum and seven other airports had paved runways. In the mid-1970s, IDA and the Saudi Development Fund agreed to make funds available for construction of new airports at Port Sudan and Wau, reconstruction and improvement of the airport at Malakal, and substantial upgrading of the Juba airport; these four airports accounted for almost half of domestic traffic. Because the civil war had resumed, improvements were made only at Port Sudan. Juba airport runways were rebuilt by a loan from the European Development Fund, but the control tower and navigational equipment remained incomplete.

Sudan's aircraft registration prefix is "ST".

=== Airports with paved runways ===
Total: 17

over 3,047 m (9,997 feet)3,047 m: 2

2,438 to 3,047 m (7,999 to 9,997 feet): 11

1,524 to 2,437 m (5,000 to 7,995 feet): 2

914 to 1,523 m (2,999 to 4,997 feet): 1

under 914 m (2,999 feet)914 m: 1 (2020)

=== Airports with unpaved runways ===
Total: 50

1,524 to 2,437 m (5,000 to 7,995 feet): 17

914 to 1,523 m (2,999 to 4,997 feet): 24

under 914 m (2,999 feet): 9 (2020)

== Ports and shipping ==
In 1990, Sudan had only one operational deep-water harbor, Port Sudan, situated on an inlet of the Red Sea. The port had been built from scratch, beginning in 1905, to complement the railroad line from Khartoum to the Red Sea by serving as the entry and exit point for the foreign trade the rail line was to carry. It operated as a department of SRC until 1974 when it was transferred to the Sea Ports Corporation, a newly established public enterprise set up to manage Sudan's marine ports. Facilities at the port eventually included fifteen cargo berths, sheds, warehouses, and storage tanks for edible oils, molasses, and petroleum products. Equipment included quay, mobile, and other cranes, and some forklift trucks, but much of the handling of cargo was manual. There were also a number of tugboats, which were used to berth ships in the narrow inlet.

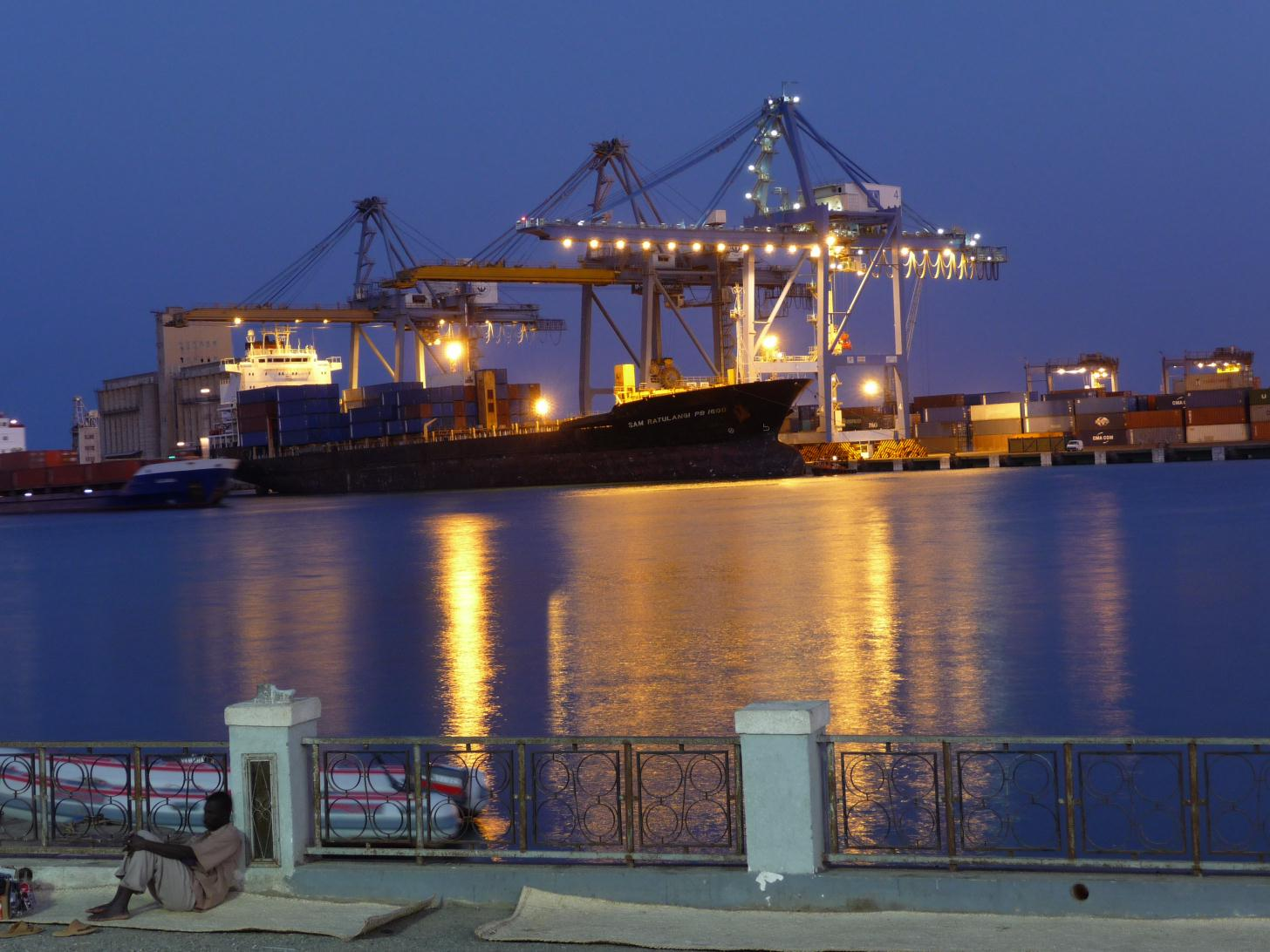
A ship at the container terminal of Port Sudan

During the early 1970s, port traffic averaged about 3 million tons a year, compared with an overall capacity of about 3.8 million tons. Exports were somewhat more than 1 million tons and imports about 2 million tons; about half of the latter was petroleum and petroleum products. By the mid-1970s, stepped up economic development had raised traffic to capacity levels. However, in 1985, largely as a result of the civil war, exports were down to 663 thousand tons (down 51% from the previous year) and imports were 2.3 million tons (down 25% from the previous year). Physical expansion of the harbor and adjacent areas was generally precluded by natural features and the proximity of the city of Port Sudan. However, surveys showed that use could be increased considerably by modernization and improvement of existing facilities and the addition of further cargo-handling equipment. In 1978, with the assistance of a loan from the IDA, work began on adding deep-water berths and providing roll-on-roll-off container facilities. A loan to purchase equipment was made by a West German body. The first phase was completed in 1982, and the second phase began in 1983, aided by a US$25-million World Bank credit. One of the major improvements has been to make the port more readily usable by road vehicles. Developed almost entirely as a rail-serviced facility, the port had large areas of interlacing railroad tracks that were mostly not flush with surrounding surfaces, thereby greatly restricting vehicular movement. Many of these tracks have been removed and new access roads constructed. Much of the cleared area has become available for additional storage facilities.

In the early 1980s, the Nimeiri government announced a plan to construct a new deep-water port at Sawakin, about twenty kilometers south of Port Sudan. Construction of a new port had long been under consideration in response to the projected growth of port traffic in the latter part of the twentieth century. A detailed study for the proposed port was made by a West German firm in the mid-1970s, and plans were drawn up for three general cargo berths, including roll-on-roll-off container facilities, and an oil terminal. Major funding for the port, known as Sawakin, was offered in 1985 by West Germany's development agency Kreditanstalt für Wiederaufbau and the DFC. After the Nimeiri government repeatedly postponed work on the port, the German government allocated the funds instead for purchase of agricultural inputs. Once work resumed, however, Sawakin port opened in January 1991, and was capable of handling an estimated 1.5 million tons of cargo a year.

=== Merchant marine ===
Total: 2 cargo ships (1,000 GT or over) totaling 38,093 GT/49,727 tonnes deadweight (DWT) (2010)

The national merchant marine, Sudan Shipping Line, was established in 1962 as a joint venture between the government and Yugoslavia. In 1967 it became wholly government owned. From the initial two Yugoslav-built cargo vessels, the line had grown by the mid-1970s to seven ships, totaling about 52,340 deadweight tons. During 1979 and early 1980, eight more ships were added, including six built in Yugoslavia and two in Denmark. In 1990 the merchant marine consisted of ten ships of 122,200 deadweight tons. The Yugoslav vessels were all multipurpose and included container transport features. The Danish ships were equipped with roll-on-roll-off facilities. Sailings, which had been mainly between Red Sea ports and northern Europe, were expanded in the late 1980s to several Mediterranean ports.

=== Regulations ===
Building on the development of Sudan's merchant marine and its integration into international shipping routes, the country has introduced tighter regulatory controls over incoming cargo. Since 1 January 2026 the Sudanese Customs Authority, in coordination with the Sea Ports Corporation, has enforced the mandatory use of the Advance Cargo Declaration (ACD) system, also known as the Electronic Cargo Tracking Note.

Under this system, all shipments bound for Sudan must obtain an ACD certificate prior to loading at the port of origin. The certificate generates a unique reference number, which must be included on the bill of lading and validated before the vessel's arrival.

The ACD functions as a pre-arrival declaration and tracking mechanism, providing Sudanese authorities with detailed information about the cargo, vessel, and shipment documents. Failure to comply with these requirements can result in fines, delays, or the rejection or seizure of cargo.

== Pipelines ==
Gas: 56 km (35 miles)

Oil: 4,070 km (2,530 miles)

Refined products: 1,613 km (1,002 miles) (2013)

By the early 1970s, operational problems on the Port Sudan-Khartoum section of Sudan Railways had resulted in inadequate supplies of petroleum products reaching Khartoum and other parts of the country. In 1975 construction of an oil pipeline from the port to Khartoum was begun to relieve traffic pressure on the railroad. It was completed in mid-1976, but leaks were discovered and the long pipeline, laid generally parallel to the railroad, did not become operational until September 1977. As constructed, its capacity was 600,000 tons a year, but that throughput was only attained in mid-1981. In early 1982, steps were taken to add additional booster pumping stations to increase the rate to an annual throughput capacity of 1 million tons. The line carried only refined products, including gasoline, gas oil, kerosene, and aviation fuel obtained either from the refinery at the port or from import-holding facilities there. These fuels were moved in a continuous operation to storage tanks at Khartoum with some capacity offloaded at Atbarah. Rail tank cars released by the pipeline were reassigned to increase supplies of petroleum products in the western and southwestern regions of the country.
