= Dongola Airport =

Airport in Sudan

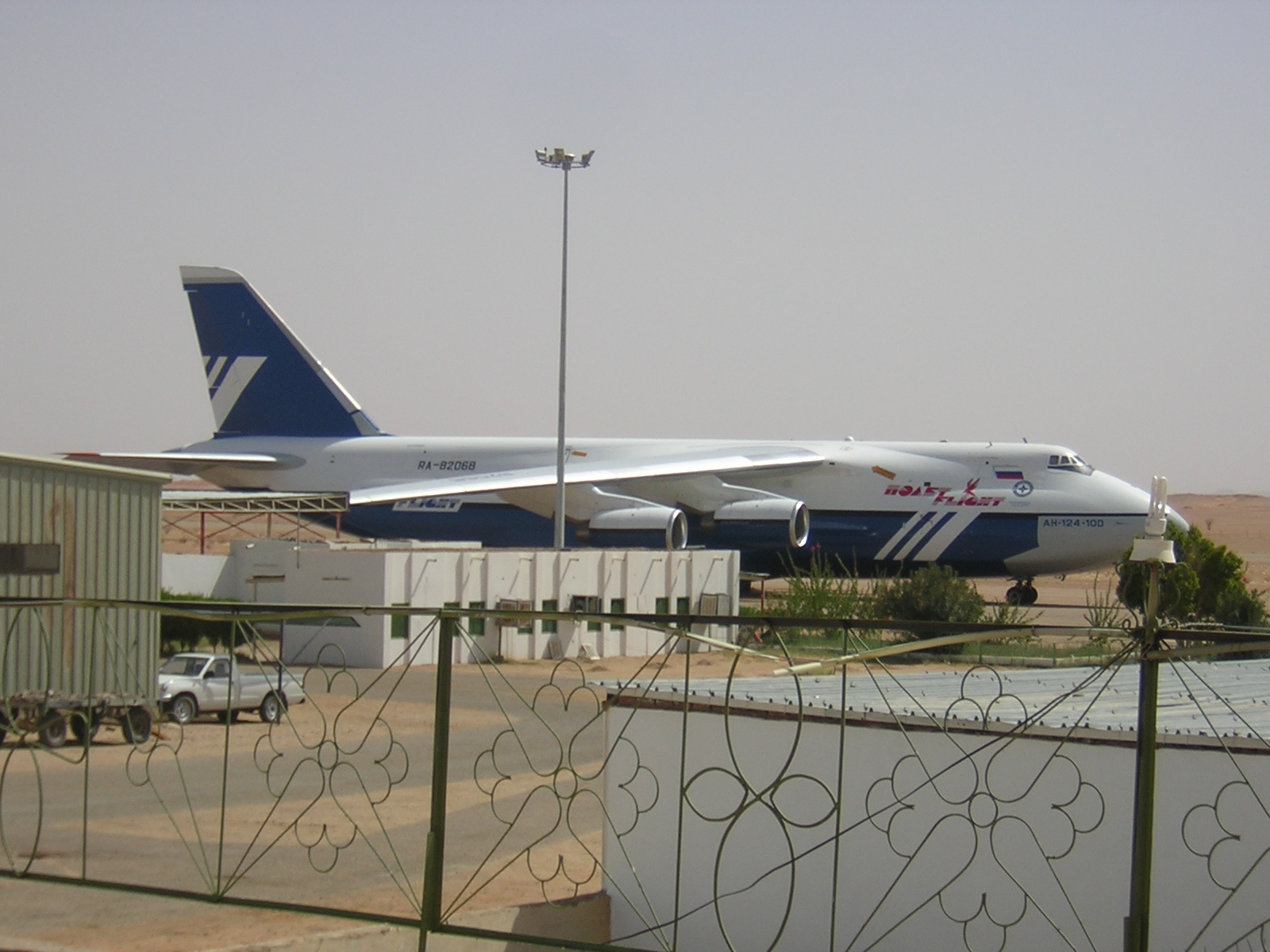
- IATA: DOG; ICAO: HSDN

Summary
- Airport type: Public
- Serves: Dongola, Sudan
- Elevation AMSL: 773 ft (236 m)
- Coordinates: 19°09′13″N 030°25′48″E

Map
- Location within Sudan

Runways
Direction	Length		Surface
Direction	m	ft	Surface
17/35	3,000	9,843	Asphalt
- Source: DAFIF

Dongola Airport (IATA: DOG, ICAO: HSDN; Arabic: مطار دنقلا) is an airport serving Dongola, the capital city of the Northern state in Sudan.

== History ==
During the Sudanese civil war (2023–present), the airport was attacked with drones by the Rapid Support Forces on 7 April 2025, destroying a fuel storage facility.

== Facilities ==
The airport resides at an elevation of 773 feet (236 m) above mean sea level. It has one runway designated 17/35 with an asphalt surface measuring 3,000 by 45 metres (9,843 ft × 148 ft).

== Airlines and destinations ==
Airlines	Destinations
Nova Airways	Khartoum (suspended)
Tarco Aviation	Port Sudan
