= Sea Ports Corporation, Sudan =

Company

Sea Ports Corporation (SPC)
- هيئة الموانئ البحرية

Agency overview
- Formed: 1974
- Jurisdiction: Sudan
- Agency executives: Jalaladdine Mohamed Sheila, Director General; Capt. Omer Satti Mohamed, Maritime Administration Directorate; Capt. Mahmoud Sid Ahmed, Maritime operation Directorate
- Website: sudanports.gov.sd

Sea Ports Corporation is an independent state corporation of Sudan that governs, constructs and maintains the ports and harbours and lighthouses of Sudan. The company was founded in 1974 by the government of Sudan to be the national port operator and port authority.

== Ports ==
Sea Ports Corporation operates and governs the following ports of Sudan:

=== Port Sudan ===
The Port of Port Sudan in Red Sea State is composed of three ports: the Northern Port, which handles petroleum products, containers and bulk grain; the Southern Port, handling edible oils, molasses, cement; and Green Harbor on the east side of Port Sudan, which handles dry bulk cargo, seeds and containers.

=== Al Khair ===
The Al Khair Petroleum Terminal was completed in 2003, at Port Sudan.

=== Osman Digna ===
The Port of Prince Osman Digna at Suakin has three berths serving cargo ships and passenger ships, and a liquefied petroleum gas terminal. With a length of 100.40 meters, next to the arrival hall, it is designated for ship agents to store passengers' luggage, and often cruises and passenger ships to and from the Kingdom of Saudi Arabia.

=== El Zubir ===
The Marshal Alzubeer Mohammed Salih Port at the junction of Lake Nasser and the Nile River at Wadi Halfa was rehabilitated, and commissioned in 2001.

== See also ==
- Red Sea
- Transport in Sudan
- Port authority
- Port operator
