= List of ports in Sudan =

This list of Ports and harbours in Sudan details the ports, harbours around the coast of Sudan.

== List of ports and harbours in Sudan ==
Port/Harbour name	State	Town name	Coordinates	UN/Locode	Max. draught (m)	Max. deadweight (t)	Remarks
Port of Port Sudan	Port Sudan	Red Sea State	19°37′N 37°12′E	SDPZU	13.9	83353	Medium-sized port, also known as Port of Port Soudan. Sudan's main seaport and the source of 90% of the country's international trade.
Port of Digna	Suakin	Red Sea State	19°07′N 37°20′E	SDSWA	6.4	12020	Medium-sized port, also known as port of Sawakin, Suakin, Prince Osman Digna, Osman Digna.
Port of Marsa Bashayer	Port Sudan	Red Sea State	19°23′N 37°19′E	SDMBH	9.5	162187	Medium-sized port, also known as Bashayer Terminal.
