= Sudapak =

Sudan petroleum company

Sudapak Operating Company is a petroleum company operating in Sudan. It is affiliated with Zaver Petroleum of Pakistan and is currently active in oil and gas exploration, in association with Sudapet, the national oil company of Sudan. Sudapak is based in Khartoum.
