= National Bank of Sudan =

Sudanese bank

- Type: Private company
- Industry: Financial services
- Founded: 1981; 45 years ago
- Headquarters: Khartoum, Sudan
- Area served: Sudan
- Key people: Marwan Hassan Ali Alkhatib (Chairman) Mohamed Ahmed Abdelmajid Ali(General Manager)
- Products: Banking services
- Owner: Bank Audi (75%)
- Website: nbs.sd

The National Bank of Sudan is a Sudanese commercial bank located in Khartoum. The bank was formed in 1981.

== History ==
The bank was established in 1981 by a group of Sudanese businessmen.

In July 2006, the Lebanon's Bank Audi acquired 75% of the value of the stock and signed an agreement between National Bank of Sudan and Lebanon's Bank Audi at the Friendship Hall to enter a partnership. In the partnership Bank Audi, a strategic partner of the National Bank rate 75% of the Bank shares, raised capital to the National Bank 72 million U.S. dollars.

== Banking system ==
After the signing of the Comprehensive Peace Agreement between the Sudanese Government and the Popular Movement for the Liberation of Sudan after 25 years of the Second Sudanese Civil War in southern Sudan, the Central Bank of Sudan Act (Amendment) Act 2006 was issued. There is a dual Sudanese banking system, an Islamic one in the north of Sudan and the other traditional in southern Sudan.

In 2006, the National Bank of Sudan was considered one of the strongest banks operating in Sudan, after the administration had been run by Lebanon's Banque Audi, which has about 76.56% in 2008. It was expected to change the name of the bank to Audi Al-Ahli Bank but this did not occur.

== Branches ==
Branch Name	Manager	Address
Khartoum	Abeer Hassan Hamid	National Bank of Sudan HQ, Qasr Avenue, Khartoum
Portsudan	Ibrahim Ahmed Ibrahim	Building no.2, Portsudan market near Al-Baladiya Gardens

== See also ==
- List of banks in Sudan
- Central Bank of Sudan
