= White Nile Petroleum Operating Company =

Petroleum company

White Nile Petroleum Operating Company (WNPOC)
- Company type: Joint venture
- Industry: Oil & Gas
- Founded: 2001
- Headquarters: Khartoum, Sudan
- Products: Oil

The White Nile Petroleum Operating Company (WNPOC) is a petroleum exploration and production company operating in Sudan. It was incorporated in 2001. Production is expected to increase to 500,000 barrels of oil per day by the end of 2006, following the completion of a pipeline in April 2006 linking South Sudan's oil fields to Khartoum and Port Sudan.

== Stakeholders and partners ==
WNPOC is a joint operating company owned by:

- Petronas Carigall Overseas of Malaysia: 50%
- Sudapet of Sudan: 50%

WNPOC operates in partnership with these other companies:

- ONGC Videsh (the overseas arm of ONGC) of India
- Lundin Petroleum of Sweden
- Hi Tech Petroleum

== See also ==
- Economy of Sudan
