= Nile Petroleum Corporation =

South Sudan national oil and gas company

- Industry: Oil and gas industry
- Founded: 2005
- Headquarters: Juba, South Sudan
- Key people: Hon. Emmanuel Athiei Ayual, Managing Director and Chief Executive Officer
- Products: Petroleum
- Website: nilepet.com

The Nile Petroleum Corporation (Nilepet) is the national oil and gas company of South Sudan. It was incorporated in 2009 by the government of Sudan and transferred to the government of South Sudan in 2011. Nilepet is the successor company in South Sudan to Sudapet, the national oil and gas company of Sudan.

== Corporate overview ==
Nilepet is involved in the exploration, development, and production of oil, natural gas, and hydrocarbons in South Sudan. It is also responsible for the regulation of the petroleum industry, regulating fuel imports, the storage of petroleum productions (crude and refined), and the distribution of gasoline and diesel fuel.

Beginning in 2013, Nilepet and various multinational firms created joint ventures to build expertise in various aspects of the petroleum industry. These include Nile Drilling, a drilling contractor; Nile Delta Petroleum Company, a national natural gas grid and marketing company that also redevelops brownfields; SIPET, an engineering consulting firm; Nile Services and Logistic Company; Nile-Delta Systems, an information and communications technology (ICT) business; SNP Group, dedicated to building refinery capacity in the nation; Dietsmann Nile, a petroleum technology company; and NIYAT, a firm that specializes in road construction and maintenance in oilfields.

As of 2019, Nilepet had no refineries, and none existed in the country. It imported all its refined petroleum products.

== Corporate history ==
Nile Petroleum Corporation was incorporated in 2009 under the authority of the Comprehensive Peace Agreement that ended the Second Sudanese Civil War (1985—2003). After the 2011 South Sudanese independence referendum led to the creation of South Sudan in 2011, and transferred to the government of South Sudan. Nilepet is the successor to Sudapet, the national oil and gas company of Sudan.

Several areas in South Sudan were already producing oil in 2011. These included Blocks 1, 2, 4, 5A, and 6 in the Muglad Basin in the state of Unity and the Ruweng Administrative Area; Blocks 3 and 7 in the Melut Basin of the state of Upper Nile; Block 3E in the Palogue oil field in Upper Nile; and Block 7E in the Adar oil field (both Upper Nile). Production in Unity state largely ceased during the Second Sudanese Civil War. After the war ended, foreign oil companies began exploration in Block B2 and B3 in Jonglei State.

After a series of Managing Directors, each of whom only the held job a short time, Dr. Chol Deng Thon Abel was appointed Managing Director in September 2017. In August 2020, Nilepet announced it would conduct a nationwide oil and mineral survey to boost both exploration and production. The South Sudanese government said that 90 percent of the nation had not been surveyed, and that 14 new oil blocks would be auctioned off for lease by the end of the year.

Dr. Chol stepped down in September 2020, and South Sudanese President Salva Kiir named Bol Ring Mourwel Kon, the president of Nile Drilling, as his successor. Under Bol, Nilepet said it would own its own block by 2022, and would construct four refineries. The company also announced plans to build an extensive strategic oil reserve, and to expand its fuel stations to all major cities in the nation. It hoped to be a fully integrated petroleum company by 2027, one which no longer needed outside technical expertise or skilled workers.

In October 2021, hundreds of Nilepet workers signed an open letter accusing Bol and many in his management team of extreme corruption, managerial incompetence, and nepotism to such an extent that Nilepet was close to bankruptcy and collapse. President Kiir dismissed Bol and appointed Dr. Chol to the position of Managing Director.

Dr. Chol announced in February 2022 that Nilepet still intended to take over exploration, development, and production of some blocks in the Palogue oil field by 2027 when the leases with foreign corporations expire. The company believed it could expand production, which had fallen to about 140,000 barrels of oil per day (bpd) from the previous high of 300,000 bpd.

On January 13, 2023, South Sudan President Kiir abruptly removed Dr. Chol and announced that Bernard Amuor Makeny, an engineer with a master's degree in oil and gas management from the University of Liverpool, would take over as the company's managing director.

Nilepet acquired the South Sudan oil fields and gas assets from Petronas on 19 August 2024.

On 23 August 2024, Nilpet signed an agreement with Shengli Oilfield Keer Engineering and Construction Company (Sokec) for the construction of modern oil refinery and storage facilities in South Sudan.

In September 2024, Nilepet signed a memorandum of understanding (MoU) with Wildcat Petroleum plc for the newly acquired assets from Petronas.

In October 2024, Ayuel Ngor Kacgor was appointed to the position of managing director of Nilepet.
