= Green Flag Aviation =

Sudanese airline

Green Flag Aviation Co. Ltd.
IATA	ICAO	Call sign
-	GNF	Green Flag Air
- Fleet size: 15
- Website: http://www.greenflag-sdn.com/

Green Flag Aviation Co. Ltd. is an inoperative air transport service company based in Khartoum, Sudan, established in 1992.

The company was added to the EU list of banned air carriers on 30 March 2010.

As of January 2026, the airline has a status of "Idle".

== Fleet ==
Green Flag's fleet consists of:

- 2 Antonov An-74
- 1 Ilyushin Il-76 (cargo)
- 5 Mil Mi-17
- 1 Antonov An-30
- 1 Lockheed Jetstar
- 2 Bell-205
- 1 Dassault Falcon 50
- 1 Boeing 737 (Cargo)
