= Balad Bank =

- Native name: مصرف البلد
- Company type: Public
- Industry: Financial services
- Founded: 1983
- Headquarters: Khartoum, Sudan
- Services: Banking
- Website: baladbank.net

The Balad Bank (Arabic: مصرف البلد), founded in 1983 as Al Shamal Islamic Bank, is one of the major financial institutions of Sudan, and one of the leading Islamic banks worldwide. The bank changed its brand to Balad Bank August 3, 2018.

In 2019 the bank has changed its name to "Balad Bank".

== Shareholders ==
According to public records, among the investors in the Al Shamal Islamic Bank include a Geneva-based financial services conglomerate headed by Mohammed al Faisal, son of the late King Faisal.

The bank itself that among its five "main founders" and principal shareholders is another Khartoum bank, the Faisal Islamic Bank of Sudan. According to public records, 19 percent of the Faisal Islamic Bank is owned by the Dar Al-Maal Al-Islami Trust, or simply DMI Trust, also headed by Prince Faisal. The $3.5 billion DMI Trust, whose slogan is "Allah is the purveyor of success," was founded in 1981 to foster the spread of Islamic banking across the Muslim world. Its 12-member board of directors includes Haydar Mohamed Bin Laden, a half-brother of Osama bin Laden, according to a DMI spokesman.

Other shareholders include:

- Adel Batterjee, also chairman as recently as 2002.
- Al Baraka Investment and Development Corporation

== See also ==
- List of banks
- List of banks in Sudan
