= Al Jazeera Sudanese Jordanian Bank =

Sudanese commercial bank

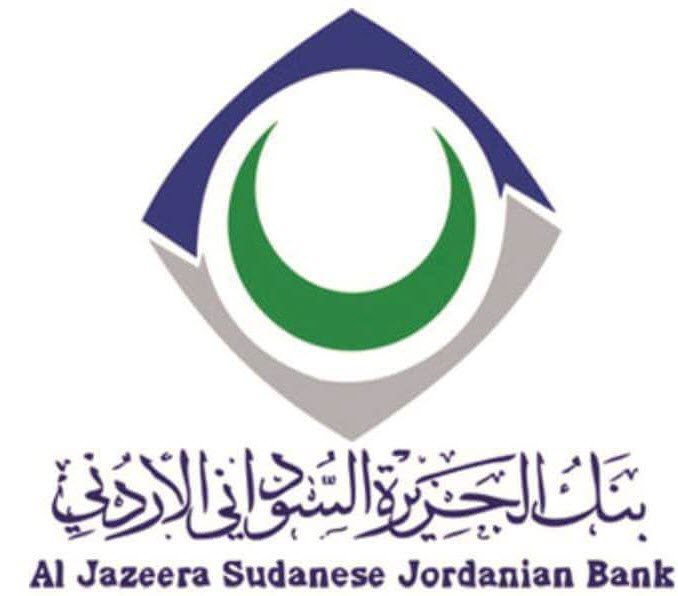
- Company type: Public limited company
- Industry: Finance
- Founded: 17 August 2006
- Headquarters: Khartoum, Sudan
- Area served: Sudan
- Products: Banking, financial and related services
- Number of employees: 200-500
- Website: www.aljazeerabank.com.sd/en

Al Jazeera Sudanese Jordanian Bank is a Sudanese-Jordanian public limited company which is listed on the Khartoum Stock Exchange and it operates in accordance with the provisions of Islamic Sharia principles when it comes to banking transactions. The bank also plays an active role in the process of economic and social development in Sudan. The bank is headquartered in Khartoum, the capital city of Sudan.

The bank was established on 17 August 2006 under the Sudanese Companies Law of 1925 and received a license to operate as a full-fledged bank from the Central Bank of Sudan. The bank was listed on the Karthoum Stock Exchange on 5 February 2014. Al Jazeera Sudanese Jordanian Bank is regarded as one of the largest banks in Sudan.

The bank was a victim of the ongoing 2023 Sudanese war as the building infrastructure caught fire amid violent clashes.
