= Sudapet =

State-owned oil company based in Sudan

Coordinates: 15°33′39″N 32°33′6″E

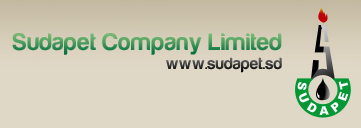
- Type: Government-owned
- Founded: 1997
- Founder: Government of Sudan
- Headquarters: , Khartoum, Sudan
- Key people: Awad Alkarim (Director General)
- Website: sudapet.sd

The Sudan National Petroleum Corporation, also known as Sudapet, is a state-owned oil company based in Sudan. It was founded in 1997 and is 100% owned by the Ministry for Energy and Mining (later the Ministry of Petroleum and Gas).

As a NOC, Sudapet has equities varying from 5% to 70% in the licensed petroleum concessions in Sudan with other foreign shareholders, in addition to a large range of petroleum associated services subsidiaries.

From 2006 to 2015, Sudapet is not active in oil exploitation, but rather serves to manage revenues the Sudanese government receives from its concessions to foreign operators. At the same time there have been efforts within the government and among the company's principles to develop the resources and know-how to transform Sudapet into a fully self-sufficient enterprise in the oil exploitation space.

== History ==
Sudapet was founded in 1997, and operated in the north of Sudan, while another state company, Nilepet, operated out of southern Sudan.

In 2011, the Sudanese government raised complaints that president of south Sudan had seized shares of Sudapet amounting to $2 billion. According to Sudapet, Salva Kiir ordered the shares be transferred to Nilepet.

In response to the military overthrow of the government, in 2021, workers at Sudapet said they would join a civil disobedience movement called by trade unions.

In November 1997, the United States imposed sanctions against Sudan on the basis that profits from oil were being used to fuel the civil war. In February 2000, the US government extended its sanctions to include Sudapet and the Greater Nile Petroleum Operating Company (GNPOC). This was a contentious move in that Canadian international Talisman Energy was a 25% shareholder in GNPOC.

Later in September 2017, the United States lifted long-standing economic sanctions against Sudan.

== Projects ==
The company is a minority stakeholder in all of its exploitation and development projects. Its activities break down as follows:

Year started	partner	project	Block	Activity
1995	CNPCIS	5%	6	New contract 2003, construction of a pipeline from Al-Fulah to Khartoum with a capacity of 200,000 barrels per day (32,000 m^{3}/d), in production since 2004
1996	GNPOC	5%	1,2,4	building of a pipeline from Heglig to Port Sudan, exploration, producing 50,000 barrels per day (7,900 m^{3}/d) since 1999, 290,000 per day since July 2004, planned production of 500,000 per day by 2006 (delayed due to technical difficulties)
1996/1997	WNPOC	7%	5A	exploration since 1999
2000	PDOC	8%	3,7	
2001	WNPOC	11%	5B	exploration since 2006
2003	WNPOC	15%	8	seismic exploration as of July, 2004
2003	Sudapak	15%	9	exploration 2004
2003	APCO	17%	C	seismic exploration since 2004

Oil and Gas Concessions in Sudan - 2004

Acronyms:
CNPCIS:renamed to 'Petro Energy E & P'
GNPOC:Greater Nile Petroleum Operating Company
PDOC:Petrodar Operating Company
WNPOC:White Nile Petroleum Operating Company
Sudapak:Sudapak Industrial Corporation
APCO:Advanced Petroleum Company
RSPOC:Red Sea Petroleum Operating Company
CPOC:Coral Petroleum Operating Company
GSPOC:Great Sahara Petroleum Operating Company
BNPOC:Blue Nile Petroleum Operating Company
ASE:Al-Sudan Energia Petroleum Operating Company
SOPOC:Star Oil Petroleum Operating Company
RPOC:Rawat Petroleum Operating Company

== See also ==
- Sudan Khartoum Refinery Company
