= Mid Airlines =

Sudanese charter airline

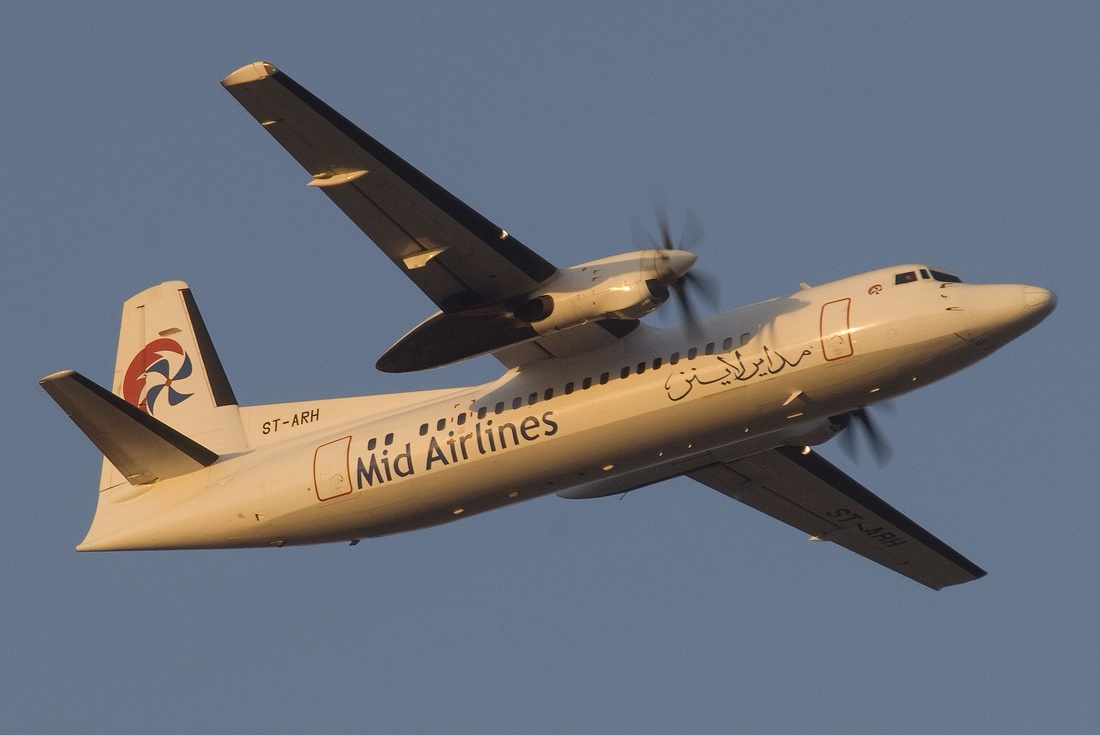
- Mid Airlines Fokker 50
IATA	ICAO	Call sign
7Y	NYL	NILE
- Founded: 2002
- Hubs: Khartoum International Airport
- Fleet size: 2
- Headquarters: Khartoum, Sudan
- Website: http://www.midairlines.com/

Mid Airlines is a charter airline based in Khartoum, Sudan. It operates domestic passenger services. Its main base is Khartoum International Airport.It is currently banned from flying in the EU airspace like all other Sudan airlines.

== History ==
The airline was established in 2002 and started operations in May 2003.

== Destinations ==
Mid Airlines operates scheduled domestic destinations to Khartoum, Rumbek, and Port Sudan (as of January 2005), although it appears as of June 2016 that this is no longer the case and that the airline presently offers an array of domestic and international charter services.

== Fleet ==
The Mid Airlines fleet includes the following aircraft (as of August 2013):

- 2 Fokker 50
