= Nova Airways =

Sudanese airline

IATA	ICAO	Call sign
O9	NOV	NOVANILE
- Founded: 2011
- Hubs: Khartoum Airport
- Fleet size: 2
- Destinations: 6
- Headquarters: Khartoum, Sudan
- Key people: Capt. Widaa M. Nour CEO and Managing Director - Mr. Kalafallah (Chief Commercial Officer)
- Website: www.novaairways.com

Nova Airways, formerly Nova Airlines from 2006 to 2011, is a passenger airline based in Khartoum, Sudan. It is currently banned the EU airspace.

== Destinations ==
Sudan

- Dongola - Dongola Airport
- El Fasher - El Fasher Airport
- Khartoum - Khartoum International Airport Main Hub
- Merowe - Merowe Airport
- Nyala - Nyala Airport
- Port Sudan - Port Sudan New International Airport

== Fleet ==
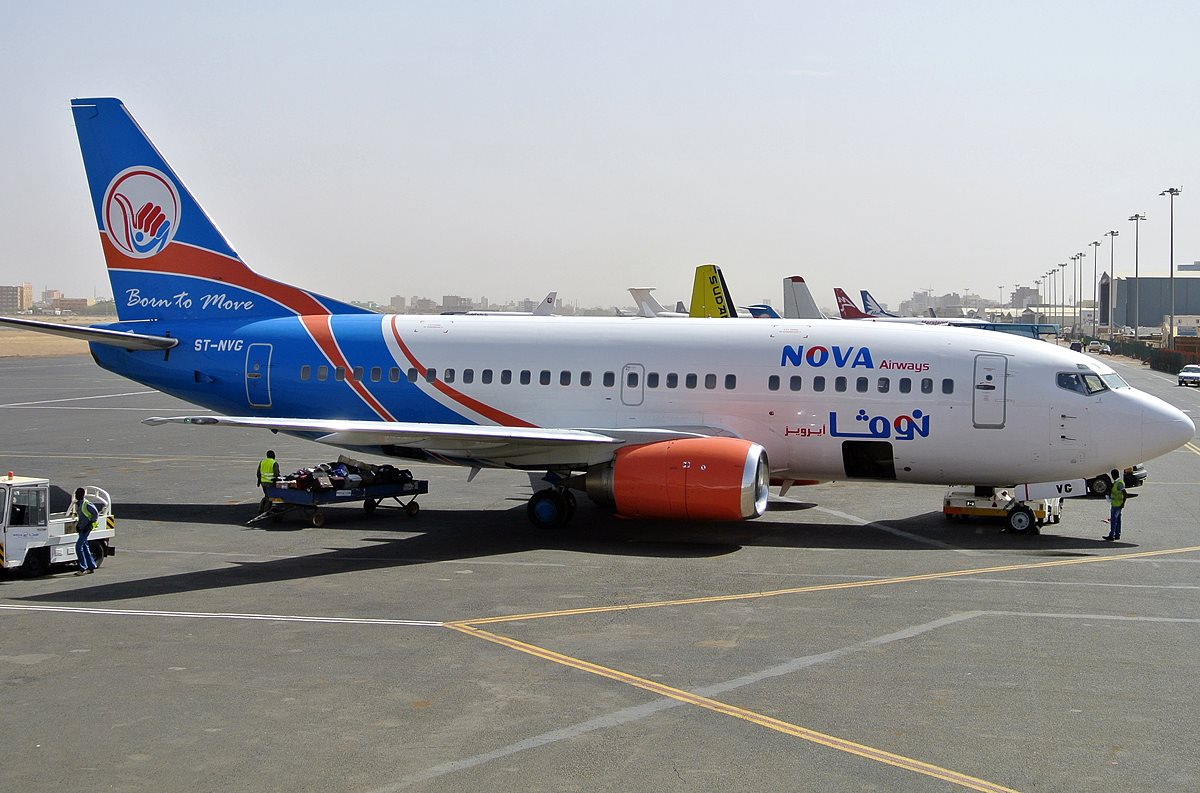
Nova Airways Boeing 737-500

As of August 2025, Nova Airways operates the following aircraft:

Nova Airlines fleet
Aircraft	In fleet	Orders	Passengers
Bombardier CRJ200ER	2	—	50
Total	2	0	

== Incidents ==
On 19 December 2013, a Nova Airways Boeing 737-500 registration ST-NVG suffered nose-gear collapse resulting in major damage when landing at Juba. This was the same day that many people were being evacuated from Juba because of the South Sudanese Civil War. The Nova Airways aircraft blocked the runway for several hours, delaying the evacuation. The aircraft was repaired and returned to service.
