= Khartoum Refinery Company =

Oil refinery in Sudan

Khartoum Refinery Company Limited (KRC)
- Native name: شركة مصفاة الخرطوم المحدودة
- Type: Joint-stock
- Industry: Oil refinery
- Founded: 1997
- Headquarters: Khartoum North, Sudan
- Key people: Zhao Yujun (General Manager)
- Website: http://www.krcsd.com

The Khartoum Refinery Company, also colloquially known as Al-Jili Oil refinery, is a petroleum company in Sudan. The firm's name is abbreviated to KRC. The company was founded in 1997 and began operations in 2000. KRC is based in Khartoum North.

== Ownership ==
The company is 50% owned by the Sudanese government's Ministry of Energy & Mining (MEM) and 50% owned by the China National Petroleum Corporation (CNPC).

== Operations ==
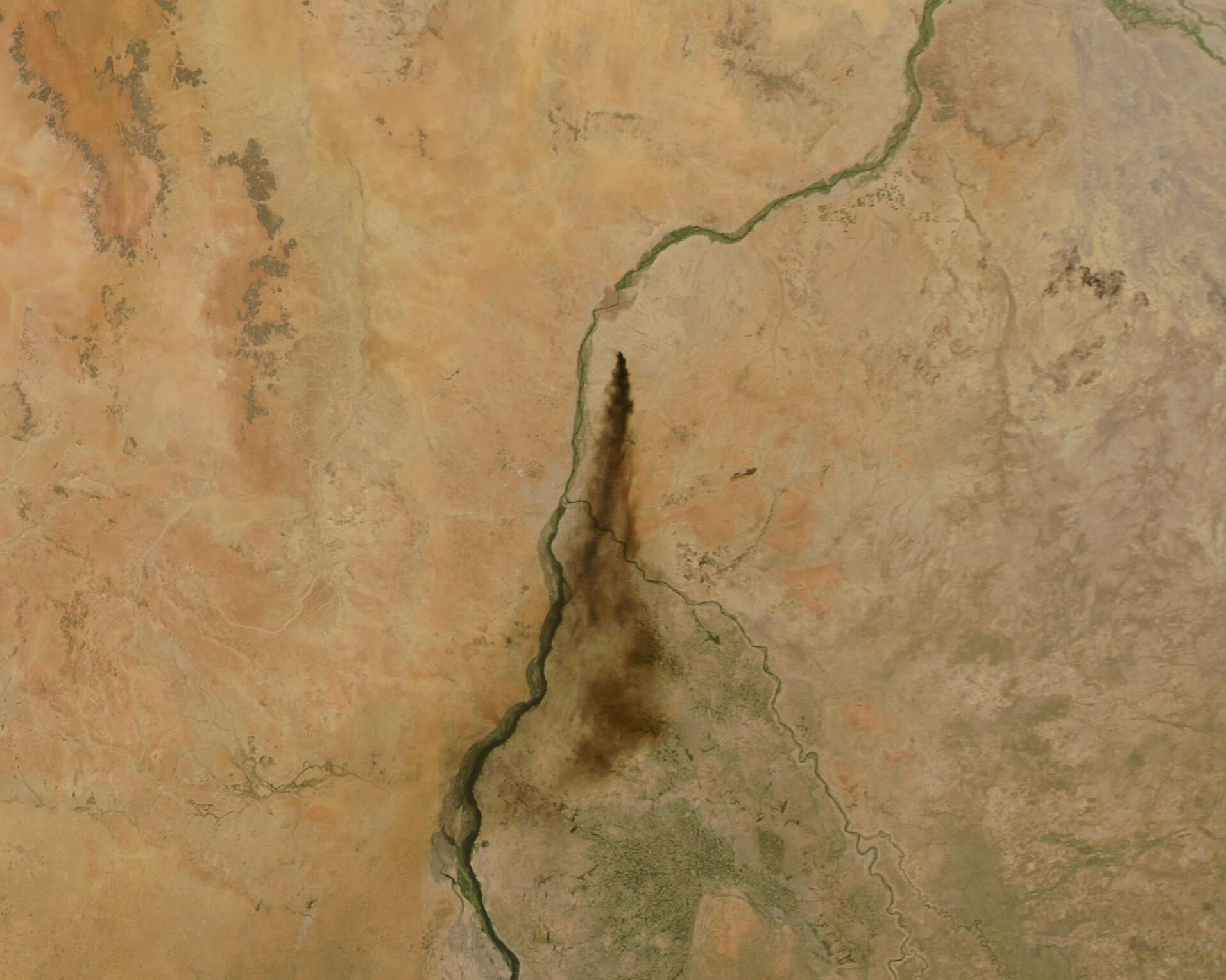
Satellite picture of Al Jaili refinery fire, 24 January 2025

The company operates the Al Jaili oil refinery 70 kilometers north of Khartoum. The capacity of the refinery is 100,000 barrels of oil per day.

Excess petroleum is exported from Bashair Port on the Red Sea through a pipeline of 1610 km length, making it the longest pipeline in Africa.

The facility has been non-operational since July 2023 due to the Sudanese civil war (2023–present), which has seen the facility attacked several times. A new operation by the Sudanese Armed Forces (SAF) to capture the facility in January 2025 caused a fire to engulf the facility. The SAF claimed that the Rapid Support Forces (RSF) set fire to the factory, while the Rapid Support Forces said the Sudanese Air Force caused the fire by dropping incendiary barrel bombs in the area.

On 24 January, the Sudanese army had retaken the oil refinery facility from RSF.
