= Standard Schedules Information Manual =

The Standard Schedules Information Manual (SSIM) published by the International Air Transport Association documents international airline standards call red and procedures for exchanging airline schedules and data on aircraft types, airports and terminals, and time zones.

SSIM is a file format that heavily compresses schedule information. Because it is accepted by most airlines and backed by IATA it simplifies the sharing of data between airlines, airports, reservation systems and many other aviation entities. The SSIM format includes structured data elements such as flight numbers, departure and arrival times, airport codes, aircraft types, and other information. These elements are defined in a specific order that forms a structural hierarchy.

== Sources ==
- Official page at IATA
