= Airline codes =

Index to lists of airline designators

This is a list of airline codes. The table lists IATA's two-character airline designators, (Note: IATA has the optional third character in any assigned code, see IATA airline designator.) ICAO's three-character airline designators and the airline call signs (telephony designator).

== IATA airline designator ==
IATA airline designators, sometimes called IATA reservation codes, are two-character codes assigned by the International Air Transport Association (IATA) to the world's airlines. The standard is described in IATA's Standard Schedules Information Manual and the codes themselves are described in IATA's Airline Coding Directory. (Both are published semiannually.)

The IATA codes were originally based on the ICAO designators which were issued in 1947 as two-letter airline identification codes (see the section below). IATA expanded the two-character-system with codes consisting of a letter and a digit (or vice versa) e.g. EasyJet's U2 after ICAO had introduced its current three-letter-system in 1982. Until then, only combinations of letters were used.

Airline designator codes follow the format xx(a), i.e., two alphanumeric characters (letters or digits) followed by an optional letter. Although the IATA standard provides for three-character airline designators, IATA has not used the optional third character in any assigned code. This is because some legacy computer systems, especially the "central reservations systems", have failed to comply with the standard, notwithstanding the fact that it has been in place for twenty years. The codes issued to date comply with IATA Resolution 762, which provides for only two characters. These codes thus comply with the current airline designator standard, but use only a limited subset of its possible range.

There are three types of designators: unique, numeric/alpha and controlled duplicate (explained below):

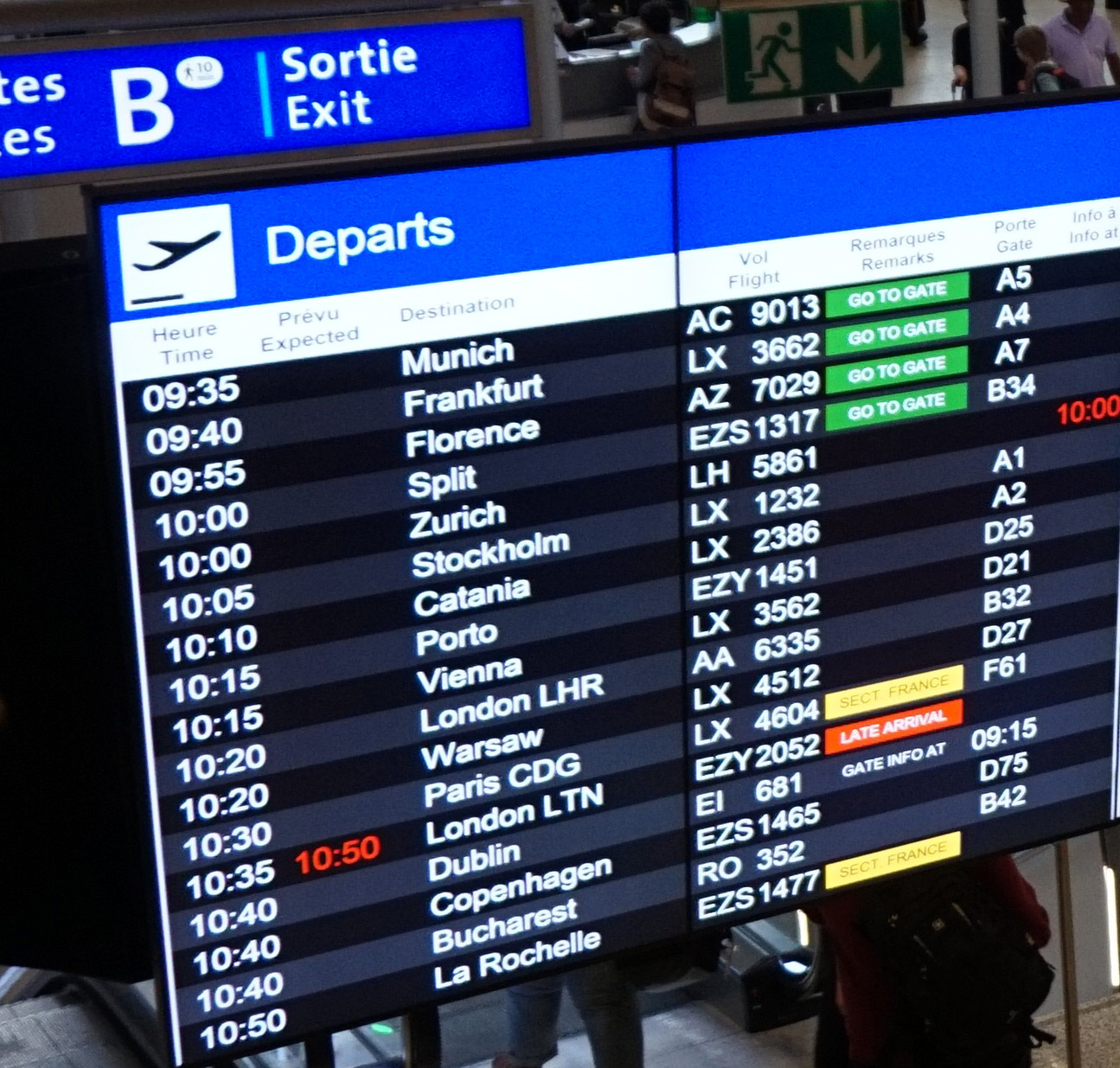
This board at Geneva Airport shows airline codes including AC (Air Canada), LX (Swiss) and AZ (ITA Airways).

IATA airline designators are used to identify an airline for commercial purposes in reservations, timetables, tickets, tariffs, air waybills and in telecommunications.

A flight designator is the concatenation of the airline designator, xx(a), and the numeric flight number, n(n)(n)(n), plus an optional one-letter "operational suffix" (a). Therefore, the full format of a flight designator is xx(a)n(n)(n)(n)(a).

After an airline is delisted, IATA can make the code available for reuse after six months and can issue "controlled duplicates". Controlled duplicates are issued to regional airlines whose destinations are not likely to overlap, so that the same code is shared by two airlines. The controlled duplicate is denoted here, and in IATA literature, with an asterisk (*). An example of this is the code "7Y", which refers to both Mid Airlines, a charter airline in Sudan, and Med Airways, a charter airline in Lebanon (ceased 2015, but did actually fly to Sudan)

IATA also issues an accounting or prefix code. This number is used on tickets as the first three characters of the ticket number.

IATA airline designators are usually kept even if the airline changes name, so the code does not match the name anymore. For example, AY was given to Aero OY, now Finnair, and FI was given to Flugfélag Íslands, now Icelandair.

== ICAO airline designator ==
The ICAO airline designator is a code assigned by the International Civil Aviation Organization (ICAO) to aircraft operating agencies, aeronautical authorities, and services related to international aviation, each of which is allocated both a three-letter designator and a telephony designator. These codes are unique by airline, unlike the IATA designator codes (see section above). The designators are listed in ICAO Document 8585: Designators for Aircraft Operating Agencies, Aeronautical Authorities and Services.

ICAO codes have been issued since 1947. The ICAO codes were originally based on a two-letter system and were identical to the airline codes used by IATA. After an airline joined IATA its existing ICAO two-letter code was taken over as IATA code. Because both organizations used the same code system, the current terms ICAO code and IATA code did not exist until the 1980s. They were commonly called two-letter airline designators. At that time, it was impossible to find out whether an airline was an IATA member or not just by looking at its code. In the 1970s the abbreviation BA was the ICAO code and the IATA code of British Airways, while non-IATA members like Court Line used their two-letter abbreviation as ICAO code only. In 1982 ICAO introduced the current three-letter system due to the increasing number of airlines. After a transitional period of five years, it became the official new ICAO standard system in November 1987 while IATA kept the older two-letter system that was introduced by ICAO in 1947.

Certain combinations of letters are not allocated, to avoid confusion with other systems. Other designators, particularly those starting with Y and Z, are reserved for government organizations. The designator YYY is used for operators that do not have a code allocated.

An example is:

- Operator: American Airlines
- Three-letter designator: AAL (the original ICAO-two-letter designator AA was officially used until 1987 and is also the IATA code of the airline)
- Telephony designator: AMERICAN

A timeline of the airline designators used by American Airlines:

	IATA	ICAO	Remarks
Before 1947	-	-	Airline designators did not exist
1947 to early 1950s	-	AA	ICAO issued 2-letter-designators in 1947
early 1950s to 1982	AA	AA	ICAO designators were taken over by IATA in the early 1950s
1982 to 1987	AA	AA (AAL)	ICAO issued 3-letter-codes but kept the 2-letter-designators as official system
from 1988	AA	AAL	3-letter-designators became the official ICAO system in November 1987

== Call signs (flight identification or flight ID) ==
Most airlines employ a call sign that is normally spoken during airband radio transmissions. As specified by ICAO Annex 10 chapter 5.2.1.7.2.1 a call sign shall be one of the following types:

- Type A: the characters corresponding to the registration mark of the aircraft.
- Type B: the telephony designator of the aircraft operating agency, followed by the last four characters of the registration mark of the aircraft.
- Type C: the telephony designator of the aircraft operating agency, followed by the flight identification.

The one most widely used within commercial aviation is type C. The flight identification is very often the same as the flight number, though this is not always the case. In case of call sign confusion, a different flight identification can be chosen, but the flight number will remain the same. Call sign confusion happens when two or more flights with similar flight numbers fly close to each other, e.g., KLM 645 and KLM 649 or BA's Speedbird 446 and Speedbird 664.

The flight number is published in an airline's public timetable and appears on the arrivals and departure screens in the airport terminals. In cases of emergency, the airline name and flight number, rather than the call sign, are normally mentioned by the main news media.

Some call signs are less obviously associated with a particular airline than others. This might be for historic reasons (South African Airways uses the call sign 'Springbok', hearkening back to the airline's original livery which featured a springbok), or possibly to avoid confusion with a call sign used by an established airline.

Companies' assigned names may change as a result of mergers, acquisitions, or change in company name or status; British Airways (BA) uses the former BOAC call sign 'Speedbird', as British Airways was formed by a merger of BOAC and British European Airways (BEA). Country names can also change over time, and new call signs may be agreed in substitution for traditional ones. The country shown alongside an airline's call sign is that wherein most of its aircraft are believed to be registered, which may not always be the same as the country in which the firm is officially incorporated or registered. There are many other airlines in business whose radio call signs are more obviously derived from the trading name.

The call sign should ideally resemble the operator's name or function, and not be confused with call signs used by other operators. The call sign should be easily and phonetically pronounceable, in at least English, the international language of aviation. For example, Air France' call sign is 'Airfrans'; 'frans' is the phonetic spelling of 'France'. Another example is Kalitta Charters II, whose call sign 'Dragster' is for owner Doug Kalitta, an NHRA Mission Foods Drag Racing Series Top Fuel champion.

In the previous years, alpha-numeric call signs have been adopted by airlines (mostly in Europe) to minimise call sign confusion over the radio. This kind of call sign may include a combination of: a digit and a letter, digit and two letters, or two-digits and one letter. e.g. Airfrans six-five kilo (AFR65K).

== Accounting number or prefix code ==
The airline accounting code, or prefix code, is a 3-digit number, referenced by IATA and unique among all the airlines, used to identify the airline in various accounting activities such as ticketing. For instance, United Airlines (UA/UAL) has been assigned 016 as accounting code, and all the flight tickets issued by that airline start with "016-". The IATA code search page references the accounting code for every airline having one.

== See also ==
- International Air Transport Association airport code
- International Civil Aviation Organization airport code
