= List of Saudia destinations =

Destinations Saudia serves

Saudi Arabian airline Saudia flies to over 140 cities in Asia, Europe, Africa and North America from its hubs of Jeddah, Riyadh and Medina.

== Destinations ==
| Country | City | Airport | Notes | Refs |
|---|---|---|---|---|
| Algeria | Algiers | Houari Boumediene Airport | Passenger | |
| Algeria | Annaba | Rabah Bitat Airport | Seasonal | |
| Algeria | Constantine | Mohamed Boudiaf International Airport | Seasonal | |
| Algeria | Ghardaia | Noumérat – Moufdi Zakaria Airport | Seasonal | |
| Algeria | Oran | Ahmed Ben Bella Airport | Seasonal | |
| Austria | Vienna | Vienna International Airport | Passenger | |
| Australia | Geelong | Avalon Airport | Cargo | |
| Bahrain | Manama | Bahrain International Airport | Passenger | |
| Bangladesh | Chittagong | Shah Amanat International Airport | Passenger | |
| Bangladesh | Dhaka | Hazrat Shahjalal International Airport | Passenger + cargo | |
| Belgium | Brussels | Brussels Airport | Cargo | |
| Belgium | Liège | Liège Airport | Cargo | |
| Belgium | Ostend | Ostend–Bruges International Airport | Terminated | |
| Canada | Montreal | Montréal–Trudeau International Airport | Terminated | |
| Canada | Toronto | Toronto Pearson International Airport | Passenger | |
| Chad | N'Djamena | N'Djamena International Airport | Cargo | |
| China | Beijing | Beijing Daxing International Airport | Passenger | |
| China | Guangzhou | Guangzhou Baiyun International Airport | Passenger | |
| China | Hong Kong | Hong Kong International Airport | Cargo | |
| China | Shanghai | Shanghai Pudong International Airport | Cargo | |
| China | Shenzhen | Shenzhen Baoan International Airport | Cargo | |
| Cyprus | Larnaca | Larnaca International Airport | Seasonal | |
| Djibouti | Djibouti City | Djibouti–Ambouli International Airport | Temporarily suspended | |
| Egypt | Alexandria | Borg El Arab International Airport | Passenger | |
| Egypt | Cairo | Cairo International Airport | Passenger | |
| Egypt | El Alamein | El Alamein International Airport | Seasonal | |
| Egypt | Hurghada | Hurghada International Airport | Seasonal | |
| Egypt | Sharm El Sheikh | Sharm El Sheikh International Airport | Passenger | |
| Ethiopia | Addis Ababa | Addis Ababa Bole International Airport | Passenger + cargo | |
| Eritrea | Asmara | Asmara International Airport | Terminated | |
| Georgia | Batumi | Batumi International Airport | Passenger | |
| France | Nice | Nice Côte d'Azur Airport | Seasonal | |
| France | Paris | Charles de Gaulle Airport | Passenger | |
| Germany | Frankfurt | Frankfurt Airport | Passenger + cargo | |
| Germany | Munich | Munich Airport | Passenger | |
| Ghana | Accra | Accra International Airport | Terminated | |
| Greece | Athens | Athens International Airport | Passenger | |
| Greece | Athens | Ellinikon International Airport | Airport closed | |
| Greece | Heraklion | Heraklion International Airport | Seasonal | |
| Greece | Mykonos | Mykonos Airport | Seasonal | |
| India | Ahmedabad | Ahmedabad Airport | Seasonal | |
| India | Bangalore | Kempegowda International Airport | Passenger | |
| India | Chennai | Chennai International Airport | Passenger | |
| India | Delhi | Indira Gandhi International Airport | Passenger | |
| India | Hyderabad | Rajiv Gandhi International Airport | Passenger | |
| India | Kochi | Cochin International Airport | Passenger | |
| India | Kolkata | Netaji Subhas Chandra Bose International Airport | Seasonal | |
| India | Kozhikode | Calicut International Airport | Passenger | |
| India | Lucknow | Chaudhary Charan Singh International Airport | Passenger | |
| India | Mumbai | Chhatrapati Shivaji Maharaj International Airport | Passenger + cargo | |
| India | Thiruvananthapuram | Thiruvananthapuram International Airport | Terminated | |
| Indonesia | Bandung | Kertajati International Airport | Seasonal | |
| Indonesia | Batam | Hang Nadim International Airport | Passenger | |
| Indonesia | Denpasar | Ngurah Rai International Airport | Passenger | |
| Indonesia | Jakarta | Soekarno–Hatta International Airport | Passenger | |
| Indonesia | Makassar | Sultan Hasanuddin International Airport | Passenger | |
| Indonesia | Medan | Kualanamu International Airport | Passenger | |
| Indonesia | Padang | Minangkabau International Airport | Seasonal | |
| Indonesia | Palembang | Sultan Mahmud Badaruddin II International Airport | Seasonal | |
| Indonesia | Surabaya | Juanda International Airport | Passenger | |
| Iran | Ahvaz | Ahvaz International Airport | Seasonal | |
| Iran | Isfahan | Isfahan International Airport | Seasonal | |
| Iran | Mashhad | Mashhad International Airport | Seasonal | |
| Iran | Sari | Dasht-e Naz Airport | Terminated | |
| Iran | Tabriz | Tabriz International Airport | Seasonal | |
| Iran | Tehran | Imam Khomeini International Airport | Seasonal | |
| Iran | Tehran | Tehran Mehrabad International Airport | Terminated | |
| Iran | Zahedan | Zahedan Airport | Seasonal | |
| Iraq | Baghdad | Baghdad International Airport | Passenger | |
| Iraq | Basra | Basra International Airport | Terminated | |
| Iraq | Erbil | Erbil International Airport | Passenger | |
| Italy | Milan | Milan Malpensa Airport | Passenger + cargo | |
| Italy | Rome | Rome Fiumicino Airport | Passenger | |
| Italy | Venice | Venice Marco Polo Airport | Seasonal | |
| Japan | Osaka | Kansai International Airport | Terminated | |
| Japan | Tokyo | Narita International Airport | Resumes 11 November 2026 | |
| Jordan | Amman | Queen Alia International Airport | Passenger | |
| Kenya | Nairobi | Jomo Kenyatta International Airport | Passenger + cargo | |
| Kuwait | Kuwait City | Kuwait International Airport | Passenger | |
| Lebanon | Beirut | Beirut–Rafic Hariri International Airport | Passenger | |
| Libya | Tripoli | Tripoli International Airport | Terminated | |
| Libya | Benghazi | Benina International Airport | Terminated | |
| Libya | Sabha | Sabha Airport | Terminated | |
| Maldives | Malé | Velana International Airport | Passenger | |
| Malaysia | Kuala Lumpur | Kuala Lumpur International Airport | Passenger | |
| Mauritius | Port-Louis | Sir Seewoosagur Ramgoolam International Airport | Passenger | |
| Morocco | Agadir | Agadir–Al Massira Airport | Seasonal | |
| Morocco | Casablanca | Mohammed V International Airport | Passenger | |
| Morocco | Fez | Fès–Saïs Airport | Seasonal | |
| Morocco | Marrakesh | Marrakesh Menara Airport | Seasonal | |
| Morocco | Oujda | Angads Airport | Terminated | |
| Morocco | Rabat | Rabat–Salé Airport | Seasonal | |
| Morocco | Tangier | Tangier Ibn Battouta Airport | Seasonal | |
| Netherlands | Amsterdam | Amsterdam Airport Schiphol | Passenger + cargo | |
| Netherlands | Maastricht | Maastricht Aachen Airport | Cargo | |
| Nigeria | Abuja | Nnamdi Azikiwe International Airport | Passenger | |
| Nigeria | Kano | Mallam Aminu Kano International Airport | Passenger | |
| Nigeria | Lagos | Murtala Muhammed International Airport | Cargo | |
| Oman | Muscat | Muscat International Airport | Passenger | |
| Oman | Salalah | Salalah International Airport | Seasonal | |
| Pakistan | Islamabad | Benazir Bhutto International Airport | Airport closed | |
| Pakistan | Islamabad | Islamabad International Airport | Passenger | |
| Pakistan | Karachi | Jinnah International Airport | Passenger | |
| Pakistan | Lahore | Allama Iqbal International Airport | Passenger | |
| Pakistan | Multan | Multan International Airport | Passenger | |
| Pakistan | Peshawar | Bacha Khan International Airport | Passenger | |
| Philippines | Manila | Ninoy Aquino International Airport | Passenger | |
| Qatar | Doha | Doha International Airport | Airport closed | |
| Qatar | Doha | Hamad International Airport | Passenger | |
| Russia | Moscow | Sheremetyevo International Airport | Passenger | |
| Saudi Arabia | Abha | Abha International Airport | Passenger | |
| Saudi Arabia | Al Ahsa | Al-Ahsa International Airport | Passenger | |
| Saudi Arabia | Al Bahah | Al-Baha Domestic Airport | Passenger | |
| Saudi Arabia | AlUla | Prince Abdul Majeed bin Abdulaziz International Airport | Passenger | |
| Saudi Arabia | Al-Jawf | Al Jouf Airport | Passenger | |
| Saudi Arabia | Arar | Arar Domestic Airport | Passenger | |
| Saudi Arabia | Bisha | Bisha Domestic Airport | Passenger | |
| Saudi Arabia | Buraidah | Prince Naif bin Abdulaziz International Airport | Passenger | |
| Saudi Arabia | Dammam | King Fahd International Airport | Hub | |
| Saudi Arabia | Dawadmi | Dawadmi Domestic Airport | Passenger | |
| Saudi Arabia | Dhahran | Dhahran International Airport | Airport closed | |
| Saudi Arabia | Gurayat | Gurayat Domestic Airport | Passenger | |
| Saudi Arabia | Ha'il | Ha'il Regional Airport | Passenger | |
| Saudi Arabia | Jeddah | King Abdulaziz International Airport | Hub | |
| Saudi Arabia | Jeddah | Jeddah International Airport | Airport closed | |
| Saudi Arabia | Jizan | Jizan Regional Airport | Passenger | |
| Saudi Arabia | King Khalid Military City | King Khaled Military City Airport | Passenger | |
| Saudi Arabia | Medina | Prince Mohammad bin Abdulaziz International Airport | Hub | |
| Saudi Arabia | Najran | Najran Domestic Airport | Passenger | |
| Saudi Arabia | Neom | Neom Airport | Passenger | |
| Saudi Arabia | Qaisumah | Al Qaisumah/Hafr Al Batin Airport | Passenger | |
| Saudi Arabia | Rafha | Rafha Domestic Airport | Passenger | |
| Saudi Arabia | Red Sea Project | Red Sea International Airport | Passenger | |
| Saudi Arabia | Riyadh | King Khalid International Airport | Hub | |
| Saudi Arabia | Riyadh | Riyadh International Airport | Airport closed | |
| Saudi Arabia | Sharurah | Sharurah Domestic Airport | Passenger | |
| Saudi Arabia | Tabuk | Tabuk Regional Airport | Passenger | |
| Saudi Arabia | Ta'if | Taif International Airport | Passenger | |
| Saudi Arabia | Turaif | Turaif Domestic Airport | Passenger | |
| Saudi Arabia | Wadi Ad Dawasir | Wadi al-Dawasir Domestic Airport | Passenger | |
| Saudi Arabia | Wedjh | Al Wajh Domestic Airport | Passenger | |
| Saudi Arabia | Yanbu | Yanbu Airport | Passenger | |
| Singapore | Singapore | Changi Airport | Passenger | |
| Somalia | Mogadishu | Aden Adde International Airport | Terminated | |
| South Africa | Johannesburg | O. R. Tambo International Airport | Passenger | |
| South Korea | Seoul | Gimpo International Airport | Terminated | |
| South Korea | Seoul | Incheon International Airport | Terminated | |
| Spain | Barcelona | Josep Tarradellas Barcelona–El Prat Airport | Passenger | |
| Spain | Madrid | Madrid–Barajas Airport | Passenger | |
| Spain | Málaga | Málaga Airport | Seasonal | |
| Spain | Zaragoza | Zaragoza Airport | Cargo | |
| Sri Lanka | Colombo | Bandaranaike International Airport | Terminated | |
| Sudan | Khartoum | Khartoum International Airport | Terminated | |
| Sudan | Port Sudan | Port Sudan New International Airport | Passenger | |
| Sweden | Stockholm | Stockholm Arlanda Airport | Terminated | |
| Switzerland | Geneva | Geneva Airport | Passenger | |
| Switzerland | Zürich | Zurich Airport | Passenger | |
| Syria | Aleppo | Aleppo International Airport | Terminated | |
| Syria | Damascus | Damascus International Airport | Passenger | |
| Taiwan | Taipei | Taoyuan International Airport | Terminated | |
| Tanzania | Dar es Salaam | Julius Nyerere International Airport | Terminated | |
| Thailand | Bangkok | Don Mueang International Airport | Terminated | |
| Thailand | Bangkok | Suvarnabhumi Airport | Passenger | |
| Thailand | Phuket | Phuket International Airport | Passenger | |
| Tunisia | Tunis | Tunis–Carthage International Airport | Passenger | |
| Turkey | Adana | Adana Airport | Seasonal | |
| Turkey | Ankara | Ankara Esenboğa Airport | Passenger | |
| Turkey | Antalya | Antalya Airport | Seasonal | |
| Turkey | Istanbul | Atatürk Airport | Airport closed | |
| Turkey | Istanbul | Istanbul Airport | Passenger | |
| Turkey | İzmir | İzmir Adnan Menderes Airport | Seasonal | |
| United Arab Emirates | Abu Dhabi | Zayed International Airport | Passenger | |
| United Arab Emirates | Dubai | Al Maktoum International Airport | Cargo | |
| United Arab Emirates | Dubai | Dubai International Airport | Passenger | |
| United Arab Emirates | Sharjah | Sharjah International Airport | Cargo | |
| United Kingdom | Birmingham | Birmingham Airport | Terminated | |
| United Kingdom | London | Gatwick Airport | Terminated | |
| United Kingdom | London | Heathrow Airport | Passenger | |
| United Kingdom | Manchester | Manchester Airport | Passenger | |
| United Kingdom | Manston | Manston Airport | Airport closed | |
| United States | Houston | George Bush Intercontinental Airport | Cargo | |
| United States | Los Angeles | Los Angeles International Airport | Passenger | |
| United States | New York City | John F. Kennedy International Airport | Passenger + cargo | |
| United States | Orlando | Orlando International Airport | Terminated | |
| United States | Washington, D.C. | Dulles International Airport | Passenger | |
| Vietnam | Hanoi | Noi Bai International Airport | Terminated | |
| Vietnam | Ho Chi Minh City | Tan Son Nhat International Airport | Cargo | |
| Yemen | Aden | Aden International Airport | Terminated | |
| Yemen | Sanaa | Sanaa International Airport | Terminated | |

== See also ==
- Saudia Cargo#Destinations for cargo destinations
