= Saudia =

National airline of Saudi Arabia

Saudia السعودية

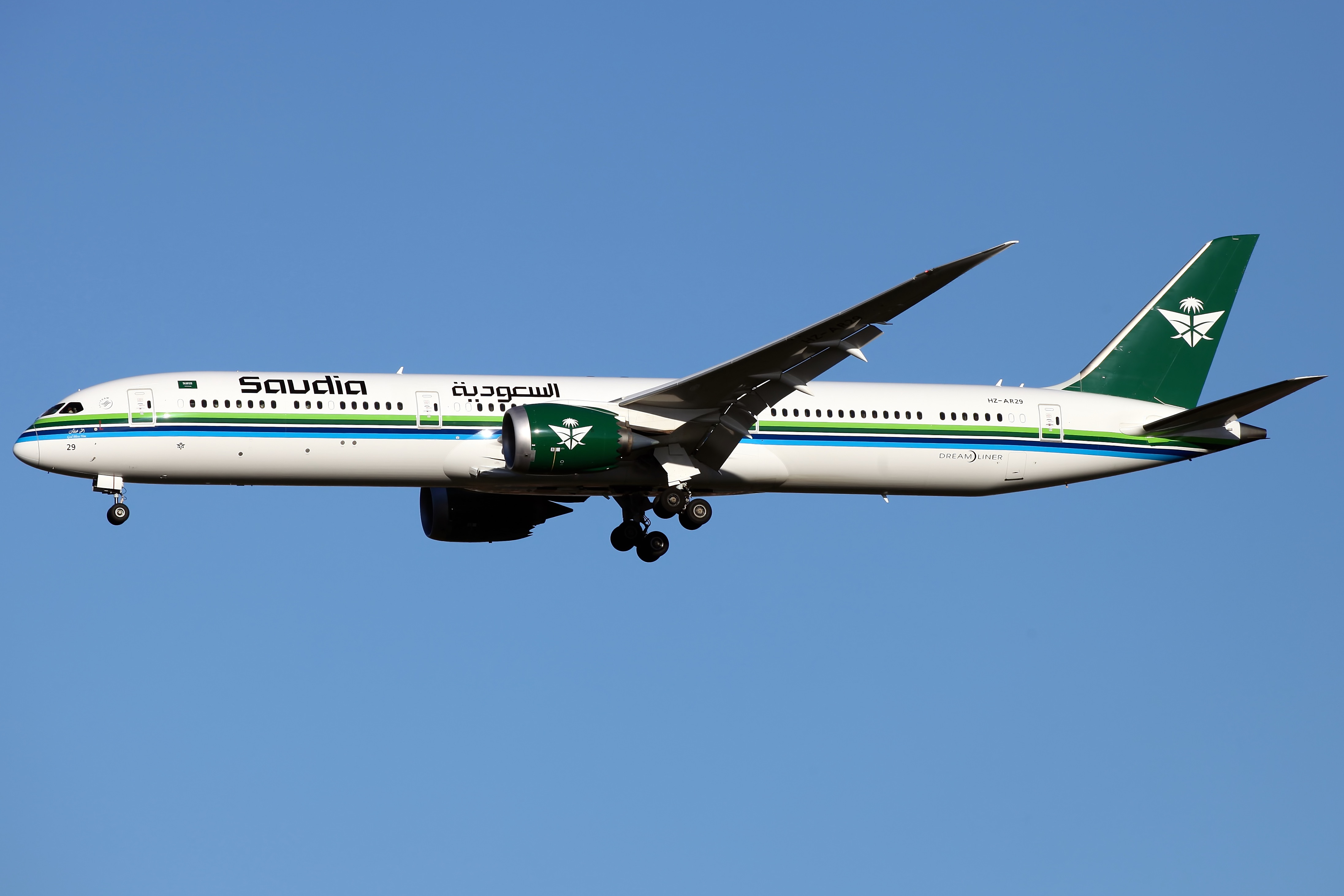
- Saudia Boeing 787-10 in 2025
IATA	ICAO	Call sign
SV	SVA	SAUDIA
- Founded: 27 September 1945; 81 years ago
- Hubs: King Abdulaziz International Airport
- Secondary hubs: Medina Airport; King Fahd International Airport; King Khalid International Airport
- Focus cities: Jeddah; Riyadh; Dammam; Medina
- Frequent-flyer program: Al-Fursan Loyalty
- Alliance: SkyTeam
- Subsidiaries: Flyadeal; Saudia Cargo
- Fleet size: 157 (2025)
- Destinations: 148
- Parent company: Saudia Group; (Government of Saudi Arabia)
- Headquarters: Jeddah, Saudi Arabia
- Key people: Engr. Saleh bin Nasser (Chairman); Engr. Ibrahim bin Abdulrahaman Al-Omar (Director General)
- Website: saudia.com

Saudia (Note: Arabic: السعودية (romanized: as-Suʿūdiyyah); formerly known as Saudi Arabian Airlines (الخطوط الجوية العربية السعودية, al-Ḫuṭūṭ al-Jawwiyyah al-ʿArabiyyah as-Suʿūdiyyah)) is the first flag carrier of Saudi Arabia, headquartered in Jeddah. Its main hub is King Abdulaziz International Airport in Jeddah, with secondary hubs at Prince Mohammad bin Abdulaziz International Airport in Medina and King Fahd International Airport in Dammam, and a hub at King Khalid International Airport in Riyadh, which it plans to vacate by 2030 for the launch of Riyadh Air.

Saudia primarily serves the Middle East and North Africa market and operates scheduled domestic and international flights to over 100 destinations across Africa, Asia, Europe, and North America. Charter flights are typically operated during the Ramadan and Hajj seasons. The airline has been a member of the SkyTeam airline alliance since 29 May 2012, becoming the first carrier from the Middle East to join the alliance. Saudia is also a founding member of the Arab Air Carriers' Organization, having joined in 1965.

== History ==
=== Early years ===
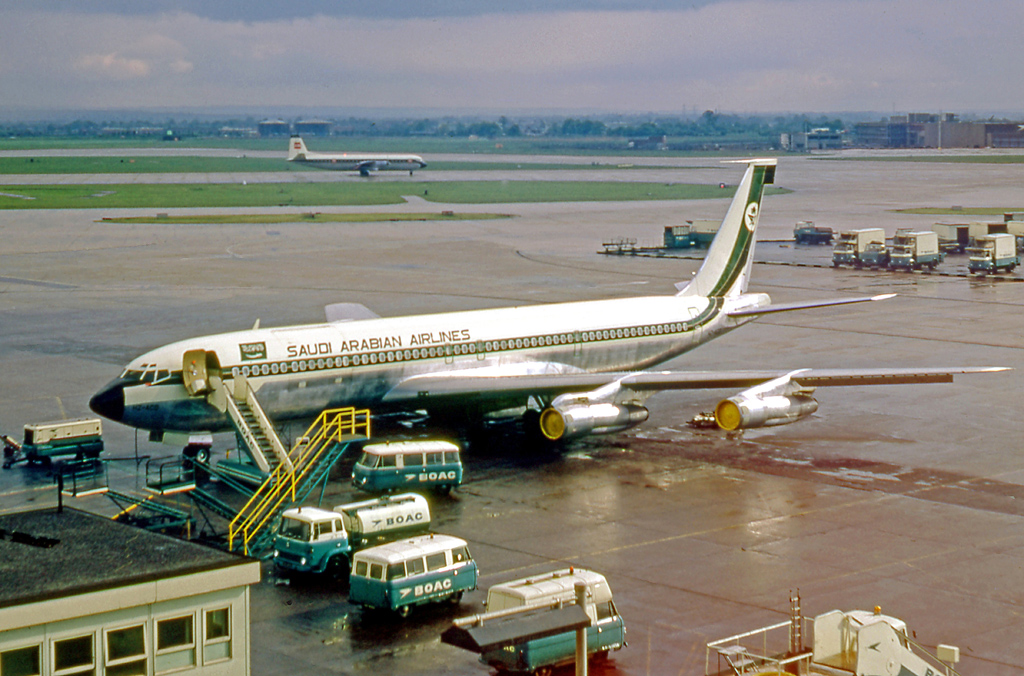
Saudi Arabian Airlines Boeing 707 in 1969

When U.S. President Franklin D. Roosevelt presented a Douglas DC-3 as a gift to King Abdulaziz in 1945, the event marked the kingdom's gradual development of civil aviation. The nation's flag carrier, Saudia, was founded as Saudi Arabian Airlines in September 1945 as a fully owned government agency under the control of the Ministry of Defense, with Trans World Airlines (TWA) running the airline under a management contract.

The now-demolished Jeddah Airport, close to Jeddah, was the flag carrier's main base. Among the airline's early operations was a special flight from Lydda (Lod) in Palestine (today in Israel, site of Ben Gurion Airport), a British Mandate at that time, to carry Hajj pilgrims to Jeddah. The airline used five DC-3 aircraft to launch scheduled operations on the Jeddah-Riyadh-Hofuf-Dhahran route in March 1947. Its first international service was between Jeddah and Cairo. Service to Beirut, Karachi and Damascus followed in early 1948. The first of five Bristol 170s was received the following year. These aircraft offered the airline the flexibility of carrying both passengers and cargo. In 1959, Saudia opened its first aviation school, the Pilot Training Institute based in Jeddah Airport. It had 14 founding students out of the 20 nominees, with Baha Aldeen Asad appointed as the principal and Captain Norman B. Doerr as American supervisor.

In 1962, the airline took delivery of two Boeing 720s, becoming the fourth Middle Eastern airline to fly jet aircraft after Middle East Airlines and Cyprus Airways with the de Havilland Comet in 1960 and El Al with the Boeing 707 in 1961. On 19 February 1963, the airline became a registered company, with King Faisal of Saudi Arabia signing the papers that declared Saudia a fully independent company. DC-6s and Boeing 707s were later bought, and the airline joined the AACO, the Arab Air Carriers' Organization. Services were started to Frankfurt, Geneva, Khartoum, London, Mumbai, Rabat, Sharjah, Tehran, Tripoli, and Tunis.

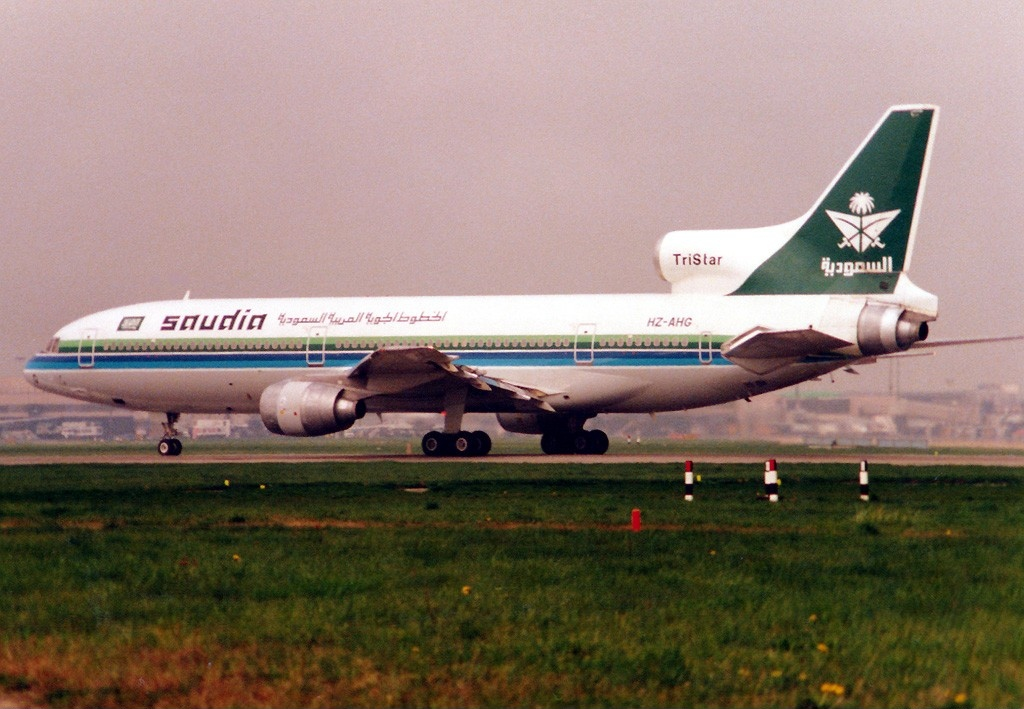
Saudi Arabian Airlines Lockheed L-1011 TriStar in 1987

In the 1970s, a new livery was introduced. It comprised a white fuselage with green and blue stripes and a green tailfin. The carrier's name was changed to Saudia on 1 April 1972. Boeing 737s and Fokker F-28s were bought, with the 737s replacing the Douglas DC-9. The airline operated its first Boeing 747 service in 1977 when three jumbo jets were leased from Middle East Airlines and deployed in the London sector. The first all-cargo flights between Saudi Arabia and Europe were started, and Lockheed L-1011s and Fairchild FH-27s were introduced. New services, including the Arabian Express 'no reservation shuttle flights' between Jeddah and Riyadh. The Special Flight Services (SFS) was set up as a special unit of Saudia and operates special flights for the royal family and government agencies. Service was also started to Kano, Muscat, Paris, Rome, and Stockholm. The Pan Am/Saudia joint service between Dhahran and New York City began in 1979.

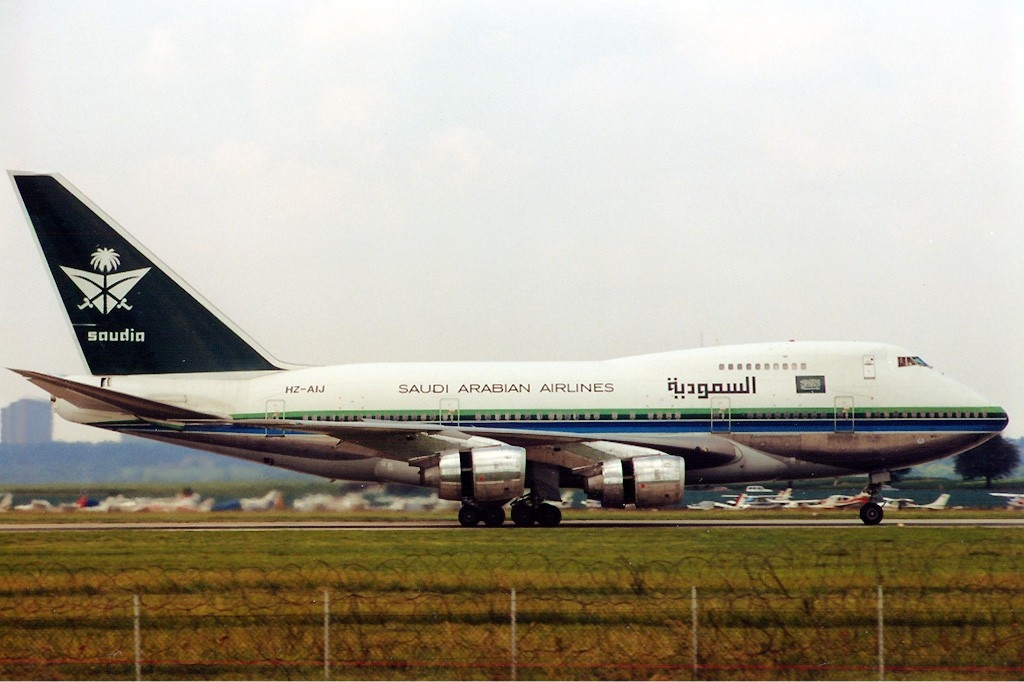
Saudi Arabian Airlines Boeing 747SP in 1989

In the 1980s, services such as Saudia Catering began. Flights were started to Amsterdam, Athens, Baghdad, Bangkok, Brussels, Colombo, Dakar, Delhi, Dhaka, Islamabad, Jakarta, Kuala Lumpur, Lahore, Madrid, Manila, Mogadishu, Nairobi, New York City, Nice, Seoul, Singapore, and Taipei. Horizon Class, a business class service, was established to offer enhanced service. Cargo hubs were built in Brussels and Taipei. Airbus A300s, Boeing 747s, and Cessna Citations were also added to the fleet, the Citations for the SFS service. On 1 July 1982, the first nonstop service from Jeddah to New York City was initiated with Boeing 747SP aircraft. This was followed by a Riyadh-New York route. In 1989, services to Larnaca and Addis Ababa began.

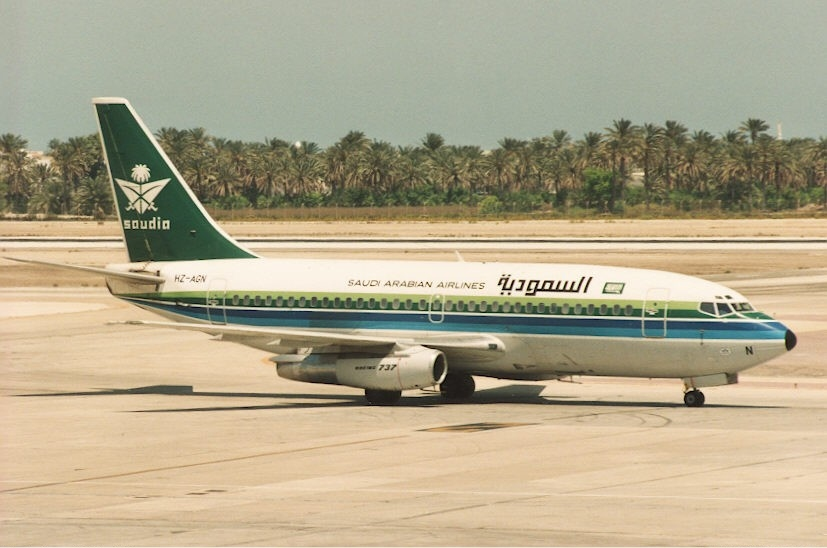
Saudi Arabian Airlines Boeing 737-200 in 1995

In the 1990s, services to Orlando, Chennai, Asmara, Washington, D.C., Johannesburg, Alexandria, Milan, Málaga (seasonal), and Sana'a (resumption) were introduced. Boeing 777s, MD-90s, and MD-11s were introduced. New female flight attendant uniforms designed by Adnan Akbar were introduced. A new corporate identity was launched on 16 July 1996, featuring a sand colored fuselage with contrasting dark blue tailfin, the center of which featured a stylized representation of the House of Saud crest. The Saudia name was dropped in the identity revamp, with the full Saudi Arabian Airlines name used.

=== Development (2000s–2020s) ===
On 8 October 2000, Prince Sultan bin Abdulaziz, the Saudi Minister of Defense and Aviation, signed a contract to conduct studies for the privatization of Saudi Arabian Airlines. In preparation for this, the airline was restructured to allow non-core units—including Saudia catering, ground handling services and maintenance as well as the Prince Sultan Aviation Academy in Jeddah—to be transformed into commercial units and profit centers. In April 2005, the Saudi government indicated that the airline may also lose its monopoly on domestic services.

In 2006, Saudia began the process of dividing itself into Strategic business units (SBU); the catering unit was the first to be privatized. In August 2007, Saudi Arabia's Council of Ministers approved the conversion of strategic units into companies. It is planned that ground services, technical services, air cargo and the Prince Sultan Aviation Academy, medical division, as well as the catering unit, will become subsidiaries of a holding company.

The airline rebranded to its former brand name Saudia (used from 1972 to 1996) on 29 May 2012, dropping the Saudi Arabian Airlines branding entirely; the name was changed to celebrate the company's entry into the SkyTeam airline alliance on that day, and it was part of a larger rebranding initiative.

Saudia received 64 new aircraft by the end of 2012 (six from Boeing and 58 from Airbus). Another eight Boeing 787-9 aircraft started to join the fleet in 2015.

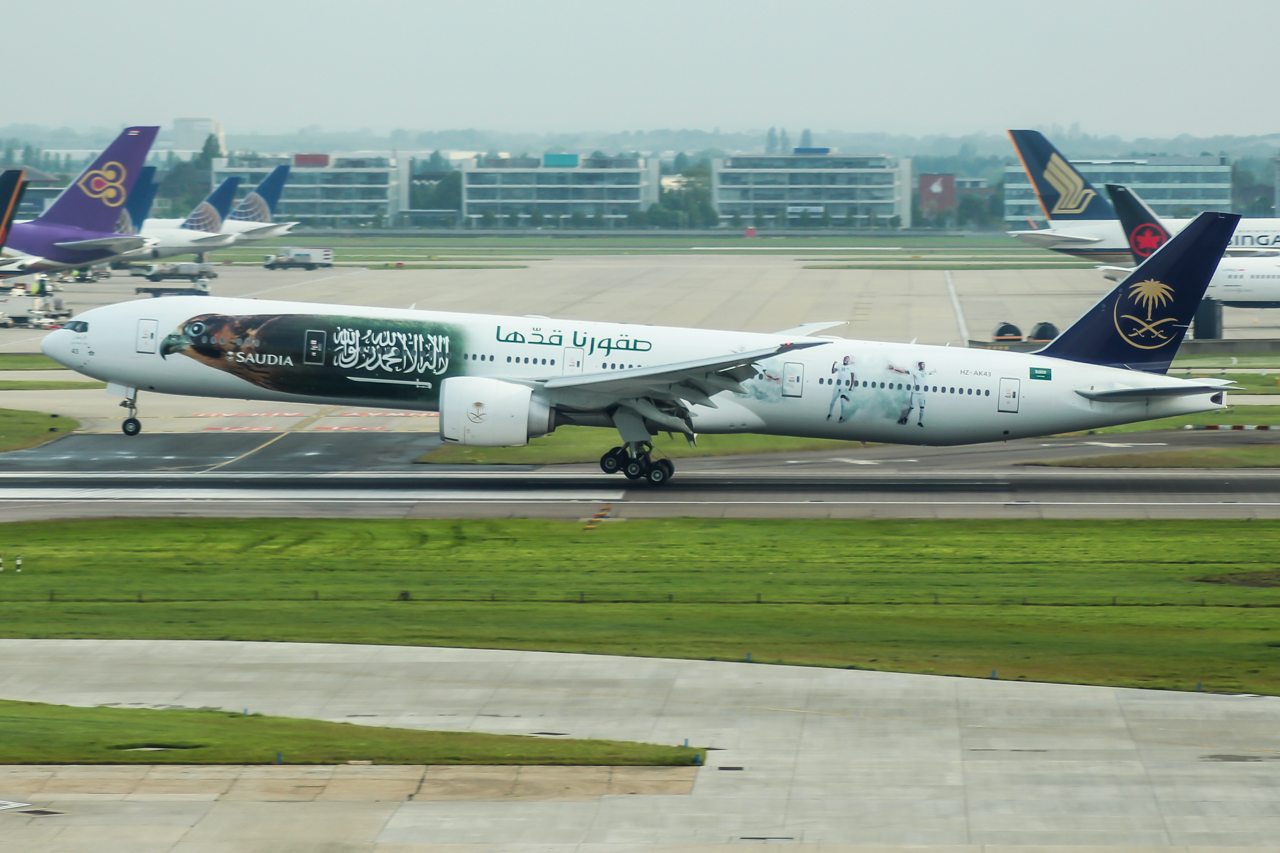
Saudia Boeing 777 decorated in a special livery to commemorate the Saudi Arabia national football team (nicknamed the 'Green Falcons') in 2018

In April 2016, Saudia announced the creation of a low-cost subsidiary named Flyadeal. The airline was launched as part of Saudia Group's SV 2020 Transformation Strategy, which intends to transform the group's units into world-class organisations by 2020. Flyadeal, which serves domestic and regional destinations, began operating in mid 2017.

=== Continued growth and new brand identity (2020s–present) ===
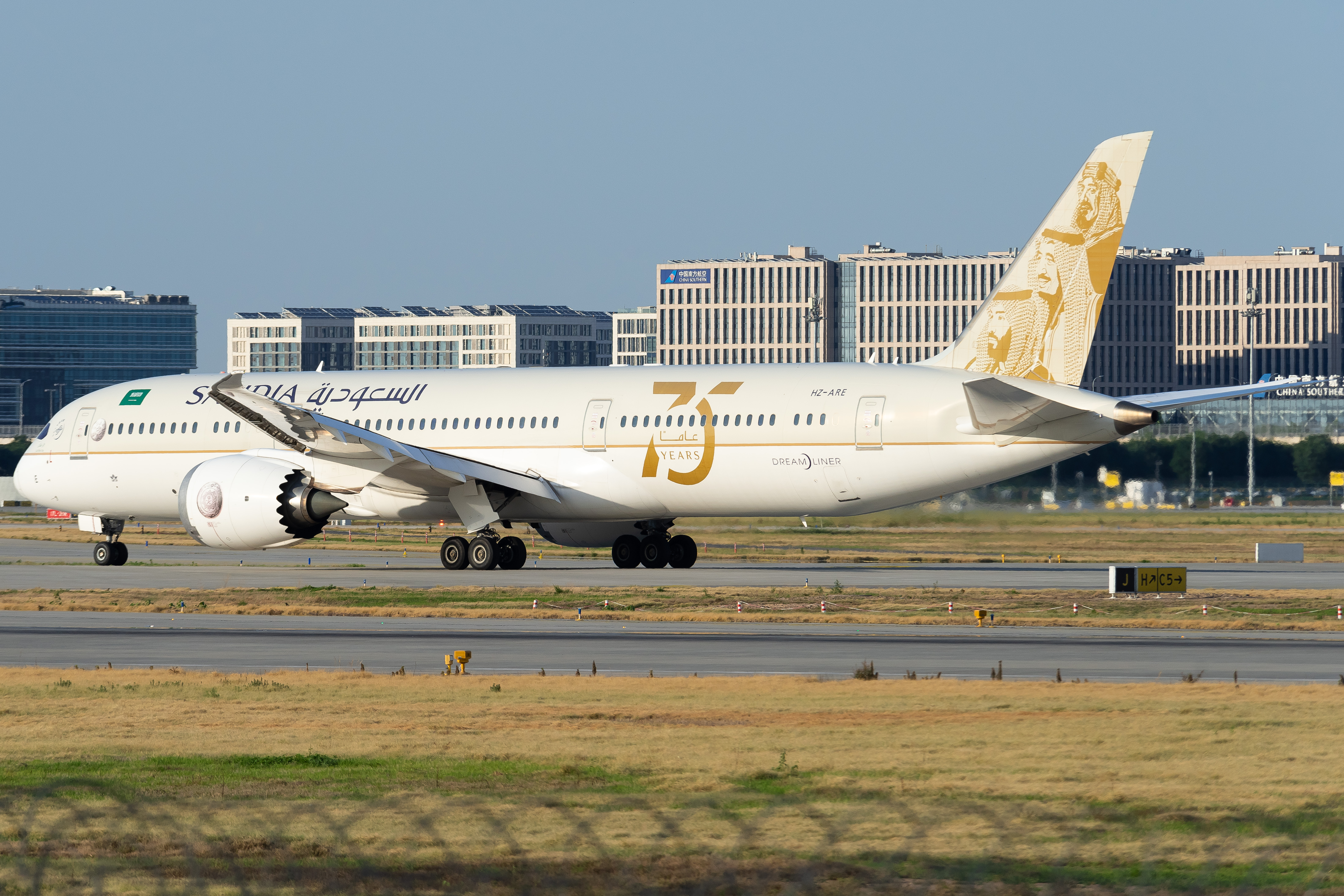
Saudia Boeing 787-9 with 75th Anniversary livery at Beijing Daxing International Airport

In April 2021, Saudia announced that on 19 April, it will try the mobile app developed by the International Air Transport Association (IATA) that helps passengers manage their travel information and documents digitally.

In December 2021, Saudia was in talks with the two major aircraft manufacturers Airbus and Boeing in purchasing new wide-body aircraft, the airline will decide in early 2022 whether it will order the Airbus A350 or the Boeing 777X, or it might purchase more Boeing 787s instead. The airline also chose the CFM International LEAP engine to power its Airbus A321neos which are expected to be delivered in 2024. The airline plans to have 250 planes in its fleet by 2030.

In April 2022, services began to Seoul, Beijing, Batumi, Mykonos, Barcelona, Málaga, Bangkok, Chicago, Moscow, Entebbe and Kyiv. Services to Kyiv are currently not operating due to the 2022 Russian invasion of Ukraine. In June 2022, they resumed services to Zurich. In July 2022, Saudia signed a contract with the Air Connectivity Programme to launch four new destinations to Zurich, Barcelona, Tunis and Kuala Lumpur.

In March 2023, Saudia ordered 39 Boeing 787s split between the -9 and -10 variants, with options for a further ten aircraft.

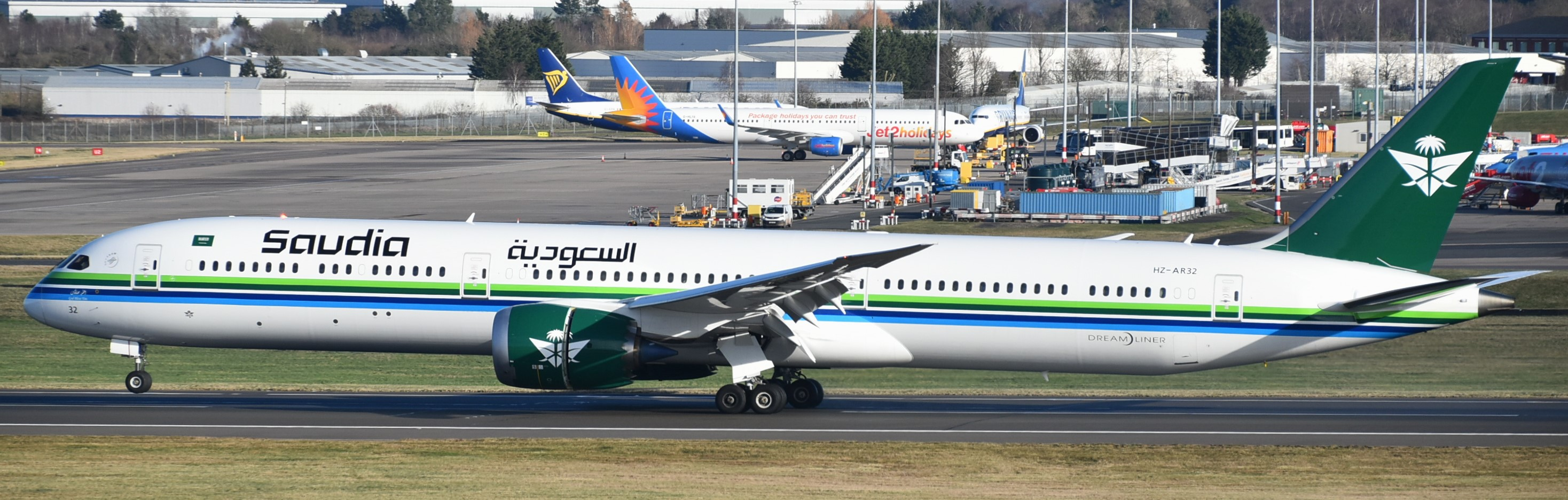
Saudia Boeing 787-10 in 2024 in the newest livery

In September 2023, Saudia announced a brand and livery rebrand back to the 1970s design and logo. It also introduced a new travel AI assistant called "SAUDIA", using OpenAI's GPT-4.

In January 2025, Saudia announced that the airline will be relocating its London to Neom route from Heathrow to Gatwick. The Heathrow route utilized larger Boeing 787-9 aircraft whereas Gatwick enables the airline to introduce smaller Airbus A320 aircraft, thus aligning capacity with demand and optimizing the airline's operational efficiency.

In early October 2026, due to renewed fighting between Saudi Arabia and Houthis, Riyadh airport was struck by ballistic missiles and shrapnel launched by the Houthis. Saudia had to cancel 100s of flights in the ensuing days. On October 8, shrapnel struck an A320-200 of Saudia, causing it to catch on fire. The aircraft was written off.

== Sponsorships ==
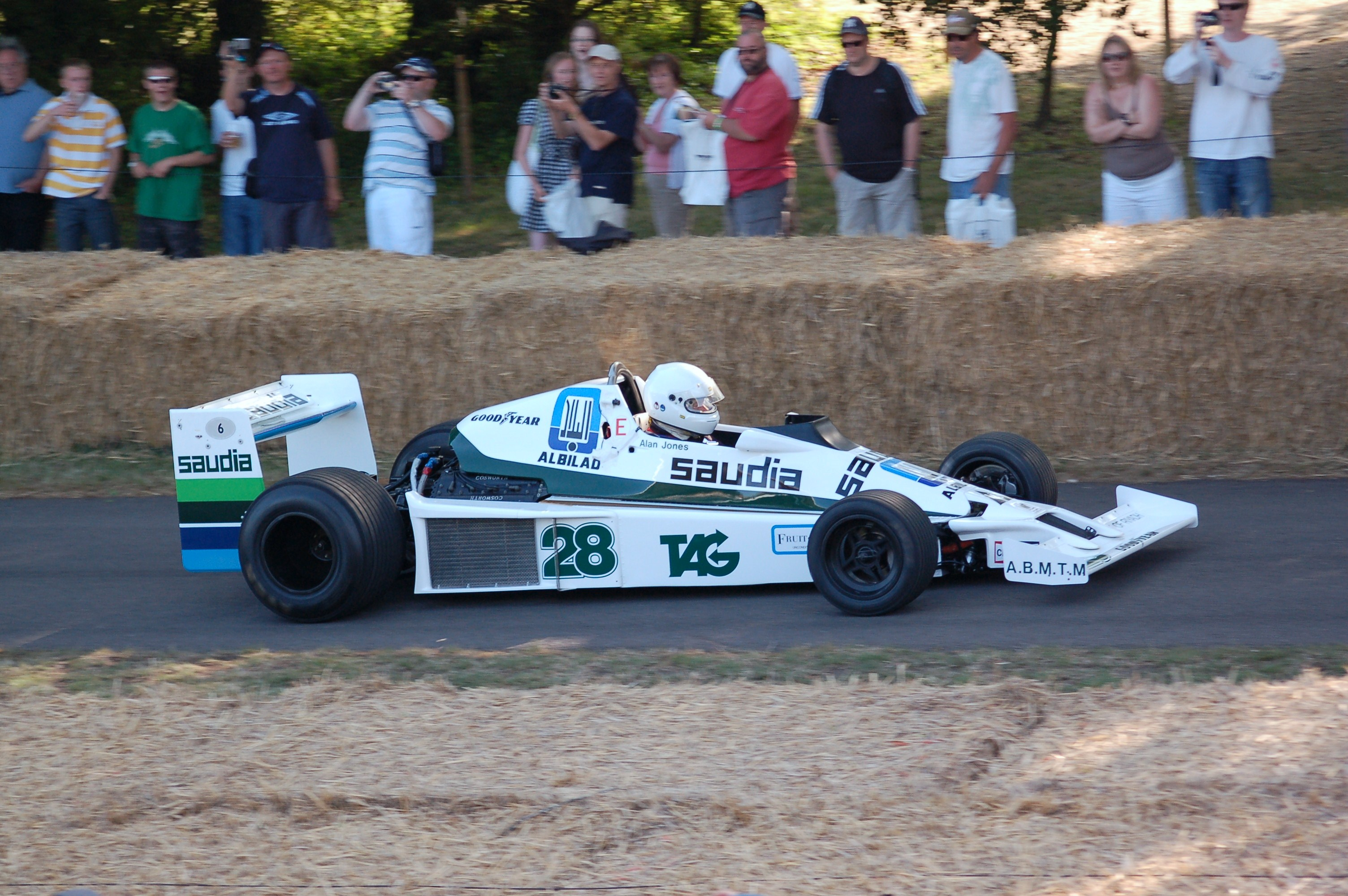
Saudia sponsorships on a 1978 Williams FW06 being demonstrated at the 2009 Goodwood Festival of Speed

Saudia was the main sponsor of the Williams Formula One team from 1977 to 1984. During this period Williams won the Constructors' Championship twice (1980 and 1981), and two Williams drivers won the Drivers' Championship: Alan Jones in 1980 and Keke Rosberg in 1982.

Saudia was the main sponsor of the 2018 and 2019 Diriyah ePrix. They are the official airline of Formula E, with one of their planes, a Boeing 777-300ER, painted in a special livery featuring an eagle head with the Spark SRT05e Gen2 car behind it.

In November 2022, Newcastle United announced Saudia as the club’s official tour airline partner.

In March 2023, Aston Martin F1 Team announced Saudia as the team's official global airline partner in a multi-year deal.

== Destinations ==
A retro Saudia Boeing 747 at its hub airport, King Abdulaziz International Airport

Saudia operates to 148 destinations as of September 2025. The airline plans to reach 250 destinations by 2030.

=== Codeshare agreements ===
Saudia has codeshare agreements with SkyTeam partners and with the following airlines:

- Aegean Airlines
- Aeroflot
- Aerolíneas Argentinas
- Air France
- Air India
- Air Mauritius
- China Eastern Airlines
- Delta Air Lines
- Etihad Airways
- Ethiopian Airlines
- Flyadeal
- Garuda Indonesia
- Gulf Air
- ITA Airways
- Kenya Airways
- Korean Air
- KLM
- Kuwait Airways
- Malaysia Airlines
- Middle East Airlines
- Oman Air
- Philippine Airlines
- Royal Air Maroc
- Scandinavian Airlines
- Vietnam Airlines

== Fleet ==
=== Current fleet ===
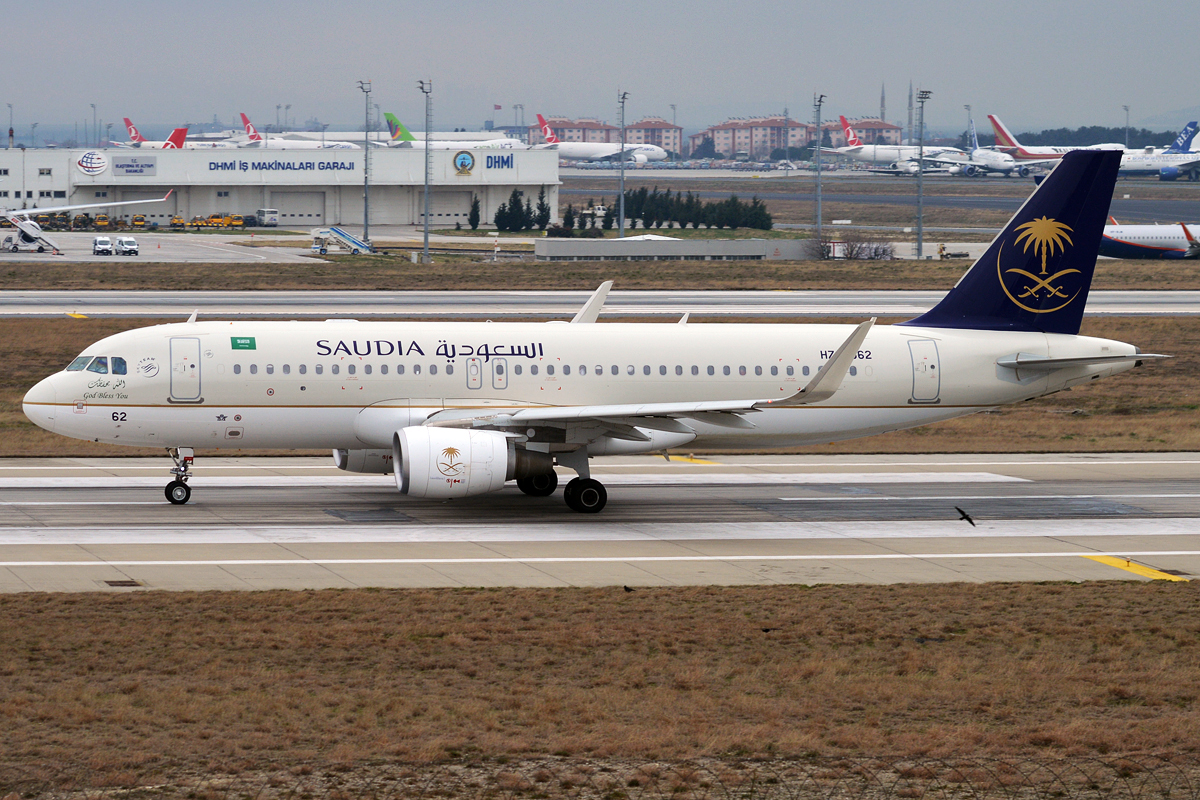
Saudia Airbus A320-200

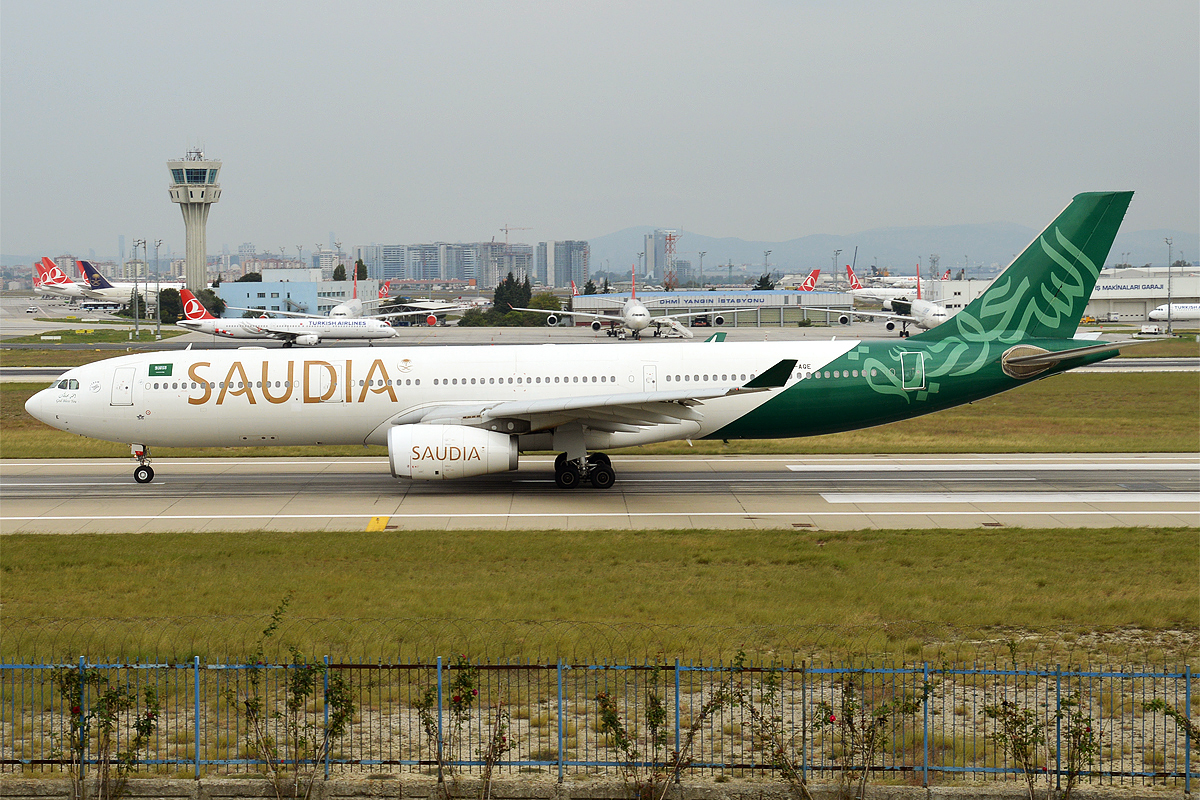
Saudia Airbus A330-300 in the special Saudi National Day livery

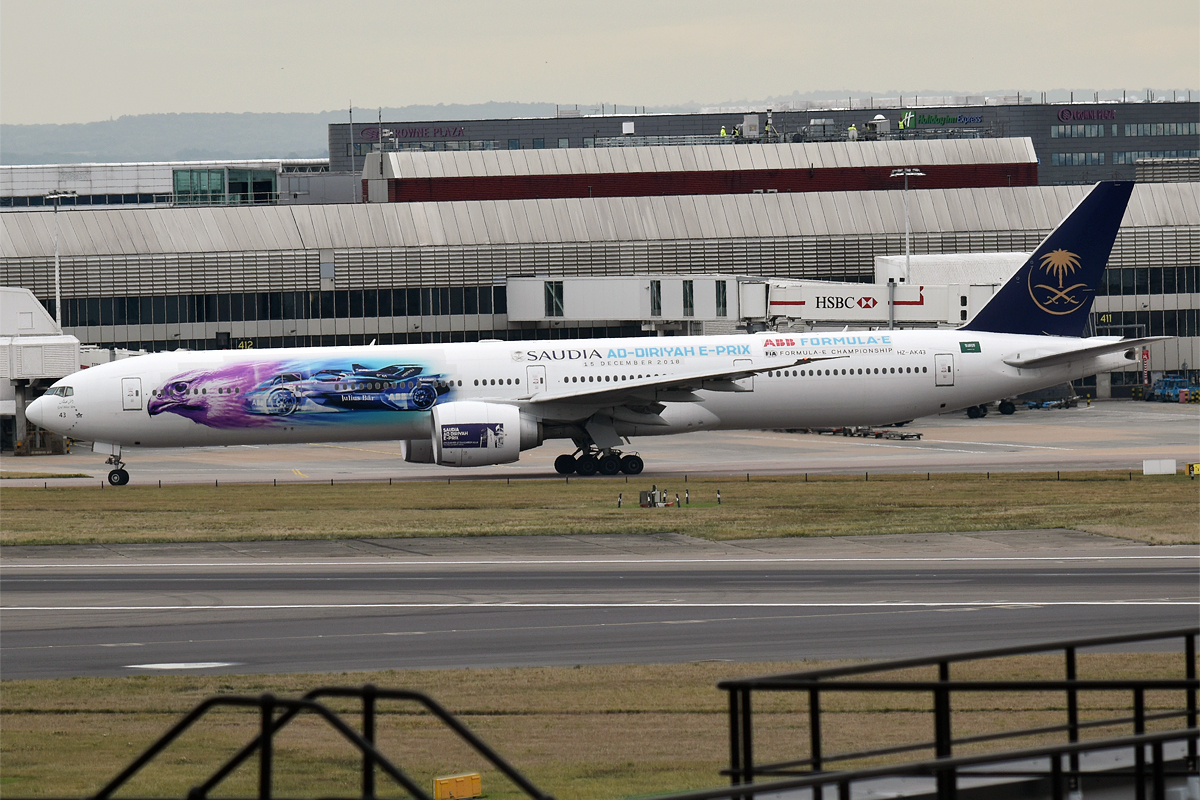
Saudia Boeing 777-300ER in the special Formula E livery

As of September 2025, Saudia operates the following aircraft:

Saudia fleet
Aircraft	In service	Orders	Passengers				Notes
Aircraft	In service	Orders	F	J	Y	Total	Notes
Airbus A320-200	37	—	—	12	132	144	
Airbus A320-200	37	—	—	20	90	110	
Airbus A321-200	15	—	—	20	145	165	
Airbus A321neo	12	62	—	20	168	188	
Airbus A321XLR	—	15	TBA				
Airbus A330-300	31	—	—	36	262	298	
Airbus A330-300	31	—	—	36	252	288	
Airbus A330-300	31	—	—	30	300	330	
Boeing 777-300ER	37	—	12	36	242	290	2 in VIP configuration.
Boeing 777-300ER	37	—	—	30	351	381	2 in VIP configuration.
Boeing 777-300ER	37	—	—	30	383	413	2 in VIP configuration.
Boeing 777-300ER	37	—	—	12	393	405	2 in VIP configuration.
Boeing 777-300ER	37	—	—	14	478	492	2 leased from Air Atlanta Europe.
Boeing 787-9	13	18	—	24	274	298	Order with 10 options.
Boeing 787-10	8	21	—	24	333	357	Order with 10 options.
Total	153	116					

=== Historic fleet ===
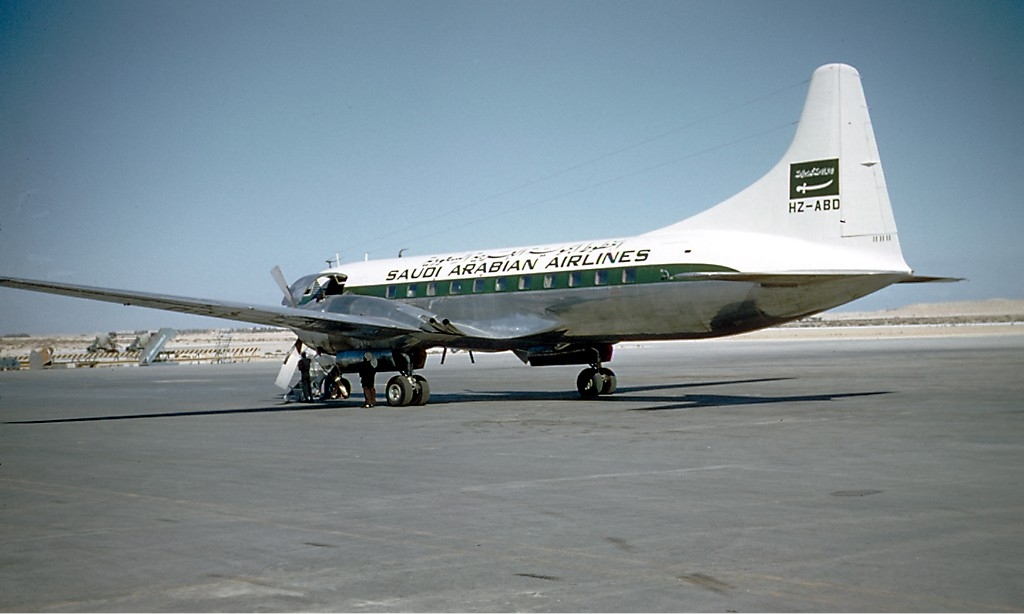
Saudia Convair 340 in 1959

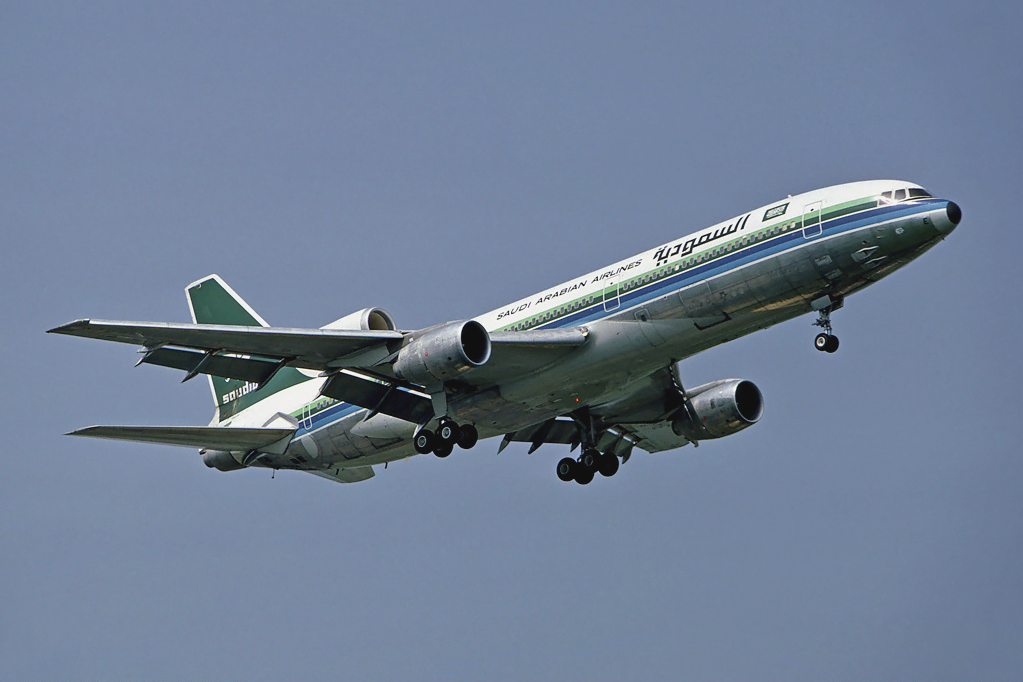
Saudia Lockheed L-1011 TriStar in 1985

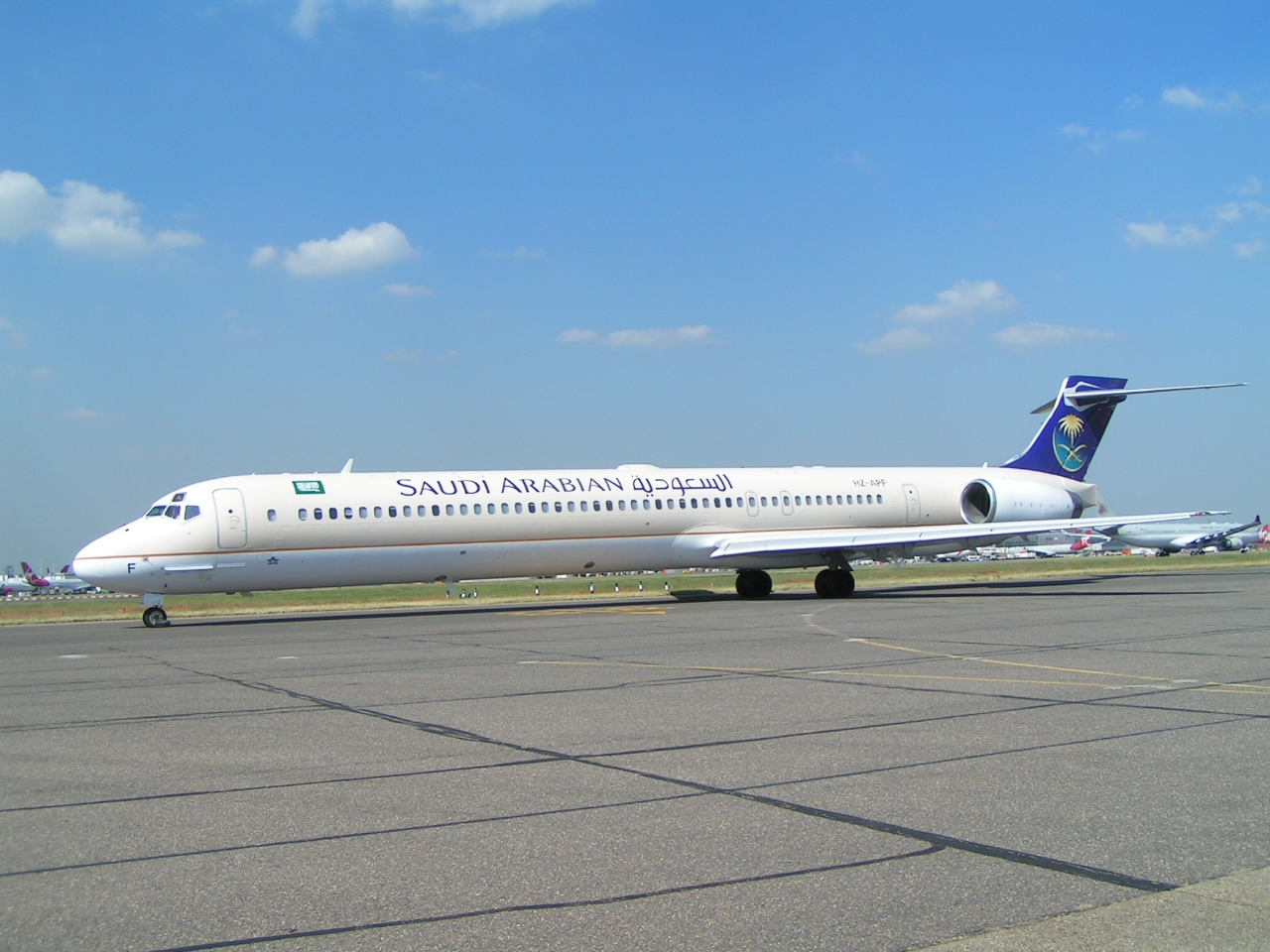
Saudia McDonnell Douglas MD-90 in 2008

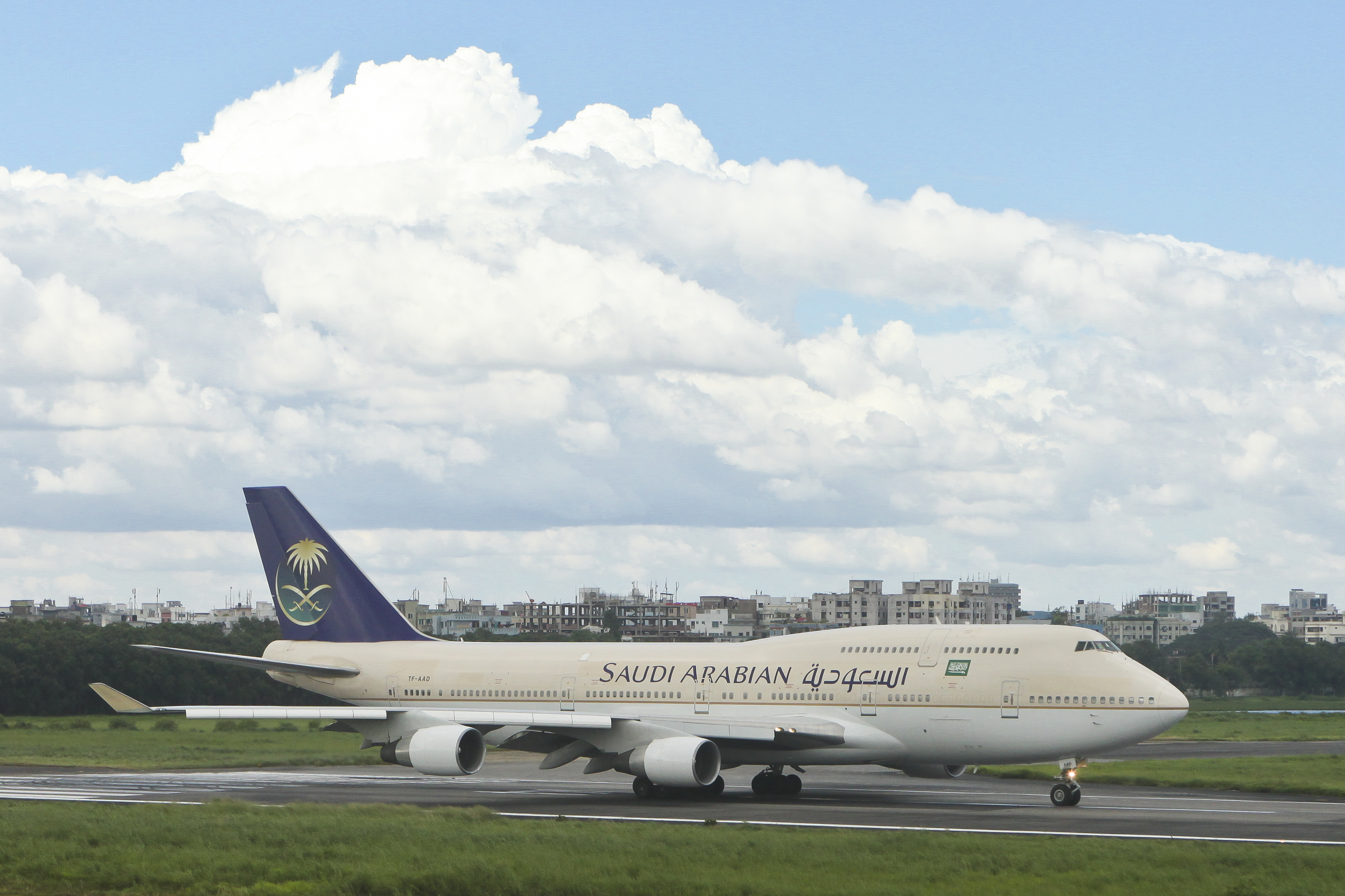
Saudia Boeing 747-400 leased from Air Atlanta Icelandic in 2012

Saudia formerly operated the following aircraft:

Fleet history
Aircraft	Total	Introduced	Retired	Notes
Airbus A330-300	1	2017	2023	HZ-AQ30 destroyed as flight SV458 during the Sudanese civil war.
Boeing 747-8F	2	2013	2021	Sub-leased to other operators.
Embraer 170	15	2005	2016	All sold to AerFin in December 2016

=== Other aircraft ===
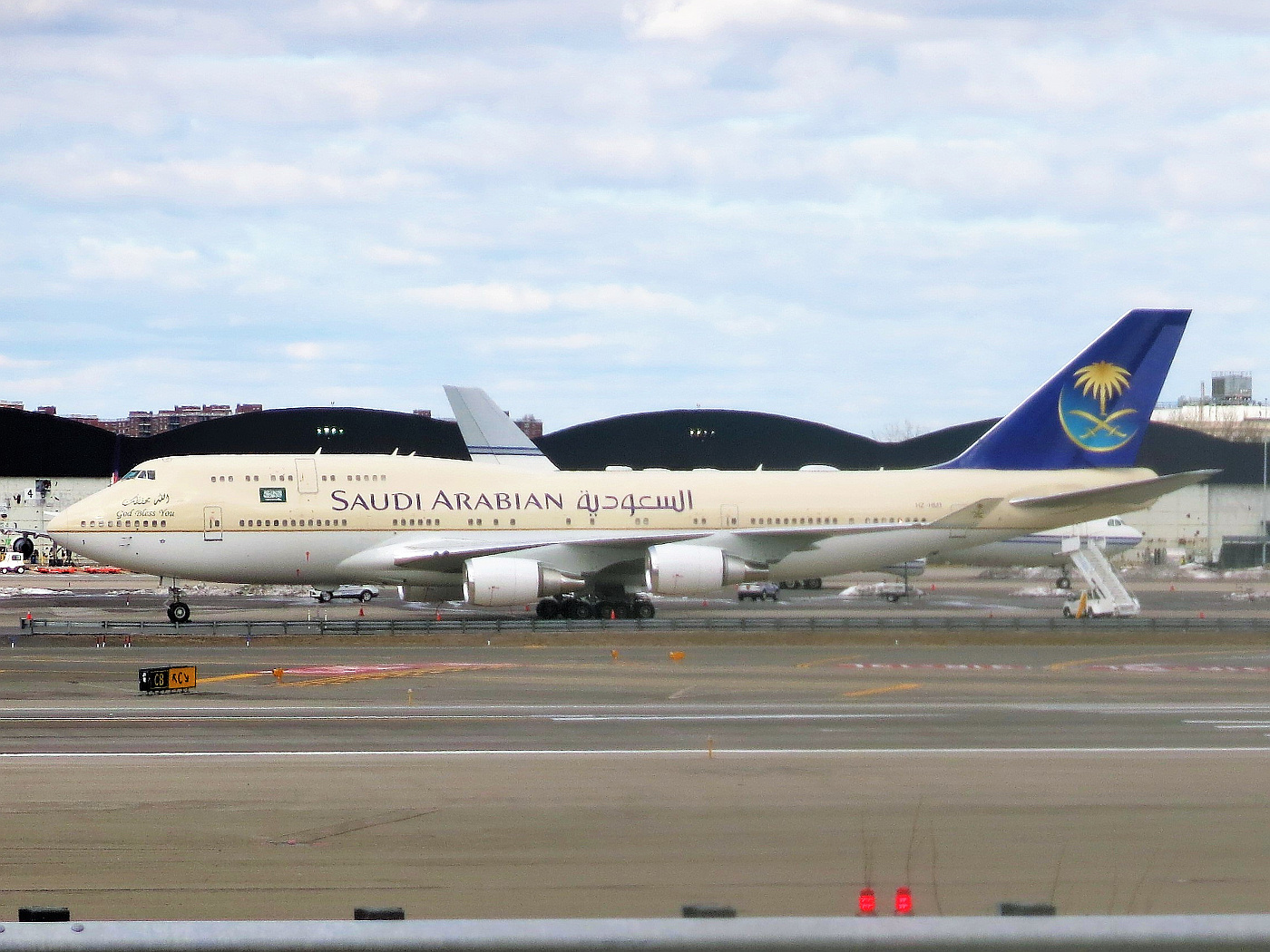
Saudi Royal Flight Boeing 747-400 parked at JFK Airport wearing its former livery, 2018. The above A340-200 is parked behind it.

Saudia Special Flight Services, VIP flights, and Private Aviation operate the following, several of which sport the airline's livery.

Some military C-130s are also painted with the Saudia colors and are flown by Royal Saudi Air Force crews to support Saudi official activities in the region and Europe. Since 2017, two mobile escalators (TEC Hünert MFT 500-01) travel with the King and transported by separate aircraft.

In 2021, the Saudi royal flight's single Boeing 747-400 registered as HZ-HM1 was painted in a new livery.

As of January 2022, all the Saudi royal flight aircraft were going to be operated by a private company, and all aircraft were to be painted in another livery.

== In-flight services ==
The inflight magazine of Saudia is called Ahlan Wasahlan (أهلاً وسهلاً "Hello and Welcome"). No alcoholic beverages or pork are served on board in accordance with Islamic dietary laws. Select Airbus A320, Airbus A330-300, Boeing 787-9, Boeing 787-10, and Boeing 777-300ER aircraft are equipped with Wi-Fi and mobile network connectivity on board. Most aircraft also offer onboard specialized prayer areas and a recorded prayer is played before takeoff.

== Incidents and accidents ==
- On 25 September 1959, a Saudia Douglas DC-4/C-54A-5-DO (registration HZ-AAF), performed a belly landing shortly after take-off from Jeddah. The cause of the accident was gust locks not deactivated by the mechanic, followed by a stall. All 67 passengers and five crew members survived.
- On 24 June 1967, a Douglas C-47 (reg. HZ-AAM) crashed en route to Jeddah from Najran Airport; all three crew members and 13 of the 14 passengers onboard were killed.
- On 9 February 1968, a Douglas C-47 (reg. HZ-AAE) was damaged beyond economic repair at an unknown location.
- On 10 November 1970, a Douglas DC-3 on a flight from Amman Civil Airport, Jordan, to King Khalid International Airport, Riyadh, Saudi Arabia, was hijacked and diverted to Damascus International Airport, Syria.
- On 11 July 1972, a Douglas C-47B (reg. HZ-AAK) was damaged beyond economic repair in an accident at Tabuk Airport.
- On 2 January 1976, Saudia Flight 5130, a McDonnell Douglas DC-10-30CF, leased from ONA undershot the runway at Istanbul, Turkey, crash landed, tearing off the #1 engine and causing the left wing to catch fire. All passengers and crew evacuated safely. The aircraft was written off.

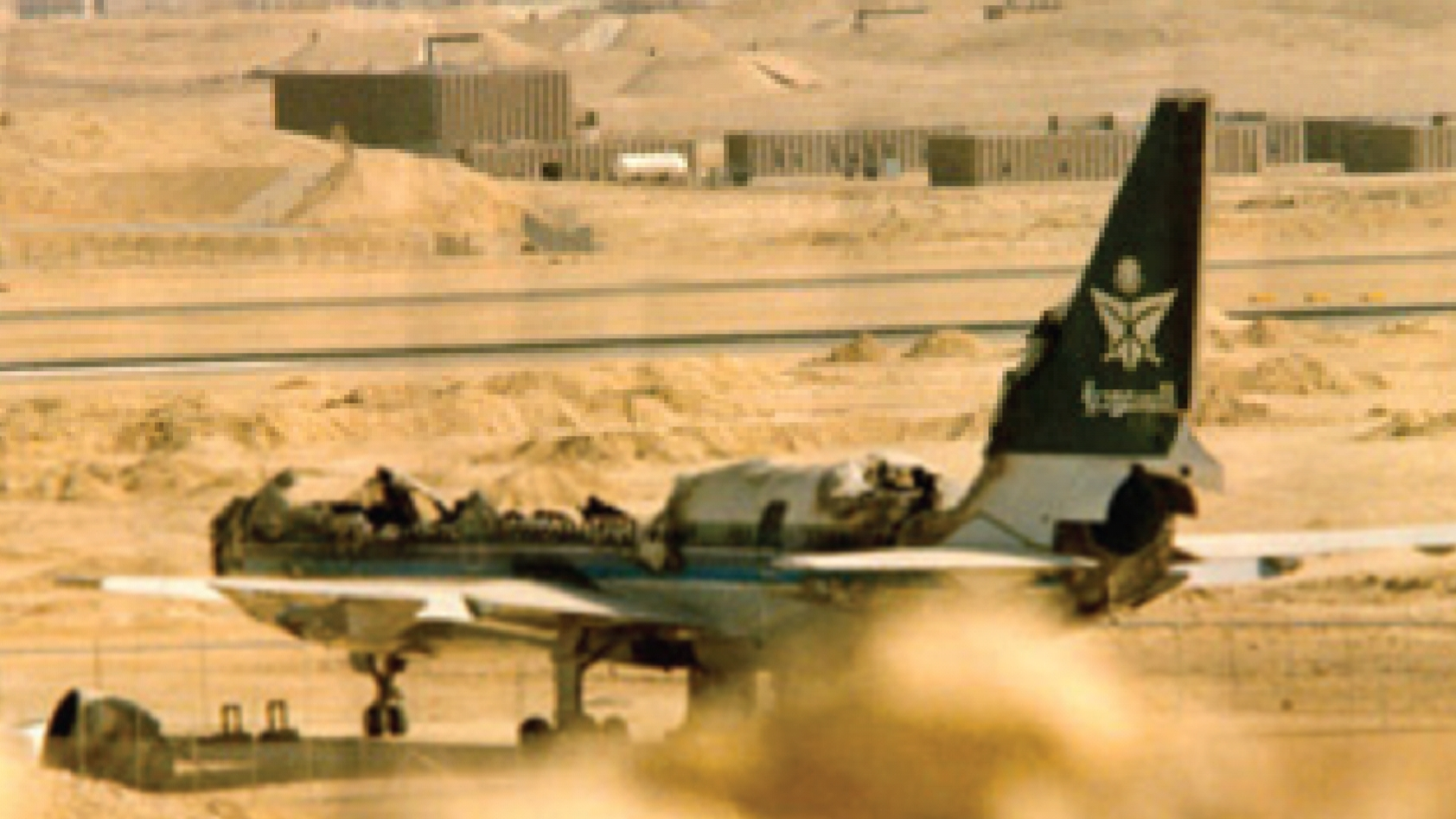
The aftermath of the fire aboard Saudia Flight 163 in 1980

- On 19 August 1980, Saudia Flight 163, a Lockheed L-1011-200 TriStar (HZ-AHK), operating Karachi-Riyadh-Jeddah, was completely destroyed by fire at Riyadh airport with the loss of all 301 people on board due to delays in evacuating the aircraft. This was the deadliest accident experienced by Saudia until 312 were killed in the loss of Flight 763 over 16 years later.
- On 22 December 1980, Saudia Flight 162, a Lockheed L-1011-200 TriStar, operating Dhahran to Karachi, experienced an explosive decompression, penetrating the passenger cabin. The hole sucked out two passengers and depressurized the cabin.
- On 5 April 1984, a Saudia Lockheed L-1011 TriStar on final approach to Damascus, Syria, from Jeddah, Saudi Arabia, was hijacked by a Syrian national. The hijacker demanded to be taken to Istanbul, Turkey, but changed his mind and requested to go to Stockholm, Sweden. After landing in Istanbul to refuel, the hijacker was arrested after the pilot pushed him out of the emergency exit.
- On 12 November 1996, a Saudia Boeing 747-100B (HZ-AIH), operating flight 763, was involved in the 1996 Charkhi Dadri mid-air collision. The aircraft was on its way from New Delhi, India, to Dhahran, Saudi Arabia, when a Kazakhstan Airlines Ilyushin Il-76 (UN-76435) collided with it over the village of Charkhi Dadri, about 45 miles west of New Delhi. Flight 763 was carrying 312 people, all of whom, along with 37 more on the Kazakh aircraft, died, for a total of 349 fatalities. The loss of Flight 763 alone remains Saudia's worst accident in terms of fatalities. The accident overall also remains the world's deadliest mid-air collision.
- On 6 September 1997, A Boeing 737-200 operating as Saudia Flight 1861 (reg. HZ-AGM) from Najran was accelerating on its takeoff roll when the No. 2 engine spooled up without any pilot input, the captain attempted to abort the takeoff but the engine continued to increase in power. The plane veered to the left of the runway, causing the main landing gears to collapse and tearing the right engine off the wing. It skidded for a few meters before stopping on the sand, a fire broke out but all 85 occupants managed to escape.
- On 14 October 2000, Saudia Flight 115, flying from Jeddah to London was hijacked en route by two men who claimed they were armed with explosives. The hijackers commandeered the Boeing 777-200ER (HZ-AKH) to Baghdad, Iraq, where all 90 passengers and 15 crew members were safely released. The two hijackers, identified as Lieutenant Faisal Naji Hamoud Al-Bilawi and First Lieutenant Ayesh Ali Hussein Al-Fareedi, both Saudi citizens, were arrested and later extradited to Saudi Arabia in 2003.
- On 23 August 2001, at Kuala Lumpur International Airport, Malaysia, a Boeing 747-300 (reg. HZ-AIO) suffered nose damage as it entered a monsoon drainage ditch while it was being taxied by maintenance staff from the hangar to the gate before a return flight to Saudi Arabia. None of the six crew members on board at the time were injured, but the aircraft was written off.
- On 8 September 2005, a Boeing 747 travelling from Colombo, Sri Lanka, to Jeddah, Saudi Arabia, carrying mostly Sri Lankan nationals to take up employment in the Kingdom, received a false alarm claiming that a bomb had been planted on board. The aircraft returned to Colombo. During the evacuation, there was a passenger stampede in the wake of which one Sri Lankan woman died, 62 were injured, and 17 were hospitalized. The aircraft had taken on a load of 420 passengers in Colombo. According to the Civil Aviation Authority of Sri Lanka, the probable cause was a "Breakdown of timely and effective communication amongst Aerodrome Controller and Ground Handling (SriLankan Airlines) personnel had prevented a timely dispatch of the stepladders to the aircraft to deplane the passengers on time, which resulted in the Pilot-In-Command to order an emergency evacuation of the passengers through slides after being alarmed by the bomb threat."
- On 25 May 2008, an Air Atlanta Icelandic aircraft operating for Saudia as Flight 810 (TF-ARS) from Prince Mohammad bin Abdulaziz International Airport, Medina made an unscheduled landing at Zia International Airport (now Hazrat Shahjalal International Airport), Dhaka, Bangladesh. During the roll, the tower controller reported that he saw a fire on the right-hand wing. Upon vacating the runway, the crew received a fire indication for engine number three. The fire extinguisher was activated and all engines were shut down. The aircraft, a Boeing 747-357, which was damaged beyond repair, was successfully evacuated. Only minor injuries were incurred. Investigations revealed a fuel leak where the fuel enters the front spar for engine number three.
- On 5 January 2014, a leased Boeing 767-300ER operating under Saudia was forced to make an emergency landing at Prince Mohammad bin Abdulaziz International Airport in Medina after the right landing gear failed to deploy. Fourteen passengers were minorly injured and three passengers were seriously injured from the evacuation via the emergency slides. The aircraft was substantially damaged and repaired.
- On 5 August 2014, a Boeing 747-400 (reg. HZ-AIX) operating as Flight 871 from Manila to Riyadh veered off runway 24 of Ninoy Aquino International Airport in Manila, Philippines, while positioning for takeoff. No one on the plane or ground was injured.
- On 11 November 2017, a MyCargo Airlines Boeing 747-400 freighter operated by Saudia Cargo (reg. TC-ACR) as flight SV916 from Maastricht to Jeddah veered off to the right of the runway during the takeoff roll in after a loss of thrust on the #4 engine caused by a compressor stall. The pilots did not immediately retard the thrust levers, and more standard procedures weren't followed as the plane swerved due to 'startle effect'. The aircraft was repaired soon after.
- On 21 May 2018, an Onur Air-leased Airbus A330-200 registered as TC-OCH, operating as Flight 3818 from Medina, Saudi Arabia, to Dhaka, Bangladesh, was diverted to Jeddah, Saudi Arabia, after suffering a malfunction with the nose landing gear. It was forced to make an emergency landing with its nose gear retracted. No injuries were reported.
- On 20 June 2022, a Boeing 777-368 operating as Flight 862 from Riyadh, Saudi Arabia, veered off and got stuck at a taxiway in Manila after landing. All 420 people on board were unharmed.
- On 15 April 2023, an Airbus A330-343 operating as Flight 458 was destroyed while preparing to take off in Khartoum Airport, Sudan, during the 2023 Sudan clashes. The aircraft, registered as HZ-AQ30, was hit by a tracer bullet, causing its hull to burn and its tail section to collapse. Despite the damage, all occupants onboard managed to escape without any injuries and were evacuated to the Saudi Embassy in Khartoum. Another Saudi plane was a few hundred kilometres away from airport and it did not land. It did a U-turn in order to avoid being shot down.
- On 11 July 2024, an Airbus A330-343, registered HZ-AQ28, operating as Flight 792 from King Khalid International Airport, Saudi Arabia, to Peshawar International Airport, Pakistan, caught fire after a minor issue caused the landing gear to catch fire. All 276 passengers and 21 crew members were evacuated via the emergency slides safely. At least 10 passengers sustained injuries.
- On 17 June 2025, a Boeing 777-300ER, registered HZ-AK32, operating as Flight 5276 (Hajj Flight) from King Abdulaziz International Airport, Jeddah, to Soekarno Hatta International Airport, Jakarta, received a fake bomb threat via email. The aircraft diverted to Kualanamu International Airport, Medan, and all passengers and crew were evacuated.
- On 21 June 2025, an Airbus A330-343, registered EC-NOF, operating as Flight 5688 (Hajj Flight) from Muscat International Airport, Muscat, to Juanda International Airport, Surabaya, received a fake bomb threat via telephone. The aircraft again diverted to Kualanamu International Airport, Medan, and all passengers and crew were evacuated.
- On 8 October 2026, an Airbus A320-214 was completely destroyed by a Houthi attack, at King Khalid International Airport, Riyadh. Aircraft's registration has not been confirmed yet.

== See also ==
- List of airlines of Saudi Arabia
- List of airports in Saudi Arabia
