= Saudia Cargo =

Saudi Arabian airfreight flag carrier

Saudia Cargo السعودية للشحن

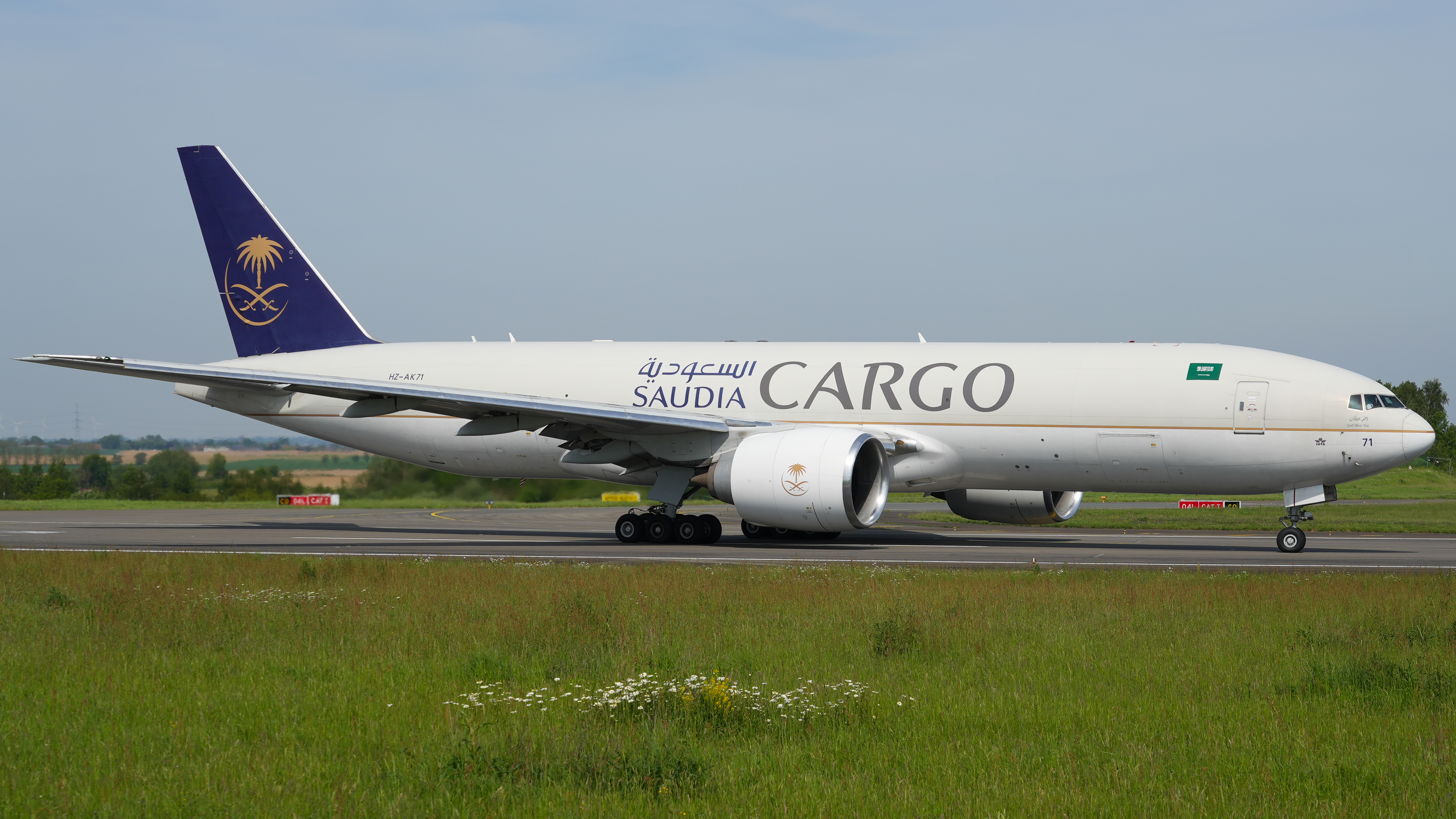
- Founded: 2007; 19 years ago
- Alliance: SkyTeam Cargo
- Parent company: Saudia
- Headquarters: Jeddah, Saudi Arabia
- Key people: Teddy Zebitz, CEO
- Website: saudiacargo.com

Saudia Cargo (Note: Arabic: السعودية للشحن (romanized: as-Suʿūdiyyah li-l-Šaḥn)) is the cargo division of Saudia, the flag carrier of Saudi Arabia.

== History ==
A subsidiary of Saudia the first flag carrier of Saudi Arabia, the company was established as part of a privatization in 2007. In 2008, the company joined the IATA interest group Cargo iQ. Saudia Cargo provides multi-specialized cargo handling as it operates a fleet of 8 freighter aircraft composed of 747-400F and 777F to 13 cargo destinations as well as over 58 belly international destinations across six continents. The CEO is Omar Talal Hariri, a member of the Cargo Committee of the International Air Transport Association (IATA).

In September 2018, the company announced two new terminal projects for King Abdulaziz International Airport in Jeddah, and King Khalid International Airport in Riyadh scheduled to be completed in 2022. It has also expanded to Cairo and Dubai.

In 2019, Saudia Cargo sponsored the Saudi International Golf Tournament as the formal logistics partner.

== Destinations ==
Country	City	Airport	Notes	Refs
Australia	Geelong	Avalon Airport		
Belgium	Brussels	Brussels Airport		
Belgium	Liege	Liege Airport		
Bangladesh	Dhaka	Hazrat Shahjalal International Airport		
Chad	N'Djamena	N'Djamena International Airport		
China	Guangzhou	Guangzhou Baiyun International Airport		
China	Hong Kong	Hong Kong International Airport		
China	Shanghai	Shanghai Pudong International Airport		
Ethiopia	Addis Ababa	Addis Ababa Bole International Airport		
Germany	Frankfurt	Frankfurt Airport		
India	Mumbai	Chhatrapati Shivaji Maharaj International Airport		
Italy	Milan	Milan Malpensa Airport		
Kenya	Nairobi	Jomo Kenyatta International Airport		
Netherlands	Amsterdam	Amsterdam Airport Schiphol		
Netherlands	Maastricht	Maastricht Aachen Airport		
Saudi Arabia	Jeddah	King Abdulaziz International Airport	Hub	
Saudi Arabia	Riyadh	King Khalid International Airport	Hub	
South Africa	Johannesburg	O. R. Tambo International Airport		
Sudan	Khartoum	Khartoum International Airport		
United Arab Emirates	Dubai	Al Maktoum International Airport		
United Arab Emirates	Sharjah	Sharjah International Airport		
United States	Houston	George Bush Intercontinental Airport		
United States	New York City	John F. Kennedy International Airport		
Vietnam	Ho Chi Minh City	Tan Son Nhat International Airport		

== Fleet ==
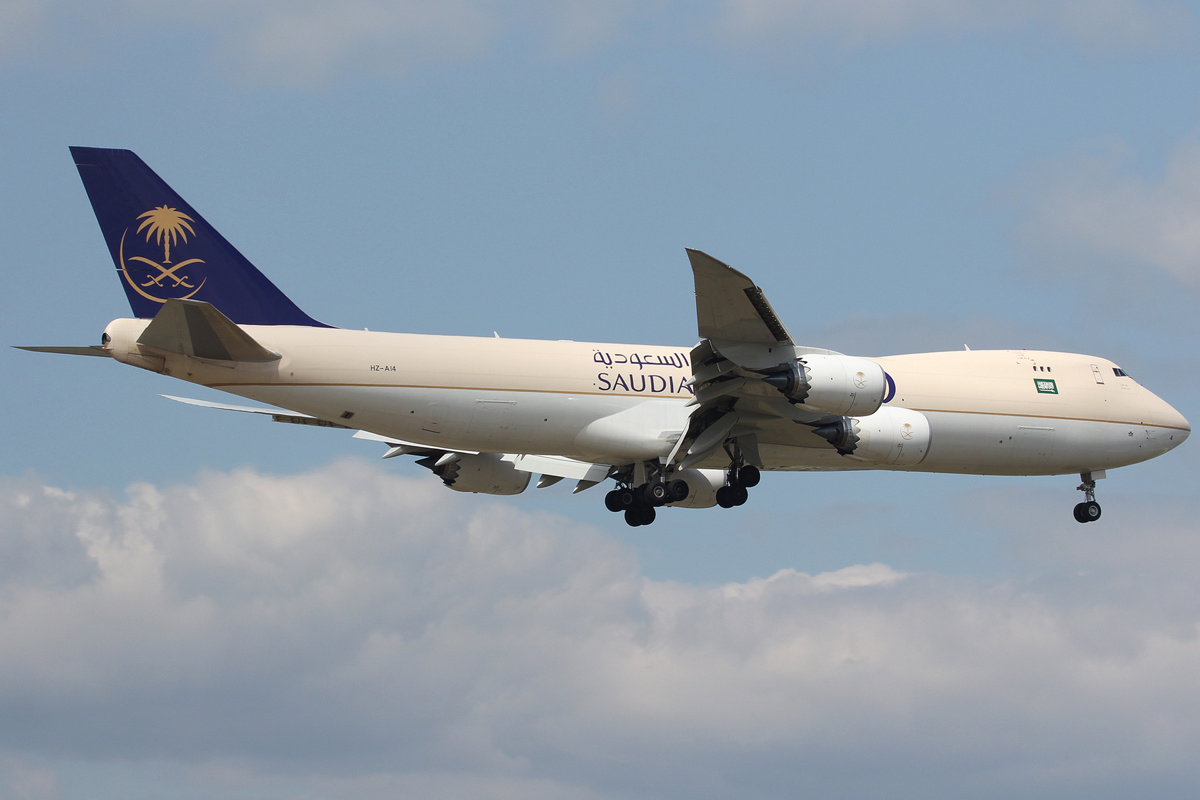
A now-retired Saudia Cargo Boeing 747-8 Freighter

Saudia Cargo has a fleet of 747-400BDSF, 747-400F and 777 Freighter aircraft. They serve an international group of clients. As of December 2021, the Saudia Cargo fleet consists of the following aircraft:

Saudia Cargo fleet
Aircraft	In service	Orders	Notes
Boeing 747-400BDSF	2	—	
Boeing 747-400F	2	—	
Boeing 777	4	—	
Total	8	—	

== See also ==
- List of airlines of Saudi Arabia
- List of airports in Saudi Arabia
