= Sudan Airways =

Flag carrier of Sudan

Sudan Airways الخطوط الجوية السودانية
IATA	ICAO	Call sign
SD	SUD	SUDANAIR
- Founded: February 1946; Khartoum, Sudan
- Commenced operations: July 1947; 79 years ago
- Hubs: Khartoum International Airport
- Fleet size: 2
- Destinations: 12
- Parent company: Government of Sudan
- Headquarters: Khartoum, Sudan
- Key people: Yasir Timo (CEO)
- Website: www.sudanair.com

Sudan Airways (Arabic: الخطوط الجوية السودانية) is the state-owned flag carrier airline of Sudan, headquartered in Khartoum.

It is one of the oldest African carriers. The airline was formed in February 1946 and started scheduled operations in July the following year. As of December 2011, Sudan Airways had 1,700 employees. The airline has been included in the list of air carriers banned in the European Union since March 2010.

== History ==
An Air Advisory Board was formed in 1945 to assess on the feasibility of starting air services in the country, recommending to set up an air company with the aid of foreign carriers that would provide their technical and management expertise. Initially, the new airline would restrict its operations to on-demand services. Sudan Airways was formed in February 1946 with the technical assistance of Airwork Limited, and the commercial support of Sudan Railways.

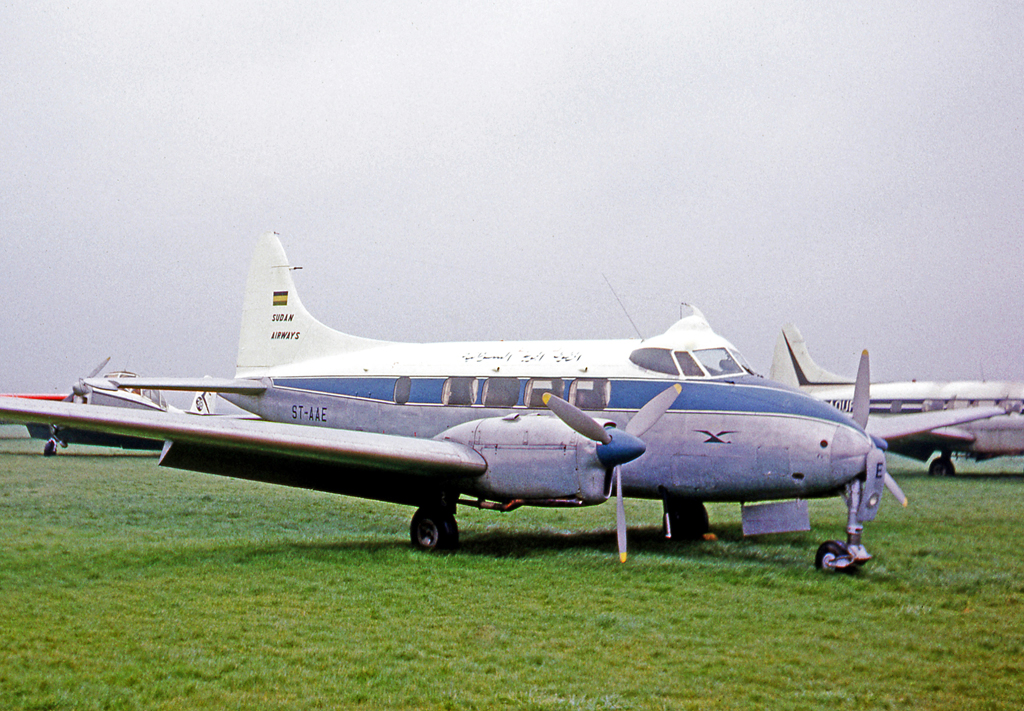
De Havilland Dove of Sudan Airways in 1967

The initial fleet was composed of four de Havilland Doves, with test flights commencing in April 1947. The first scheduled operations were launched in July the same year, with the first timetable being published in September. Khartoum became Sudan Airways' hub from the very beginning. From there, the carrier started flying four different services all across the Sudanese territory, as well as to the not yet independent Eritrea. The first routes the company flew linked Khartoum with Asmara, Atbara, El Fashir, El Obeid, Geneina, Juba, Kassala, Malakal, and Port Sudan, all of them served by de Havilland Dove aircraft. An Airwork Viking flew the Blackbushe–Khartoum long-haul route. A fifth Dove was ordered in January 1948. That year, a route to Wadi Halfa was launched. Sudan Railways withdrew from the airline's management in 1949; the government and Airwork continued running the company thereafter.

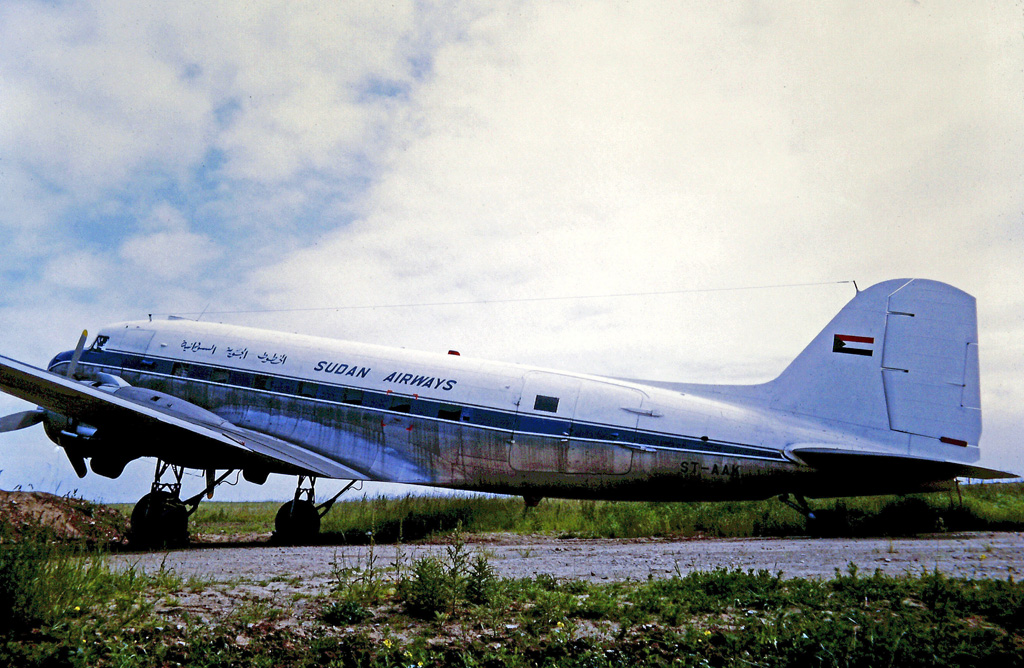
Sudan Airways Douglas C-47B in 1971

Kassala and Asmara were removed from the airline's list of destinations in 1952. In February that year, a fifth Dove was phased in. There was such a demand for flying that the toilets on the Doves were removed to make room for more seats, with these aircraft even carrying passengers in the cockpit. This prompted the airline to look for newer and bigger airliners, with the Douglas DC-3 and the de Havilland Heron being under consideration. Flown with Austers and Doves, by March 1953 the carrier was operating a domestic network that was 4,800 kilometres (3,000 mi) long. That year, the carrier incorporated the first four DC-3s into the fleet. The boost in capacity allowed the company to carry both passengers and mail, to introduce new regular routes to Cairo and Wad Medani, and to carry out aerial survey tasks for the government. Also in 1953, the Chadian city of Abeche was made part of the route network, whereas regular flights to Jeddah were launched in June 1954. Services to Athens commenced in the mid-1950s. Two more DC-3s were bought in 1956. In 1958, after taking office, the Supreme Council of the Armed Forces decided to expand the carrier's international operations. A seventh DC-3 was incorporated into the fleet that year. Long-haul services started in June 1959 between Khartoum and London via Rome –the so-called "Blue Nile" service– using a Viscount 831 that was acquired new earlier that year in a joint venture with British United Airways. Beirut was added to the destination network in November the same year. Also in 1959, the airline joined IATA.

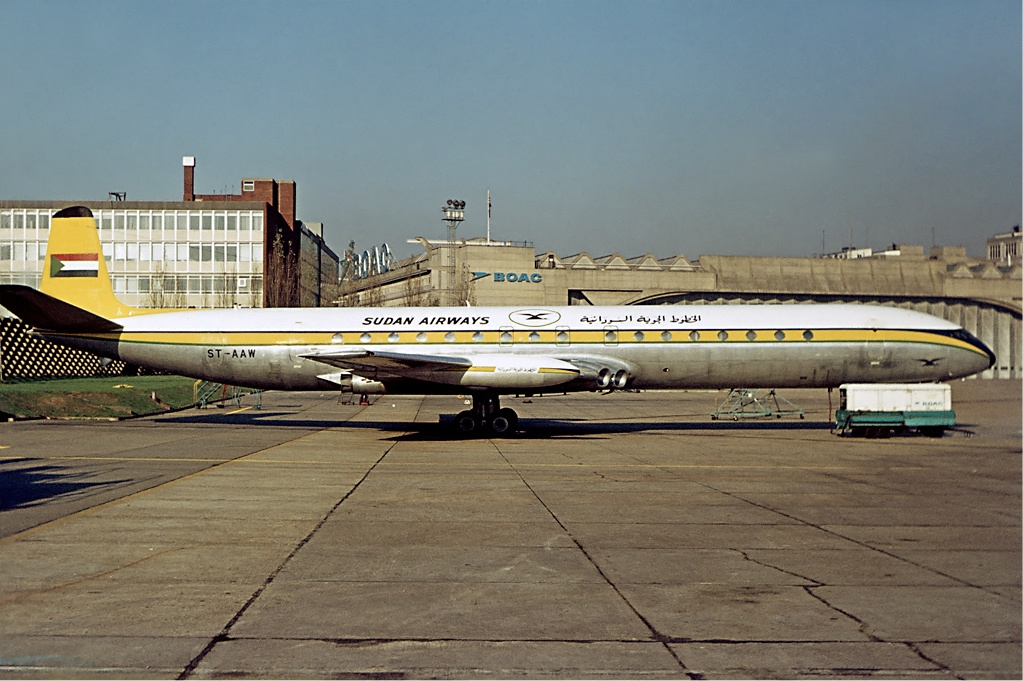
A Sudan Airways Comet 4C at London Heathrow Airport in 1972. The airline took delivery of the first aircraft of the type in November 1962.

By April 1960, the fleet included seven DC-3s, four Doves, and a Viscount 831. The latter aircraft was used to resume operations to Asmara in December 1960. Aimed at replacing the DC-3s and the Doves in domestic and regional routes, the airline acquired three Fokker F27s in October that year; these were delivered in early 1962, with the first of them being deployed on domestic routes, making Sudan Airways the first African airline in operating the type. Also in 1962, two Comet 4Cs were bought in May, intended as a replacement of the Viscount service; Sudan Airways had considered the acquisition of two jets for deployment on the ″Blue Nile″ route since the frequency on the service was increased to twice weekly in 1961. The airline took delivery of the first Comet in November 1962, and the second aircraft of the type was delivered a month later. Comets commenced flying the ″Blue Nile″ service in January 1963; that year, the frequency was again increased to operate three times a week. The ″Blue Nile″ service first served Frankfurt in May 1963. Also in 1963, a fourth Friendship was ordered. In 1967, the company became a corporation run on a commercial basis; also, three Twin Otters were ordered as a replacement for the DC-3s. The first of these aircraft joined the fleet in 1968; the second aircraft of the type delivered to the company was the 100th produced by de Havilland Canada.

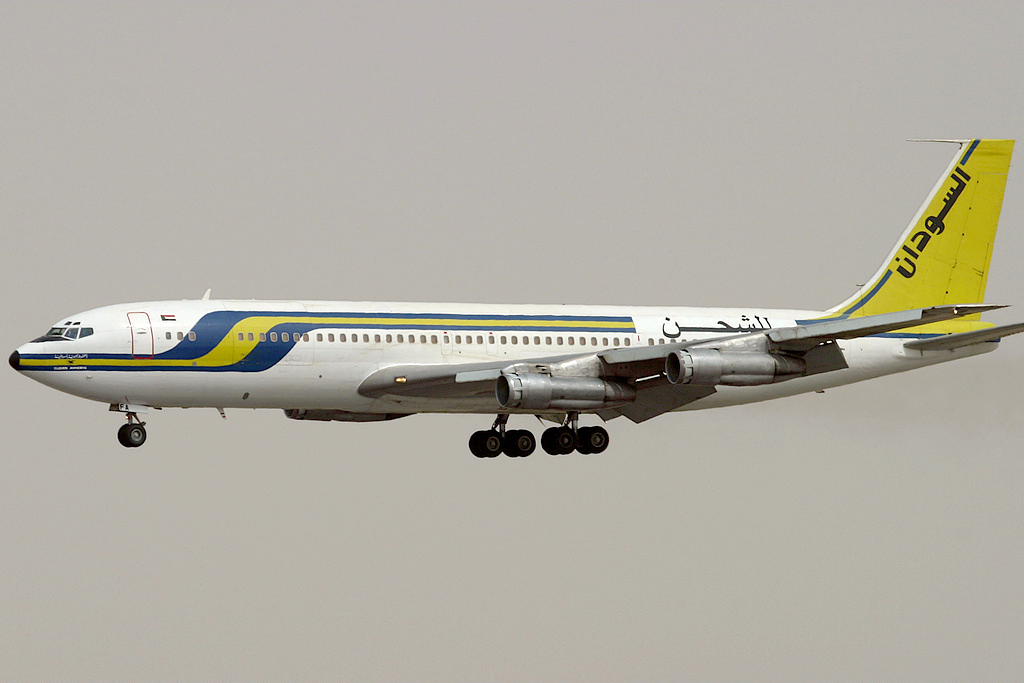
A Sudan Airways Boeing 707-320C on final approach to Sharjah International Airport in 2006. As part of an order that had been placed in 1973 including two aircraft of the type, the pictured aircraft, registered ST-AFA, entered the fleet in 1974.

By March 1970, the route network totaled 20,715 kilometres (12,872 mi), with international destinations including Aden, Addis Ababa, Asmara, Athens, Beirut, Cairo, Entebbe, Fort Lamy, Jeddah, London, Nairobi and Rome. At this time, the fleet was composed of two Comet 4Cs, three DC-3s, four F-27s and three Twin Otters. The last passenger DC-3 left the fleet in 1971. In 1972, the Comets were put on sale and were replaced by two Boeing 707s leased from British Midland. Sudan Airways ordered two Boeing 707-320Cs in 1973, for delivery in June and July 1974. Pending delivery of two Boeing 737-200Cs ordered a year earlier, the two Boeing 707-320Cs were part of the fleet by March 1975, along with five F-27s, three Twin Otters, and a single DC-3.

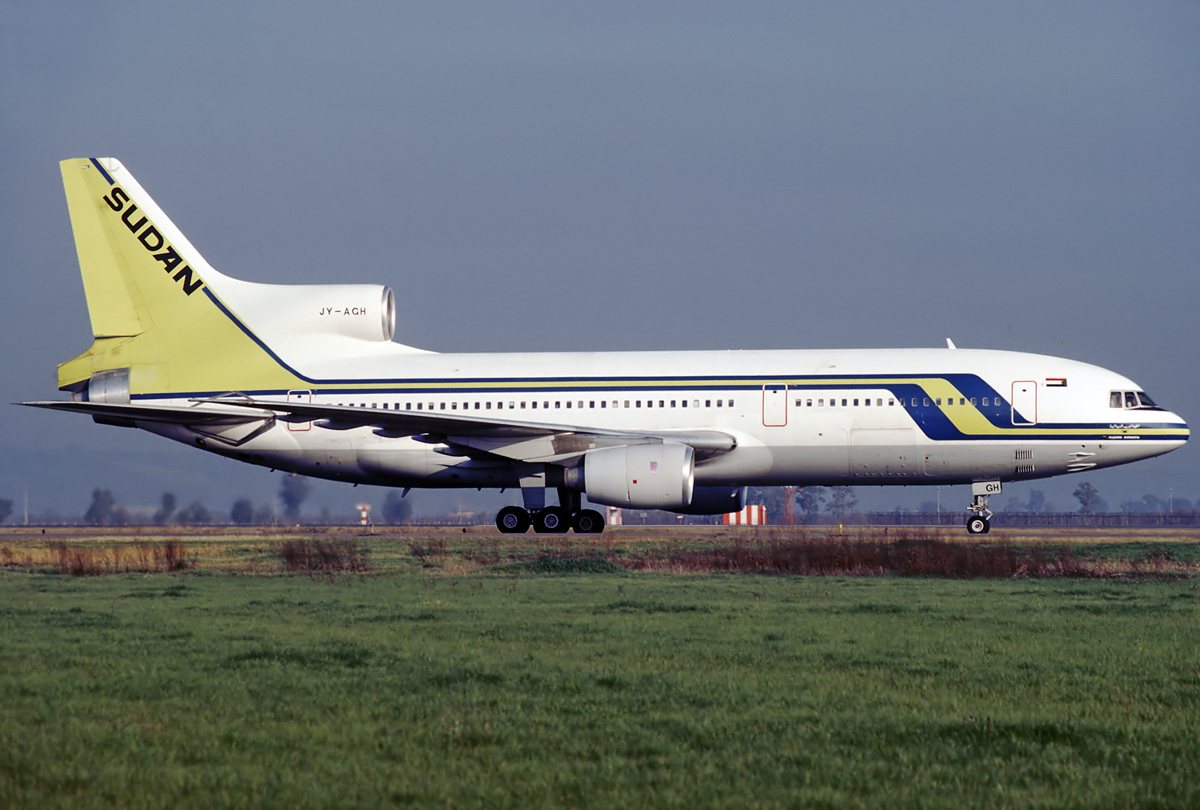
A Jordan-registered Lockheed L-1011 TriStar in Sudan Airways livery in 1987

The company had 2,362 employees at April 2000, with an aircraft park that included one Airbus A300-600, one Airbus A300-600R, three Boeing 707-320Cs, one Boeing 727-200, one Boeing 737-200C and one Fokker F27-600. By this time, the airline provided scheduled services to Abu Dhabi, Addis Ababa, Al Ain, Amman, Bangui, Cairo, Damascus, Doha, Dongola, Dubai, El Fasher, El Obeid, Al Dabbah, Geneina, Istanbul, Jeddah, Juba, Kano, Lagos, London, Malakal, Merowe, Muscat, Ndjamena, Niamey, Nyala, Paris, Port Sudan, Riyadh, Sanaa, Sharjah, Tripoli, Wadi Halfa and Wau. In 2007, the Sudanese government privatised the airline, maintaining only a 30% stake of the national carrier.

In the wake of the crash of Flight 109, in June 2008 the airline was grounded following an indefinite suspension of its operating certificate by the Sudanese government, despite the fact that it was stated as not being in connection with the accident. This decision was later rolled back, and the company was allowed to resume operations.

The Kuwaiti private group that owned 49% of the shares since 2007 sold its stake back to the state in 2011. At June of the named year, 24 destinations made up Sudan Airways' international network, including Jeddah and Riyadh in Saudi Arabia.

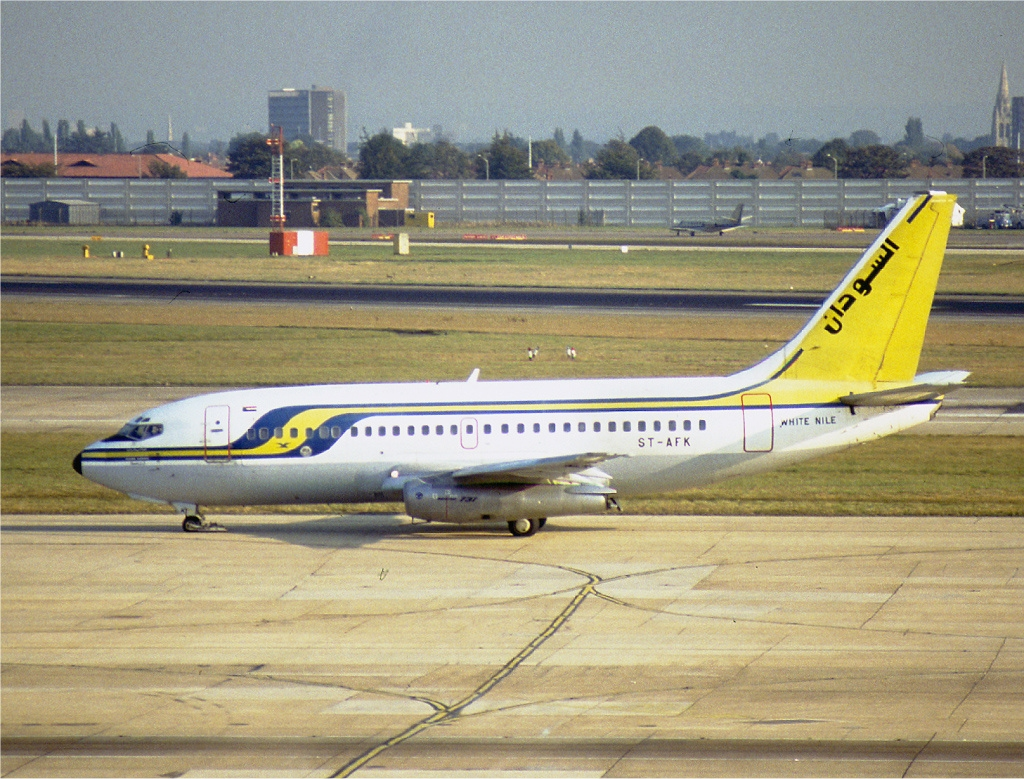
Sudan Airways Boeing 737-200 at London Heathrow Airport in 1989. The type pictured here would be later involved in a fatal accident in 2003.

Following the lifting of American sanctions in 2017, Sudan Airways announced plans to revive its fleet.

=== European Union ban ===
In late March 2010, all Sudan-based airlines were banned by the European Union (EU) from flying into or within the member states due to safety concerns. All the subsequent released ban lists included all airlines with an operator's certificate issued in Sudan as banned to operate into the member countries of the EU.

== Corporate affairs ==
As of November 2016, Sudan Airways was state-owned.

=== Key people ===
As of December 2020, the CEO position was held by Yasir Timo.

=== Headquarters ===
Sudan Airways has its headquarters in Khartoum.

== Destinations ==
Following is a list of destinations served by Sudan Airways, as of February 2023. Terminated destinations are also shown.

Country	City	Airport	Notes	Refs
Bahrain	Manama	Bahrain International Airport	Terminated	
Central African Republic	Bangui	Bangui M'Poko International Airport	Terminated	
Chad	N'Djamena	N'Djamena International Airport		
Comoros	Moroni	Prince Said Ibrahim International Airport	Terminated	
Egypt	Aswan	Aswan International Airport	Terminated	
Egypt	Cairo	Cairo International Airport		
Eritrea	Asmara	Asmara International Airport		
Ethiopia	Addis Ababa	Bole International Airport		
France	Paris	Paris-Charles de Gaulle Airport	Terminated	
Germany	Frankfurt	Frankfurt am Main Airport	Terminated	
Greece	Athens	Ellinikon International Airport	Terminated	
Italy	Rome	Leonardo da Vinci-Fiumicino Airport	Terminated	
Jordan	Amman	Queen Alia International Airport	Terminated	
Kenya	Nairobi	Jomo Kenyatta International Airport	Terminated	
Lebanon	Beirut	Beirut–Rafic Hariri International Airport	Terminated	
Libya	Tripoli	Tripoli International Airport	Terminated	
Niger	Niamey	Diori Hamani International Airport	Terminated	
Nigeria	Kano	Mallam Aminu Kano International Airport		
Nigeria	Lagos	Murtala Muhammed International Airport	Terminated	
Oman	Muscat	Muscat International Airport	Terminated	
Qatar	Doha	Doha International Airport	Terminated	
Saudi Arabia	Jeddah	King Abdulaziz International Airport		
Saudi Arabia	Riyadh	King Khalid International Airport		
Somalia	Mogadishu	Aden Adde International Airport	Terminated	
South Sudan	Juba	Juba Airport		
South Sudan	Malakal	Malakal Airport	Terminated	
South Sudan	Waw	Wau Airport	Terminated	
Sudan	Al Dabbah	Al Dabbah Airport	Terminated	
Sudan	Atbarah	Atbara Airport	Terminated	
Sudan	Dinder	Galegu Airport	Terminated	
Sudan	Dongola	Dongola Airport	Terminated	
Sudan	Al-Fashir	El Fasher Airport		
Sudan	El Obeid	El Obeid Airport		
Sudan	Er Roseires	Roseires Airport	Terminated	
Sudan	Gedaref	Gedaref Airport	Terminated	
Sudan	Geneina	Geneina Airport		
Sudan	Kasala	Kassala Airport	Terminated	
Sudan	Khartoum	Khartoum International Airport	Hub	
Sudan	Khashm El Girba	Khashm El Girba Airport	Terminated	
Sudan	Kosti	Rabak Airport	Terminated	
Sudan	Merowe	Merowe Airport	Terminated	
Sudan	Wad Medani	Wad Medani Airport	Terminated	
Sudan	Nyala	Nyala Airport		
Sudan	Port Sudan	Port Sudan New International Airport		
Sudan	Wadi Halfa	Wadi Halfa Airport	Terminated	
Syria	Damascus	Damascus International Airport	Terminated	
Turkey	Istanbul	Istanbul Atatürk Airport	Terminated	
Uganda	Entebbe	Entebbe International Airport	Terminated	
United Arab Emirates	Abu Dhabi	Abu Dhabi International Airport		
United Arab Emirates	Al Ain	Al Ain International Airport	Terminated	
United Arab Emirates	Dubai	Dubai International Airport	Terminated	
United Arab Emirates	Sharjah	Sharjah International Airport	Terminated	
United Kingdom	London	Gatwick Airport	Terminated	
United Kingdom	London	Heathrow Airport	Terminated	
Yemen	Aden	Aden International Airport	Terminated	
Yemen	Sanaa	Sanaa International Airport	Terminated	

== Fleet ==
=== Current ===
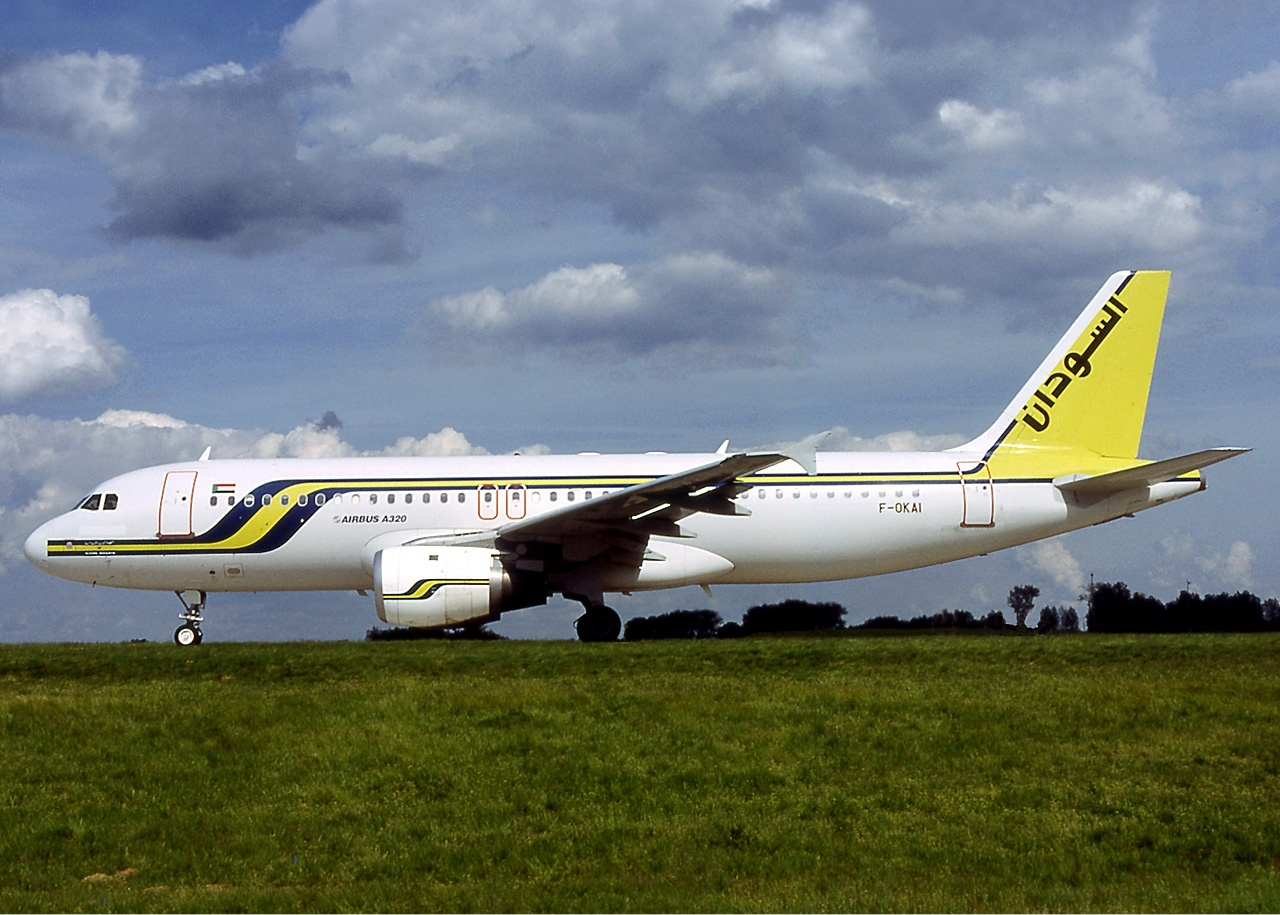
A Sudan Airways Airbus A320-211 in 1994

As of August 2025, Sudan Airways operates the following aircraft:

Sudan Airways fleet
Aircraft	In service	Orders	Passengers	Notes
Airbus A320-200	1	—	180	
Boeing 737-300	1	—	138	
Total	2	0		

=== Retired ===
Sudan Airways former fleet
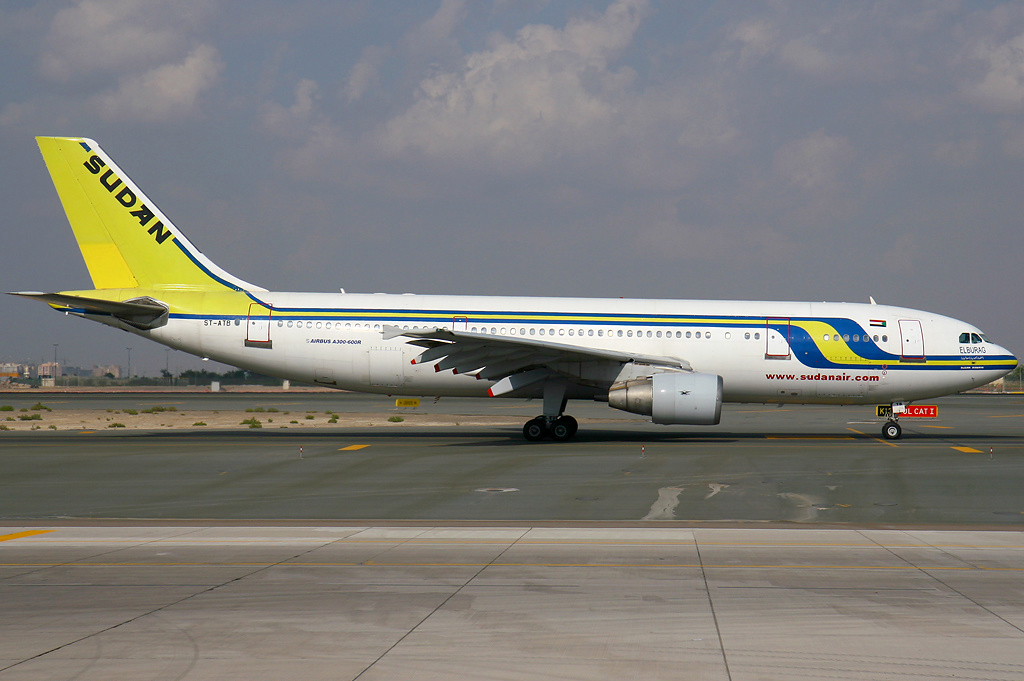
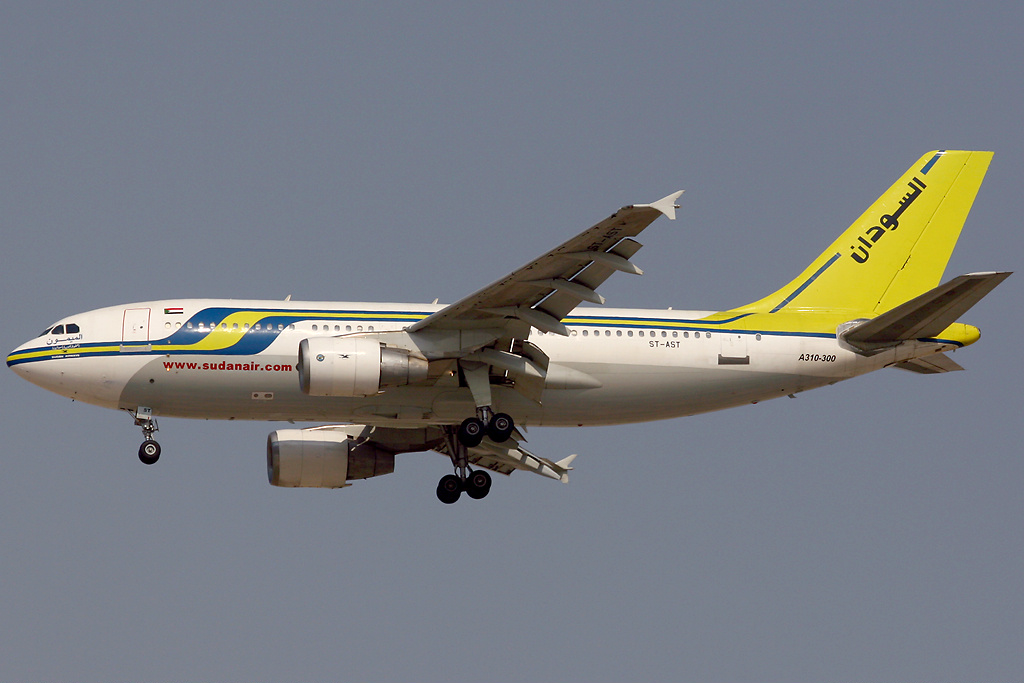
A Sudan Airways Airbus A300B4-600R (left) and Airbus A310-300 (right)

The company has flown the following aircraft throughout its history:

- Airbus A300B4-600R
- Airbus A300-600
- Airbus A300-600F
- Airbus A310-200
- Airbus A310-300
- Antonov An-24T
- Antonov An-24RV
- Antonov An-74TK
- Boeing 707-120B
- Boeing 707-320B
- Boeing 707-320C
- Boeing 720-020
- Boeing 727-200
- Boeing 737-200
- Boeing 737-200C
- Boeing 737-400
- Boeing 737-500
- Boeing 757-200
- CRJ200
- C-130H
- Comet 4C
- de Havilland Dove
- DHC-6 Twin Otter
- Douglas C-47B
- Douglas DC-8-30
- Douglas DC-8-60
- DC-9-80
- Fokker F27-200
- Fokker F27-400
- Fokker F27-500
- Fokker F27-600
- Fokker 50
- Ilyushin Il-18D
- Ilyushin Il-18V
- L-1011-1
- L-1011-500
- McDonnell Douglas DC-10-30
- Viscount 800
- Yak-42D

== Accidents and incidents ==
According to Aviation Safety Network, as of December 2011 Sudan Airways records 21 accidents/incidents, 7 of them leading to fatalities. The worst accident experienced by the company took place in July 2003 near Port Sudan, when 117 people lost their lives on an emergency landing. All events included in the list below carried with the hull-loss of the aircraft involved.

Date	Location	Aircraft	Tail number	Aircraft damage	Fatalities	Description	Refs
21 February 1967	(Sudan) Khartoum	Douglas C-47B	ST-AAM	W/O	1/2	During a training flight, lost height on approach and hit the roof of two houses and a truck before crashing. The instructor was killed.	
6 December 1971	(Sudan) Kapoeta	F27-200	ST-AAY	W/O	10/42	The aircraft was flying a domestic scheduled Khartoum–Malakal passenger service when it ran out of fuel, sinking into trees following a forced landing near Kapoeta. After the accident, the survivors were held captive by tribesmen.	
10 May 1972	(Sudan) El Obeid	F27-400M	ST-ADX	W/O	0/4	Overran the runway on landing at El Obeid Airport with a feathered propeller.	
18 March 1975	(Sudan) Dinder National Park	Twin Otter 100	ST-ADB	W/O	5/6	Crashed during an inspection flight.	
6 June 1977	(Sudan) El Fasher	F27-400M	ST-ADW	W/O	0/39	The nosewheel collapsed on takeoff from El Fasher Airport.	
10 September 1982	(Sudan) Khartoum	Boeing 707-320C	ST-AIM	W/O	0/11	The aircraft was on final approach to Khartoum Airport inbound from Jeddah, when it landed in the River Nile after the pilots mistook the moonlit waters with the adjacent runway.	
5 October 1982	(Sudan) Merowe	F27-200	ST-AAS	W/O	0/20	Resulted damaged beyond repair upon landing at Merowe Airport.	
2 July 1985	(Sudan) El Debba	F27-200	ST-AAR	W/O	0/31	Hard landing at El Debba Airport.	
16 August 1986	(Sudan) Malakal	F27-400M	ST-ADY	W/O	60/60	The airplane was on a domestic scheduled Malakal–Khartoum passenger service, when it was shot down with an SA-7 near Malakal by SPLA rebels.	
25 March 1991	(Sudan) Khartoum	F27-200	ST-AAA	W/O	0	The aircraft made a belly landing at Khartoum Airport, after it was unable to get fully airborne during take-off.	
19 July 1998	(Sudan) Khartoum	Boeing 737-200C	ST-AFL	W/O	0	Suffered a hydraulic malfunction shortly after take-off that prompted the pilots to return to the airport of departure. A tyre burst occurred upon landing. The aircraft overran the runway and came to rest in a ditch. Due to operate a scheduled domestic Khartoum–Dongola passenger service.	
11 June 2002	(Sudan) Khartoum	F27-600	ST-SSD	W/O	0/2	Tyres burst after a rejected take-off at Khartoum Airport during a training flight, making the aircraft to drift to the right. The landing gears resulted damaged when the aircraft skidded off the runway.	
8 July 2003	Port Sudan	Boeing 737-200C	ST-AFK	W/O	116/117	Due to operate a domestic scheduled Port Sudan–Khartoum service as Flight 139. Some 15 minutes after take-off, one of the engines lost power and prompted the crew to return to make an emergency landing. However, the runway was missed and the aircraft descended until it hit the ground, 5 kilometres (3.1 mi) east of Port Sudan.	
10 June 2008	(Sudan) Khartoum	A310-300	ST-ATN	W/O	30/214	The aircraft was operating an international scheduled Amman–Damascus–Khartoum passenger service as Flight 109, when it crashed and subsequently burst into flames upon landing amid stormy weather at the final destination airport, after it veered off the runway. The plane had 214 people on board; despite most of them managed to escape from the burning aircraft, the accident claimed 30 lives.	
21 October 2009	(United Arab Emirates) Sharjah	Boeing 707-320C	ST-AKW	W/O	6/6	Crashed into a desert zone 1.6 kilometres (0.99 mi) northwest of Sharjah International Airport immediately after take-off. The aircraft had been leased by Sudan Airways from Azza Transport, and was due to operate a scheduled Sharjah–Khartoum freighter service as Flight 2241.	

== See also ==
- Transport in Sudan
- List of airlines of Sudan

== Bibliography ==
- Gradidge, J.M.G. (2006). The Douglas DC-1, DC-2, DC-3 - The First Seventy Years, Volume 1. Air-Britain (Historians) Ltd. ISBN 0-85130-332-3.
- Guttery, Ben R. (1998). Encyclopedia of African Airlines. Jefferson, North Carolina: McFarland & Company, Inc. ISBN 0-7864-0495-7.
