= Flight 109 =

Flight 109 may refer to:

Listed chronologically

- Aeroflot Flight 109, crashed on 18 May 1973
- Sudan Airways Flight 109, crashed on 10 June 2008

== See also ==
- STS-109, a successful Space Shuttle mission in March 2002
