= Abbas al-Fadini =

Sudanese politician

Abbas al-Fadini is a member of the Parliament of Sudan and of the Forum of African and Arab Parliamentarians on Population and Development.

On 10 June 2008 he survived the fire of Sudan Airways Flight 109.
