= Sudan Airways Flight 139 =

2003 aviation accident

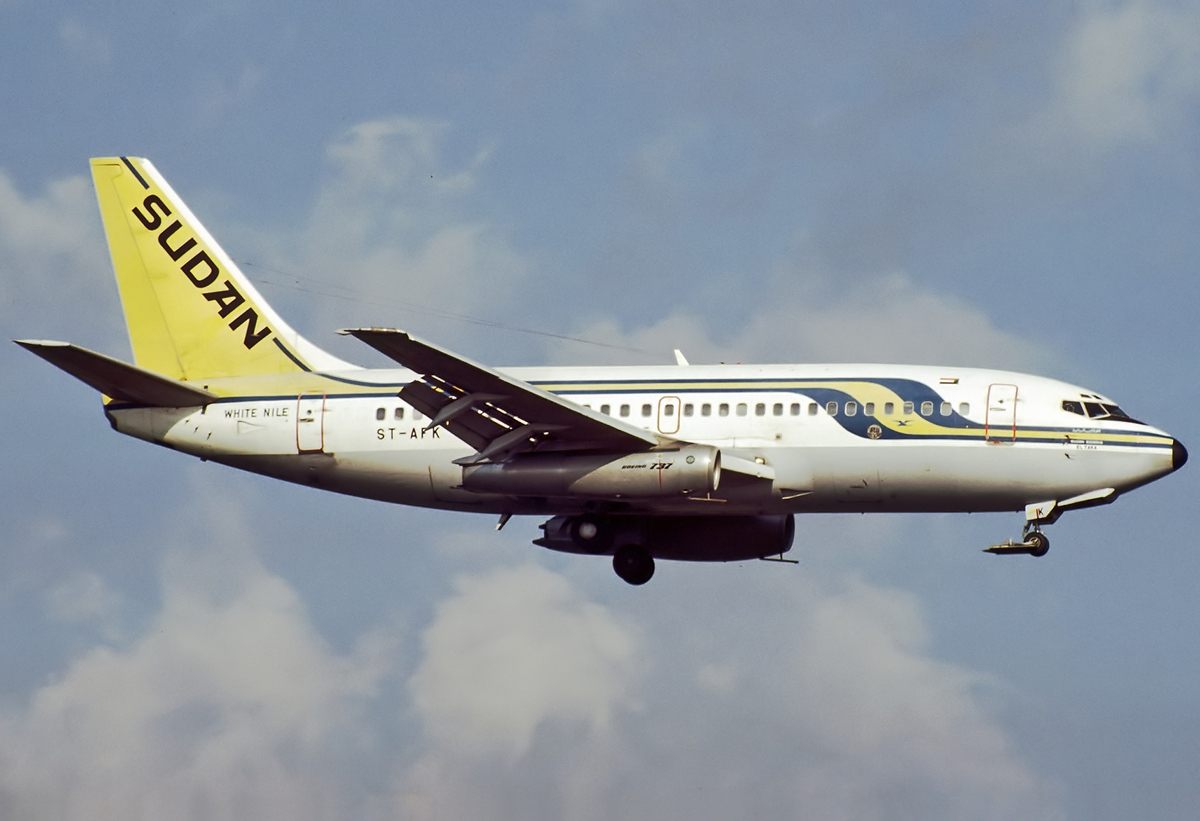
- ST-AFK, the aircraft involved in the accident, seen in 1989

Accident
- Date: 8 July 2003
- Summary: Crashed following attempted emergency landing
- Site: Port Sudan; 19°37′12″N 37°13′00″E

Aircraft
- Aircraft type: Boeing 737-200C
- Aircraft name: White Nile
- Operator: Sudan Airways
- IATA flight No.: SD139
- ICAO flight No.: SUD139
- Call sign: SUDANAIR 139
- Registration: ST-AFK
- Flight origin: Port Sudan New International Airport
- Destination: Khartoum International Airport
- Occupants: 117
- Passengers: 106
- Crew: 11
- Fatalities: 116
- Injuries: 1
- Survivors: 1

Sudan Airways Flight 139 was a Sudan Airways passenger flight that crashed on 8 July 2003 at Port Sudan. The Boeing 737-200 aircraft was operating a domestic scheduled Port Sudan–Khartoum passenger service. Some 15 minutes after takeoff, the aircraft lost power in one of its engines, which prompted the crew to return to the airport for an emergency landing. In doing so, the pilots missed the airport runway, and the airplane descended until it hit the ground, disintegrating after impact. Of the 117 people aboard, 116 of them died.

== Aircraft and crew ==
The aircraft involved in the accident was a Boeing 737-2J8C, registered ST-AFK. Powered by two Pratt & Whitney JT8D-7 engines, it was delivered new to Sudan Airways in 1975. At the time of the accident, the aircraft was almost 28 years old.

The pilots involved were Captain Awad Jaber, First Officer Amir al-Nujumi, and Second Officer Walid Khair.

== Accident ==
The airplane had departed Port Sudan at 4:00 am (UTC+3), bound for Khartoum. Captain Jaber radioed about ten minutes after take-off about a problem with one of the engines, and that he would return to the airport to make an emergency landing. However, the plane plummeted into the ground before returning to the airfield and immediately caught fire.

All but one of the 117 occupants of the aircraft— most of them Sudanese— perished in the accident. There were three Indians, a Briton, a Chinese, an Emirati, and an Ethiopian among the dead as well. A two-year-old boy was the sole survivor. This crash is the deadliest accident to occur in Sudan, to date.

== Cause ==
Then-Sudanese foreign minister Mustafa Osman Ismail raised the trade embargo imposed by the U.S. government in 1997 as a contributing factor to the accident, claiming the airline was unable to get spare parts for the maintenance of its fleet because of sanctions. The aircraft involved in the accident, in particular, had not been serviced for years. Sanctions were imposed following an executive order by President Bill Clinton, banning the export of goods and technology to Sudan, due to the country's "support for international terrorism, ongoing efforts to destabilize neighboring governments, and the prevalence of human rights violations." In response to the claims, the United States Department of State said there was no ban on parts needed for aviation safety.

Although initially attributed to a mechanical failure, it was later suggested that after one of the aircraft's engines failed on takeoff, the chief pilot handed controls to the "novice" copilot as a "learning experience."

== See also ==
- Aviation accidents and incidents
- Sudan Airways Flight 109
