= 1986 Sudan Airways Fokker F-27 shootdown =

1986 airliner shootdown

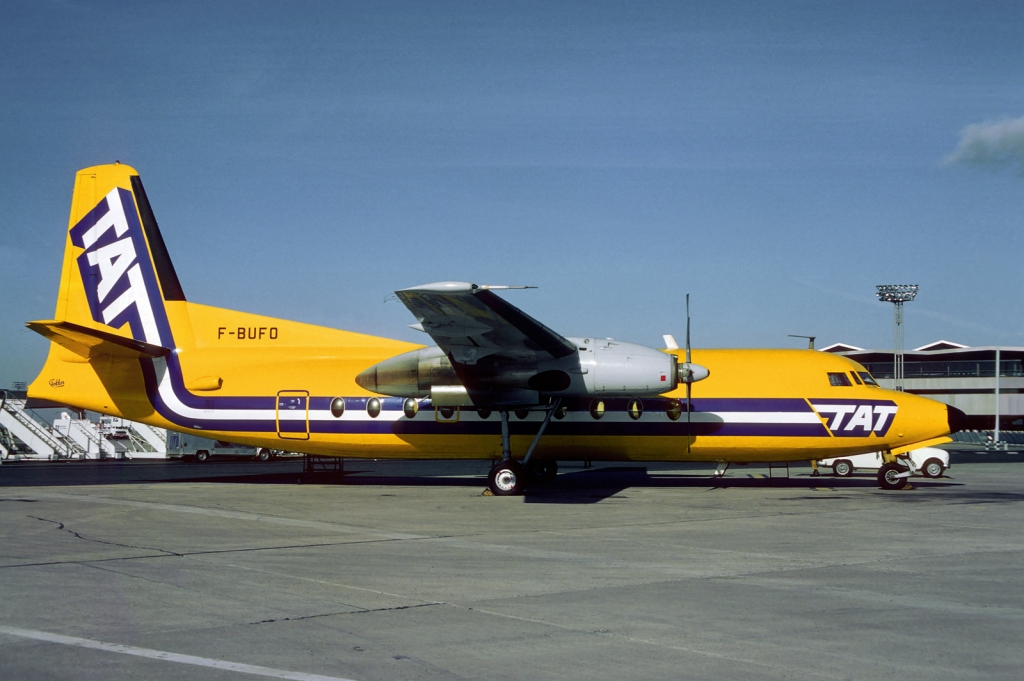
- A Fokker F-27 similar to the accident aircraft operated by TAT European Airlines

Shootdown
- Date: 16 August 1986
- Summary: Shot-down by SPLA militants
- Site: Near Malakal Airport, Malakal, South Sudan; 9°34′29.94″N 31°41′22.59″E

Aircraft
- Aircraft type: Fokker F-27 Friendship 400M
- Operator: Sudan Airways
- Registration: ST-ADY
- Flight origin: Malakal Airport (MAK/HSSM)
- Destination: Khartoum International Airport (KRT/HSSS)
- Passengers: 57
- Crew: 3
- Fatalities: 60
- Survivors: 0

On 16 August 1986 a Sudan Airways Fokker F-27 Friendship 400M was performing a scheduled domestic passenger flight from Malakal (in present South Sudan) to Khartoum in Sudan, when it was shot down by the SPLA militants. All 60 people on board the aircraft were killed. As of February 2024, the shootdown remains the deadliest incident involving a Fokker F-27 and the deadliest aviation incident in South Sudan.

== Background ==
During the Second Sudanese Civil War, on 5 August 1986, the SPLA militants announced they would shoot down all unauthorized military or civilian aircraft, claiming that the government was using them to transport soldiers and weapons. Approximately at the time of the 1986 shootdown the militants singled out one humanitarian charter company, alleging that the company had a government contract "to spy on and take aerial photographs of" rebel operations. In May 1986 the militants brought down a passenger plane, killing all 13 aboard.

The aircraft involved in the August 1986 shootdown had a serial number 10277. It made its maiden flight in 1965 and accrued a total of 25,702 airframe hours and 19,290 flight cycles.

== Shootdown ==
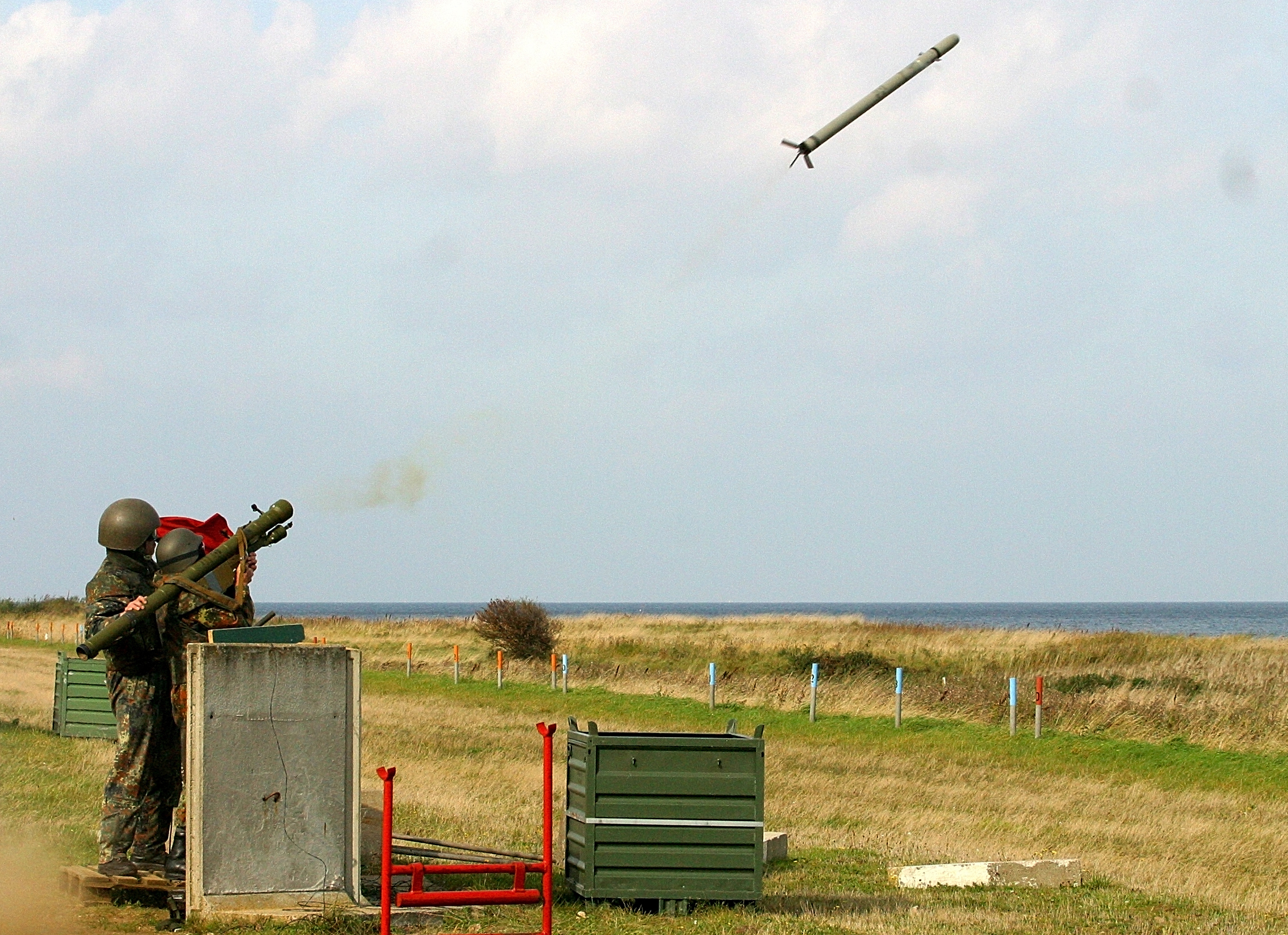
A Strela 2 missile being fired, similar to that involved in the incident

Shortly after takeoff from Malakal the aircraft was brought down by a Soviet-made Strela 2 surface-to-air missile, fired by a Shilluk contingent of the SPLA. According to contemporary press reports, the missile was captured from the Sudanese army.
