= Sudan Airways Flight 2241 =

2009 aviation accident in Sharjah, UAE

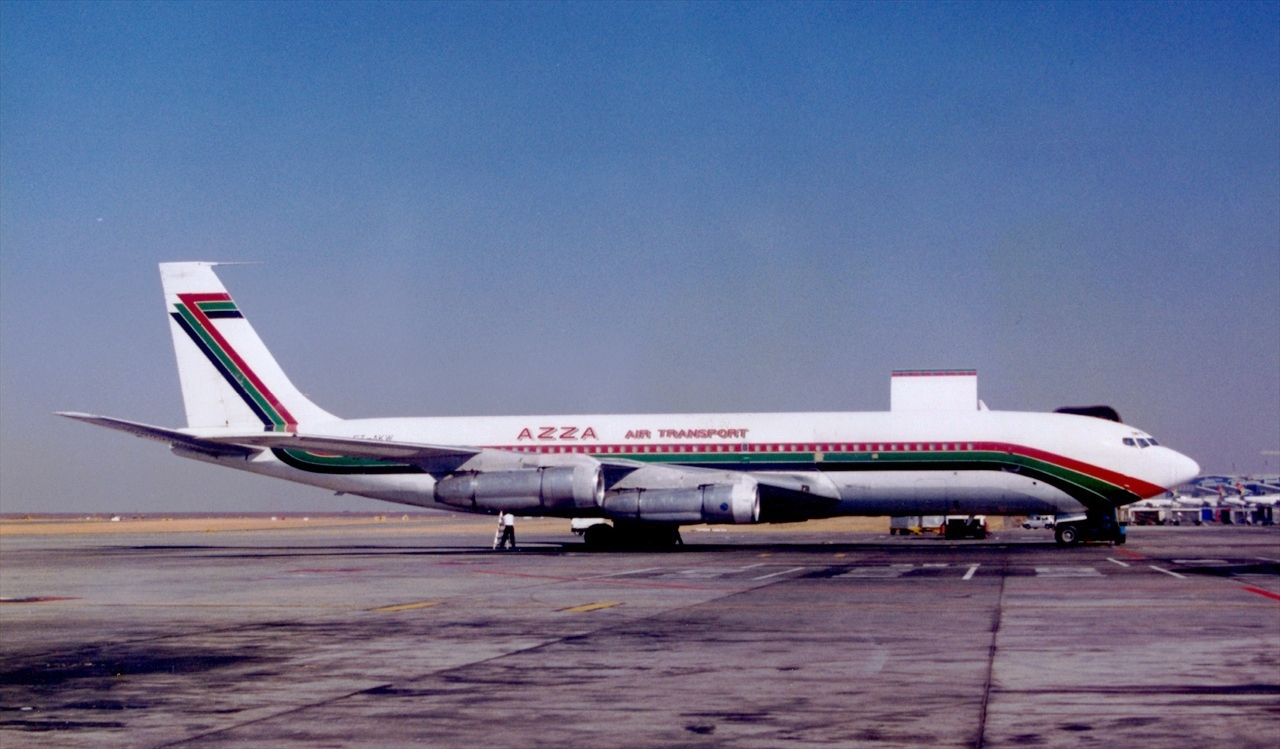
- ST-AKW, the aircraft involved, seen in 2001

Accident
- Date: 21 October 2009
- Summary: Stalled shortly after take-off due to pilot error following engine cowl separation
- Site: Near Sharjah International Airport, United Arab Emirates; 25.349931°N 55.492789°E

Aircraft
- Aircraft type: Boeing 707-330C
- Operator: Sudan Airways leased from Azza Transport
- IATA flight No.: SD2241
- ICAO flight No.: SUD2241
- Call sign: SUDANAIR 2241
- Registration: ST-AKW
- Flight origin: Sharjah International Airport, United Arab Emirates
- Destination: Khartoum International Airport, Khartoum, Sudan
- Occupants: 6
- Passengers: 3
- Crew: 3
- Fatalities: 6
- Survivors: 0

Sudan Airways Flight 2241 was a scheduled cargo flight from Sharjah, United Arab Emirates, to Khartoum, Sudan, operated by a Boeing 707. On 21 October 2009, the cargo plane's No. 4 engine cowling separated during lift off, and in an attempt to turn the plane around, it stalled and crashed north of the airport. All six occupants were killed.

== Background ==
=== Aircraft ===
The aircraft involved was Boeing 707-330C ST-AKW. The aircraft was s/n 20112, line number 788. The aircraft first flew on 1 May 1968 and was delivered to Lufthansa on 17 February 1969 where it was registered D-ABUJ. From 23 March 1977, it was leased to Condor until it was sold to the United Arab Emirates on 5 May 1981. The aircraft was re-registered A6-DPA. On 26 May 1986, the aircraft was sold to the Sudanese Government and re-registered ST-AKW. On 26 October 1986, it was sold to Nile Safaris Aviation, serving until sold to Trans Arabian Air Transport on 28 May 1992. The final change of ownership was on 16 August 1994 when it was sold to Azza Transport.

=== Crew ===
Three flight crew members, a ground engineer, and two loadmasters were aboard the flight:

The captain was 61-year-old Mohamed el-Halfawi. He had previously worked for Sudan Airways, and had 19,943 flight hours, but his experience on the Boeing 707 was not stated. 34-year-old First Officer Aladdin Moharam had 6,649 flight hours, including 5,011 hours on the Boeing 707. The flight engineer, 53-year-old Mohamed el-Fateh Mohyeddine, had 7,324 flight hours, all of which were on the Boeing 707. Also on-board were 55-year-old ground engineer Elsawi Hamed, and loadmasters Makki Abdul-Aziz & Abu-Bakr Hassan.

== Accident ==
External videos
- CCTV footage of the incident on YouTube

At 15:30 local time (11:30 UTC) on 21 October 2009, a Boeing 707-320 of Azza Transport crashed 1.6 kilometres (1 mi) from the end of runway 30 of Sharjah International Airport. The flight was destined for Khartoum International Airport and had just taken off at the time of the accident. The aircraft was carrying a cargo of air conditioning units, car parts, computers and tools. A piece of the aircraft fell off shortly after it became airborne, which was later identified as a part of a cowling from engine No. 4. The aircraft was totally destroyed in the crash and subsequent fire which killed all six crew on board.

== Investigation ==
Sheikh Khalid al-Qassimi stated that the General Civil Aviation Authority (GCAA) of the United Arab Emirates launched an investigation into the crash. It is reported that one area of inquiry is the engines. The Cockpit Voice Recorder and Flight Data Recorder were recovered and sent to the United Kingdom for analysis. In February 2010, it was reported that both recorders were not functioning, and no data was recovered from them. In January 2011, the GCAA released an interim report. An engine cowling fell away from the No. 4 engine shortly after takeoff. The final report stated the cause of the accident was the aircraft exceeding the maximum bank angle. This caused a stall and loss of control that was not recoverable. The crew were responding to a perceived power loss of engine No. 4, although their response was inappropriate. The No. 4 engine's core cowls departed from the engine, and this led to the separation of the Engine Pressure Ratio flex line.

== Consequences ==
Azza Transport was banned from operating in the United Arab Emirates while the investigation into the accident took place. It ceased operations a few months after the initiation of the investigation.
