= Al Dabbah, Sudan =

Al Dabbah الدبة
- Town
- Location in Sudan
- Coordinates: 18°03′0.85″N 30°56′58.26″E
- Country: Sudan
- Admin. division: Northern (state)

Population
  - Total: 52,000

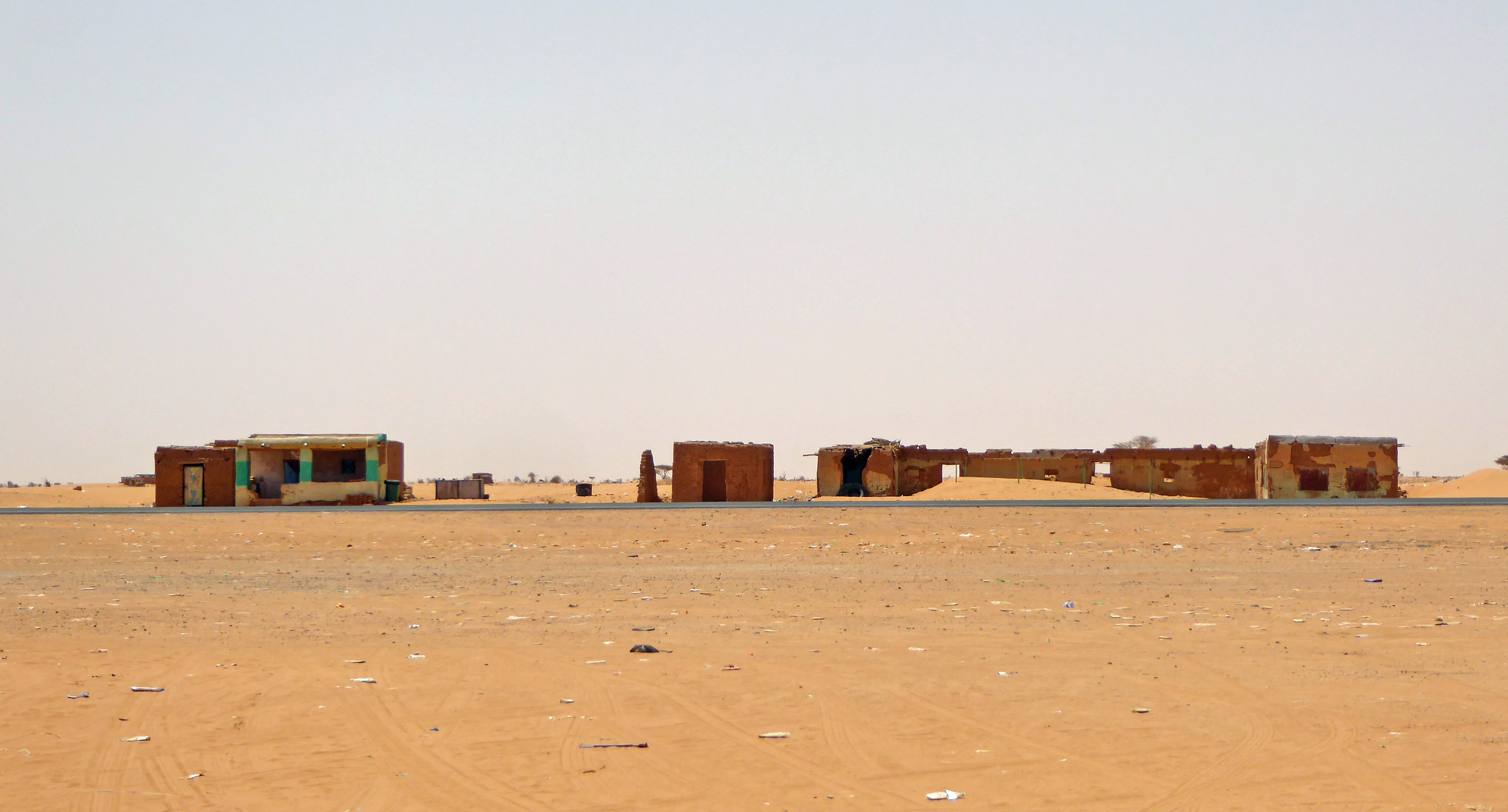

Al Dabbah (Arabic: الدبة), also known as Ed Debba, El Debba, El Debbah or Ed Debbah, is a town in Sudan on the river banks of the Nile, which is served by the Al Dabbah Airport. It has an estimated population of 52,000.

== History ==
On 7 February 2025, the Sudanese military repelled a drone attack by the RSF on the town, shooting down seven drones.
