= Kasala =

Kasala may refer to:

- Kasala (film) a 2018 Nigerian film
- Kassala the capital of the state of Kassala in eastern Sudan
- Kasala Kamanga (born 1960) Congolese basketball player
- University of Kassala a school in eastern Sudan
