= Sudan Airways Flight 109 =

2008 aviation accident

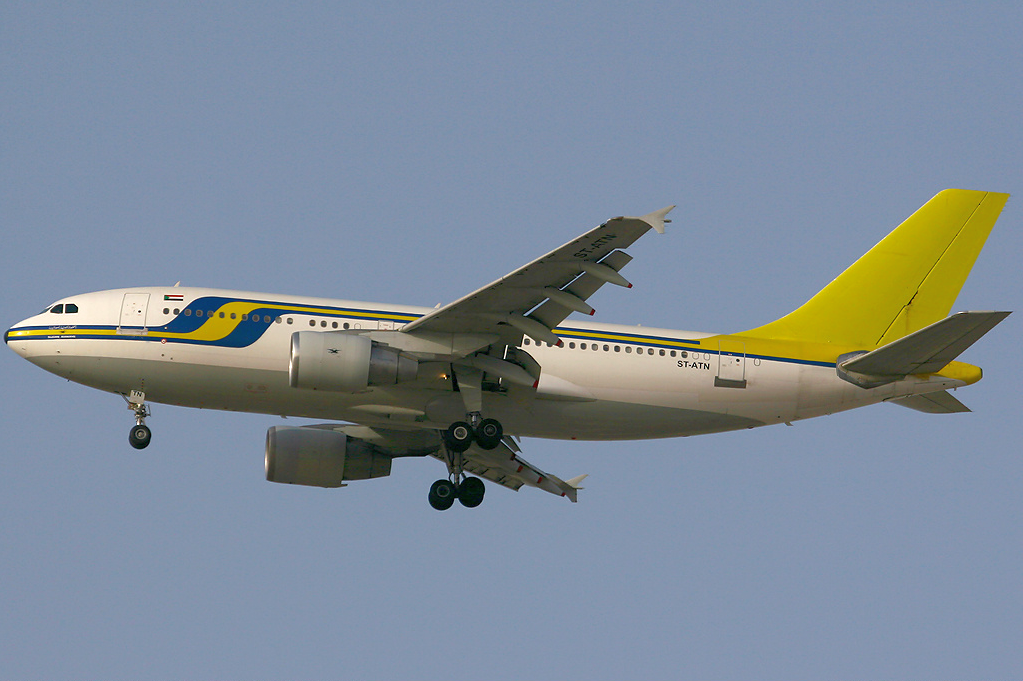
- ST-ATN, the aircraft involved in the accident seen in April 2008

Accident
- Date: 10 June 2008
- Summary: Runway overrun due to long flaring distance
- Site: Khartoum International Airport, Khartoum, Sudan; 15°36′18″N 32°33′11″E

Aircraft
- Aircraft type: Airbus A310-324
- Operator: Sudan Airways
- IATA flight No.: SD109
- ICAO flight No.: SUD109
- Call sign: SUDANAIR 109
- Registration: ST-ATN
- Flight origin: Queen Alia International Airport, Amman, Jordan
- 1st stopover: Damascus International Airport, Damascus, Syria
- Last stopover: Port Sudan New International Airport, Port Sudan, Sudan
- Destination: Khartoum International Airport, Khartoum, Sudan
- Occupants: 214
- Passengers: 203
- Crew: 11
- Fatalities: 30
- Injuries: 17
- Survivors: 184

Sudan Airways Flight 109 was a scheduled international Amman–Damascus–Khartoum passenger flight, operated with an Airbus A310 by the flag carrier of Sudan, Sudan Airways. On 10 June 2008, at approximately 17:26 UTC, the Airbus A310 crashed on landing at Khartoum International Airport, killing 30 of the 214 occupants on board.

The investigation was conducted by Sudan's Air Accident Investigation Central Directorate with assistance from the French Bureau of Enquiry and Analysis for Civil Aviation Safety (BEA). The investigation concluded that the accident was caused by the long flaring distance of the flight on a wet runway, aggravated with the non-deployment of the autobrake and one of the Airbus A310's two engine reversers. The inclement weather condition and the crew's lack of information on the weather were cited as contributing factors. Following the accident, Sudan's Air Accident Investigation Central Directorate issued several recommendations, mainly on better training and better infrastructure on the airport.

== Background ==
=== Aircraft ===
The aircraft involved in the accident was an Airbus A310-324, c/n 548, tail number ST-ATN, that had its maiden flight on 23 August 1990 as F-WWCV. Equipped with twin-PW4152 powerplants, it was delivered new to Singapore Airlines on 22 October 1990 and registered 9V-STU. Re-registered VT-EVF, it was delivered to Air India on 10 March 2001. The aircraft was finally registered ST-ATN, and was delivered to Sudan Airways on 1 December 2007. According to Airbus, it had accumulated 52,000 flight hours and 21,000 cycles.

=== Passengers and crew ===
There were 203 passengers and 11 crew members on board the aircraft, including two pilots in the flight deck:

- The captain of the flight was 60-year-old Abdulqader Saeed (عبد القادر سعيد). He had logged 14,180 flight hours, including 3,088 hours on the Airbus A310.
- The first officer was 50-year-old Ali Fazaa (علي فزع). He had logged 9,879 hours, 3,347 of them were on the Airbus A310.

== Accident ==
The flight originated in Amman, the capital of Jordan, with its final destination in Khartoum, Sudan with an intermediate stop in the Syrian capital of Damascus. The flight departed Amman with an unserviceable and inhibited No. 1 engine thrust reverser, having arrived as such from Cairo the previous day, with the outage labeled per the Minimum Equipment List (MEL).

Jordanian officials stated that the aircraft carried 34 passengers from Amman, while in Damascus it took on another 169 passengers. A sandstorm and heavy rain prevented the aircraft from landing in Khartoum, and forced the crew to divert to Port Sudan. The aircraft was later allowed to fly back to its original destination.

As the flight approached Khartoum, the flight crew were given weather details. Flight 109 received clearance from air traffic control and began to land. The flight touched down at Khartoum Airport at 17:26 UTC, but overran the runway and came to rest 215 m (705 ft) beyond the end of runway 36. A fire then erupted on the starboard side of the aircraft.

As fire started on the right side of the aircraft, slides were deployed only on the left side. The fire, which managed to get inside the cabin, was reported as intense and created thick smoke while passengers evacuated. The thick smoke and nighttime darkness hampered the evacuation process, which was further aggravated by panicked passengers, who were not briefed at all on safety procedures. Communications between crew members were ineffective and hand luggage caused further delay in the evacuation process. As the rear left slide could not be used due to the height of the aircraft, passengers had to use either the middle or the forward left slide, causing a pile-up, during which the fire quickly spread to the forward fuselage and the cockpit.

Immediate aftermath of the crash
- Associated Press video on the crash of Flight 109

The airport was immediately shut down due to the accident and rescue services were deployed to the crash site. However, the rescue operation was hampered by the shortage of search and rescue personnel, the lack of communication equipment among rescue personnel, rough surfaces around the crash site, lack of emergency exit routes and participation of civil defense fire vehicles. Multiple ambulances were mobilized to the airport to take injured passengers to hospitals across Khartoum. One bus was deployed to take surviving passengers for examination.

== Casualties ==
In the immediate aftermath of the crash, news media stated that up to 120 people might have been killed in the accident, as the head of medical services, Major General Muhammad Osman Mahjoub, reported Reuters that there were 120 bodies on the site. The number was later reduced to 100 and was later revised to 28 as officials discovered that many of the survivors had left the scene, hence mistakenly declared as dead or missing. The number of people who were declared missing reached 53, before being revised down to 14.

People on board by nationality
| Nationality | Passengers | Crew | Total |
|---|---|---|---|
| Sudan | 201 | 11 | 212 |
| Iraq | 2 | 0 | 2 |
| Total | 203 | 11 | 214 |

Additionally, news media reported that 17 people were treated for mild injuries, including the pilot of the flight. An additional 111 people reportedly survived without any injuries. The final report, however, did not specify any injuries on the passengers and the crew members.

According to the final tally, out of 203 passengers and 11 crew members on board the aircraft, 29 passengers and 1 crew member lost their lives. Many of the casualties were children with disabilities, as well as seniors returning from treatment in Amman.

A state funeral for the passengers and crew member who died on the flight was held in Khartoum on 11 June. The funeral was attended by Sudan President Omar al-Bashir and several senior state officials. The funeral ceremony was attended by more than 5,000 people.

=== Notable passengers ===
Abbas al-Fadini (Member of the Parliament of Sudan) was on board the flight and survived unscathed.

== Investigation ==
Thoughts on the causes of the crash were initially split into several theories. Most survivors stated that as the aircraft overran the runway, a fire immediately developed on the right wing of the aircraft. They also confirmed that prior to its landing that the weather was rough. Several people, including Sudan Airways, blamed bad weather as the main cause of the incident.

However, several officials also blamed "defects" on the aircraft as the cause of the accident. Director of Khartoum International Airport Youssef Ibrahim stated that the crash was caused by an explosion on the right engine. He reiterated that the aircraft had landed safely and that the pilots were talking with ATC workers when the crash happened. Several survivors also reported that an explosion had occurred on the right engine.

Other survivors also blamed the pilots for a "very rough" landing. The Civil Aviation Authority of Sudan stated that the pilots might have caused the aircraft to land hard on the runway. The rough landing might have caused "cylinders" to blow.

=== Sequence of events ===
Investigators analyzed multiple findings and made a sequence of events based on the findings. These findings include data from both flight recorders, weather data, information on the airport infrastructure and data collected from flight simulation.

Prior to Flight 109's landing, the crew had been informed on the weather condition in the airport. Khartoum Tower incorrectly reported that a headwind was present at the airport. Pilots were also informed on the precipitation in the airport. As Flight 109 got its clearance to land, the crew prepared the aircraft for landing.

Flight 109 touched down at 19:26 local time. The indicated airspeed was 140 kn (260 km/h; 160 mph), while the ground speed was 155 kn (287 km/h; 178 mph). This indicated that the aircraft was struck by a 15 kn (28 km/h; 17 mph) tailwind. The crew, however, did not realize this. Due to this, Flight 109 touched down at about 850–900 m (2,790–2,950 ft) from the runway threshold.

The runway was noted as "very slippery", causing friction coefficient to be greatly decreased. The pilot, however, decided not to deploy the autobrake, even though the controller had informed him on the slippery runway. The aircraft continued to roll on the runway. The crew then decided to deploy the thrust reverser. The deactivated left engine thrust reverser caused an asymmetrical power, as the aircraft started to veer to the right. The pilot managed to get the aircraft back to the centerline.

The captain then applied full braking on both pedals. The wheels locked and the anti-skid was turned off. Flight 109 overran the runway at a speed of 76 kn (141 km/h; 87 mph). The right wing then hit some antennae and approach lights. The aircraft had already suffered some kind of fuel leakage on the left wing and right wing. As the aircraft hit some structures on the ground, it severed the leakage. The fire then started when the aircraft came to a full stop.

=== Conclusion ===
The overrun was caused by a combination of a long landing flare, the wet runway, landing without autobrakes, and landing with the port thrust reverser deactivated. The inoperative reverser caused the plane to veer to the right when the captain activated reverse thrust in both engines. Low visibility and heavy rain and winds were also present at the time of the accident. Contributing to the long landing flare was the fact the crew had been incorrectly informed that they had a 7 kn (13 km/h; 8.1 mph) headwind for landing, when they actually had a 15 kn (28 km/h; 17 mph) tailwind.

== See also ==
- Sudan Airways Flight 139
