= Al Dabbah Airport =

Airport in Al Dabbah, Sudan

- IATA: EDB; ICAO: HSDB

Summary
- Airport type: Public
- Serves: Al Dabbah
- Elevation AMSL: 843 ft / 257 m
- Coordinates: 18°00′50″N 30°57′35″E

Map
- Location of the airport in Sudan

Runways
Direction	Length		Surface
Direction	m	ft	Surface
18/36	1,395	4,575	Graded Earth
- Source: Google Maps Width 100 ft (30.5 m), Parking apron 420 ft x 160 ft (128 m x 47.7 m)

Al Dabbah Airport (IATA: EDB, ICAO: HSDB) is an airport serving the town of Al Dabbah in Sudan.

== See also ==
- Transport in Sudan
- List of airports in Sudan
