= Azza Air Transport =

Sudanese cargo airline

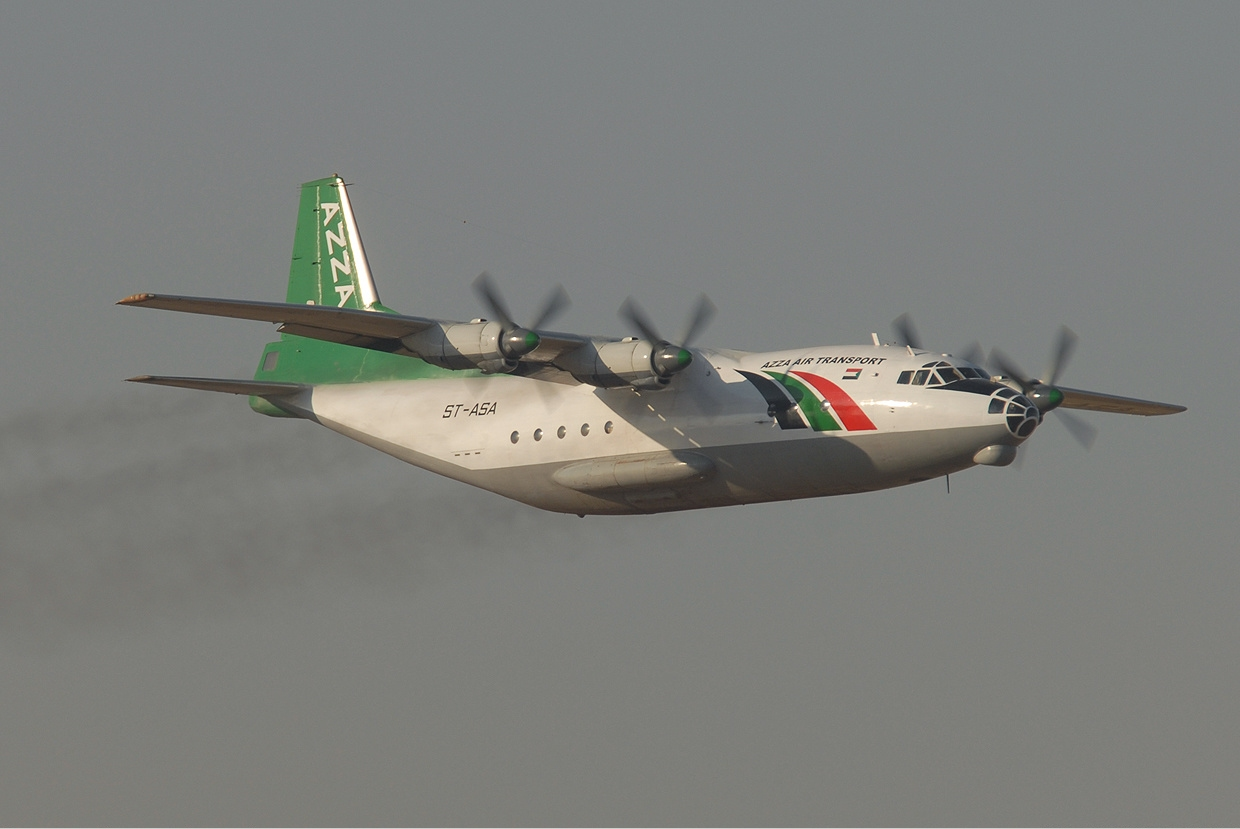
- Azza Air Transport Antonov An-12BP. This plane crashed later in 2012
IATA	ICAO	Call sign
-	AZZ	AZZA TRANSPORT
- Founded: 1993
- Ceased operations: 2013
- Fleet size: 4

Azza Transport Company (alternatively known as Azza Air Transport) was a cargo airline based in Khartoum, Sudan. It operated a cargo charter service throughout Africa and the Middle East and was planning services for Europe. Its main base was at Khartoum International Airport.

== History ==
The airline was established in 1993 and started operations in September 1993. It is owned by Omdurman National Bank, Shaikan Insurances and Sheikan Insurance. It has 350 employees. May 30, 2007, the US Department of State named as part of economic sanctions a list of Sudanese firms, including Azza Transport Company, for "transferring small arms, ammunition and artillery to Sudanese government forces and Janjaweed militia in Darfur.

In May 2009, United Nations observers observed an Azza aircraft transporting well over a hundred members of the Sudan Armed Forces and military equipment to Geneina Airport in Darfur, in violation of international sanctions.

== Accidents and incidents ==
- On October 21, 2009, Flight 2241, operated by a Boeing 707-330C, crashed on take-off at Sharjah International Airport, United Arab Emirates. The flight was operated by a Boeing 707 freighter and all six crewmembers were killed.
- On October 7, 2012, an An-12 was operating a military flight when it crashed after takeoff from Khartoum when both engines on the left wing failed.

== Fleet ==
The Azza Air Transport fleet included the following aircraft in October 2009:

- 1 Antonov An-12
- 1 Antonov An-26
- 2 Ilyushin Il-76TD
