= List of Catholic dioceses in Sudan and South Sudan =

The Catholic Church in Sudan and South Sudan is composed of

- one Latin hierarchy, united in one single episcopal conference, designated as Sudan Catholic Bishops' Conference, comprising an ecclesiastical province under a Metropolitan Archdiocese per country, with a total of 7 suffragan dioceses.
- three Eastern Catholic transnational jurisdictions, each covering both countries (the Melkite one mainly in Egypt).

There is also an Apostolic nunciature to Sudan (papal diplomatic representation, embassy-level) in national capital Khartoum (into which to nunciature to Eritrea is also vested),
and an Apostolic nunciature to South Sudan, but that last office in vested in the nunciature to Kenya (in Nairobi).

Map of Latin Catholic Dioceses in Sudan (1-2) and South Sudan (3-9) : Sudan: 1 Diocese of El Obeid 2 Archdiocese of Khartoum South Sudan: 3 Diocese of Wau 4 Diocese of Rumbek 5 Diocese of Malakal 6 Diocese of Tombura-Yambio 7 Diocese of Yei 8 Archdiocese of Juba 9 Diocese of Torit

== Current Latin dioceses ==
=== Ecclesiastical Province of Khartoum ===
covering all Sudan

- Metropolitan Archdiocese of Khartoum
  - Diocese of El Obeid

=== Ecclesiastical Province of Juba ===
covering all South Sudan

- Metropolitan Archdiocese of Juba
  - Diocese of Malakal
  - Diocese of Rumbek
  - Diocese of Tombura-Yambio
  - Diocese of Torit
  - Diocese of Wau
  - Diocese of Yei
  - Diocese of Bentiu

== Current Eastern Catholic jurisdictions ==
Three rite-specific churches have competent diocesan jurisdictions, but none is proper to either country alone :

=== Armenian Church ===
(Armenian rite in Armenian language)

- Armenian Catholic Eparchy of Iskanderiya (Alexandria), at Cairo, in and mainly for Egypt

=== Melkite (Greek) Catholic Church ===
(Byzantine Rite)

- Melkite Catholic Patriarchal territory of Egypt, Sudan and South Sudan

=== Syriac Catholic Church ===
(Antiochene rite in Syriac language)

- Syriac Catholic Patriarchal territory of Sudan and South Sudan

== Defunct jurisdictions ==
No titular see.

Only direct precursors of present sees, except for one suppressed bishopric in Sudan :

- Latin Diocese of Dongola

== See also ==
- Roman Catholicism in Sudan
- Roman Catholicism in South Sudan
- List of Catholic dioceses (structured view)

== Sources and external links ==
- GCatholic.org - data for all sections
- Eglise Soudan: The Dioceses and Ordinaries of Sudan
- Catholic-Hierarchy entry.
