= Matthew Remijio Adam Gbitiku =

South Sudanese Catholic prelate (born 1972)

The Most Reverend Matthew Remijio Adam Gbitiku
- Bishop of Wau, South Sudan
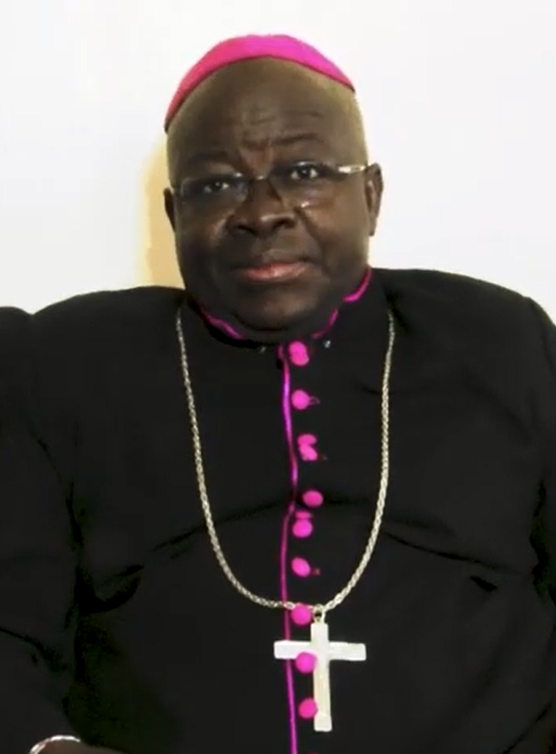
- Bishop Matthew Remijio Adam Gbitiku in 2023
- Church: Catholic Church
- Archdiocese: Roman Catholic Archdiocese of Juba
- See: Roman Catholic Diocese of Wau
- Appointed: 18 November 2020
- Installed: 24 January 2021
- Predecessor: Rudolf Deng Majak
- Successor: Incumbent

Orders
- Ordination: 3 October 2004 by Rudolf Deng Majak
- Consecration: 24 January 2021 by Cardinal Gabriel Zubeir Wako
- Rank: Bishop

Personal details
- Born: Matthew Remijio Adam Gbitiku; 5 May 1972 (age 54) Mboro, Diocese of Wau, South Sudan
- Motto: "To renew all things in Christ"

Styles of Matthew Remijio Adam Gbitiku
- Reference style: Your Lordship; The Most Reverend
- Spoken style: His Lordship
- Religious style: Bishop

Matthew Remijio Adam Gbitiku, M.C.C.I. (born 5 May 1972) is a South Sudanese Catholic prelate who is the bishop of the Roman Catholic Diocese of Wau in South Sudan, since 18 November 2020. Before that, from 3 October 2004, until he was appointed bishop, he was a priest of the religious Order of the Comboni Missionaries of the Heart of Jesus. He was appointed bishop by Pope Francis. He was consecrated bishop on 24 January 2021 at Wau, South Sudan. He is a member of the Catholic Order of the Comboni Missionaries of the Heart of Jesus.

== Background and education ==
He was born on 5 May 1972 in Mboro, Diocese of Wau in South Sudan. From 1984 until 1986, he studied at the Bussere Minor Seminary in Wau. He then transferred to a secondary school in Wengiball, where he studied from 1986 until 1989. He studied philosophy at the Saint Paul Interdiocesan Major Seminary in Khartoum, Sudan from 1995 until 1997. He completed his novitiate in Kampala, Uganda from 1997 until 1999. He obtained a Bachelor's degree in Theology from the Instituto Superior de Estudios Teológicos "Juan XXIII" (ISET) in Lima, Peru, South America. He holds a Licentiate in spiritual theology, awarded by the Pontifical Gregorian University in Rome, where he studied from 2008 until 2010. Later, he studied Canon Law at the Catholic University of Eastern Africa, in Nairobi, Kenya.

== Priest ==
He became a member of the Comboni Missionaries of the Heart of Jesus while he was at seminary. On 18 November 2003, he was ordained a deacon for that religious Order. He was ordained a priest of the same Order on 3 October 2004 at Wau by Rudolf Deng Majak, Bishop of Wau. He served as a priest until 18 November 2020. While a priest, he served in various roles and locations including as:

- Parish vicar of Masalma, in Omdurman, Khartoum from 2004 until 2008.
- Parish priest of Masalma, in Omdurman, Khartoum from 2004 until 2008.
- Spiritual director of the Legionaries of Mary of the archdiocese of Khartoum from 2004 until 2008.
- Advisor of the Rongo Group Association from 2004 until 2008.
- Studies in Rome, Italy at the Pontifical Gregorian University, leading to the award of a licentiate in spiritual theology from 2008 until 2010.
- Director of priestly vocations and member of the group of vocational animators of the Archdiocese of Khartoum from 2010 until 2012.
- Spiritual director of the Saint Paul Interdiocesan Major Seminary in Khartoum from 2012 until 2013.
- Vicar general of the archdiocese of Khartoum from 2013 until 2017.
- Vice rector and bursar of the International Theologate of Combonian Missionaries of the Heart of Jesus in Nairobi, Kenya from 2017 until 2020.

== Bishop ==
On 18 November 2020, Pope Francis appointed Reverend Father Monsignor Matthew Remijio Adam Gbitiku, M.C.C.I., previously vice rector and bursar of the International Theologate of the Comboni Missionaries of the Heart of Jesus in Nairobi, Kenya as the new bishop of the Diocese of Wau, in South Sudan.

He was consecrated bishop on 24 January 2021 outside the Saint Mary Help of Christians Cathedral, at Wau, Diocese of Wau. The Principal Consecrator was Cardinal Gabriel Zubeir Wako, Archbishop Emeritus of Khartoum assisted by Stephen Ameyu Martin Mulla, Archbishop of Juba and Michael Didi Adgum Mangoria, Archbishop of Khartoum. He continues to serve as the Local Ordinary at Wau.

== See also ==
- Catholic Church in South Sudan

== Succession table ==
Catholic Church titles
Preceded by Rudolf Deng Majak (2 November 1995 - 6 March 2017)	Bishop of Wau (since 18 November 2020)	Succeeded by Incumbent
