= Edward Hiiboro Kussala =

South Sudanese Roman Catholic prelate (born 1964)

The Most Reverend Edward Hiiboro Kussala
- Bishop of Tombura-Yambio, South Sudan
- Church: Catholic Church
- Archdiocese: Roman Catholic Archdiocese of Juba
- See: Roman Catholic Diocese of Tombura-Yambio
- Appointed: 19 April 2008
- Installed: 29 June 2008
- Predecessor: Joseph Abangite Gasi
- Successor: Incumbent

Orders
- Ordination: 20 May 1994
- Consecration: 29 June 2008 by Cardinal Gabriel Zubeir Wako

Personal details
- Born: Edward Hiiboro Kussala; 23 March 1964 (age 62) Source Yubu, Diocese of Tombura-Yambio, Western Equatoria, South Sudan
- Motto: "Surrexit Dominus Vere" (The Lord has truly risen)

Styles of Edward Hiiboro Kussala
- Reference style: His Eminence
- Spoken style: Your Eminence
- Religious style: Monsignor

Edward Hiiboro Kussala (born 23 March 1964) is a South Sudanese prelate of the Catholic Church who is the Bishop of the Roman Catholic Diocese of Tombura-Yambio, in South Sudan since 19 April 2008. Before then, from 20 May 1994 until he was appointed bishop, he was a priest of the same Catholic diocese. He was appointed bishop by Pope Benedict XVI. He was consecrated bishop on 29 June 2008.

== Early life and education ==
He was born on 23 March 1964, at Source Yubu, in the Diocese of Tombura-Yambio, Western Equatoria, South Sudan. He attended primary school in his hometown from 1974 until 1979. He studied at Saint Joseph's Minor Seminary in Rimenze from 1980 until 1982. He studied at Saint Mary's Senior Seminary, in Wau, from 1983 until 1985. In 1986, he transferred to the Saint Paul's National Seminary, where he attended the "orientation course". He studied Philosophy at an institution in Juba from 1987 until 1989. He graduated with a Diploma in Philosophy. He continued with his studies in Juba, from 1990 until 1993, graduating with a Bachelor of Arts in Theology. From 2002 until 2005, he studied at the Pontifical Alphonsian Academy in Rome, graduating with an academic degree in Moral Theology. Between 2003 and 2005, he studied at the Pontifical Lateran University, also in Rome, where he obtained a Master of Arts in International Law and advanced qualifications in Administration and Personnel Management.

== Priest ==
On 20 May 1994, he was ordained a priest in Khartoum, for the Roman Catholic Diocese of Tombura-Yambio. He served as a priest until 19 April 2008. While a priest, he served in various roles and locations including as:

- Parish vicar for the Saints Peter and Paul Parish from 1994 until 2001.
- Rector of the Minor Seminary for the Diocese of Tombura-Yambio in the CAR, from 1994 until 2001.
- Pastor of the Sudanese Refugees Camp of Mboki, Central African Republic, from 1994 until 2001.
- Bursar and head of pastoral care for the diocesan personnel in the Sudanese refugee camps of the Central African Republic from 1994 until 2001.
- Director of the secondary school for refugees of Mboki, CAR from 1994 until 2001.
- Studies at the Pontifical Alphonsian Academy in Rome, leading to the award of a degree in Moral Theology from 2002 until 2005.
- Studies at the Pontifical Lateran University leading to a Master of Arts degree in International Law and advanced qualifications in Administration and Personnel Management from 2002 until 2004.
- Studies at the Pontifical University of Saint Thomas Aquinas in Rome (bioethics) and ("Spirituality for educators") in 2014.
- Professor of moral theology at Saint Paul's National Seminary, in Khartoum from 2005 until 2008.

== Bishop ==
On 19 April 2008, Pope Benedict XVI accepted the resignation from pastoral care of the Diocese of Tombura-Yambio, in South Sudan presented by Bishop Joseph Abangite Gasi. The Holy Father appointed Reverend Father Edward Hiiboro Kussala, previously professor of moral theology at Saint Paul's Seminary in Khartoum, Sudan as the new Bishop of Tombura-Yambio in South Sudan. He was consecrated bishop on 29 Jun 2008 by Cardinal Gabriel Cardinal Zubeir Wako, Archbishop of Khartoum assisted by Paulino Lukudu Loro, Archbishop of Juba and Joseph Abangite Gasi, Bishop Emeritus of Tombura-Yambio. Between 2016 and 2019, Bishop Kussala served as president of the Sudan Catholic Bishops' Conference. As at 2024, he was still the Local Ordinary at the diocese of Tombura-Yambio.

== See also ==
- Catholic Church in South Sudan

== Succession table ==
Catholic Church titles
Preceded by Joseph Abangite Gasi (12 December 1974 - 19 April 2008)	Bishop of Tombura-Yambio (since 19 April 2018)	Succeeded by Incumbent
