= Diocese of Wau =

Latin Catholic diocese in South Sudan

Diocese of Wau Dioecesis Vavensis
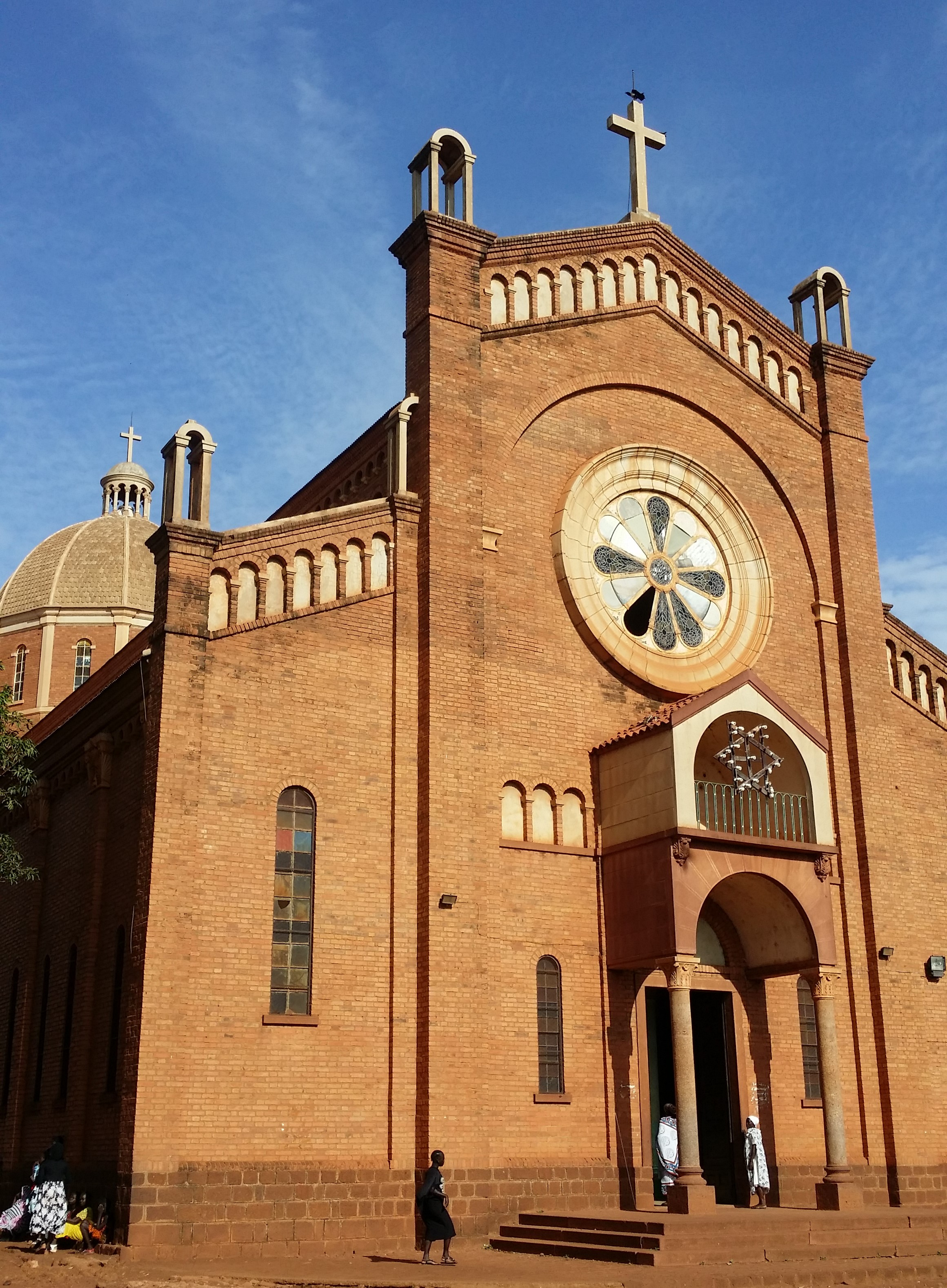
- Cathedral of St. Mary, Wau

Location
- Country: South Sudan

Statistics
- Area: 134,572 km^{2} (51,959 sq mi)
- Population: Total; Catholics: 4,667,760; 3,164,190 (67.8%)
- Parishes: 20

Information
- Denomination: Catholicism
- Sui iuris church: Latin Church
- Rite: Roman
- Established: May 30, 1913
- Archdiocese: Archdiocese of Juba
- Secular priests: 27

Current leadership
- Bishop: Matthew Remijio Adam Gbitiku, MCCJ

Map
- Location of the diocese within South Sudan

The Diocese of Wau (Latin: Vaven(sis)) is a Latin Church is an ecclesiastical jurisdiction or diocese of the Catholic Church in South Sudan. It is a suffragan in the ecclesiastical province of the metropolitan Archdiocese of Juba, and depends on the missionary Roman Congregation for the Evangelization of Peoples.

The cathedra is in the Cathedral of St. Mary in Wau, Gharb Baḩr al Ghazāl province. Matthew Remijio Adam Gbitiku has been Bishop of Wau since 18 November 2020.

== History ==
- 30 May 1913: Established as Apostolic Prefecture of Bahr el-Ghazal, on territory split off from the Apostolic Vicariate of Central Africa
- 13 June 1917: Promoted as Apostolic Vicariate of Bahr el-Ghazal
- Lost territory repeatedly : on 1923.06.12 to establish Apostolic Prefecture of Equatorial Nile, on 1949.03.03 to establish Apostolic Prefecture of Mupoi and on 1955.07.03 to establish Apostolic Vicariate of Rumbek
- 26 May 1961: Renamed after its see as Apostolic Vicariate of Wau
- 12 December 1974: Promoted as Diocese of Wau

== Statistics ==
As of 2014, it pastorally served 2,913,120 Catholics (70.0% of 4,161,600 total) on 134,572 km² in 19 parishes with 43 priests (25 diocesan, 18 religious), 1 deacon, 56 lay religious (28 brothers, 28 sisters) and 23 seminarians.

== Ordinaries ==
Apostolic Prefect of Bahr el-Ghazal

- Antonio Stoppani, Comboni Missionaries of the Heart of Jesus (M.C.C.I.) (born Italy) (1913.05.30 – 1917.06.13 see below)

Apostolic Vicars of Bahr el-Ghazal

- Antonio Stoppani, M.C.C.I. (see above 1917.06.13 – retired 1933), Titular Bishop of Stratonicea in Caria (1917.06.13 – death 1940.08.06)
- Rodolfo Orler, M.C.C.I. (born Canada) (1933.12.11 – death 1946.07.19), Titular Bishop of Prusias ad Hypium (1933.12.11 – 1946.07.19)
- Edoardo Mason, M.C.C.I. (born Italy) (1947.05.08 – 1960.05.10), Titular Bishop of Rusicade (1947.05.08 – death 1989.03.15); next Apostolic Vicar of El Obeid (Sudan) (1960.05.10 – 1969)
- Ireneus Wien Dud (first African incumbent, born Sudan) (1960.05.10 – 1961.05.26 see below), Titular Bishop of Barcusus (1955.07.03 – 1974.12.12); previously Apostolic Vicar of Rumbek (South Sudan) (1955.07.03 – 1960.05.10)

Apostolic Vicar of Wau

- Ireneus Wien Dud (see above 1961.05.26 – 1974.12.12), also President of Sudan Bishops’ Conference (1970 – 1973), Apostolic Administrator of Apostolic Vicariate of Rumbek (South Sudan) (1972 – 1974); later Metropolitan Archbishop of Juba (South Sudan) (1974.12.12 – 1982)

Suffragan Bishops of Wau

- Gabriel Zubeir Wako (1974.12.12 – 1979.10.30), also Apostolic Administrator of Apostolic Vicariate of Rumbek (South Sudan) (1974 – 1976), President of Sudan Bishops’ Conference (1978 – 1989); later Coadjutor Archbishop of Khartoum (Sudan) (1979.10.30 – 1981.10.10), succeeding as Metropolitan Archbishop of Khartoum (1981.10.10 – retired 2016.12.10), President of Sudan Bishops’ Conference (1993 – 1999 & 2012.01.01 – 2016.10), created Cardinal-Priest of S. Atanasio a Via Tiburtina (2003.10.21 [2003.12.14] – ...)
- Joseph Bilal Nyekindi (1980.10.24 – retired 1995.11.02), died 1996
- Rudolf Deng Majak (1995.11.02 – death 2017.03.08), also President of Sudan Bishops’ Conference (2006? – 2011.12.31); previously Apostolic Administrator of Wau (1992.04.12 – succession 1995.11.02).
- Matthew Remijio Adam Gbitiku, M.C.C.I. (since 18 November 2020)

== See also ==
- List of Catholic dioceses in Sudan and South Sudan

== Sources and external links ==
- GCatholic.org - data for all sections
- Diocese of Wau website
