= Alex Lodiong Sakor Eyobo =

South Sudanese Catholic prelate (born 1971)

The Most Reverend Alex Lodiong Sakor Eyobo
- Bishop of Yei, South Sudan
- Church: Catholic Church
- Archdiocese: Roman Catholic Archdiocese of Juba
- See: Roman Catholic Diocese of Yei
- Appointed: 11 February 2022
- Installed: 15 May 2022
- Predecessor: Erkolano Lodu Tombe
- Successor: Incumbent

Orders
- Ordination: 24 June 2001
- Consecration: 15 May 2022 by Cardinal Gabriel Zubeir Wako
- Rank: Bishop

Personal details
- Born: Alex Lodiong Sakor Eyobo; 26 January 1971 (age 55) Wudu, Diocese of Yei, Central Equatoria, South Sudan

Styles of Alex Lodiong Sakor Eyobo
- Reference style: Your Eminence; The Most Reverend
- Spoken style: His Eminence
- Religious style: Bishop

Alex Lodiong Sakor Eyobo (born 26 January 1971) is a South Sudanese Catholic prelate who is the bishop of the Roman Catholic Diocese of Yei in South Sudan since 11 February 2022. Before that, from 24 June 2001 until he was appointed bishop, he was a priest of the same Roman Catholic diocese. He was appointed bishop by Pope Francis. He was consecrated bishop at Yei on 15 May 2022.

== Background and education ==
He was born on 26 January 1971 in Wudu, Diocese of Yei, Central Equatoria, South Sudan. He studied at the Saint Mary Minor Seminary in Juba, from 1989 until 1993. He then studied at the Saint Paul National Major Seminary, where he studied both Philosophy and Theology, graduating with a Diploma in 1996 and a Bachelor's degree in 2000. He holds a diploma in computer science from the Catholic University of Eastern Africa, in Nairobi, Kenya, where he studied from 2002 until 2003. He holds qualifications in Financial Management and Administration awarded by CORAT Africa Training Institute, in Nairobi, Kenya, where he studied from 2006 until 2007. His Licentiate in Biblical Theology was obtained from the Pontifical Urban University in Rome, where he studied from 2014 until 2018.

== Priest ==
On 24 June 2001, he was ordained a priest for the Diocese of Yei. He served as a priest until 11 February 2022. While priest, he served in various roles and location, including as:

- Parish Vicar of the Sacred Heart, Lomin, in Kajo Keji from 2001 until 2002.
- Studies at the Catholic University of Eastern Africa, Nairobi, Kenya, leading to the award of a diploma in computer science, from 2002 until 2003.
- General Secretary of the Diocese of Yei from 2002 until 2006.
- Studies in Financial Management and Administration at CORAT Africa Institute, Nairobi, Kenya from 2006 until 2007.
- Secretary General, Diocesan General Treasurer, Coordinator of Communication and Education from 2006 until 2008.
- Diocesan Youth Chaplain from 2008 until 2013.
- Rector of the Saint Augustine Diocesan Minor Seminary in Yei from 2013 until 2014.
- Studies in Rome, Italy, leading to the award of a Licentiate in Biblical Theology from the Pontifical Urban University, from 2014 until 2018.
- Formator, Professor and Treasurer of the St. Paul National Major Seminary in Juba, from 2018 until 2022.

== Bishop ==
On 11 February 2022, Pope Francis appointed Reverend Father Alex Lodiong Sakor Eyobo, previously a priest of the Diocese of Yei, as Bishop of the same diocese. He succeeded Bishop Erkolano Lodu Tombe, whose retirement request was accepted by The Holy Father and took effect that same day. He was consecrated bishop at Yei in front of the Christ the King, Cathedral, Diocese of Yei, on 15 May 2022. The Principal Consecrator was Cardinal Gabriel Zubeir Wako, Archbishop Emeritus of Khartoum assisted by Hubertus Matheus Maria van Megen, Titular Archbishop of Novaliciana and Stephen Ameyu Martin Mulla, Archbishop of Juba. As of 2025, he was still the local ordinary in the Diocese of Yei, under precarious security conditions.

== See also ==
- Catholic Church in South Sudan

== Succession table ==
Catholic Church titles
Preceded by Erkolano Lodu Tombe (21 March 1986 - 11 February 2022)	Bishop of Yei (since 11 February 2022)	Succeeded by Incumbent
