= Holy Family Cathedral, Rumbek =

Roman Catholic church in South Sudan

Coordinates: 6.8072°N 29.6763°E

Holy Family Cathedral
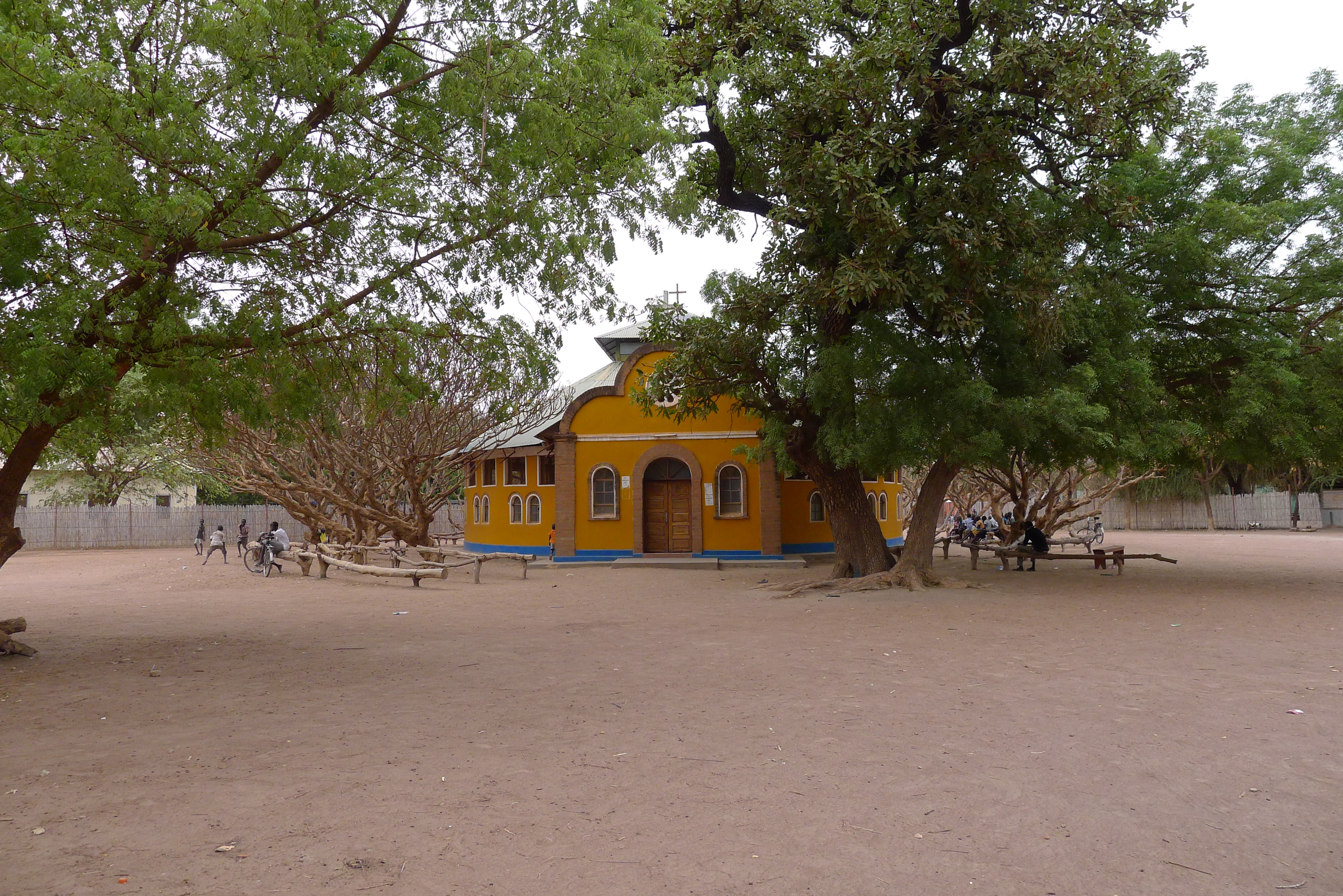
- Holy Family Cathedral
- Location: Rumbek
- Country: South Sudan
- Denomination: Roman Catholic Church

Administration
- Diocese: Rumbek

The Holy Family Cathedral or Cathedral of Rumbek, is a religious building belonging to the Roman Catholic Church is located in the town of Rumbek, capital of Lakes State, in the African country of South Sudan, and that serves as the seat of the bishop of Rumbek.

A relatively modest cathedral, it is a small building dedicated to the Holy Family, more like a chapel of a mission than a traditional cathedral in the architectural sense. It was restored by Bishop Cesare Mazzolari (1937-2011).

It was built in 1955 when the territory was still part of Anglo-Egyptian Sudan.

== See also ==
- Roman Catholicism in South Sudan
- Holy Family Church (disambiguation)
