= Equizetum =

Equizetum is a former city and bishopric in Roman North Africa which only remains a Latin Catholic titular see.

Its presumed location is Ouled-Agla (colonial French name Lacourbe) in present Algeria.

== History ==
It was among the cities of sufficient importance in the Roman province of Mauretania Sitifensis (in the papal sway) to become a suffragan diocese, but was to fade, plausibly at the seventh century advent of Islam.

Two of its bishops are historically documented:

- The schismatic Donatist Victor attended the Council of Carthage in 411, where the prevailing Catholic bishops declared his sect heretical.
- Pacatus, participant in the Council of Carthage called in 484 by Arian king Huneric of the Vandal Kingdom, after which he was exiled like most catholic bishops.

== Titular see ==
The diocese was nominally restored in 1933 as Latin titular bishopric of Equizetum (Latin) / Equizeto (Curiate Italian) / Equizeten(sis) (Latin adjective).

It has had the following incumbents, so far of the fitting Episcopal (lowest) rank:

- Michael Rodrigues (1964.03.15 – death 1964.10.12) as emeritus; formerly Bishop of Belgaum (India) (1953.09.19 – retired 1964.03.15)
- Juan Tarsicio Senner, Friars Minor (O.F.M.) (born Austria) (1965.08.19 – resigned 1976.01.23) as emeritus, died 1985; formerly Titular Bishop of Rusadus (1942.02.25 – 1951.10.26) first as Apostolic Vicar of Chiquitos (Bolivia) (1942.02.25 – 1949) and then as Auxiliary Bishop of Archdiocese of Sucre (Bolivia) (1949 – 1951.10.26), next Bishop of Cochabamba (Bolivia) (1951.10.26 – retired 1965.08.19)
- Ronald Gerard Connors, Redemptorists (C.SS.R.) (1976.04.24 – 1977.07.20) as Coadjutor Bishop of San Juan de la Maguana (Dominican Republic) (1976.04.24 – 1977.07.20); next succeeded as Bishop of San Juan de la Maguana (1977.07.20 – retired 1991.02.20), died 2002
- José Vittorio Tommasí (1984.11.19 – 1991.08.28) as Auxiliary Bishop of Archdiocese of Bahía Blanca (Argentina) (1984.11.19 – 1991.08.28); next Bishop of Nueve de Julio (Argentina) (1991.08.28 – death 1998.09.16)
- Juan Bautista Herrada Armijo, Mercedarians (O. de M.) (1991.11.30 – death 2002.01.21) first as Apostolic Administrator of Territorial Prelature of Calama (Chile) (1976.02.26 – 1982.03.05), then as Bishop-Prelate of Calama (1982.03.05 – 1991.11.30), finally as Auxiliary Bishop of Archdiocese of Antofagasta (Chile) (1991.11.30 – 1997.07.16)
- Antonio Nova Rocha (2002.02.15 – 2010.11.13) as Auxiliary Bishop of Archdiocese of Barranquilla (Colombia) (2002.02.15 – 2010.11.13) and Apostolic Administrator of Barranquilla (2010.08 – 2010.11.13); later Bishop of Facatativá (Colombia) (2010.11.13 – death 2013.04.09)
- Santo Loku Pio Doggale (2010.11.27 – ) (born Sudan) as Auxiliary Bishop of Archdiocese of Juba (South Sudan) (2010.11.27 – ).

== See also ==
- List of Catholic dioceses in Algeria

== Sources and external links ==
- GCatholic ^{[self-published]}

Bibliography

- Pius Bonifacius Gams, Series episcoporum Ecclesiae Catholicae, Leipzig 1931, p. 465
- Stefano Antonio Morcelli, Africa christiana, Volume I, Brescia 1816, pp. 155–156
- H. Jaubert, Anciens évêchés et ruines chrétiennes de la Numidie et de la Sitifienne, in Recueil des Notices et Mémoires de la Société archéologique de Constantine, vol. 46, 1913, pp. 116–117
