= Stjepan Mlakić =

Stjepan Mlakić F.S.C.J.
- Prefect of Bahr el-Gebel
- Church: Catholic Church
- See: Apostolic Prefecture of Bahr el-Gebel
- In office: 21 October 1938 – 21 October 1950
- Predecessor: Giuseppe Zambonardi
- Successor: Sisto Mazzoldi

Personal details
- Born: 1 November 1884 Fojnica, Condominium of Bosnia and Herzegovina, Austria-Hungary
- Died: 26 January 1951 (aged 66) Cairo, Kingdom of Egypt, British Empire

Stjepan Mlakić (1884-1951) was a Bosnian Croat born in Fojnica who was a missionary in Africa among the tribes of Shilluks and Nuers in Sudan, and, like his colleague Bernardo Kohnen, one of the most important representatives of Croatian Africanists.

Besides his native Croatian he spoke German, Italian, English and Arabic, to which he added the language of Nilot tribe of Nuers. His letters to his brother (also a priest) in Bosnia witness about his very close contacts with Africans. It is worth to note his discovery that in Egypt, near the town of Korsko, there is the village of Ibrim, where used to live Bosnian Muslims inhabited there by an Ottoman sultan. He donated a rich collection of artifacts of African culture to the Zagreb Ethnographic Museum.

He served as prefect of the Apostolic Prefecture of Bahr el-Gebel in Sudan from October 21, 1938, until his death.
