= St. Theresa Cathedral, Juba =

Coordinates: 4.8273°N 31.6003°E

St. Theresa Cathedral
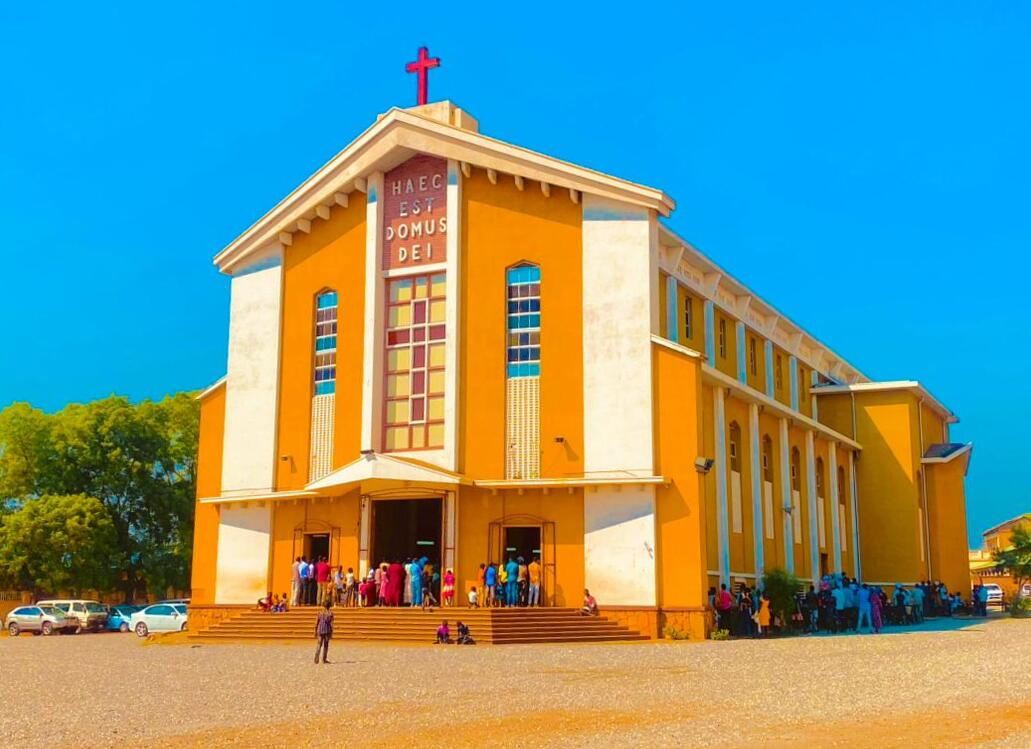
- St. Theresa Cathedral
- Location: Juba
- Country: South Sudan
- Denomination: Roman Catholic Church

Administration
- Archdiocese: Roman Catholic Archdiocese of Juba

St Theresa’s Cathedral is a parish of the Roman Catholic Church and the cathedral of the Metropolitan Archdiocese of Juba in South Sudan. The cathedral church is located on Unity Avenue in Bahr al Jabal (Central Equatoria) in the district of Kator in the city of Juba.

Construction of the church began in 1952. It was designated the cathedral upon the erection of the Archdiocese of Juba (Latin: Archidioecesis Iubaensis) on December 12, 1974 by Pope Paul VI with the bull Cum in Sudania.

During the civil war in southern Sudan, about 5,000 people took refuge in the cathedral, which was kept shut for days by violent clashes between rival factions of the national army.

== See also ==
- Catholic Church in South Sudan
