= Christian Carlassare =

Italian Catholic prelate (born 1977)

His Excellency Christian Carlassare M.C.C.I.
- Bishop of Malakal
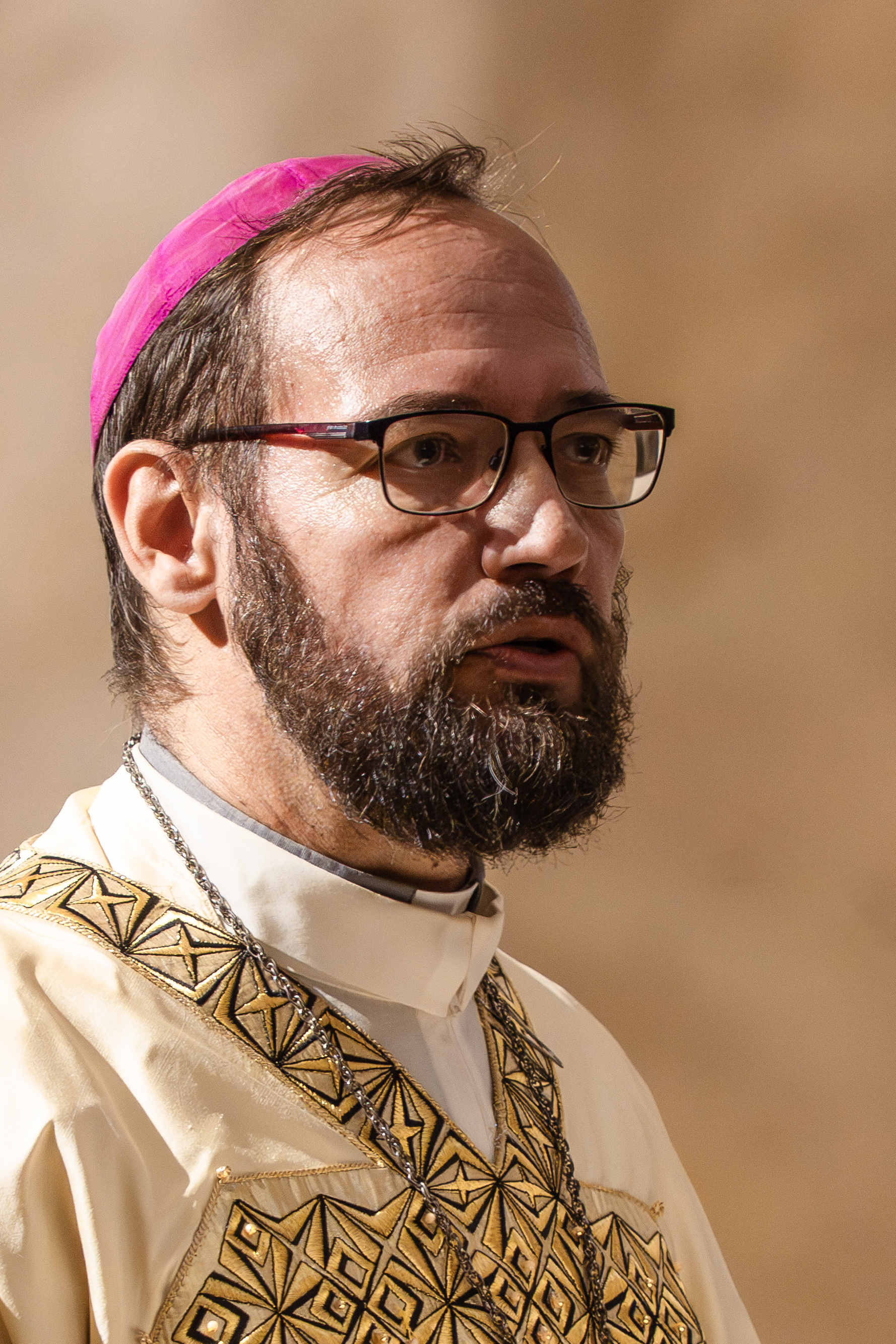
- Church: Roman Catholic Church
- Diocese: Roman Catholic Diocese of Rumbek
- In office: 8 March 2021
- Predecessor: Cesare Mazzolari
- Previous post: Vicar general of Malakal

Orders
- Ordination: 4 September 2004 by Flavio Roberto Carraro
- Consecration: 25 March 2022 by Gabriel Zubeir Wako

Personal details
- Born: 1 October 1977 (age 49) Schio, Province of Vicenza, Italy
- Education: Pontifical Gregorian University; Pontifical Urban University
- Motto: Omnes unum in Christo
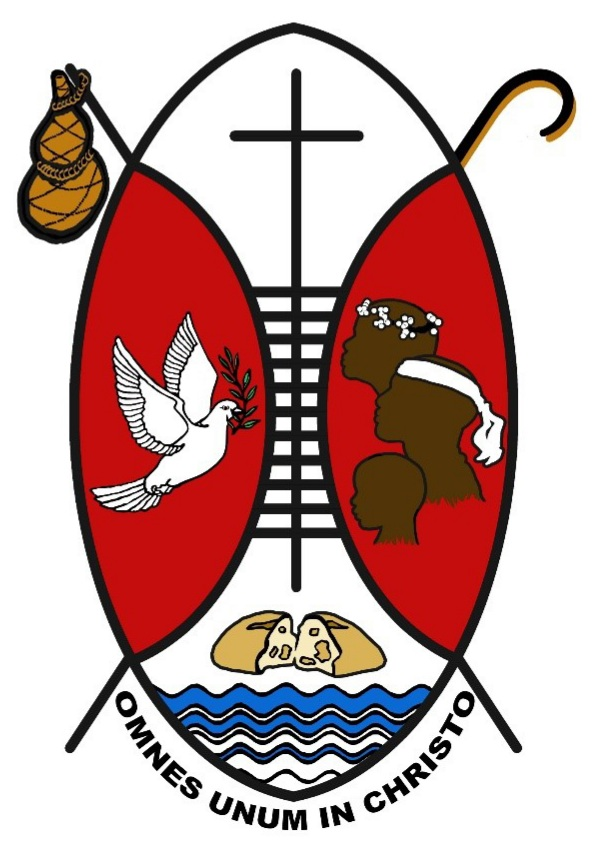
- Coat of arms

Styles of Christian Carlassare
- Reference style: The Most Reverend
- Spoken style: Your Excellency
- Religious style: Monsignor
- Posthumous style: none

Christian Carlassare, MCCJ (born 1 October 1977) is an Italian prelate of the Catholic Church who became bishop of the Diocese of Rumbek in South Sudan in March 2021. His episcopal consecration and installation were delayed for a year after he was injured in an assault. He is a member of the Comboni Missionaries and has worked in South Sudan since 2005.

When he became a bishop in 2022 at the age of 44, he was the youngest Italian bishop.

== Early life ==
Christian Carlassare was born on 1 October 1977 in Schio, Vicenza, Italy. After primary and secondary school, he attended an orientation course at the Comboni Missionary Seminary in Thiene. He carried out his postulancy and philosophical studies at the Theological Faculty of Central Italy in Florence and his novitiate in Venegono Superiore, Varese. He earned a bachelor's degree in theology at the Pontifical Gregorian University (2000-2003) and a bachelor's degree in missiology from the Pontifical Urban University (2003-2004). He made his solemn vows as a member of the Comboni Missionaries in Rome in 2003 and was ordained a priest on 4 September 2004.

== Missionary ==
After ordination, he attended an English language course during the academic year 2004/2005 and the next year studied the Nuer language in South Sudan at the Holy Trinity Parish, Old Fangak County. He held the following positions: vicar (2006-2007) and parish priest of the same parish in Jonglei State (2007-2016); member of the Secretariat of Animation of Vocations and Basic Formation (2011-2019); provincial councillor of the Comboni Missionaries, South Sudan (2012-2019); secretary of the Provincial Council of the Comboni Missionaries (2014-2016); vice provincial in South Sudan (2017-2019); and promoter of vocations and director of the orientation course (pre-Postulancy) for the Comboni Missionaries in Moroyok (Juba) (2017-2020). He was vicar general of the Diocese of Malakal from 2020 to 2021.

In an interview with Aid to the Church in Need, Carlassare spoke of the difficulties of evangelisation in South Sudan, saying that though the majority of the population is Christian, "we live in a country where Christianity is often no more than skin deep, it hasn’t grown roots in the life of the population."

== Bishop ==
On 8 March 2021, Pope Francis named him bishop of Rumbek. At the time of his appointment, he was the youngest Italian Catholic bishop. He arrived in Rumbek on 16 April with his episcopal consecration scheduled for 23 May.

Carlassare was shot at by unknown assailants on 26 April 2021. In the night individuals knocked on Carlassare's door, and when he answered they beat him and shot him four times in the legs. He was taken to the hospital in Juba. He was airlifted to Nairobi the next day and returned to Italy when released from Nairobi Hospital.

Speaking of the attack, Carlassare said: "This was a great shock for me. I had been in many dangerous situations in South Sudan, but I had never felt endangered, because I was protected by the people. But that day I was faced with two young men who were pointing guns at me, during the night, and with nowhere to run to. They shot me, but thankfully the Lord guided the bullets and I wasn’t hurt too badly. They hit the muscles in my legs but missed any vital areas. This was a moment of grace, because it gave me the humility to be like the people, bearing the same wounds as the people. I interpret this as a sign to get back on my feet and show them that they too can get back on their feet, despite the wounds caused by an endless conflict, despite the presence of so many weapons, so many territories occupied by militias and displaced people. When faced with this despair we have to provide hope that their wounds can be healed, that we can get back on our feet and walk along the path of peace."

On 14 March 2022, he met privately with Pope Francis. He received his episcopal consecration from Cardinal Gabriel Zubeir Wako, Archbishop emeritus of Khartoum, on 25 March 2022 in Holy Family Cathedral in Rumbek.

== Notes ==
Catholic Church titles
Preceded by Cesare Mazzolari M.C.C.I.	Bishop of Rumbek; 8 March 2021–current	Incumbent
