= Joseph Abangite Gasi =

South Sudanese Roman Catholic bishop

- Bishop of Tombura-Yambio
- Church: Catholic Church
- Diocese: Diocese of Tombura-Yambio
- In office: 12 December 1974 – 19 April 2008
- Predecessor: Domenico Ferrara
- Successor: Edward Hiiboro Kussala

Orders
- Ordination: 21 December 1957
- Consecration: 6 April 1975 by Agnelo Rossi

Personal details
- Born: 1 January 1928 Mupoi (southeast of Tumbura), Anglo-Egyptian Sudan, British Empire
- Died: 12 September 2014 (aged 86)

Joseph Abangite Gasi (1 January 1928 – 12 September 2014) was a Roman Catholic bishop.

Ordained to the priesthood in 1957, Gasi was named bishop of the Roman Catholic Diocese of Tombura-Yambio, South Sudan and retired in 2008.
