= Cesare Mazzolari =

Roman Catholic bishop in South Sudan

Most Reverend Cesare Mazzolari M.C.C.I.
- Bishop of Rumbek
- Church: Roman Catholic Church
- Diocese: Roman Catholic Diocese of Rumbek
- See: Rumbekl
- Appointed: November 5, 1998
- In office: July 16, 2011
- Predecessor: Gabriel Dwatuka Wagi
- Successor: Christian Carlassare M.C.C.I.
- Previous post: Apostolic administrator at Diocese of Rumbek

Orders
- Ordination: March 17, 1962
- Consecration: January 6, 1999 by pope John Paul II

Personal details
- Born: 6 February 1937 Brescia, Italy
- Died: 16 July 2011 (aged 74) Rumbek, South Sudan
- Denomination: Roman Catholic Church
- Residence: Rumbek, South Sudan
- Occupation: bishop
- Profession: priest

Styles of Cesare Mazzolari
- Reference style: The Most Reverend
- Spoken style: Your Excellency
- Religious style: Monsignor
- Posthumous style: none

Cesare (or Caesar) Mazzolari (9 February 1937 – 16 July 2011) was the Roman Catholic Bishop of the Roman Catholic Diocese of Rumbek, in the newly independent Republic of South Sudan.

== Biography ==
Bishop Mazzolari was born Feb. 9, 1937 in Brescia, Italy. He joined the Comboni Missionaries of the Heart of Jesus, and on 17 March 1962 was ordained a priest in San Diego, US. His mission brought him to Cincinnati, in the United States, where he worked among African American and Mexican American miners.

He rebuilt the Diocese of Rumbek, after the two Southern Sudanese Secession Wars (1955–1973 and 1983–2005) had devastated the country and the Government of Khartoum had expelled all foreign missionaries from the country in the 1960s.

He died a week later, on 16 July 2011, at the age of 74, while concelebrating a Mass.

== Notes ==
Catholic Church titles
Preceded by Gabriel Dwatuka Wagi	Bishop of Rumbek; 5 November 1998–16 July 2011	Succeeded by Christian Carlassare M.C.C.I.
