= Diocese of Rumbek =

Roman Catholic diocese in South Sudan

Coordinates: 6°48′N 29°41′E

The Roman Catholic Dioceses in Sudan. Number 4 is Rumbek.

The Roman Catholic Diocese of Rumbek (Latin: Rumbekensis) is a diocese in Rumbek in the ecclesiastical province of Juba in South Sudan.

== Geography ==
The Diocese of Rumbek is located in the heart of the Republic of South Sudan. Today, it covers the whole territory of Lakes State and the southern part of Warrap State – a territory or around 65.000 km2 (larger than Switzerland). Its population can be estimated to 1.5 million people, although reliable statistics are not available.

In this moment, the Diocese of Rumbek has only 11 established missions or parishes, with a number of sub-parishes and around 150 chapels and prayer stations. The Missions are

Map of the Missions of the Catholic Diocese of Rumbek / South Sudan

- Rumbek Holy Family Cathedral Parish (with Sacred Heart Rumbek and Pacong as sub-parishes)
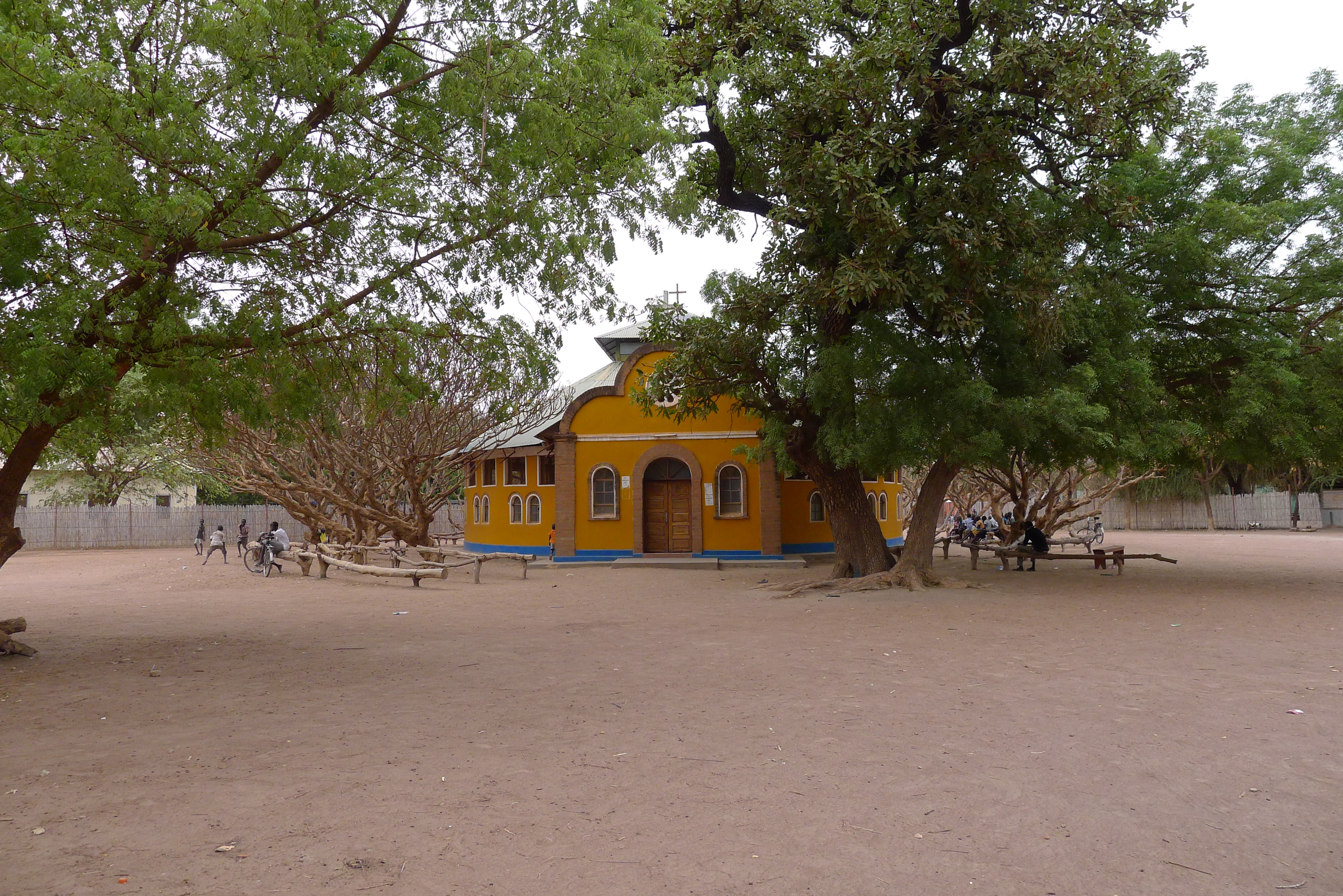
  Rumbek Holy Family Cathedral Parish (April 2013)
- Rumbek Sacred Heart Parish
- Rumbek St. Theresa Parish
- Marial Lou, St. Daniel Comboni parish (with Romic sub-parish)
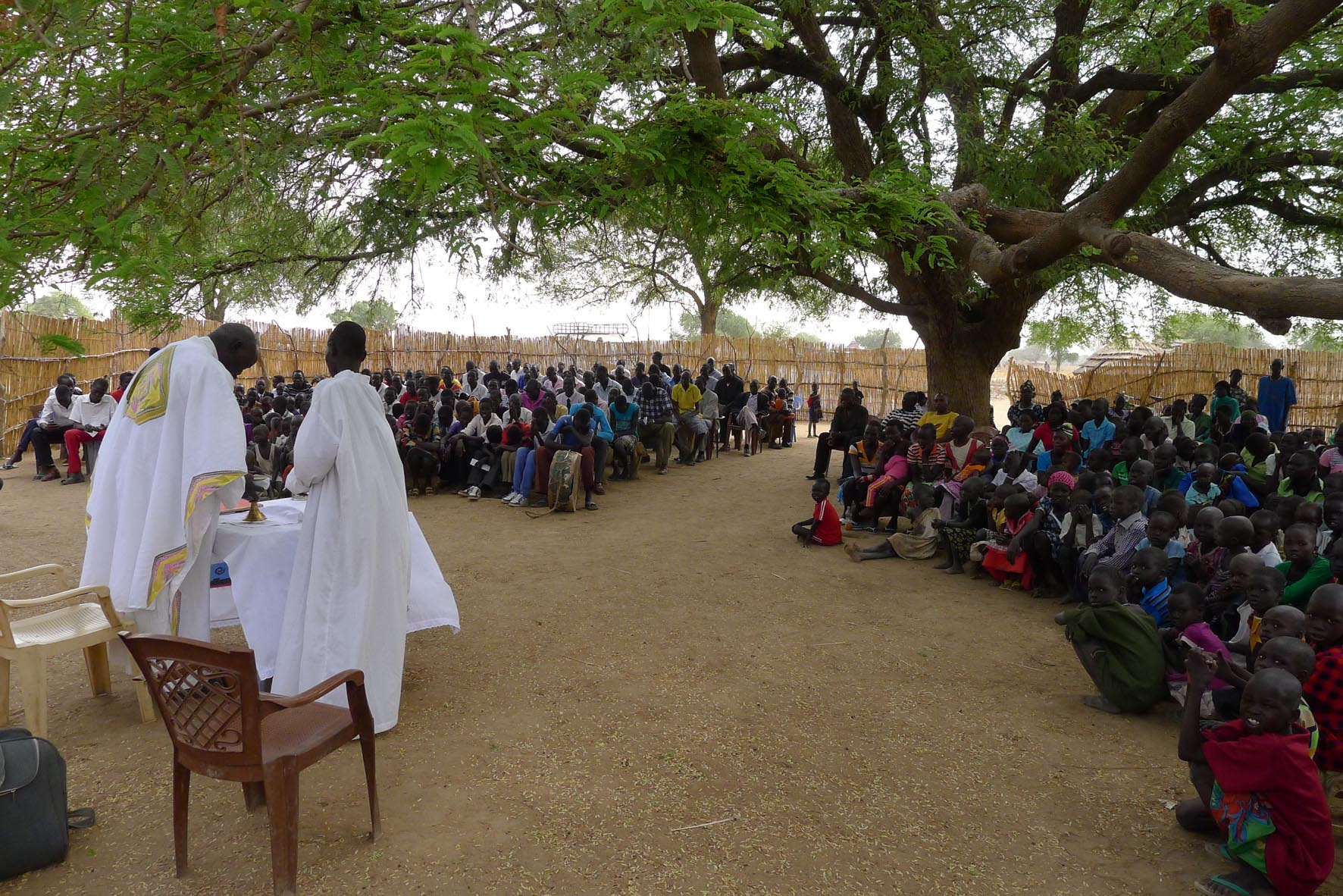
  Romic Catholic Subparish - Sunday Mass under a tree (Warrap State, South Sudan)
- Warrap, St. Daniel Comboni Parish
- Tonj, Don Bosco Parish
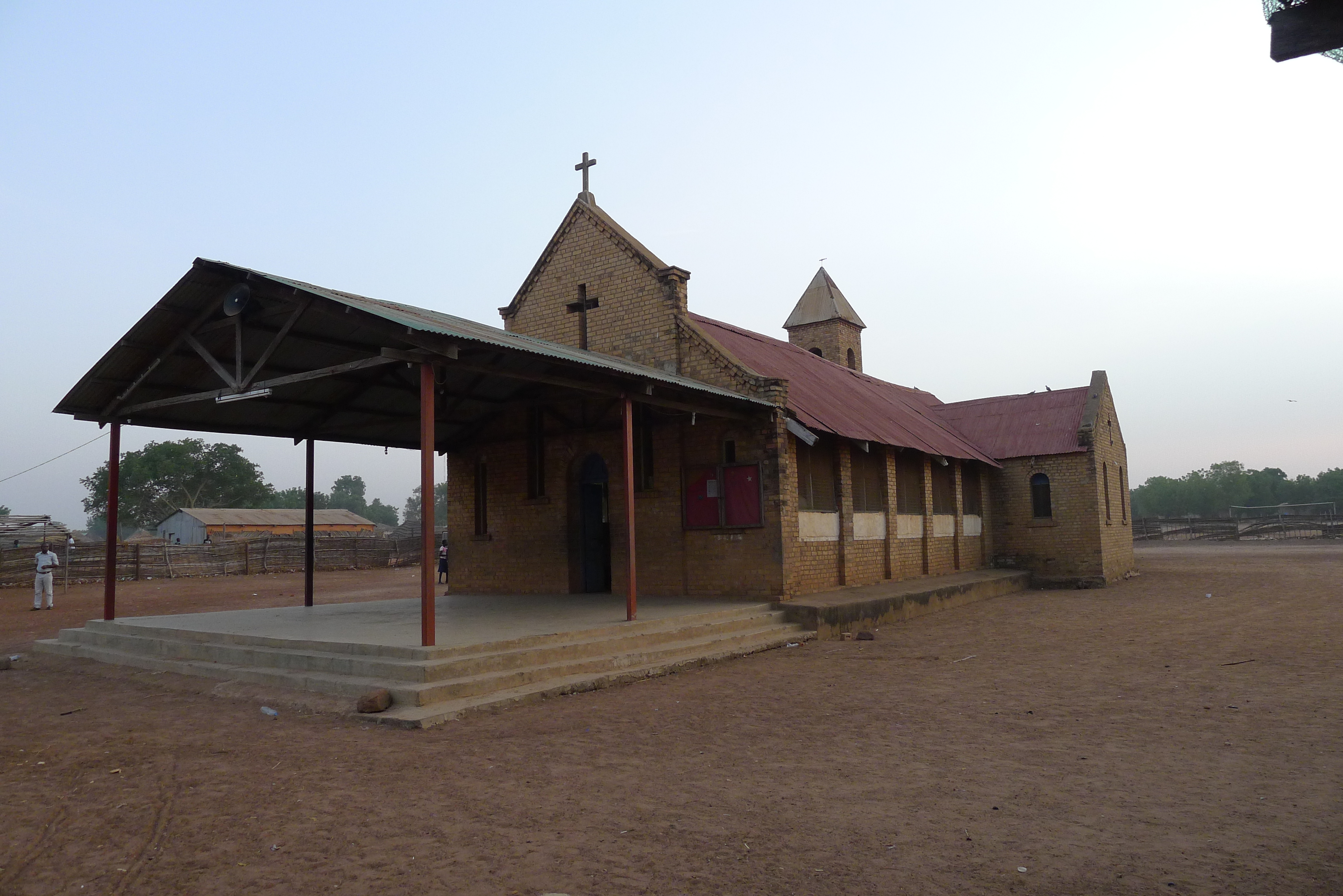
  Tonj, Don Bosco Mission - Parish Church built in the 1950s (Warrap State, South Sudan)
- Agangrial, Mary Mother of God Parish (with Cuiebet and Barghel sub-parishes)
- Wulu, St. Peter and Paul Parish
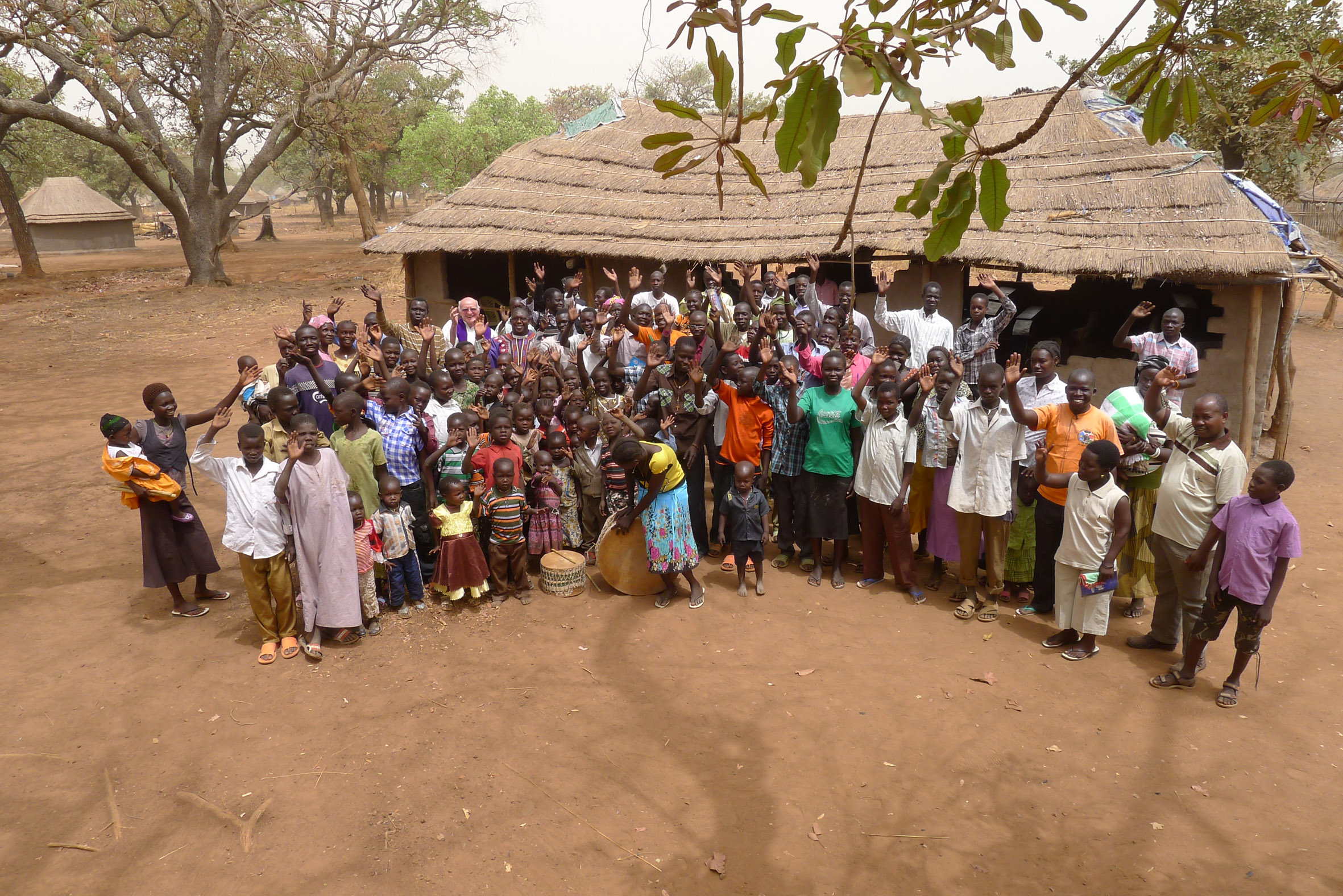
  Christians after Sunday Mass in front of the church of Wulu Catholic Mission (Lakes State, South Sudan)
- Mapuordit, St. Josephine Bakhita Parish
- Yirol, Holy Cross Parish
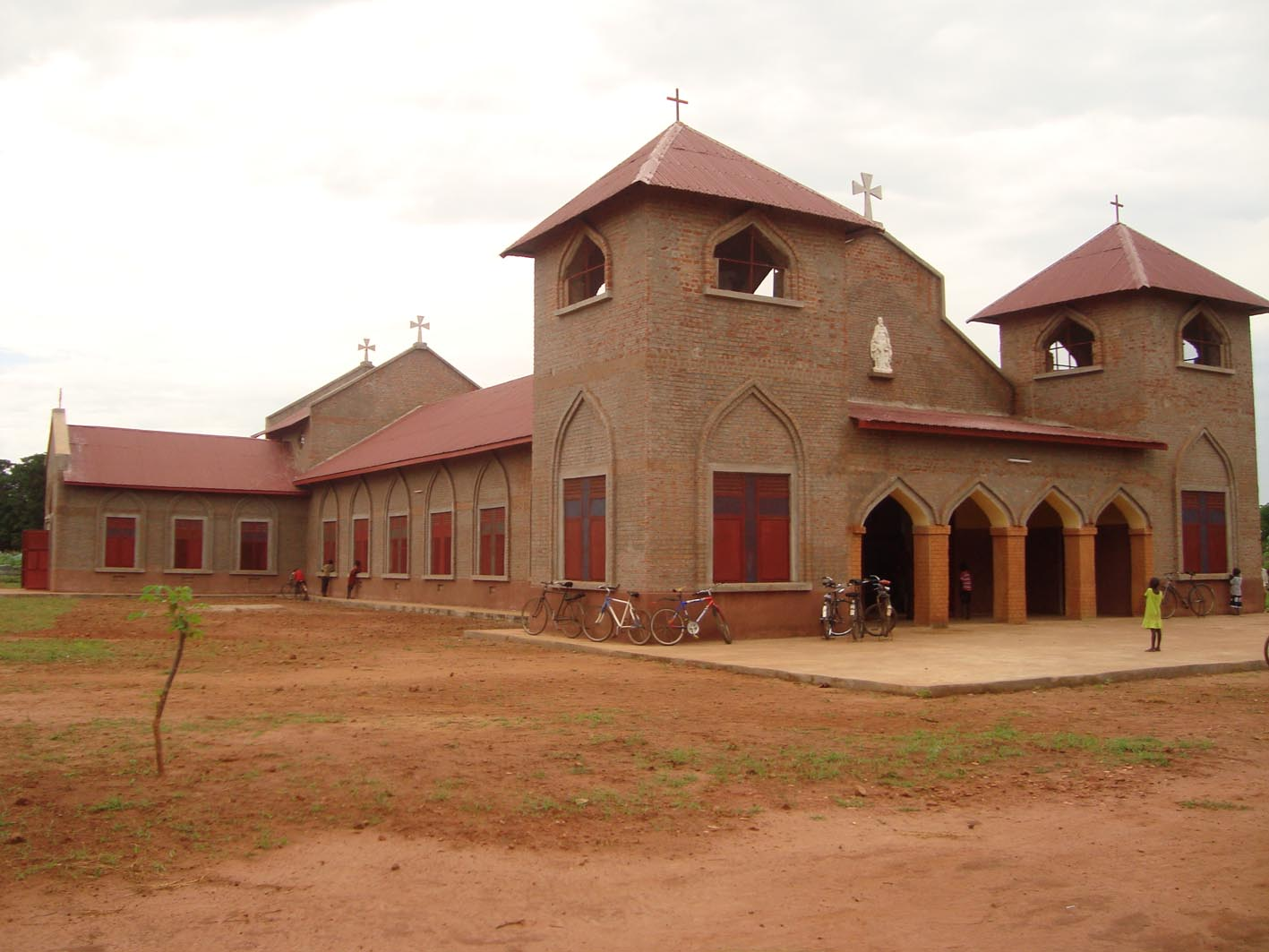
  Holy Cross Catholic Church Yirol (Lakes State - South Sudan)
- Bunangok/Aliap, St. Anselm Parish

== History ==
Catholic mission in the area of today’s Diocese of Rumbek go back to the "Apostle of Africa", Saint Daniele Comboni, himself. In 1857-58 he lived in the mission station Holy Cross at Shambe, on the western bank of the river Nile from where the catholic mission among the black Africans of Eastern-Central Africa started.

But since then historical events and political decisions hampered most of the missionary activities in the area: Soon after the death of Bishop Comboni - during the so-called "Mahdi Revolution" (1881 - 1899) against the Egyptian occupation - Christian missionaries were expelled from the territory of today’s Sudan and South Sudan. Then, gradually the British Colonialists gained control over the area and ruled the Sudan until 1956. They gave preference to Anglican missionaries but distributed the country into catholic and Protestant areas. Almost the whole territory of today’s Diocese of Rumbek was allocated to the Anglicans.

Documents report a catholic mission in the town of Thiet in 1949, Rumbek in 1951 and Tonj in 1953, all by that time under the Apostolic Vicariate of Bahr al-Ghazal (Wau).

The Apostolic Vicariate of Rumbek was established by Pope Pius XII on 3 July 1955 including a territory much larger than today’s Diocese of Rumbek. Ireneo Wien Dud, a Southern Sudanese, was ordained a bishop and appointed Apostolic Vicar of Rumbek.

But the history of the Church remained very troublesome and confusing, so that regular evangelization work was almost impossible. Less than a year after the establishment of the Vicariate of Rumbek, in 1956, the power in the Sudan shifted from the British Colonialists to some Arabic tribes who governed the Sudan from Khartoum. The Southern Sudanese never accepted the new masters, and a freedom struggle begun that would last practically half a century: From 1955-1972 the so-called "Anyanya"-rebels led the fight. After a short period of relative peace and autonomy of the South, the Sudan People’s Liberation Army (SPLA) took up the arms in 1983 until it forced the government of Khartoum to the "Comprehensive Peace Agreement" (CPA) only in 2005.

In 1960, Rumbek’s Apostolic Vicar Ireneo Wien Dud was transferred to Wau, while Rumbek Vicariate was entrusted Msgr. Lino Toboi (1960-1972).

In March 1964, all foreign missionaries were expelled from Sudan by the Military Government of General Abboud. They all fled to the neighboring countries to Uganda, Zaire and Central Africa. They left the Church to very few local clergy and catechists.

The persecution continued even after Abboud was overthrown in October 1964. Exemplary is the killing of the Vicar General, Fr. Archangelo Ali, in July 1965 during a raid of Arab soldiers in Rumbek parish. After his death also the last priests left, inclusive the Apostolic Administrator Lino Toboi who escaped to Zaire but remained officially in charge until 1972. The Church in Rumbek was abandoned for decades. During the following period, a few pastoral activities in the area (Rumbek, Tonj, Yirol, etc.) were followed by the Apostolic Vicarate of Wau.

Although in 1972 the Addis-Ababa-Peace Agreement ended 17 years of civil war, many Catholic priests did not come back to Rumbek Diocese. From 1974 to 1981, there was only one priest in the territory of the Diocese of Rumbek: Fr. Raphael Riel.

The Vicariate was elevated to the status of a diocese on 12 December 1974, with the Apostolic Vicar of Wau, Bishop Ireneo Wien Dud as Apostolic Administrator (until 1975) and Bishop Gabriel Zubeir Wako, Bishop of Wau, as caretaker (1975-1976).

The first Bishop of Rumbek was Gabriel Dwatuka, appointed on 24 January 1976. In the same year, the missions of Tonj, Thiet and Warrap were shifted to Rumbek Diocese, because of political boundaries. He resigned in 1981 or 1982. The leadership of the Diocese was entrusted to the Archbishop emeritus of Khartoum, Agostino Baroni MCCJ, who was Apostolic Administrator of Rumbek from 1981-1983 – the year when the second South Sudanese Liberation war started (1983-2005).

Baroni was succeeded by Giuseppe Pellerino MCCJ as Apostolic Administrator for Rumbek from 1983-1990. In 1986 Pellerino was held in captivity for 112 days. As soon as he was freed, he returned to serve his people in the area, mainly in Tonj, until 1990, in spite of the many difficulties and military disruption. Also in 1986 the local Clergy (only two Priests at that time) fled from the civil war, taking refuge with many youths in Ethiopia. In 1992 they returned to Sudan, but not to the region of Rumbek, which was then occupied by the government of Khartoum.

Caesar Mazzolari became Apostolic Administrator in 1991 and was consecrated Bishop in January 1999. Under his leadership, the Diocese of Rumbek was rebuilt practically from scratch to the present shape. The first important step was to reactivate the diocesan presence in the so-called "Liberated Area" – the territories of Southern Sudan conquered by the Sudan People’s Liberation Army (SPLA). This was possible by July 1991, and the region of Yirol was the first to be served but had soon to be abandoned again due to the war activities. However, Rumbek was still under the occupation of the forces of Khartoum and practically inaccessible for the Bishop, who directed the Diocesan activities from other towns of Southern Sudan or Nairobi and through – often highly risky - trips into the territory whenever possible.

In the following years Missions were built up far away from the main roads "in the bush" where the people fled to from the atrocities of the war: Mapuordit (1993), Marial Lou (1994), Agangrial (1995).

Notwithstanding the scarcity of personnel, the Diocese continued to serve the Lakes province and large areas of the Diocese of Wau and the Nuba Mountains. The Diocese developed 12 centers, only 4 of which remained operative; the others had to be abandoned one by one, because of war activities.

In May 1997, Rumbek township, was re-conquered by the SPLA forces and the Bishop could take possession again of the Episcopal town. The whole of Rumbek had been razed to the ground.

Since around 1997, the Diocese of Rumbek assumed also the pastoral care of the "liberated areas" in the Diocese of Wau, since its Bishop was impeded from reaching this territory. With the large missions of Nyamlell and Gordhim in this area, the Diocese of Rumbek served an area covering 80,000 km2 and an estimated population of around 3,800,000 until July 2010, when these missions were handed back to Wau Diocese.

Tonj and Yirol Missions were re-opened in 1999, Warrap reopened in 2003, in the same year when Wulu and Aliap/Bunagok Mission were founded. 2005, the missions of the Jesuits in Rumbek became parish. Bishop Mazzolari led the Diocese until his death on July 16, 2011, only one week after the Republic of South Sudan had obtained independence (July 9, 2011).

The leadership of the Diocese of Rumbek was then entrusted to Fr. Fernando Colombo MCCJ as Diocesan Administrator, until Italian missionary Christian Carlassare was named bishop in 2021. Carlassare had a tumultuous start to his ministry, having suffered an attack in his home on the night of 25 to 26 April, which resulted in a long period of hospitalisation, before returning to take charge of the diocese.

== Bishops ==
Vicars Apostolic of Rumbek

- Ireneus Wien Dud (1955.07.03 – 1960.05.10)

Bishops of Rumbek

- Gabriel Dwatuka Wagi (1976.01.24 – 1982.07.17)
- Cesare Mazzolari, MCCI (1998.11.05 - 2011.07.16)
- Christian Carlassare, MCCI (2021.03.08 - present)

=== Other priest of this diocese who became bishop ===
- Rudolf Deng Majak, appointed Apostolic Administrator of Wau in 1992 (became bishop after appointment as bishop there in 1995)

== See also ==
- Roman Catholicism in South Sudan

== Sources ==
- Diocese of Rumbek Official Website
- GCatholic.org
- Historical information derives from the booklet "Gold in the Crucible. History of 50 Golden Years Diocese of Rumbek 1955 – 2005", collated by H.L. Bishop Caesar Mazzolari, Fr. Fernando Colombo with Peter Kioni and Lucia Amuyira, Kenya, 2005.
