= Catarina Zenab =

Dinka Christian missionary from southern Sudan

- Caterina Zenab
- Born: 1848; Dinka village, South Sudan
- Died: 1921 (aged 72–73)
- Citizenship: Sudanese
- Occupations: Catholic missionary and evangelist
- Known for: One of the first Dinka Catholic evangelists and early companions of Daniel Comboni

Catarina, sometimes Caterina, Zenab (1848–1921) was a Sudanese Catholic missionary.

== Early life and education ==
A member of the Dinka people, born in a Dinka village, Zenab studied at the Holy Cross Mission before traveling with Daniele Comboni to Khartoum in 1860. Fluent in Dinka and Arabic, she assisted the missionaries in developing a dictionary and grammar of the Dinka language. She traveled to Verona to study before returning to Khartoum in 1873 to teach in the mission schools.

== Career ==
Zenab spent her entire career as a missionary in Khartoum, Cairo, and Omdurman, evangelizing among the Dinka, many of whom were enslaved in those cities. She has been called "perhaps the first Christian Dinka evangelist".
