= Rudolf Deng Majak =

Sudanese Roman Catholic bishop

Rudolf Deng Majak (November 1, 1940 – March 6, 2017) was a Roman Catholic bishop.

Majak was born in Awac, Sudan, in 1940. In 1970 he was ordained in Rumbek to the priesthood. In 1992 he became the Apostolic Administrator of Wau, now in South Sudan. Deng Majak served as Bishop of that diocese from 1995 until his death.
