= Diocese of Tombura-Yambio =

Roman Catholic diocese in South Sudan

Diocese of Tombura-Yambio Dioecesis Tomburaënsis-Yambioensis

Location
- Country: South Sudan

Statistics
- Area: 81,562 km^{2} (31,491 sq mi)
- Population: Total; Catholics: 2,117,450; 1,342,900 (63.4%)
- Parishes: 22

Information
- Denomination: Catholicism
- Sui iuris church: Latin Church
- Rite: Roman
- Established: March 3, 1949
- Archdiocese: Archdiocese of Juba
- Secular priests: 41

Current leadership
- Bishop: Edward Hiiboro Kussala

Map
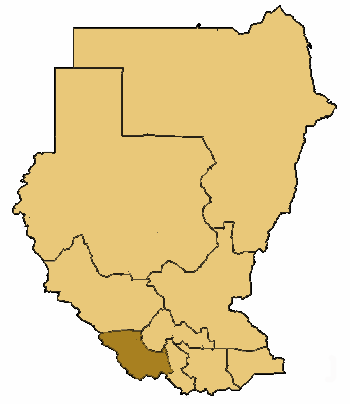
- Location of the diocese within Sudan and South Sudan

The Roman Catholic Diocese of Tombura-Yambio (Latin: Tomburaën(sis)–Yambioën(sis)) is a diocese located in the cities of Tombura and Yambio (Yambio County) in the ecclesiastical province of Juba in South Sudan.

== History ==
- March 3, 1949: Established as Apostolic Prefecture of Mupoi from Apostolic Prefecture of Bahr el-Gebel and Apostolic Vicariate of Bahr el-Ghazal
- December 12, 1974: Promoted as Diocese of Tombura
- February 21, 1986: Renamed as Diocese of Tombura–Yambio

== Leadership ==
- Prefect Apostolic of Mupoi (Roman rite)
  - Bishop Domenico Ferrara, M.C.C.I. (1949.03.11 – 1973.04.18)
- Bishop of Tombura (Roman rite)
  - Bishop Joseph Abangite Gasi (1974.12.12 – 1986.02.21 see below)
- Bishops of Tombura-Yambio (Roman rite)
  - Bishop Joseph Abangite Gasi (see above 1986.02.21 - 2008.04.19)
  - Bishop Edward Hiiboro Kussala (since 19 April 2008)

== Parishes and Churches ==
- Cathedral of Christ the King Yambio – The mother church of the diocese
- Ezo Parish
- Holy Cross Parish, Nzara
- St. Mary's Church, Tombura
- Nzara Parish
- Mupoi Parish
- Ave Maria Parish, Ngboko
- Our Lady of Fatima Catholic Parish, Maridi
- Assumption of Our Lady Catholic Parish, Rimenze

== See also ==
- Roman Catholicism in South Sudan

== Sources ==
- GCatholic.org
- Diocese of Tombura-Yambio website
