= Santo Loku Pio Doggale =

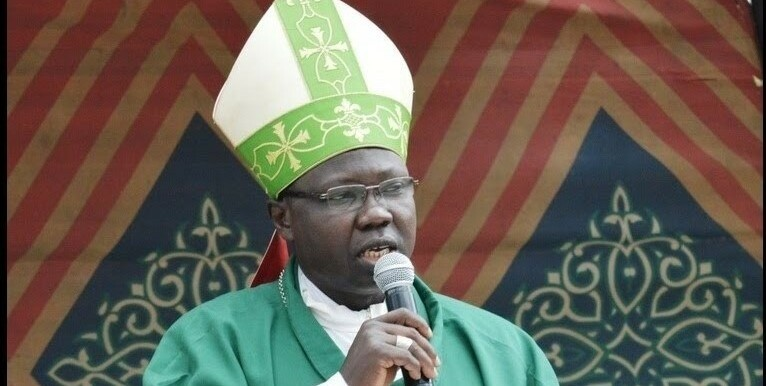
Bishop

Santo Loku Pio Doggale was born 28 December 1969 in Katiré, in the diocese of Torit. He is the auxiliary bishop of Juba, south Sudan.

== Biography ==
Santo Loku Pio attended his primary school in Kworijic before joining Minor Seminary of Saint Mary in Juba and then attended St Mary's Secondary School, receiving the Sudan Certificate. He was ordained Priest of Juba on 7 Jan. 2001 and served for 17 years and was consecrated as bishop on 20 Feb. 2011. He was appointed auxiliary bishop of Juba and titular bishop of Equizetum on 27 Nov. 2010.
