= Nicola Mazza =

Italian Catholic priest

Venerable Nicola Mazza
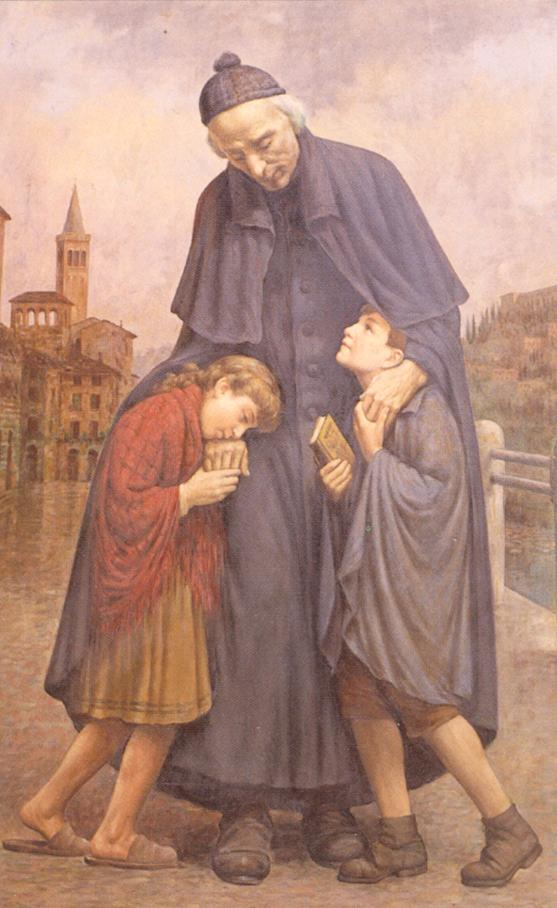
- Portrait.

Priest
- Born: 10 March 1790; Verona, Republic of Venice
- Died: 2 August 1865 (aged 75); Verona, Kingdom of Lombardy–Venetia
- Venerated in: Roman Catholic Church
- Attributes: Priest's attire; Children at his side
- Patronage: Teachers; Missionaries

Nicola Mazza (10 March 1790 – 2 August 1865) was an Italian Catholic priest known for his work in the African missions of the 19th century. He was dedicated to both the evangelization of Central Africa (he used to be called "Don Congo" due to this) and equal access to a good education.

He served as a teacher for over three decades as well as a chaplain and was known for his dedication to the Christian formation of children. Mazza was also a student and close friend to Gaspare Bertoni and was also close with a range of prominent prelates including Daniele Comboni, whom he sent to the missions in Africa.

Mazza's beatification process opened in the 1920s and culminated on 3 June 2013 after Pope Francis confirmed his heroic virtue and named Mazza as Venerable.

== Life ==
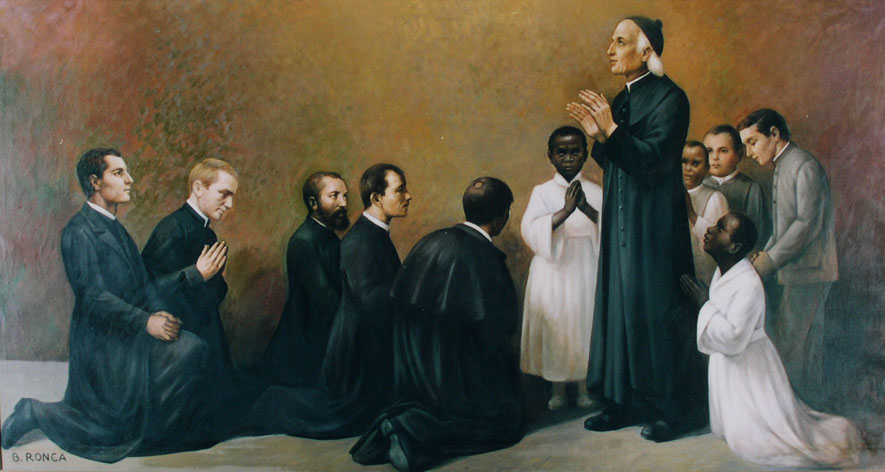
Portrait in the order's headquarters: Mazza blesses missionaries.

Nicola Mazza was born on 10 March 1790 in Verona as the eldest of nine brothers to the silk and fabric merchants Luigi Mazza and Rosa Pajola. His parents managed a fabric store in the Piazza delle Erbe. The Mazza's moved to Marcellise in 1797 following the French occupation; the town was a hamlet of San Martino Buon Albergo. In 1821 his father was forced to sell his estate and villa due to financial difficulties.

He was a student to the priest Antonio Cesari and was also a close disciple to Saint Gaspare Bertoni who both proved to be strong influences on Mazza's life and personal spiritual inclinations. Cesari was brought in to homeschool Mazza since the latter's often frail health prevented him from going to school. His vocation matured under Cesari's guidance and he soon felt called to enter the priesthood as a more direct means to dedicate himself to the needs of the poor. He commenced his ecclesial studies in Verona on 21 June 1807 before Mazza received his ordination to the priesthood on 26 March 1814. Following his ordination he first served in the churches of S. Fermo Maggiore and San Nicolò before being assigned in 1816 to teach seminarians in Verona. For over three decades from 1816 until 1849 he taught students in Verona both mathematics (from 1815 to 1816) and, occasionally, physics and world history. The students held him in high regard as did fellow teachers while some of his students included the Venerable Antonio Provolo and Blessed Zefirino Agostini. It was also around this time that he became a confessor and close friend to the Venerable Teresa Campostrini. His professorship solidified his desire to create a range of opportunities for people to have a fairer and better access to education irrespective of their class or economic status. His companions around this point following his ordination - students and confreres alike - knew of Mazza's desire to evangelize Africa and referred to him as "Don Congo".

On 14 September 1838 the Emperor Ferdinand I awarded him a large golden medal with a necklace in tribute to Mazza's work in the field of culture and education.

Mazza sent six missionaries in 1857 to Central Africa with the hope of evangelizing the region which had been a lifelong ambition for him despite the fact that he never set foot on the African continent. He blessed the new missionaries which included Saint Daniele Comboni and Giovanni Beltrame who became prominent figures in the missions there. Mazza had also sent Francesco Oliboni and Angelo Melotto as well as Alessandro dal Bosco while also sending Isidoro Zilli who was neither a priest nor religious but a catechist. Mazza held the view that the African people alone could be successful in evangelizing since their efforts would be much more successful among their own people as opposed to foreigners.

His health began to decline in July 1865 and he died the following month. The local papers Eco de Veneto and Nuova Gazzetta di Verona followed the news of Mazza's declining health from the outset until Mazza's death a month later after news broke of his failing health. Mazza's remains are interred in the church of San Carlo Borromeo.

== Beatification process ==
Mazza's beatification process opened with an investigation in Verona that ran from 1925 to 1927. Theologians approved Mazza's spiritual writings on 30 March 1931, and a second process opened in Verona in 1934 and was later closed in 1937. The third and final investigation into Mazza's life and works was launched several decades later in 1988 and closed not long after in 1989. The Congregation for the Causes of Saints validated the investigation in Rome on 14 December 1990 and later received the Positio dossier from the postulation in two parts in 2000 and 2003 for assessment. It was in between that period that the historical consultants to the C.C.S. approved the cause on 1 October 2002 based on the part of the Positio that had been submitted in 2002. Theologians advising the C.C.S. likewise confirmed the cause a decade later on 21 February 2012 as did the C.C.S. cardinal and bishop members on 21 May 2013.

Mazza was declared to be Venerable on 3 June 2013 after Pope Francis confirmed that the late priest had lived a life of heroic virtue.

The current postulator for this cause is Fr. Francesco Massagrande.
