= Diocese of Yei =

Roman Catholic diocese in South Sudan

Diocese of Yei Dioecesis Yeiensis
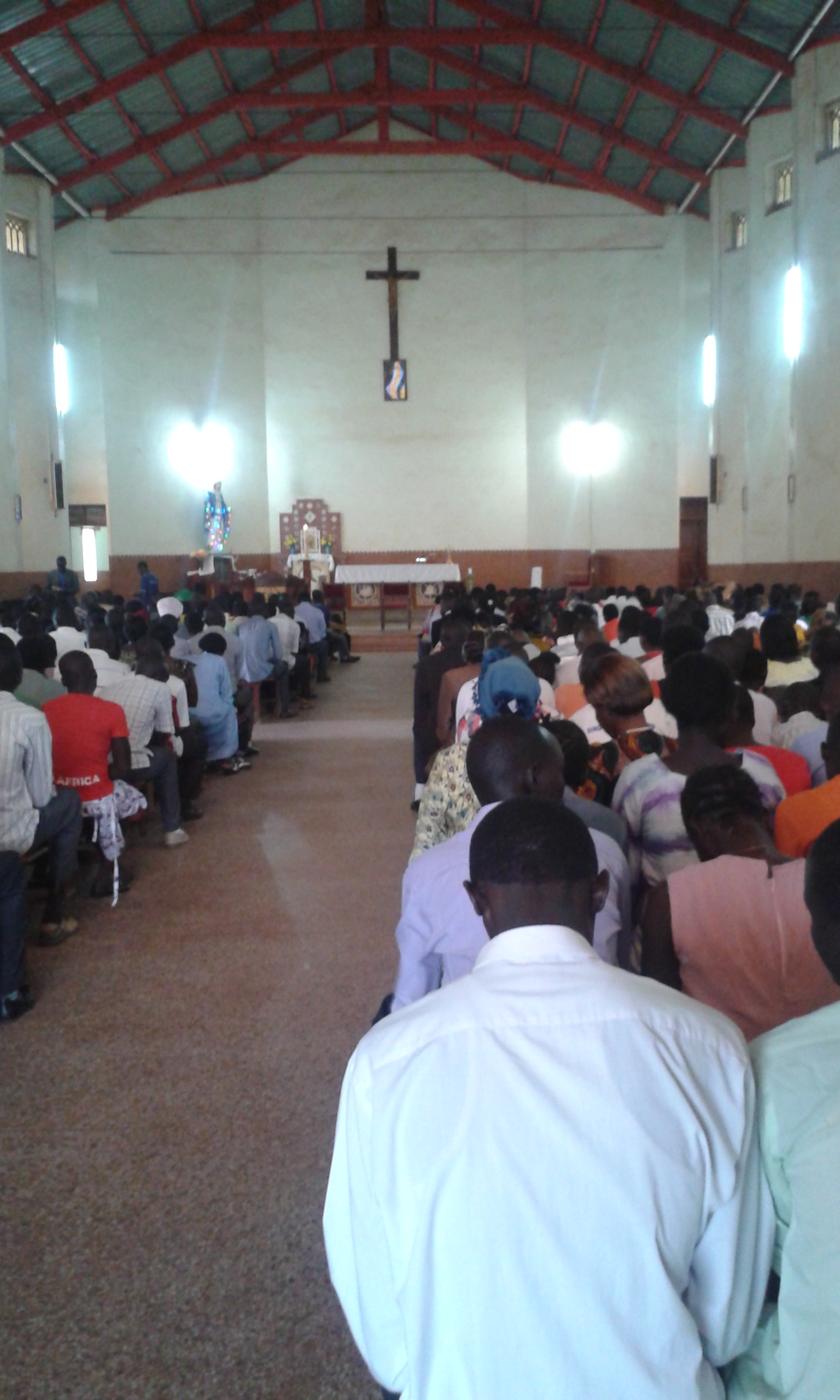
- Worshippers inside Christ the King Cathedral

Location
- Country: South Sudan

Statistics
- Area: 46,000 km^{2} (18,000 sq mi)
- Population: Total; Catholics: 472,600; 231,950 (49.1%)
- Parishes: 9

Information
- Denomination: Catholicism
- Sui iuris church: Latin Church
- Rite: Roman
- Established: March 21, 1986
- Archdiocese: Archdiocese of Juba
- Cathedral: Christ the King Cathedral
- Secular priests: 6

Current leadership
- Bishop: Alex Lodiong Sakor Eyobo
- Bishops emeritus: Erkolano Lodu Tombe

Map
- Location of the Diocese of Yei within South Sudan

The Roman Catholic Diocese of Yei (Latin: Yeien(sis)) is a diocese located in the city of Yei (Yei River County) in the ecclesiastical province of Juba in South Sudan.

== History ==
- March 21, 1986: Established as Diocese of Yei from Archdiocese of Juba

== Leadership ==
- Bishops of Yei (Roman rite)
  - Bishop Erkolano Lodu Tombe (1986.03.21-2022.02.11)
  - Bishop Alex Lodiong Sakor Eyobo (since 11 February 2022)

== See also ==
- Roman Catholicism in South Sudan
- Pojulu Tribe

== Sources ==
- GCatholic.org
- Diocese of Yei website
