= Integral ecology =

Approach emphasizing human and social dimensions

Integral ecology is a holistic approach to ecology, emphasizing human and social dimensions, and the interconnectedness of life on Earth. It studies the relationships between living organisms and the ecosystem in which they develop. The concept was adopted by Pope Francis in his encyclical letter Laudato si' in 2015. The approach has influenced many fields of research and the development of practices and case studies around the world.

== Etymology ==
The use of the term 'integral ecology' probably first appeared in Hillary B. Moore's Marine Ecology in 1958. Since then, multiple authors have used the term to convey unique but overlapping concepts in the intellectual atmosphere of ecology. In the two decades leading up to the encyclical's release, the concept evolved into a formal term, largely due to the contributions of Leonardo Boff and Thomas Berry. According to Ryszard F. Sadowski, parts of Pope Francis's encyclical on integral ecology seem to have been influenced by Boff and Berry. Some similar themes include the holistic approach, the common good, and sustainability.

== Orismology ==
=== Catholic church teaching ===
Integral ecology, as described by Pope Francis in chapter four of his encyclical Laudato si’, is a holistic approach to understanding the interconnectedness of humans, society, and the environment. It posits that the current pace of consumption, waste accumulation, and environmental change is unsustainable and threatens to precipitate global catastrophes.

The encyclical emphasizes the interdependence between humans and nature, although insisting that we are often not aware of it, we depend on these larger systems for our own existence". Vital processes such as carbon dioxide regulation, water purification, waste decomposition, soil formation, and many other processes, which facilitate life on Earth, are too often taken for granted.

Pope Francis called for a shift from an individualistic, consumer-driven culture to one that prioritizes the common good. This includes combating poverty, restoring dignity to marginalized communities, and protecting the environment. He asserted that "[t]he global economic crises have made painfully obvious the detrimental effects of disregarding our common destiny, which cannot exclude those who come after us." Thus, intergenerational solidarity is crucial for sustainable development.

Integral ecology extends beyond environmental protection to encompass themes such as the health of societal institutions, cultural preservation, and urban planning. The encyclical stresses the importance of creating inclusive cities that foster a sense of belonging and shared responsibility. It also highlights the ethical dimensions of environmental care, the intrinsic dignity of the human person, and the need to respect the moral law.

By framing environmental challenges as interconnected with social and economic issues, Pope Francis offered a vision for addressing the complex crises facing humanity. His concept of integral ecology provided a foundation for building a more just, equitable, and sustainable world.

The Catholic Church's Dicastery for Promoting Integral Human Development and Dicastery for the Laity, Family and Life jointly published a document on "Integral Ecology in the Life of the Family" in April 2026.

=== Berry's integral ecology ===
The concept of integral ecology has been (significantly) influenced by cultural historian Thomas Berry. According to Berry, humanity has entered a period of ecological crisis due to excessive anthropocentrism and consumerism, leading to the exploitation and devastation of the planet. Berry criticized the destructive impact of modern technologies, such as chemical fertilizers and deforestation, which have depleted natural resources and harmed the environment. He argued that while humans have traditionally held a spiritual connection to nature, this reverence has diminished in recent centuries, leading to a loss of ecological wisdom.

To address this crisis, Berry envisioned an "Ecozoic Era", characterized by a harmonious relationship between humans and the earth. Berry added that "[t]his new geobiological period is the condition for the integral functioning of the planet in all phases of its activities, whether these be biological, ecological, economic, cultural, or religious." Being part of the Ecozoic Era would require a fundamental shift in human consciousness and the recognition that everything in this universe is sacred and interconnected.

Berry introduced the "integral ecologist" as the personification of the Ecozoic Era. This individual would serve as a spokesperson for the planet, advocating for its protection and restoration. The integral ecologist would be able to bridge the gap between scientific knowledge and spiritual wisdom. In recognizing the complex nature of the universe as a dynamic and evolving system, integral ecologists would be able regain their spiritual understanding of the cosmos and their ability to cultivate planetary well-being.

=== Boff's integral ecology ===
In “Liberation Theology and Ecology: Alternative, Confrontation, or Complementarity?”, a chapter in “Ecology and Poverty: Cry of the Earth, Cry of the Poor” (1995), Leonardo Boff explores the intersection between liberation theology and ecological discourse, emphasizing the shared concern for addressing poverty and environmental degradation. According to Boff, both disciplines originate from cries of oppression; with liberation theology from the cry of the poor for dignity and freedom, and ecology from the cry of the earth under systematic exploitation. Boff cites Exodus 3:7 and Romans 8:22-23 as scriptural foundations for these cries, thereby pairing the struggle of the poor with the suffering of the earth. He advocates for an integrated approach that unites social and ecological liberation in the pursuit of a sustainable and just future.

Boff introduces the concept of "integral ecology," as a way to integrate all dimensions of ecology – economic, social, cultural, political, and spiritual – into a new alliance between humanity and nature. Liberation theology, traditionally focused on the plight of the poor, is presented as needing to adopt this new ecological cosmology. In order to ensure our well-being, it must recognize Earth as a conscious entity and see humanity as its mode of expression. Boff emphasizes "it is the earth itself that, through one of its expressions – the human species – takes on a conscious direction in this new phase of the process of evolution."

In light of this evolution, the chapter highlights the importance of the landmark document "The Limits to Growth", released by the Club of Rome in 1972, which drew attention to Earth's finite resources and the serious risks associated with industrialization. Boff echoes these concerns, noting the alarming rate at which species are disappearing, and in criticizing the anthropocentrism and consumerism that underpin contemporary society. He advocates for a shift towards recognizing the earth as a "superorganism", called Gaia, in which all elements – both living and non-living – are interconnected in a dynamic equilibrium.

Finally, Boff pleads for sustainability that respects the rhythms of ecosystems and promotes an economy of sufficiency for all, hence ensuring the common good extends beyond humans to all creation. According to Boff, the holistic approach, which combines liberation theology with ecological discourse, is essential in addressing the enduring hostility towards Earth and its inhabitants. In a way, Earth urges us to reconnect with all things, and thus with "the thread that binds everything upwards, God."

=== Wilber's integral ecology ===
In 1995, the same year that Leonardo Boff first published the term "integral ecology," the philosopher Ken Wilber independently applied the word "integral" to ecological thought in his book Sex, Ecology, Spirituality, presenting it through his AQAL ("all quadrants, all levels") model, which maps any phenomenon across individual and collective, and interior and exterior, dimensions. Thomas Berry, working independently of both, was also describing his own project in these years as an "integral cosmology or integral ecology," so that Boff, Wilber, and Berry are together regarded as having launched explicitly integral approaches to ecology in the same year.

Wilber's framework was developed into a full-length ecological theory by the integral theorist Sean Esbjörn-Hargens and the environmental philosopher Michael E. Zimmerman in their 2009 book Integral Ecology: Uniting Multiple Perspectives on the Natural World. Rather than proposing a single environmental ethic, Esbjörn-Hargens and Zimmerman set out an "ecology of ecologies" that seeks to hold together the many, sometimes contradictory, perspectives from which humans and other organisms relate to the natural world — the idea, for instance, that a tree looks and means something different to an ecologist, an economist, a bear, and a beetle, and that workable environmental solutions need to coordinate rather than choose between such perspectives. Their approach explicitly rejects any single framework as final, describing their own 800-page study as only a preliminary sketch of the field.

=== Morin's general ecology ===
Although he never adopted the term "integral ecology" himself, the French sociologist and philosopher Edgar Morin (b. 1921) is regarded as an important precursor to the concept. In 1980, well before the term "integral ecology" was coined, Morin proposed a "general ecology" in La Vie de la Vie (The Life of Life), the second volume of his six-volume work La Méthode. For Morin, ecological and human or social systems are so deeply intertwined that a general ecology must take in the anthropo-social dimension just as social theory must take in the ecological one. This general ecology rests on what Morin calls "complex thought," a transdisciplinary method that crosses the boundaries of the biophysical sciences, social theory, politics, and psychology, and that treats the whole and its parts — the planet and the humans within it — as mutually implicated in one another rather than as separate levels of reality. Because of this framework, later scholars of integral ecology have treated Morin's paradigm of complexity as a foundational theoretical expression of the field, even though it circulated under a different name.

=== Multiple integral ecologies ===
Because the concept has arisen independently in several thinkers rather than from a single school, and because contributors emphasize that no one framework should be treated as final, scholars have increasingly spoken of integral ecologies in the plural. This plurality is the organizing theme of the edited volume The Variety of Integral Ecologies: Nature, Culture, and Knowledge in the Planetary Era (2017), edited by Sam Mickey, Sean Kelly, and Adam Robbert, which traces the concept's roots through Berry, Boff, Wilber, and Morin, among other precursors, while also presenting newer theoretical and applied approaches. In his contribution to that volume, "Five Principles of Integral Ecology," Sean Kelly proposes that an ecological approach can be called integral to the extent that it situates itself in an evolutionary context, adopts a planetary scope, reaches beyond disciplinary boundaries, affirms a sacred or enchanted universe, and remains committed to practical engagement.

See also Soil, Soul, Society, a related, independently articulated trinity of ecological, personal, and social well-being proposed by the peace activist Satish Kumar. Kumar does not use the term "integral ecology," and his framework is not discussed in the scholarly literature on integral ecology surveyed above; it is listed here as a kindred but separately developed holistic approach.
