= Daniele Comboni =

Italian Catholic bishop (1831–1881)

Coordinates: 45°26′46″N 11°0′21″E

Saint Daniele Comboni MCCJ
- Vicar Apostolic of Central Africa
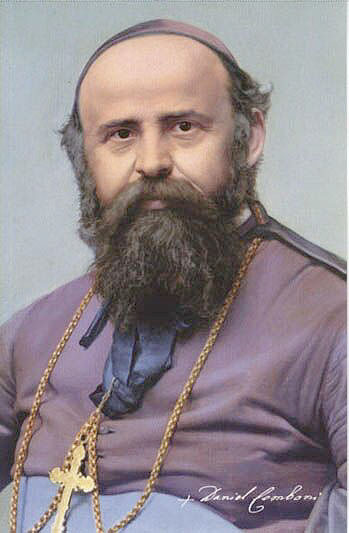
- Church: Roman Catholic Church
- Archdiocese: Khartoum
- Metropolis: Khartoum
- See: Khartoum
- Appointed: 31 July 1877
- Term ended: 10 October 1881
- Predecessor: Ignacij Knoblehar
- Successor: Francesco Sogaro
- Other post: Titular Bishop of Claudiopolis in Isauria (1877–1881)
- Previous post: Pro-Vicar Apostolic of Central Africa (1872–1877)

Orders
- Ordination: 31 December 1854 by Johann Nepomuk von Tschiderer zu Gleifheim
- Consecration: 12 August 1877 by Alessandro Franchi
- Rank: Bishop

Personal details
- Born: Daniele Comboni; 15 March 1831 Limone sul Garda, Kingdom of Lombardy–Venetia
- Died: 10 October 1881 (aged 50) Khartoum, Sudan, Khedivate of Egypt
- Motto: In hoc vinces

Sainthood
- Feast day: 10 October
- Venerated in: Roman Catholic Church
- Beatified: 17 March 1996; Saint Peter's Basilica, Vatican City, by Pope John Paul II
- Canonized: 5 October 2003; Saint Peter's Square, Vatican City, by Pope John Paul II
- Attributes: Episcopal attire
- Patronage: Missionaries; Aid workers; Comboni Missionary Sisters; Comboni Missionaries of the Heart of Jesus

Daniele Comboni, MCCJ (15 March 1831 – 10 October 1881) was an Italian Catholic prelate who served as Vicar Apostolic of Central Africa from 1877 until his death in 1881. He worked in the missions in Africa and was the founder of both the Comboni Missionaries of the Heart of Jesus and the Comboni Missionary Sisters.

Comboni studied under Nicola Mazza in Verona where he became a multi-linguist and in 1849 vowed to join the missions in the African continent although this did not occur until 1857 when he travelled to Sudan. He continued to travel back and forth from his assignment to his native land in order to found his congregations and attend to other matters, and returned in 1870 for the First Vatican Council in Rome until its premature closing due to conflict.

Comboni attempted to draw attention across Europe to the plight of the people living in poverty-stricken areas in the African continent and from 1865 until mid-1865 travelled across Europe to places such as London and Paris to collect funds for a project he started to tend to the poor and ill. His mission to Africa was strengthened with his appointment as a bishop in 1877 for it allowed him greater freedom to establish branches of his order in Khartoum and Cairo amongst other locations.

Comboni was beatified by Pope John Paul II in St. Peter's Basilica on 17 March 1996 and his canonization came on 5 October 2003.

== Life ==
=== Birth and ordination ===
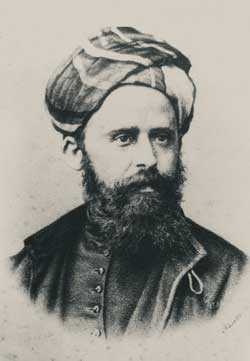
Comboni in 1873 while in Africa.

Daniele Comboni was born on 15 March 1831 at Limone sul Garda in Brescia to the poor gardeners (working for a local proprietor) Luigi Comboni and Domenica Pace as the fourth of eight children; he was the sole child to survive into adulthood. At that time Limone was under the jurisdiction of the Austrian-Hungarian Empire.

At the age of twelve, he was sent to school in Verona on 20 February 1843 at the Religious Institute of Verona, founded by Nicola Mazza. It was there that he completed his studies in medicine and languages (he learnt French, English and Arabic) and prepared to become a priest. On 6 January 1849 he vowed that he would join the African missions, a desire he had held since 1846 after reading about the Japanese martyrs. On 31 December 1854 in Trento he received his ordination to the priesthood from the Bishop of Trent, Johann Nepomuk von Tschiderer zu Gleifheim. Comboni made a pilgrimage to the Holy Land from 29 September to 14 October 1855. In 1857 – with the blessing of his mother – he left for Africa along with five other missionaries, also former students of Mazza. His mother gave him her blessing and said to him: "Go, Daniele, and may the Lord bless you". He departed on 8 September 1857 with Giovanni Beltrame, Alessandro dal Bosco, Francesco Oliboni, Angelo Melotto and Isidoro Zilli who hailed from Udine.

=== Missionary ===
Four months later, on 8 January 1858 he reached Khartoum in Sudan. His assignment was the liberation of enslaved boys and girls. There were difficulties including an unbearable climate and sickness as well as the deaths of several of his fellow missionaries; this, added with the poor and derelict conditions that the population faced made the situation all the more difficult. He had written to his parents of the conditions and the difficulties that the group faced but remained resolved. He witnessed the death of one of his companions and instead of deterring him he remained determined to continue and wrote: "O Nigrizia o morte!" (translation: "Either Africa or death"). By the end of 1859 three of the five had died and two were in Cairo as Comboni himself grew ill. Comboni was in his new surroundings from 1858 until 15 January 1859 when he was forced to return to Verona due a bout of malaria. He taught at Mazza's institute from 1861 until 1864. He soon worked out fresh strategies for the missions while back in his native land in 1864. He visited Saint Peter's tomb in Rome on 15 September 1864 and it was while reflecting before the tomb that he came upon the idea of a "Plan for the Rebirth of Africa" which was a project with the slogan "Save Africa through Africa". Four days later, on 19 September, he met with Pope Pius IX to discuss his project.

Comboni wanted the European continent and the Universal Church to be more concerned with the African continent. He carried out appeals throughout Europe from December 1864 to June 1865 for spiritual and material aid for the African missions from people including monarchical families as well as bishops and nobles. Travelling under an Austrian consular visa, he went to France and Spain before heading north to England and then setting off to Germany and Austria. The humanitarian "Society of Cologne" became a main supporter of his work. It was around this time that he launched a magazine – the first in his homeland to delve into the missions for it was designed to be an exclusive magazine for those in the missions.

He established a male institute on 1 June 1867 and one for women in 1872 both in Verona: the Istituto delle Missioni per la Nigrizia (since 1894 the Comboni Missionaries of the Heart of Jesus) and the Istituto delle Pie Madri (later the Comboni Missionary Sisters) on 1 January 1872. On 7 May 1867 he had an audience with Pope Pius IX and brought with him twelve African girls to meet the pope while in late 1867 opened two branches of the order in Cairo. Comboni was the first to bring women into this form of work in Africa and he founded new missions in El Obeid and Delen amongst other Sudanese cities. Comboni was well-versed in the Arabic language and also spoke in several African dialects (Dinka, Bari and Nubia) as well as six European languages. On 2 April 1868 he was decorated with the Order of the Knight of Italy but he refused this in fidelity to Pius IX. On 7 July 1868 he left for France where he visited the shrine of La Salette on 26 July before heading to Germany and Austria. On 20 February 1869 he left Marseille for Cairo where he opened a third house on 15 March.

Among Comboni's early companions during his early years in Africa was Catarina Zenab, a Dinka who would go on to serve as a missionary in Khartoum later in her life.

=== Episcopate and death ===
On 9 March 1870 he left Cairo for Rome and arrived there on 15 March where he took part in the First Vatican Council as the theologian of the Bishop of Verona, Luigi di Canossa; he formulated the "Postulatum pro Nigris Africæ Centralis" on 24 June, a petition for the evangelization of Africa that was signed by 70 bishops. The First Vatican Council was terminated due to the outbreak of the Franco-Prussian War and the dissolution of the Papal States before the document could be discussed. In mid-1877 he was named as the Vicar Apostolic of Central Africa and received his episcopal consecration on 12 August 1877 from Cardinal Alessandro Franchi. His episcopal appointment was seen as a confirmation that his ideas and his activities – which some deemed to be foolish – were recognised as an effective means for the proclamation of the gospel. In 1877 and again in 1878 there were droughts in the region followed by mass starvation; the local population was halved, and the religious personnel and their activities were reduced almost to nothing.

On 27 November 1880, though ill, he traveled to the missions in Sudan from Naples for the eighth and final time to act against the slave trade. He arrived in Khartoum on 9 August and visited the Nubia mountains. He suffered a high fever from 5 October, and died in Khartoum on 10 October during a cholera epidemic. Pope Leo XIII mourned his death as a "great loss".

== Legacy ==
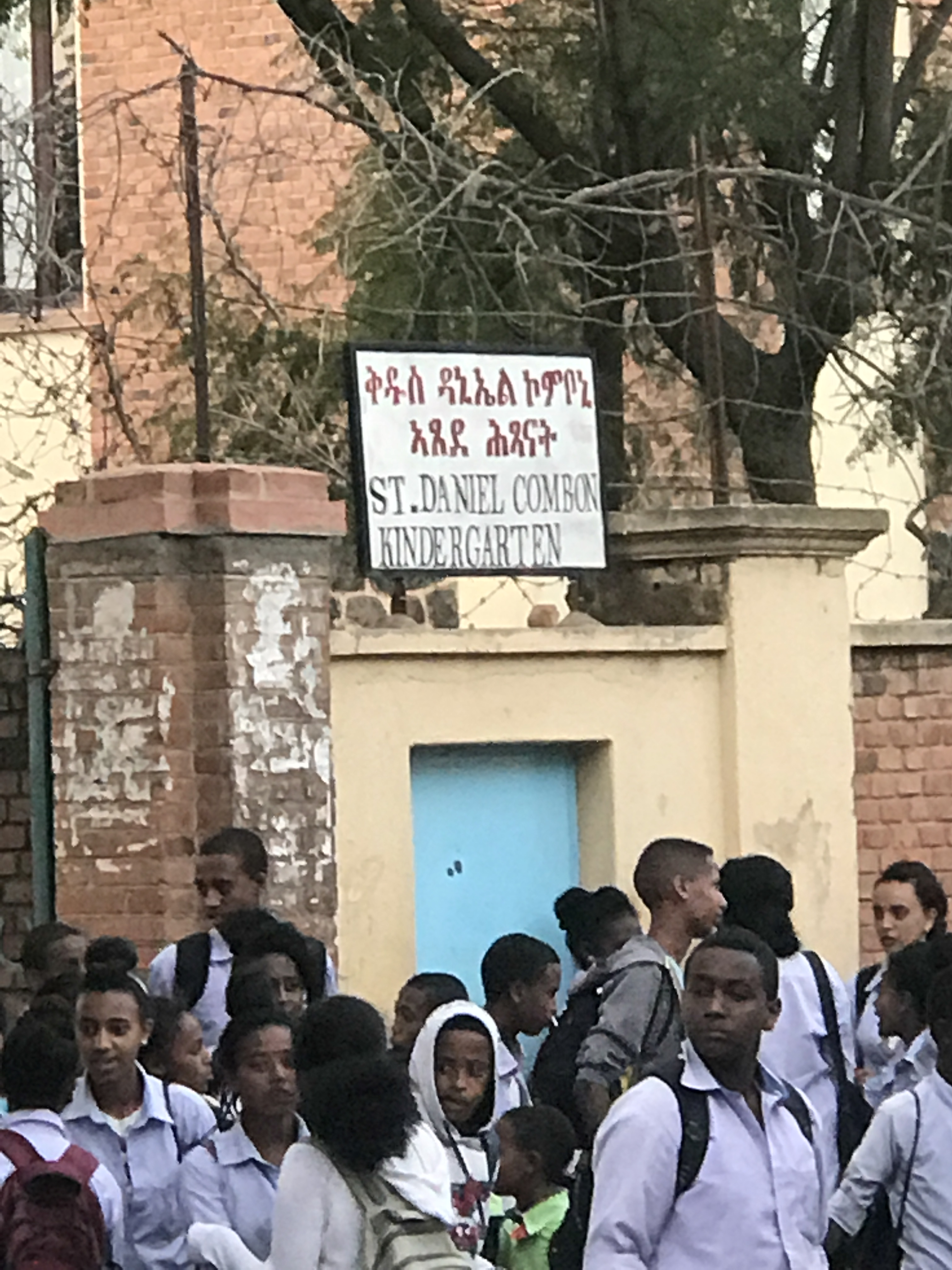
St. Daniel Comboni Kindergarten in Eritrea.

Bishop Antonio Maria Roveggio (1850–1902) served as the order's superior sometime after Comboni died. The male order received the papal decree of praise on 7 June 1895 and full papal approval from Pope Pius X on 19 February 1910. As of 2018, the men's order operates in about twenty-eight countries, including Egypt, Sudan, Eritrea, Brazil, Colombia, and the Philippines. Members of the order were acknowledged in the 2020s to have committed sex abuse against teenagers studying to be missionary priests in the 1960s and 1970s.

The female order received the decree of praise on 22 February 1897 and papal approval on 10 June 1912. In 2008 there were 1529 religious in 192 houses. The order operates in Europe in countries such as the United Kingdom, in Africa in nations including Cameroon and Mozambique, in the Americas in countries including Costa Rica and Ecuador, and in Asia in countries including Israel and Jordan.

== Sainthood ==
The canonization cause started with an informative process in Verona which Bishop Girolamo Cardinale oversaw from 14 February 1928 until 21 November 1929, while Bishop Paolo Tranquillo Silvestri oversaw another informative process in Khartoum from 6 February 1929 until 7 June 1929. The postulation later compiled a Positio dossier and sent it to the Congregation for the Causes of Saints in 1982, while theologians approved his writings as being in line with the magisterium on 3 May 1982; historians also approved the cause later on 21 February 1989 after having deemed that no historical obstacles existed in relation to the cause. Six theologians approved the dossier on 12 October 1993 while the C.C.S. validated the two informative processes on 5 November 1993 prior to the C.C.S. cardinal and bishop members approving the cause on 14 December 1993. On 26 March 1994 the confirmation of his life of heroic virtue enabled Pope John Paul II to title him as Venerable.

The miracle required for Comboni to be beatified was investigated on a diocesan level in São Mateus from 10 December 1990 until 29 June 1992 before it received C.C.S. validation on 30 April 1993. The miracle was 25 December 1970 healing of the Afro-Brazilian child Maria Giuseppa Oliveira Paixão who underwent a stomach surgical procedure for an infection that grew worse over time. But their attention turned to Comboni's intercession and she was healed the next morning in a case that surprised the doctor. The seven medical experts approved that science could not explain this cure on 9 June 1994 while six theologians agreed likewise on 22 November 1994 as did the C.C.S. members on 24 January 1995. John Paul II confirmed on 6 April 1995 that this healing was indeed a miracle and beatified Comboni in Saint Peter's Basilica on 17 March 1996.

The miracle required for him to be sainted was investigated in Khartoum from 9 to 28 May 2001 and received C.C.S. validation on 3 September 2001 before a medical panel approved it on 11 April 2002; the theologians followed suit on 6 September 2002 as did the C.C.S. on 15 October 2002. John Paul II confirmed this miracle on 20 December 2002 and scheduled the date for Comboni's canonization in a papal consistory held on 20 February 2003; the pope canonized Comboni in Saint Peter's Square on 5 October 2003. The miracle in question was the healing of the Muslim mother Lubana Abdel Aziz (b. 1965) who – on 11 November 1997 – was admitted into a Khartoum hospital for a caesarean section; the hospital was one that the Comboni Missionary Sisters managed. The infant was born but the mother suffered from repeated bleeding and other serious problems and was at the point of death on 13 November despite a blood transfusion. The doctors were pessimistic about her chances but the nuns prayed a novena to Comboni. The woman did not die, defying expectations, and was discharged from the hospital, completely recovered, on 18 November.
