= Roman Catholic Archdiocese of Juba =

Catholic archdiocese in South Sudan

Coordinates: 4.8500°N 31.6000°E

Archdiocese of Juba Archidioecesis Iubaënsis

Location
- Country: South Sudan

Statistics
- Area: 25,137 km^{2} (9,705 sq mi)
- Population: Total; Catholics: (as of 2014); 995,000; 725,814 (72.9%)
- Parishes: 14

Information
- Denomination: Catholic Church
- Rite: Roman Rite
- Established: 1927
- Cathedral: St. Theresa Cathedral
- Secular priests: 58

Current leadership
- Pope: Leo XIV
- Archbishop: Stephen Ameyu Martin Mulla
- Auxiliary Bishops: Santo Loku Pio Doggale

An overview of Roman Catholic Dioceses in South Sudan and Sudan. Number 8 is Juba.

The Roman Catholic Archdiocese of Juba (Latin: Iubaën(sis)) is the Metropolitan See for the ecclesiastical province of Juba in South Sudan.

== History ==
- 14 July 1927: Established as Apostolic Prefecture of Bahr el-Gebel from the Apostolic Prefecture of Nilo Equatoriale in Uganda
- 12 April 1951: Promoted as Apostolic Vicariate of Bahr el-Gebel
- 26 May 1961: Renamed as Apostolic Vicariate of Juba
- 12 December 1974: Promoted as Metropolitan Archdiocese of Juba

== Special churches ==
The seat of the archbishop is Saint Teresa’s Cathedral in the Kator district of the city of Juba.

== Ordinaries ==
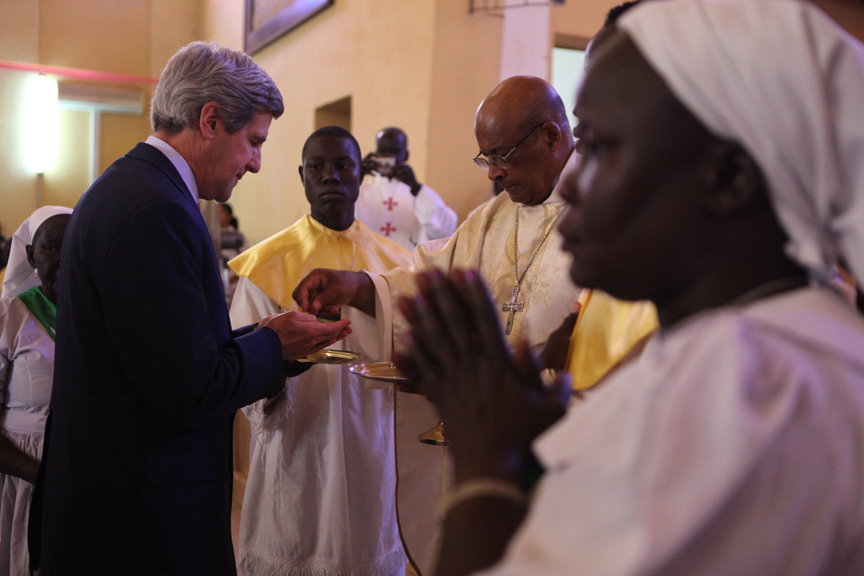
U.S. Senator John Kerry receives Communion at a special referendum Mass at the Kator Catholic Cathedral, 9 January 2011

Prefects Apostolic of Bahr el-Gebel

- Giuseppe Zambonardi, MCCJ (1 February 1928 – 1938)
- Stephen Mlakic, FSCJ (21 October 1938 – 1950)

Vicar Apostolic of Bahr el-Gebel

- Sisto Mazzoldi, FSCJ (8 July 1950 – 21 April 1951)

Vicar Apostolic of Juba

- Sisto Mazzoldi, FSCJ (21 April 1951 – 12 June 1967), appointed Apostolic Administrator of Moroto, Uganda in 1965

Metropolitan Archbishops of Juba

- Ireneus Wien Dud (12 December 1974 – 1982)
- Paulino Lukudu Loro, MCCJ (19 February 1983 – 12 December 2019)
- Stephen Ameyu Martin Mulla (12 December 2019 – present)

=== Auxiliary Bishops ===
- Santo Loku Pio Doggale (2010–present)
- Paride Taban (1980–1983), appointed Bishop of Torit

== Suffragan Dioceses ==
- Malakal
- Rumbek
- Tombura–Yambio
- Torit
- Wau
- Yei

== See also ==
- Radio Bakhita
- Roman Catholicism in South Sudan
- List of Roman Catholic dioceses in South Sudan

== Sources ==
- GCatholic.org
- Archdiocese of Juba
