= Catholic Church in South Sudan =

The Catholic Church in South Sudan is composed of one ecclesiastical province with one archdiocese and six suffragan dioceses. There have been a total of 31 bishops in South Sudan to date. The bishops of South Sudan and Sudan are currently members of one single bishops' conference, designated as Sudan Catholic Bishops’ Conference.

It is the largest church in South Sudan. According to the World Christian Encyclopedia, the Catholic Church was the largest single Christian body in Sudan since 1995, with 2.7 million Catholics mainly concentrated in South Sudan. Later estimates suggested that 37.2% of the population is Catholic, with about 6.2 million Catholics out of a total population of 16.7 million. Figures in 2020 noted that Catholics had become more than half of the country's population.

The patron saint is Josephine Bakhita. Bakhita was born in Darfur in 1869 and kidnapped at the age of 6 by slavers. She was sold three times and beaten regularly. She was ransomed by Callisto Legnani, an Italian consul, converted to Christianity in a Venetian school and became a nun. She was canonized in October 2000 after being beatified in 1992. Her name became well known in southern Sudan during the Second Sudanese Civil War because of Christianity’s repression by the Sudanese government and that government’s use of slavery. Bakhita’s influence is recognized through a Catholic radio station based in Juba named Radio Bakhita.

The current president Salva Kiir is Catholic.

== History ==
=== 19th Century ===
Catholic missionaries arrived in Sudan in 1842, building schools and hospitals. In 1849, Dr. Knoblecher, the third leader of the Vicariate Apostolic Central Africa, which reached Khartoum, Sudan in 1848, led an exploratory expedition to southern Sudan and set up the first Catholic mission there at Gondokoro in 1852. That same year, 8 men were baptized. An additional station was opened at modern-day Kansia in 1854. By 1858, 22 missionaries had died in Sudan. Father Matthias Kirchner became leader of the mission and gave the mission up to the Franciscans believing that they had the numbers and resources to survive sicknesses. More deaths led Pope Pius IX to close the mission. In 1864, Daniele Comboni developed A Plan for the Regeneration of Africa by means of Africans, in which he proposed training centers for priests and missionaries in Central Africa. He did not return to southern Sudan, but Deng Sorur, the first southern Sudanese Catholic priest, studied with Comboni. The Comboni Mission was established between 1895 and 1910 and played a role in spreading Christianity in South Sudan.

=== 20th Century ===
In the early 20th century, the Anglo-Egyptian Condominium government encouraged missionary organizations to start schools in southern Sudan. In 1900, Monseigner Antonio Riveggio established a mission in Lul. In 1904, three more missions were started in Bahr al-Ghazal. In 1905, Catholics opened Stack Memorial School as a mission station and to prepare children of chiefs to work for the colonial government. In February 1907, Father Paolo Maroni baptized the first 8 Christians at Kangnjo. By 1913, between 200 and 300 Southerners had been baptized at Wau. Wau became the administrative center of the Vicariate Apostolic that same year. It became a diocese in 1974.

When the government wanted increased cooperation with missions in education in the 1920s, the Catholic missions differed from the Protestant missions in that they believed the government should help the Church educate southern Sudanese. Comboni technical schools in [Bahr el Ghazal] had boys learning carpentry, bricklaying and gardening. Girls learned religion, English, needlework and hygiene. The language of school teaching was addressed a lot in the 1930s, with some Catholic schools using a local language and other schools arguing that it was better to use English. Boys associations for alumni of some schools were also created in the 1930s and 1940s to promote interethnic engagement. Despite this, some Dinka mission school graduates believed they received unequal treatment from the Catholic church. They believed it was because the Dinka were seen as too independent-minded for the Church. Some priests refused to sit on the ground or drink water at Dinka compounds. Some washed their hands immediately after shaking hands with the Dinka.

In the 1930s, Catholic missionaries produced the first periodicals in southern Sudan. One of these, the Messenger, was founded in Wau by Father Eduardo Mason of the Verona Fathers. It produced biweekly editions that familiarized people with Catholic teaching. It played a role in cultivating a "Southern" identity in Sudan. It fostered interethnic dialogue through the translation of vernacular songs and use of a variety of words for Jesus. It also spoke about general news in southern Sudan, including Catholic positions on politics. It mentioned political officials who represented the interests of the South. On 1 March 1956, the newspaper caught the attention of the Sudanese Government when following the Torit Mutiny, a regional revolt, an article entitled “They Died A Good Death” framed some perpetrators, who were later executed, as martyrs.

In 1957, General Ibrahim Abboud, the political leader of Sudan, nationalized missionary schools in the South and subsidized Muslim educational institutions and mosques in a process of Islamification. When the Sudanese government replaced Sunday with Friday as the Southern weekly holiday in February 1960, Paolino Doggale, a priest, printed papers of protest for school students who protested the government’s attempt to Islamify them. Documents that mentioned the government's persecution of Christianity continued to be produced by priests and those educated in Catholic schools throughout the 1960s. One from Sudanese Catholic leaders in October 1965 expressed feelings that the policies that restricted the Church were works of the devil.

During the civil war, letters between priests asked for God’s help in defeating the Arabs and contributed some developments to religious intervention. Many figures in the Southern political life, including separatist MP Saturnino Lohure, Ireneo Dud, Archangel Ali, and Angelo Tutuo were priests. Lohure co-founded a liberation organization, the Sudan African national Union. Angelo Tutuo resigned from the priesthood by 1955 though, citing unfair treatment from the Verona Fathers, including with issues of celibacy. The 1972 peace deal, which ended the war, was not accepted by some Catholics.

Following the First Sudanese Civil War (1955-1972), Father Hubert Barbier, a French White Father built a medical center in Wau with the support of local clergy. The goal of the center was to assist in reconstructing the area, put medical infrastructure into place and make possible the training of nurses and doctors. The Second Sudanese Civil War (1983-2005) made the infrastructure unusable; however it reopened in February 2010 under the name Catholic Health Training Institute (CHTI). During the Second Sudanese Civil War, the Wunlit Peace Agreement of 1998 had the New Sudan Council of Churches, an ecumenical organization, bringing chiefs together to talk about peace. In 2000, Bishop Paride Taban established the Kuron Peace Village. He has maintained it since then. Catholic officials were also involved in other attempts for peace during this period.

=== 21st Century ===
Shortly before the vote for the 2011 independence referendum for South Sudan, Archbishop Paulino Loro pleaded mass attendees at the Kator Cathedral in Juba to vote for secession. While fighting between the Dinka and Nuer tribe was ongoing in the South Sudanese Civil War, Loro claimed that politicians were forgetting they were serving the same country in his Easter mass in 2014 while many government officials, including Kiir were in attendance. Bishop Paride Taban was the mediator of the Church Leaders Mediation Initiative, an organization which played a role in a May 2014 ceasefire.

The South Sudan Council of Churches (SSCC), an ecumenical body of Christian churches in South Sudan which was created during the Sudanese Civil War, has Father James Oyet Latansio, a Catholic priest, as the general secretary. This organization created the “Action Plan for Peace”, a church-led strategy to address causes and effects of the current civil war. A delegation of the SSCC met with Pope Francis, the head of the Catholic Church, in 2018 to discuss a possible visit of the Pope to South Sudan to help with peacemaking efforts in the current South Sudanese Civil War, after a planned 2017 trip was cancelled. James Wani Igga, the vice president of South Sudan accused priests of promoting violence in April 2018.

April 10–11, 2019, Kiir and Riek Machar, the opposition leader, had a retreat at the Vatican. After asking Kiir and Machar to keep the peace made in the September 2018 peace agreement in Ethiopia, Pope Francis kneeled and kissed the shoes of both leaders. The South Sudanese Bishops released a pastoral letter following their February 26–28, 2019 Juba meeting, indicating their belief that the peace deal would not last. They wrote that the root problems of the conflict were not addressed and that the actions for peace stipulated in the agreement had not yet been carried out. They promised to continue peace efforts based on the Action Plan for Peace.

In 2022 the new Catholic bishop of Rumbek, Christian Carlassare, stated that "More than half the population of South Sudan is Christian, only 8% are Muslim. Other groups live on the margins, and have not drawn close to the Gospel. However, we live in a country where Christianity is often no more than skin deep, it hasn’t grown roots in the life of the population."

Overview of Catholic dioceses in Sudan and South Sudan: Sudan: 1 Diocese of El Obeid 2 Archdiocese of Khartoum South Sudan: 3 Diocese of Wau 4 Diocese of Rumbek 5 Diocese of Malakal 6 Diocese of Tombura-Yambio 7 Diocese of Yei 8 Archdiocese of Juba 9 Diocese of Torit

== List of dioceses ==
=== Ecclesiastical Province of Juba ===
- Archdiocese of Juba
  - Diocese of Malakal
  - Diocese of Rumbek
  - Diocese of Tombura-Yambio
  - Diocese of Torit
  - Diocese of Wau
  - Diocese of Yei

== Freedom of religion ==
In 2023, the country was scored 1 out of 4 for religious freedom; this was mainly due to the threat of ethnic violence.

== See also ==
- Religion in South Sudan
- List of saints from Africa
