= Comboni Missionaries of the Heart of Jesus =

Catholic religious order

- Missionarii Comboniani Cordis Iesu
- Abbreviation: MCCJ
- Nickname: Verona Fathers
- Formation: 1 June 1867; 159 years ago
- Founder: Daniele Comboni
- Founded at: Verona, Italy
- Type: Clerical Religious Congregation of Pontifical Right for Men
- Headquarters: Via Luigi Lilio 80, Rome, Italy
- Members: 1,576 members (includes 1,103 priests) as of 2020
- Superior General: Tesfaye Tadesse Gebresilasie
- Parent organization: Catholic Church
- Website: comboni.org
- Formerly called: Sons of the Sacred Heart of Jesus

The Comboni Missionaries of the Heart of Jesus (Latin: Missionarii Comboniani Cordis Iesu), also known as the Comboni Missionaries of the Sacred Heart, or the Verona Fathers, and originally called the Sons of the Sacred Heart of Jesus (Congregatio Filiorum S. Cordis Iesu), is a Catholic clerical male religious congregation of pontifical right.

== History ==
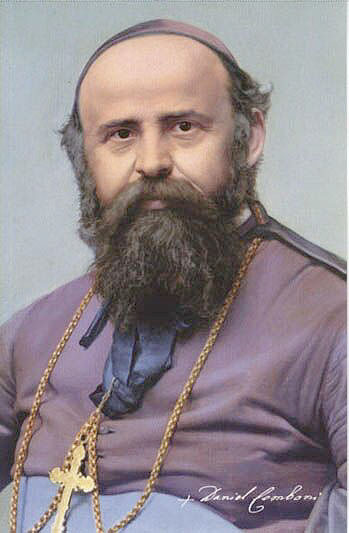
Daniele Comboni, founder of the congregation

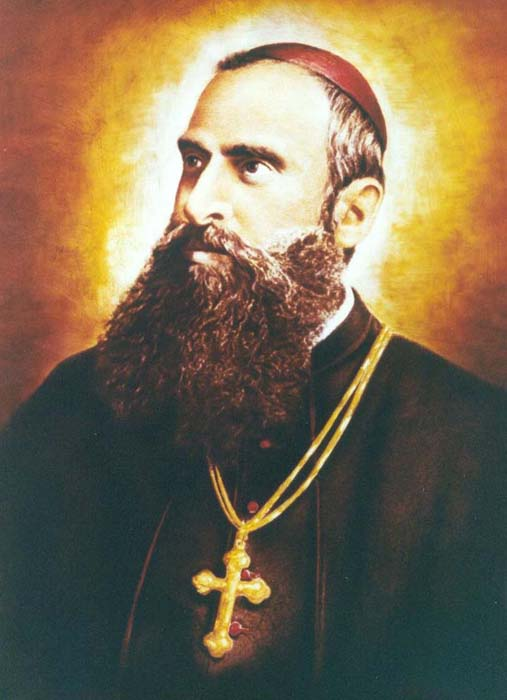
Antonio Maria Roveggio, 3rd Superior General of the congregation

The congregation was founded on 1 June 1867 by Daniele Comboni, who was born into a humble family of laborers. Comboni entered the institute opened in Verona by Nicola Mazza for the education of the poor. Mazza's institute was also involved in the work of evangelization of the territories of Central Africa.

In 1854, Comboni was ordained a priest, and on 14 February 1858, he settled in the Vicariate Apostolic of Central Africa along with five missionary companions. The mission went poorly; the climate was harsh and the missionaries became ill. Some died within a few months, and in 1859 Comboni himself decided to leave Africa and return home.

In Italy, Comboni devised a plan for the rebirth of Africa: convinced of the need to involve the local people in missionary activity, he thought of creating centres for welcoming, baptizing, and educating the natives so they could act as catechists among their own people. He organised conferences all over Europe to share his idea, as well as speaking with Arnold Janssen and Catholic congregations already engaged in missions in Africa.

On the occasion of Vatican Council I, Comboni prepared a document to be presented to the fathers to try to involve as many ecclesial forces in the work of propagating faith in Africa, but because of the suspension of the council, the document could not be discussed.

On 1 June 1867, Comboni decided to open a training center which conducted seminars for clerics in Verona to be used in African missions: as a reference model for the organization of the community, the Paris Foreign Missions Society was chosen as a company of priests and lay brothers, without religious vows, but with an oath of loyalty and belonging to the community. The direction and teaching in the institute were entrusted to the Jesuits.

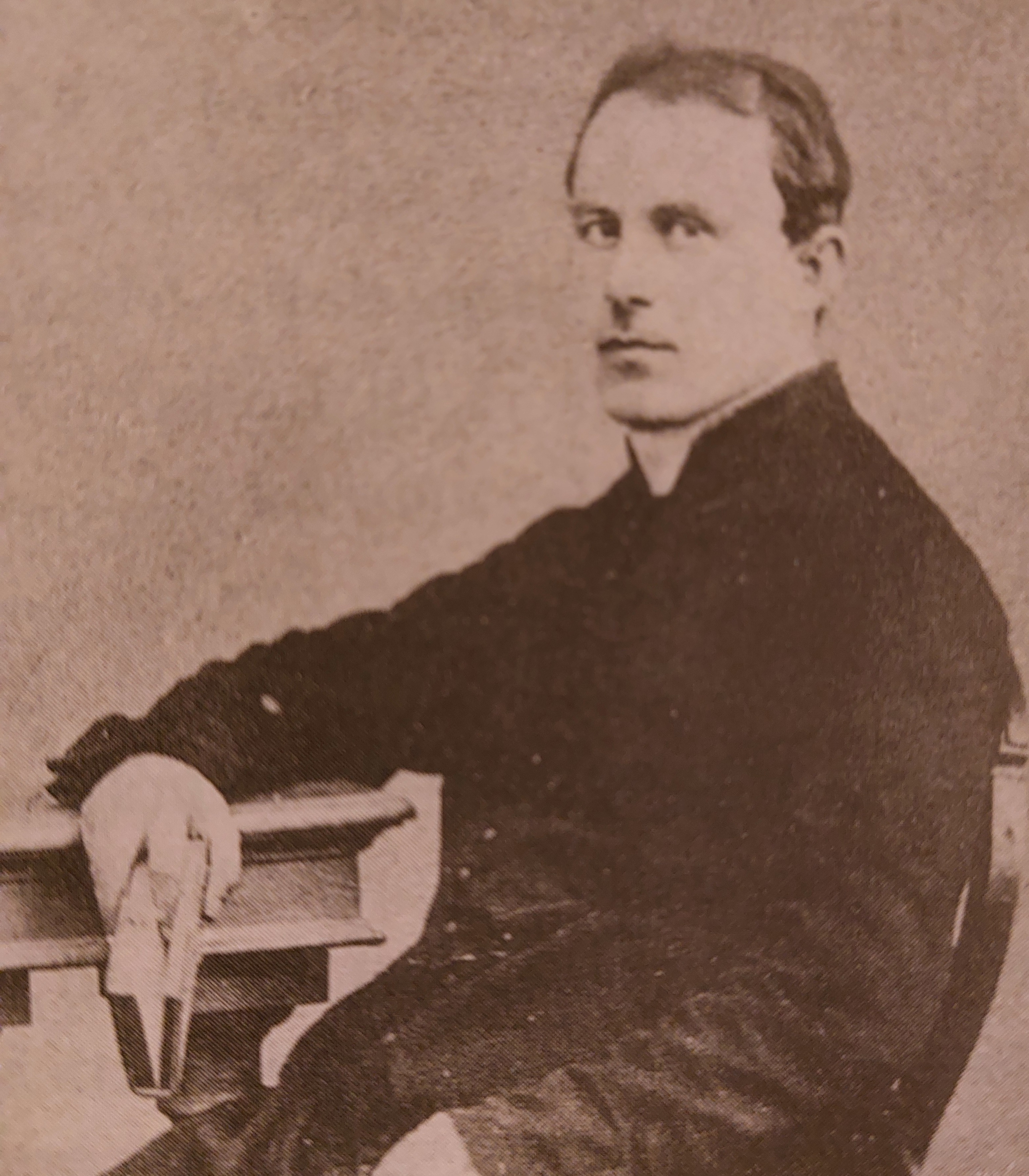
Father Giovanni Losi, successor of father Comboni in Sudan.

The missionary society, originally called the Sons of the Sacred Heart of Jesus, was approved as a congregation of diocesan right on 8 December 1871. On 31 July 1877, Comboni was named Apostolic Vicar of Central Africa and travelled to Khartoum, where he died in 1881. With the founder's death, his congregation entered a precarious phase: the Mahdist War prevented missionaries from continuing their mission to Sudan. Francesco Sogaro, Comboni's first successor, transformed the society into a congregation of simple vows in 1885, but older members did not accept the decision because they believed that religious practices would distract the missionaries from the active apostolate. Only the decision of the Sacred Congregation for the Propagation of the Faith, which approved Sogaro's choice, ended the internal conflicts of the institute.

With the Anglo-Egyptian victory over the Mahdists, the Comboni Missionaries could resume their mission to Sudan. The congregation received the Papal Decree of Praise on 7 June 1895. Since the congregation was now mature and self-sufficient, Antonio Maria Roveggio, successor to Sogaro, in 1899 took on the responsibility for formation of new missionaries from the Jesuits. On 19 February 1910, the Holy See finally approved the institute and its constitutions.

Within the congregation, two groups were soon set up: one formed by Italian religious and the other by the religious of the German-speaking countries. The conflicts between the two factions grew in the years of World War I. On 27 July 1923, the Holy See decided to separate the German branch of the institute from the parent congregation by instituting the Missionaries of the Sons of the Sacred Heart of Jesus, which were approved on 18 March 1924.

The Second Vatican Council invited all religious institutes to rediscover the charism of their founders, This led to moves encouraging the two separate congregational groups to seek the way of unity. As a result, on 2 September 1975, together in the town of Ellwangen in southern Germany, the two groups celebrated the general chapters which decided and ratified the meeting of the two institutes. On 22 June 1979, the Holy See sanctioned the union of the two congregations.

== Activity and dissemination ==
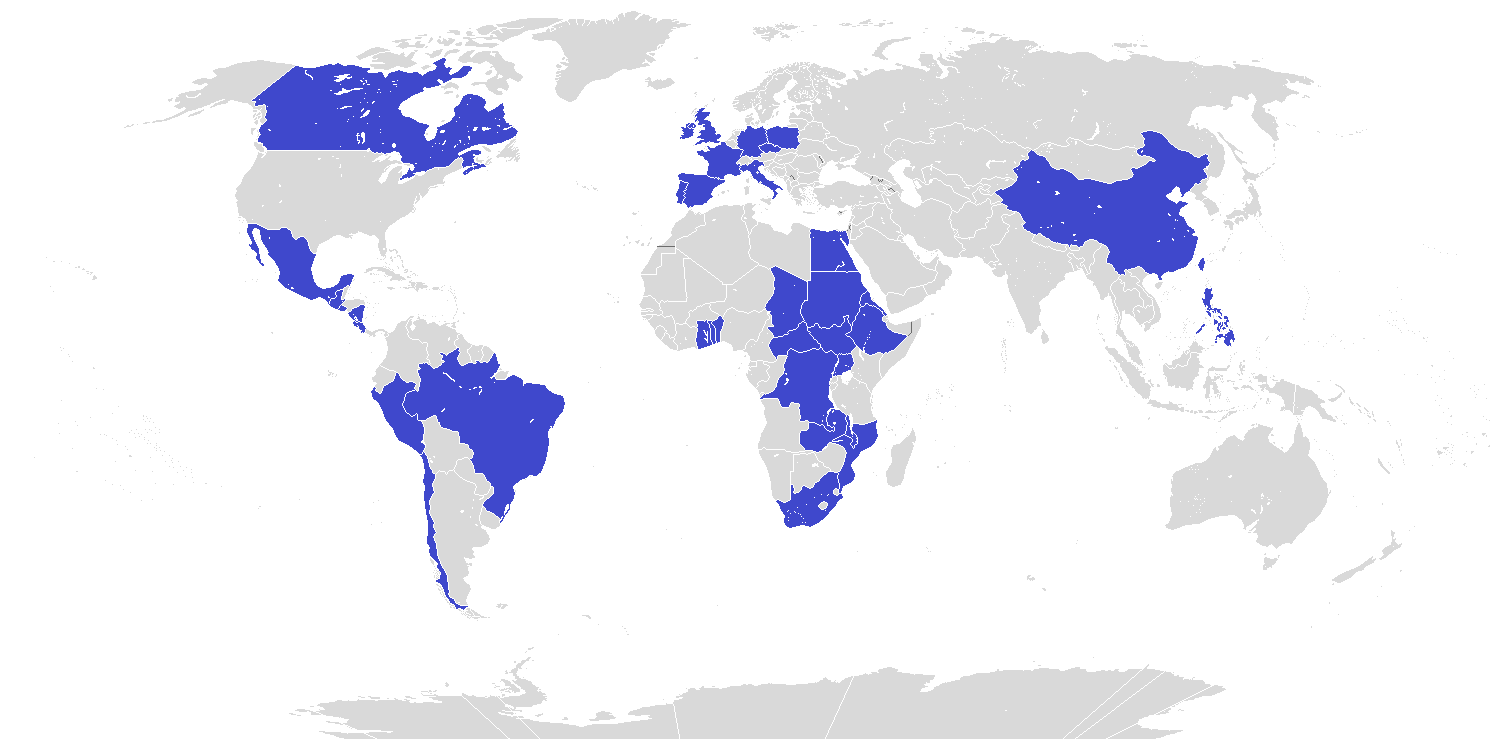
Countries where the Comboni Missionaries of the Heart of Jesus are active.

The Comboni Missionaries state that they dedicate themselves to the missionary apostolate among populations which are not yet, or not sufficiently, evangelised, especially in Africa.

They are present in Europe (Austria, France, Germany, Ireland, Italy, Poland, Portugal, United Kingdom, Spain), Africa (Benin, Central African Republic, Chad, Democratic Republic of Congo, Ghana, Egypt, Eritrea, Ethiopia, Malawi, Mozambique, South Africa, South Sudan, Sudan, Togo, Uganda, Zambia), in the Americas (Brazil, Canada, Chile, Costa Rica, Ecuador, El Salvador, Guatemala, Mexico, Nicaragua, Peru), and in Asia (Philippines, Macao, Taiwan). The Mother House is in Via Luigi Lilio in Rome.

At the end of 2020, the congregation had 272 houses with 1,576 religious, 1,103 of whom were priests. The congregation is led by a Superior General.

== Sexual abuse ==
Eleven men have alleged that members of the order sexually abused them during the 1960s and 1970s when they were boys at a Comboni Missionaries minor seminary, St Peter Claver College, in Mirfield, England. One of those abused, Mark Murray, set up a blog to encourage further testimonies; eventually the Comboni Survivors' Group formed. Four abusers were named in the men's statements. In 2014, the order paid a total of £120,000 to the men, while saying "All the claims were made on a purely commercial basis and with no admission of liability". In May 2015, the accusers sent a 157-page report including over 1,000 allegations of abuse over several decades to the archbishops of Britain and Ireland, calling on the Comboni Missionaries to acknowledge the alleged abuse and apologise. The Independent Inquiry into Child Sexual Abuse in England and Wales reported in November 2020 that the Comboni order had repeatedly understated and minimized occurrences of child sexual abuse.

On 21 and 22 March 2023 people who had been abused as teenagers in the 1960s and 1970s at Mirfield met in Rome with Pope Francis and leaders of the Comboni Missionary order. In 2014 the order had questioned victims' accounts and refused to meet them; in the 2023 meeting the survivors said that the Comboni leadership now listened to them and believed them, "a transformative experience". In a joint statement the Comboni Missionaries apologised for past abuses, said they were "truly sorry for the times we have not responded adequately", and asked "once again for forgiveness". The pope said that the missionaries "needed to own their shame" and that "the devil must have got into the order". A further meeting was held in London from 28 June to 3 July 2023 between the Survivors' Group, and the Comboni Superior General and Vicar General.

In May 2025 an icon for abuse survivors was installed in Leeds Cathedral, "the first memorial of its kind installed within a Catholic cathedral", and blessed by Bishop of Leeds Marcus Stock at a liturgy for the Comboni Survivors' Group.

== Comboni Family ==
Collectively, the priests, sisters, and lay people engaged in the work of the institutes's apostolate are known as the Comboni Family. The Comboni Family holds an annual meeting and also undertakes work related to integral ecology. A Comboni Family Integral Ecology Forum was held in Belém, in Brazil, alongside the 2025 United Nations Climate Change Conference (COP30: 10–21 November 2025).

== See also ==
- Comboni Missionary Sisters
- Apostles of Jesus
- Caravan of Peace
- The White Fathers Mission in Uganda

== Bibliography ==
- Annuario pontificio per l'anno 2010 [Pontifical directory for the year 2010] (in Italian). Vatican City: Libreria Editrice Vaticana. 2010. ISBN 978-8-82098-355-0.
- Agostoni, T. (1953). Escobar, Mario (ed.). Ordini e congregazioni religiose [Orders and religious congregations] (in Italian). Vol. 2. Turin: Società Editrice Internazionale.
- Gilli, A., ed. (1976). Dizionario degli Istituti di Perfezione (in Italian). Vol. III. Milan, Italy: Edizioni Paoline.
- Rocca, Giancarlo, ed. (1978). Dizionario degli Istituti di Perfezione (in Italian). Vol. V. Milan, Italy: Edizioni Paoline.
- Bertolotti, A. (1997). Schwaiger, Georg (ed.). La vita religiosa dalle origini ai nostri giorni [Religious Life from Origins to Today] (in Italian). Milan, Italy: San Paolo. ISBN 978-8-82153-345-7.
