= Sudan Evangelical Presbyterian Church =

Church in Sudan

Sudan Evangelical Presbyterian Church (SEPC) was started by American missionaries of the Presbyterian Church in the USA in the northern part of Sudan. Missionaries were expelled in 1964. The SEPC has grown since then in northern and western Sudan as well as in southern Sudan, after a large percentage of SEPC members moved there in anticipation of forming the new country of The Republic of South Sudan in 2011. Some members have remained in Sudan.

In 2023, the Sudan Evangelical Presbyterian Church is under the leadership of Bishop Elias Taban, and is working to plant churches in northern Sudan as well as South Sudan.

The church affirms the Apostles Creed, the Westminster Confession of Faith, and the Nicene Creed. Its partner church is the Reformed Church in America.

South Sudan is also home to the Sudan Presbyterian Evangelical Church (SPEC/ SSPEC). This is led by Rabat Obid.
