= Yaba Angelosi =

American drummer

- Born: Angelo Maku; South Sudan
- Origin: American-South Sudanese artist
- Genres: Afro-pop
- Occupations: Singer, songwriter, record producer, film director
- Instruments: Vocals, guitar, bass, piano, keyboards, drums
- Years active: 2008–present
- Label: Assida Records
- Website: https://www.yabaangelosi.com

Angelo Maku better known by his stage name Yaba Angelosi is a South Sudanese American singer, songwriter, sound producer, film director, and entertainer.

== Biography ==
He is founder of Assida Records and Assida Films. He is popular in Africa and in South Sudanese diaspora in United States, Canada and Europe.

Yaba Angelosi, is the eldest child in a family of eight. He was born in a small town near Juba, South Sudan. His family immigrated to the United States in 2000 and ever since, Yaba has been working to improve his skills. In addition to vocals, he plays guitar, bass, piano and drums.

Angelosi's music mixes catchy African traditional sounds with Western dance music using modern instrumentation and arrangements. He has performed internationally including at The White House, during Sudan's Comprehensive Peace Agreement (CPA) celebrations in District of Columbia and many more. He supported the independence referendum in 2011 with a collective work "Time to Vote (Referendum)" in English and many local languages and in cooperation with a number of South Sudanese artists and personalities. A music video was launched directed by Yaba Angelosi and produced by his production company Assida Productions. Also in 2011, he released the 18-track album Survivor that included "Time to Vote" In 2012, he campaigned against bleaching trend in some African communities releasing his single "Black Is Beautiful".

== Assida Records / Assida Films / Assida Productions ==
Assida Productions, an independent production company was co-founded by Yaba Angelosi and DJ Masta-J aka Morris in 2008. Later on a record label was also developed as Assida Records starting 2011. Now the company has the following divisions: Assida Productions, Assida Films, Assida Promotions, Assida Graphics and Assida TV.

Assida Productions have produced music for many artists: produced for a number of artists including Meve Alange, Baf Jay, Slick Nick, OB MrRight, Mista D, O-Kays, Refugee Muziq, Ono-Lyrics, Habib Musica, Zaquan Sam, Sway, Tina Jibi, Adaway, John Taban, Amanie Illfated and others.

Assida Records label currently signed artist Yaba Angelosi, Baf Jay and Josephine Sebit. Previously signed artist such Meve Alange, Slick Nick, and Flow Youngin.

Assida Films have worked on many independent film projects as well as music videos for many artists: Meve Alange, Baf Jay, Slick Nick, Adaway, Sykologist, Tina Jibi, OB MrRight, V-Vesta, Lohan, and many more.

== Discography ==
=== Albums ===
- 2011: Kalam Sah

=== Songs and videos ===
(Selective)

- 2010: "Time to Vote (Referendum)" (with a number of South Sudanese artists)
- 2010: "Salamu Alaykum"
- 2010: "Shamarrat"
- 2011: "Ana Bigga Tabani"
- 2011: "Kalamet Deh Wosulu" (Dynamq feat. Queen Zee & Yaba Angelosi)
- 2012: "Habibi Taal"
- 2012: "Everybody Dance"
- 2012: "Everything You Want" (feat. Meve Alange)
- 2012: "Black Is Beautiful"
- 2013: "Faya Faya" (feat. Slick Nick)
- 2013: "Junubia"
- 2014: "Enough Is Enough"
- 2014: "So Beautiful"
- 2014: "Kaylay Kaylay" (feat. Meve Alange)
- 2015: "Maskay"
- 2015: "African Lady"
- 2015: "My Journey"
- 2016: "You & Me" (feat. Amanie Illfated)
- 2017: "I Can't Imagine"
- 2018: "Furoon" (feat. Wad Haj Yousif)
- 2018: "I'm Blessed"
- 2020: "Rabuna"
- 2020: "Muhaba" (feat. Meve Alange)
- 2020: "Madame"
- 2020: "Jayreema" (feat. Longonyo)
- 2020: "Turn It Up"
- 2020: "Happy Holidays"
- 2021: "Something About You"
