= Water is Basic =

South Sudanese non-profit organization

- Founded: 2006
- Founder: Bishop Elias Taban
- Type: Non-governmental organization
- Location: South Sudan, Irving, Texas
- Region served: South Sudan
- Website: waterisbasic.org

Water is Basic is a nonprofit organization founded in 2006 that works to improve access to reliable, sustainable clean water systems in South Sudan. The organization focuses on rehabilitating and maintaining existing water infrastructure, prioritizing locally led solutions and long-term ownership by trained local professionals.

Mission and Vision

Water is Basic’s mission is to ensure every person in South Sudan has access to clean water. By 2030, the organization aims to complete this mission by fully placing water system maintenance in local hands—bringing an end to dependence on long-term foreign aid. A central component of the organization’s philosophy is the belief that the water crisis is best solved by those most affected by it—women. It’s women who are often responsible for water collection in rural communities, spending hours a day walking for water. By equipping women with the skills and tools to maintain water systems, Water is Basic creates solutions that strengthen families, communities, and local economies. The organization’s long-term strategy, referred to as Vision 2030, is designed to bring Water is Basic’s 25-year mission to a responsible close—placing full ownership and maintenance of water systems in local hands by 2030.

History and Leadership

In its early years, Water is Basic focused primarily on drilling new water wells in rural communities. By the early 2010s, the organization had constructed more than 800 wells, providing clean water access to hundreds of thousands of people. By approximately 2014, the organization identified that a large number of existing wells across South Sudan were nonfunctional due to lack of maintenance and trained repair services. Internal surveys indicated that tens of thousands of wells had been drilled nationwide by various entities, with a substantial portion inoperable at any given time. This finding prompted a strategic shift toward well rehabilitation and maintenance, emphasizing cost-effective repairs and local capacity building rather than exclusive reliance on new construction. This approach remains the organization’s primary operational focus.

The strategic shift toward well rehabilitation and locally led maintenance was shaped by the organization’s founding leadership, which combined U.S.-based organizational support with South Sudanese local leadership. Water is Basic was co-founded by Steve Roese and Bishop Elias Taban. Steve Roese, the organization’s founder and president, became involved in 2006 during meetings in Entebbe, Uganda, where South Sudanese religious and civic leaders identified access to clean water as a priority need. Although often identified as the founder of the U.S. 501(c)(3) entity, Roese has stated that the organization originated from the vision of local South Sudanese leaders and that his role was to connect those leaders with resources in the United States. Under Roese’s leadership, the organization implemented the shift toward well rehabilitation and maintenance and later advanced its long-term sustainability strategy, Vision 2030. Bishop Elias Taban is a South Sudanese religious leader and peace advocate who served as a co-founder and early co-leader of Water is Basic. In 2013, he received the Clinton Global Initiative Global Citizen Award in recognition of his work in peacebuilding and community development in South Sudan. Operations

Water is Basic operates as a U.S.-based nonprofit organization that provides strategic direction, fundraising, and program oversight, while implementation in South Sudan is carried out through its national partner organization, the Women’s Empowerment Solutions Initiative (WESI). This partnership model is designed to transfer long-term ownership of water infrastructure from international organizations to locally led systems. The primary operational program is the Women’s Well Repair Initiative, under which WESI trains South Sudanese women as professional well-repair mechanics and supports them in operating independent repair businesses within their communities. Training includes hand-pump repair, spare-parts management, and basic business skills, enabling teams to provide rapid maintenance services without reliance on foreign technicians or emergency aid. As part of Vision 2030, WESI is responsible for scaling this model nationwide, expanding from a limited number of teams to 256 women-led well repair mechanics operating across all 10 states of South Sudan. The objective is to establish a fully self-sustaining system in which every community has access to trained local professionals, reducing repair timelines so that when a well breaks, water access can be restored within days rather than months or years. Since the launch of the Women’s Well Repair Initiative, women-led teams supported through the Water is Basic–WESI partnership have repaired more than 1,600 wells, restoring reliable clean water access for an estimated 800,000 people. Repairs are reported to cost a fraction of new well construction, making rehabilitation a central component of the organization’s sustainability strategy. Through this operating model, Water is Basic and WESI emphasize locally led solutions that are built to last. Women become trained well mechanics who repair local water systems and run small businesses in their communities. This approach not only restores reliable water access at the community level but also empowers women to actively lead and strengthen their communities. According to the organization, this approach reflects its stated goal: “We’re not building a nonprofit—we’re eliminating the need for one.”
