= Telephone numbers in South Sudan =

- Country: South Sudan
- Continent: Africa
- Country code: +211
- International access: 00

South Sudan uses a two digit mobile code along with a seven digit phone number. For international calls, South Sudan has been assigned the +211 code by the International Telecommunication Union.

Before the secession in 2011, the area, later to be known as South Sudan, used Sudan's country-level calling code. After its secession as an independent state on 9 July 2011, South Sudan continued to use the country-level calling code of Sudan +249 until 1 October 2011. The United Nations recognized South Sudan on 14 July 2011, and in so the United Nations suggested the country-level calling code to become active by 16 July 2011. The calling code went "live" on 1 October 2011.

== Service Provider codes ==
Each telephone service provider has a two-digit identifier. The first digit is 1 for fixed services, including wireline and fixed wireless, or 9 for GSM mobile services.

Fixed Services Provider	Identifier	Status
Sudani (fixed CDMA wireless)	12	active
Sudani (fixed landlines)	18	active
Vivacel (NOW)	16	not yet operational
Gemtel (Green Network)	17	not yet operational
Government Reserve	19	not yet operational

Mobile Service Provider	Identifier	Status
ZAIN (South Sudan)	91	active
MTN (South Sudan)	92	active
Vivacel (NOW)	95	inactive
Gemtel (Green Network)	97	inactive
Digitel	98	active

== National calls ==
Calls taking place inside of South Sudan have a simple format of mm nnn nnnn (where mm represents the mobile code and nnn nnnn represents the local number). An ITU is not required for national calls. For example, a person in South Sudan contacting another person in the same country with a mobile code of 55 and a local number of 555-5555 would have a telephone number of 55 555 5555.

== International calls ==
=== Inbound ===
Calls from outside South Sudan require a different dialing format to be used. International call prefixes, area codes, and phone numbers may vary. An inbound call has the format of +211 mm nnn nnnn (where mm represents the mobile code, and nnn nnnn represents the local number). The + represents the international call prefix used by the country where the call originates: for example, the United States and Canada use 011, and most other countries use 00. So for example, if someone from tried to call to the number 55-555-5555 in South Sudan from the United States, then one would use 011 211 55 555 5555.

== See also ==
- Telecommunications in South Sudan
