= Elias Taban =

Sudanese activist and civil engineer (born 1955)

Bishop Elias Taban (born May 10, 1955) is founder of the Evangelical Presbyterian Church of Sudan and the non-profit Water is Basic. A former child soldier, Taban holds a diploma in civil engineering and an advanced diploma in theology. He served as a colonel in the Sudan People's Liberation Army (SPLA) during the second civil war before becoming an advocate for peace who is widely respected by the governments of Sudan and South Sudan. His ministry has focused on building wells, orphanages, schools, and health clinics, as well as advocating for the Arms Trade Treaty. Since 2003, Taban has served as the president of the Sudan Evangelical Alliance.

== Early life ==
Taban spent the first 40 years of his life in war. On the day he was born, a massacre in his hometown of Yei forced his mother to flee into the jungle where she hid with her newborn for the first three days of his life. From the ages of 8 to 13 he was forced to serve as a child soldier in Sudan's first civil war until his family helped him escape to Uganda. While in Uganda and as a soldier in the second war, Bishop was condemned to death; he was released upon the word of a ranking official that he'd led to Christ. Taban went on to earn a degree in civil engineering and an advanced degree in theology. During Sudan's second civil war, he served as a colonel in the SPLA and founded the army's chaplain's corp. In 1990 Taban founded the Presbyterian Church in his province and was elected the national bishop of the Evangelical Presbyterian Church in 2003. He was also elected president of the Sudanese Evangelical Alliance in 2004, a position he still holds.

Taban is married to Annegrace Taban, who served as a captain in the Sudan People's Liberation Army (SPLA). She holds a degree in theology and heads the Christian Women's Empowerment Program, the largest women's church organization in South Sudan. The pair live in Yei with their five adopted children.

== Ministries ==
One of Taban's ministries, Water is Basic, was born out of a 2006 peace conference between pastors from Sudan and South Sudan. Access to clean water is one of the major challenges facing South Sudan and threatening its stability. Most water extracted from local rivers host parasites and other diseases, which results in widespread illness among local populations. Water is Basic has built nearly 500 wells across South Sudan since 2008 providing clean water to approximately 10% of the population. The non-profit operates through a sustainable model that requires local communities to finance the repair and maintenance of the wells and creates jobs by hiring local Sudanese workers. Proceeds from the wells fund job training businesses, orphanages, health clinics, and schools throughout the country.

Taban, with American Evangelical support, has helped establish close to 200 churches and two orphanages in southern Sudan. He is the Sudan Project Director of Basic Ministries International, an Evangelical organization that has started churches across South Sudan and has drilled more than 400 water wells in communities. Taban has also delivered humanitarian relief to Jonglei state, an area where intertribal conflict has displaced hundreds of thousands of people over the past years. He has built a small hospital there and has set up livelihood projects in communities from all of the groups to help address poverty. Another ministry in Sudan, His Voice Global, works to house and educate orphans in the region.

In an effort to make that ministry financially independent and operationally successful, Taban was an instrumental part of the establishment of Lion of Judah Trucking Company, which now completely supports three orphanages financially. As of 2010, the trucking company has been able to keep them self-sustained.

Taban is also a leader in the ongoing peace process in Jonglei state between warring ethnic groups. Despite his strong Christian faith, he encourages reconciliation and cooperation among people of all religions, saying: "For people to move away from violence, people need to see beyond religious differences.".

== Broker for peace ==
In 2012, United States Secretary of State Hillary Clinton met with Taban as part of a trip to urge Sudan and South Sudan to resolve an oil dispute that threatened to undermine existing peace agreements. He was a prominent public voice urging South Sudan to resume oil exports to the north and brokering peace between the two governments. Taban was also a strong advocate for Arms Trade Treaty, and traveled to New York for its final negotiations at the UN before its successful adoption. There, he was invited to address the full UN General Assembly on the need for an International Arms Trade Treaty.

In September 2013, Taban was selected to receive the Global Citizen Award by the Clinton Foundation to be presented during the Clinton Global Initiative Annual Meeting in New York City. In honor of receiving the award, he sat down for an interview with David Brody of the Christian Broadcasting Network. Then, after the ceremony, Taban sat down with Secretary Clinton for an interview. He was honored for his vision and leadership in addressing global problems, which range in scope from the Arms Trade Treaty to access to clean water in Sudan to work with orphanages. He is praised as a respected broker for peace in both North and South Sudan.
