= South Sudan =

Country in East Africa

Republic of South Sudan
- Flag Coat of arms
- Motto: "Justice, Liberty, Prosperity"
- Anthem: "South Sudan, Oyee!"
- Location of the Republic of South Sudan Territory claimed but not controlled (Kafia Kingi, Ilemi Triangle) The Abyei Special Administrative Area
- Capital and largest city: Juba; 04°51′N 31°34′E
- Official languages: English
- Recognised national languages: Dinka; Nuer; Bari; Murle; Luo (Anyuak, Acholi, Shilluk, Pari, Jur-Luo, others); Ma'di; Otuho; Zande; and around 60 other languages (Note: The Transitional Constitution of the Republic of South Sudan, Part One, 6(1): "All indigenous languages of South Sudan are national languages and shall be respected, developed and promoted".)
- Spoken languages: Dinka; Bari; Juba Arabic; Nuer; Zande; Jur (Luo); Murle; Shilluk; various others
- Religion (2020): 60.5% Christianity; 32.9% traditional faiths; 6.2% Islam; 0.4% others / none
- Demonym: South Sudanese
- Government: Federal presidential republic under a provisional government
  - President: Salva Kiir
  - First Vice-President: Vacant
- Legislature: Transitional National Legislature

Independence from Sudan
  - 1st autonomous region: 28 February 1972
  - 2nd autonomous region: 9 July 2005
  - Declared and recognised: 9 July 2011

Area
  - Total: 644,329 km^{2} (248,777 sq mi) (41st)

Population
  - 2024 estimate: ▲12,703,714 (80th)
  - Density: 19/km^{2} (49.2/sq mi) (211th)
- GDP (PPP): 2025 estimate
  - Total: ▲$15.160 billion (157th)
  - Per capita: ▲$953 (191st)
- GDP (nominal): 2025 estimate
  - Total: ▲$4.980 billion (164th)
  - Per capita: ▲$313 (194th)
- Gini (2016): ▼44.1 medium inequality
- HDI (2023): ▲0.388 low (193rd)
- Currency: South Sudanese pound (SSP)
- Time zone: UTC+2 (CAT)
- Calling code: +211
- ISO 3166 code: SS
- Internet TLD: .ss (Note: Registered and operational since 2019)

South Sudan (/suːˈdɑːn, -ˈdæn/), officially the Republic of South Sudan (RoSS), is a landlocked country in East Africa. It is bordered by Sudan to the north, Ethiopia to the east, Kenya to the southeast, Uganda to the south, the Democratic Republic of the Congo to the southwest, and the Central African Republic to the west. South Sudan's diverse landscape includes vast plains and plateaus, dry and tropical savannahs, inland floodplains, and forested mountains. The Nile River system is the defining physical feature of the country, running south to north across its centre, which is dominated by a large swamp known as the Sudd. South Sudan has an estimated population of just over 12.7 million in 2024. Juba is the capital and largest city.

Sudan was occupied by Egypt under the Muhammad Ali dynasty in the 1800s and governed as an Anglo-Egyptian condominium from 1899 until Sudanese independence in 1956. Following the First Sudanese Civil War, the Southern Sudan Autonomous Region was formed in 1972 and lasted until 1983. The Second Sudanese Civil War broke out in 1983 and ended in 2005 with the Comprehensive Peace Agreement. Later that year, southern autonomy was restored when an Autonomous Government of Southern Sudan was formed.

South Sudan became an independent state on 9 July 2011, following 98.8% support for independence in a January 2011 referendum. It is the most recent sovereign state with widespread recognition as of 2026. South Sudan descended into the South Sudanese Civil War from 2013 to 2018, enduring rampant human rights abuses, including forced displacement, ethnic massacres, and killings of journalists by various parties. It has since been governed by a coalition formed by leaders of the former warring factions, Salva Kiir (Sudan People's Liberation Movement or SPLM) and Riek Machar (Sudan People's Liberation Movement-in-Opposition or SPLM-IO). The country continues to recover from the war while experiencing ongoing and systemic ethnic violence.

The South Sudanese population is composed mostly of Nilotic peoples spanning a variety of ethnic and linguistic groups. It is demographically among the youngest nations in the world, with roughly half its people under 18 years old. The majority of inhabitants adhere to Christianity or various traditional indigenous faiths, with a sizeable Muslim minority. South Sudan is a member of the United Nations, African Union, East African Community, and the Intergovernmental Authority on Development. It is one of the least developed countries in the world, ranking the lowest in the Human Development Index. The South Sudanese economy has historically produced the world's lowest nominal GDP per capita.

== Etymology ==
The name Sudan is a name given to a geographical region to the south of the Sahara, stretching from Western Africa to eastern Central Africa. The name derives from the Arabic bilād as-sūdān (بلاد السودان), or the "Land of the Blacks". The term was first used by Arab traders, historians and geographers.

== History ==
The Nilotic people of South Sudan—the Dinka, Anyuak, Bari, Acholi, Nuer, Shilluk, Kaligi (Arabic Feroghe), and others—first entered South Sudan sometime before the tenth century. From the 15th to the 19th century, tribal migrations, largely from the area of Bahr el Ghazal, brought the Anyuak, Dinka, Nuer, and Shilluk to their modern locations in Bahr El Ghazal and the Upper Nile Region, while the Acholi and Bari settled in Equatoria. The Zande, Mundu, Avukaya and Baka, who entered South Sudan in the 16th century, established the region's largest state of Equatoria Region.

Of South Sudan's ethnic groups the Dinka are the largest, the Nuer the second-largest, the Azande the third-largest, and the Bari the fourth-largest. They are found in the Maridi, Yambio, and Tombura districts in the tropical rainforest belt of Western Equatoria, the Adio of Azande client in Yei, Central Equatoria, and Western Bahr el Ghazal. In the 18th century, the Avungara sib rose to power over the rest of Azande society, a domination that continued into the 20th century. British policies favouring Christian missionaries, such as the Closed District Ordinance of 1922 (see History of Anglo-Egyptian Sudan), and geographical barriers such as the swamplands along the White Nile curtailed the spread of Islam to the south, thus allowing the southern tribes to retain much of their political and religious institutions.

British colonial policy in Sudan had a long history of emphasising the development of the Arabised north and largely ignoring the non-Arabised south, which lacked schools, hospitals, roads, bridges, and other basic infrastructure. After Sudan's first independent elections in 1958, the continued neglect of the southern region by the Khartoum government led to uprisings, revolts, and the longest civil war on the continent. People affected by the violence included the Dinka, Nuer, Shilluk, Anyuak, Murle, Bari, Mundari, Baka, Balanda Bviri, Boya, Didinga, Jiye, Kakwa, Kaligi, Kuku, Lotuka, Nilotic, Toposa, and Zande.

The Azande/Zande have had good relations with their neighbours, namely the Moru, Mundu, Pöjulu, Avukaya, Baka, and the small groups in Bahr el Ghazal, due to the expansionist policy of their king Gbudwe, in the 18th century. In the 19th century, the Azande fought the French, the Belgians and the Mahdists to maintain their independence. Ottoman Egypt, under the rule of Khedive Ismail Pasha, first attempted to control the region in the 1870s, establishing the province of Equatoria in the southern portion. Egypt's first appointed governor was Samuel Baker, commissioned in 1869, followed by Charles George Gordon in 1874, and by Emin Pasha in 1878.

The Mahdist Revolt of the 1880s destabilised the nascent province, and Equatoria ceased to exist as an Egyptian outpost in 1889. Important settlements in Equatoria included Lado, Gondokoro, Dufile, and Wadelai. European colonial manoeuvrings in the region came to a head in 1898, when the Fashoda Incident occurred at present-day Kodok; Britain and France almost went to war over the region. Britain then treated South Sudan as a distinct entity with a different stage of development than the North. This policy was legalised in 1930 by the announcement of the Southern Policy. In 1946, without consulting Southern opinion, the British administration reversed its Southern Policy and began instead to implement a policy of uniting the North and the South.

The region has been negatively affected by two civil wars since Sudanese independence: from 1955 to 1972, the Sudanese government fought the Anyanya rebel army (Anya-Nya is a term in the Madi language which means "snake venom") during the First Sudanese Civil War, followed by the Sudan People's Liberation Army/Movement (SPLA/M) in the Second Sudanese Civil War for over twenty years, from 1983 to 2005. As a result, the country suffered serious neglect, a lack of infrastructure development, and major destruction and displacement. More than 2.5 million people have been killed, and millions more have become refugees both within and outside the country.

South Sudan has an estimated population of 12.7 million people in 2024, but, given the lack of a census in several decades, this estimate may be inaccurate. The economy is predominantly rural and relies chiefly on subsistence farming. Around 2005, the economy began a transition from this rural dominance, and urban areas within South Sudan have seen extensive development.

=== Independence (2011) ===
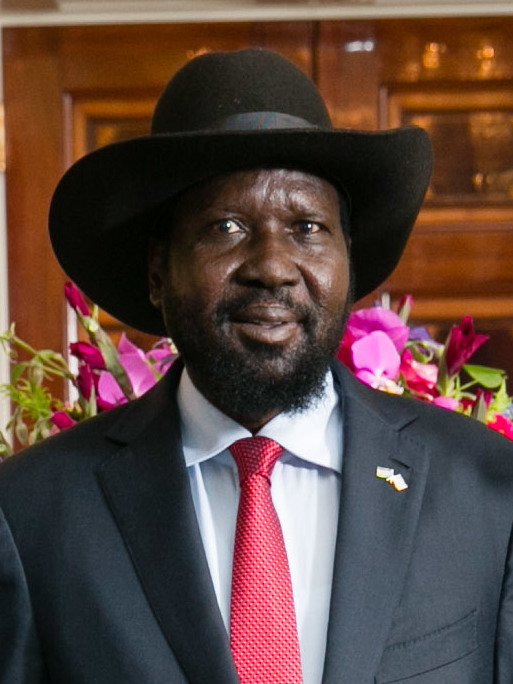
Salva Kiir, the first president of South Sudan. His trademark Stetson hat was a gift from United States President George W. Bush.

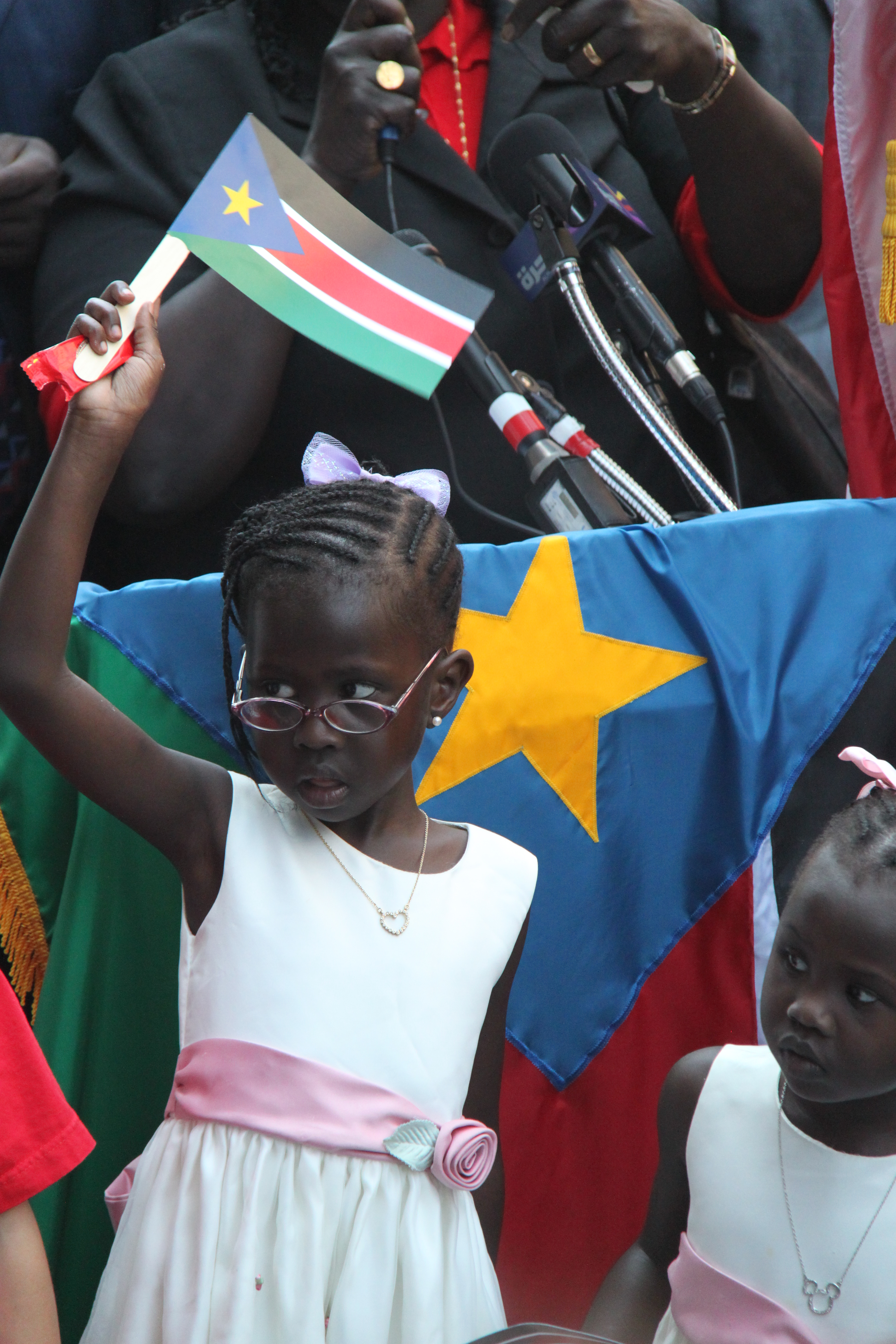
A South Sudanese girl at independence festivities

Between 9 and 15 January 2011, as a consequence of the Comprehensive Peace Agreement, the South Sudanese independence referendum was held to determine whether South Sudan should become an independent country, separate from Sudan. Following that, 98.83% of those who took part in the referendum voted for separation or independence. On 23 January 2011, a steering committee on post-independence said the land would be named the Republic of South Sudan. Other names considered were Azania, Jubanda, Nile Republic, Kush Republic and Juwama, a portmanteau for Juba, Wau and Malakal, three major cities. South Sudan formally became independent from Sudan on 9 July, although certain disputes still remained, including the division of oil revenues, as 75% of all the former Sudan's oil reserves are in South Sudan. As of March 2025, the region of Abyei still remains disputed. A separate referendum was to be held in Abyei on whether they want to join Sudan or South Sudan; however an official referendum was never held. The South Kordofan conflict broke out in June 2011 between the Army of Sudan and the SPLA over the Nuba Mountains.

On 9 July 2011, South Sudan became the 54th independent country in Africa (9 July is now celebrated as Independence Day, a national holiday) and since 14 July 2011, South Sudan is the 193rd member of the United Nations. On 27 July 2011, South Sudan became the 54th country to join the African Union. In September 2011, Google Maps recognised South Sudan as an independent country, after a massive crowdsourcing mapping initiative was launched.

In 2011 it was reported that South Sudan was at war with at least seven armed groups in 9 of its 10 states, with tens of thousands displaced. The fighters accuse the government of plotting to stay in power indefinitely, not fairly representing and supporting all tribal groups while neglecting development in rural areas. The Lord's Resistance Army (LRA) also operates in a wide area that includes South Sudan.

Inter-ethnic warfare in some cases predates the war of independence and is widespread. In December 2011, tribal clashes intensified between the Nuer White Army of the Lou Nuer and the Murle. The White Army warned it would wipe out the Murle and would also fight South Sudanese and UN forces sent to the area around Pibor.

In March 2012, South Sudanese forces seized the Heglig oil fields in lands claimed by both Sudan and South Sudan in the province of South Kordofan after conflict with Sudanese forces in the South Sudanese state of Unity. South Sudan withdrew on 20 March, and the Sudanese Army entered Heglig two days later.

=== South Sudanese Civil War (2013–2020) ===
Military situation in South Sudan on 22 March 2020 Under control of the Government of South Sudan Under control of the Sudan People's Liberation Movement-in-Opposition Under control of the Government of Sudan

On 5 September 2013, an article written by analyst Duop Chak Wuol was published by the US-based South Sudan News Agency (SSNA). The writer raised critical questions surrounding what he described as the rise of autocracy within the top leadership of the Sudan People's Liberation Movement (SPLM) and warned of monumental repercussions unless the ruling elites restored the founding principles of the party. Duop also berated the ruling party, arguing that the party has replaced its founding principles with "forgotten promises and deceptions". In December 2013, a political power struggle broke out between President Kiir and his former deputy Riek Machar, as the president accused Machar and ten others of attempting a coup d'état. Fighting broke out, igniting the South Sudanese Civil War. Ugandan troops were deployed to fight alongside South Sudanese government forces against the rebels. The United Nations has peacekeepers in the country as part of the United Nations Mission in South Sudan (UNMISS). Numerous ceasefires were mediated by the Intergovernmental Authority on Development (IGAD) between the Sudan People's Liberation Movement (SPLM) and SPLM – in opposition and were subsequently broken. A peace agreement was signed in Ethiopia under threat of United Nations sanctions for both sides in August 2015. Machar returned to Juba in 2016 and was appointed vice-president. Following a second break-out of violence in Juba, Machar was replaced as vice-president and he fled the country as the conflict erupted again. Rebel in-fighting has become a major part of the conflict. Rivalry among Dinka factions led by the President and Malong Awan has also led to fighting. In August 2018, another power-sharing agreement came into effect.

About 400,000 people are estimated to have been killed in the war, including notable atrocities such as the 2014 Bentiu massacre. Although both men have supporters from across South Sudan's ethnic divides, subsequent fighting has been communal, with rebels targeting members of Kiir's Dinka ethnic group and government soldiers attacking Nuers. More than 4 million people have been displaced, with about 1.8 million of those internally displaced, and about 2.5 million having fled to neighbouring countries, especially Uganda and Sudan.

On 20 February 2020, Salva Kiir and Riek Machar agreed to a peace deal; further, a national unity government on 22 February 2020, as Machar was sworn in as the First Vice-President of the country.

Despite the official cessation of the civil war, violence between armed militia groups at the community level has continued in the country; according to Yasmin Sooka, chair of the Commission of Human Rights in Sudan, the level of violence "far exceeds the violence between 2013 and 2019".

=== Admission into the EAC and planned democratic elections (2016–present) ===
South Sudan acceded to the Treaty of the East Africa Community on 15 April 2016 and became a full member on 15 August 2016. South Sudan, Democratic Republic of Congo and Federal Republic of Somalia are the newest members of the East African Community.

The first democratic elections in South Sudan since the start of the civil war were scheduled for 2023 by the peace agreement that ended the war officially, but the transitional government and opposition agreed in 2022 to move them to late 2024 instead. In September 2024, Kiir's office announced that the elections would be postponed an additional two years, to December 2026.

=== 2025–2026 tensions ===
In 2025, violence expanded across South Sudan as ceasefire violations and fighting between government forces and opposition groups intensified in Jonglei, Unity, and Upper Nile states. Aerial bombardments, river based operations, ambushes, and retaliatory attacks were reported. These incidents resulted in civilian casualties, displacement, and the loss of livelihoods.

In early March, clashes between the Army and the rebel Nuer White Army in the town of Nasir left dozens dead. On 26 March 2025, Vice-President Riek Machar was arrested on orders of President Salva Kiir claiming he had instigated and supported the White Army, despite the White Army denying any ties. The arrest was met by a response from the SPLM-IO stating such an act violates the ceasefire that ended the South Sudanese civil war in 2020. Machar's arrest was accompanied by the mass sacking of his supporters, and the arrival of a unit from the Ugandan armed forces invited into the country by Kiir to help fight against the White Army.

UN Secretary-General Antonio Guterres stated that the "peace agreement is in shambles" and South Sudan is on "the edge of a collapse into civil war" while the African Union has sent a delegation to try to deescalate the conflict.

At least 169 people were killed and 50 injured in March 2026 when armed youth from Unity State attacked Abiemnom County in the Ruweng Administrative Area. The attackers burned markets and homes before being driven out by the army, after which local authorities regained control. The killings form part of a growing surge in violence across South Sudan, where forces aligned with President Salva Kiir are fighting armed groups believed to support opposition leader Riek Machar.

=== 2026 elections ===
President Salva Kiir had dissolved the transitional government on 24 September 2026. Kiir will remain in office with full constitutional powers until an elected president is sworn in. He also reappointed some ministers and governors in caretaker positions until the 22 December elections.

== Geography ==
Protected areas in South Sudan

South Sudan lies between latitudes 3° and 13°N, and longitudes 24° and 36°E. It is covered in tropical forest, swamps, and grassland. The White Nile passes through the country, passing by Juba. The Sudd is formed by the White Nile, known locally as the Bahr al Jabal, meaning "Mountain Sea".

South Sudan's protected area of Bandingilo National Park hosts the second-largest wildlife migration in the world. Surveys have revealed that Boma National Park, west of the Ethiopian border, as well as the Sudd wetland and Southern National Park near the border with Congo, provided habitat for large populations of hartebeest, kob, topi, buffalo, elephants, giraffes, and lions.

South Sudan's forest reserves also provided habitat for bongo, giant forest hogs, red river hogs, forest elephants, chimpanzees, and forest monkeys. Surveys begun in 2005 by WCS in partnership with the semi-autonomous government of Southern Sudan revealed that significant, though diminished wildlife populations still exist, and that, astonishingly, the huge migration of 1.3 million antelopes in the southeast is substantially intact.

Habitats in the country include grasslands, high-altitude plateaus and escarpments, wooded and grassy savannahs, floodplains, and wetlands. Associated wildlife species include the endemic white-eared kob and Nile Lechwe, as well as elephants, giraffes, common eland, giant eland, oryx, lions, African wild dogs, cape buffalo, and topi (locally called tiang). Little is known about the white-eared kob and tiang, both types of antelope, whose migrations were legendary before the civil war. The Boma-Jonglei Landscape region encompasses Boma National Park, broad pasturelands and floodplains, Bandingilo National Park, and the Sudd, a vast area of swamp and seasonally flooded grasslands that includes the Zeraf Wildlife Reserve.

Little is known of the fungi of South Sudan. A list of fungi in Sudan was prepared by S. A. J. Tarr and published by the then Commonwealth Mycological Institute (Kew, Surrey, UK) in 1955. The list, of 383 species in 175 genera, included all fungi observed within the then boundaries of the country. Many of those records relate to what is now South Sudan. Most of the species recorded were associated with diseases of crops. The true number of species of fungi in South Sudan is probably much higher.

In 2006, President Kiir announced that his government would do everything possible to protect and propagate South Sudanese fauna and flora, and seek to reduce the effects of wildfires, waste dumping, and water pollution. The environment is threatened by the development of the economy and infrastructure. The country had a 2019 Forest Landscape Integrity Index mean score of 9.45/10, ranking it fourth globally out of 172 countries.

Several ecoregions extend across South Sudan: the East Sudanian savannah, Northern Congolian forest–savannah mosaic, Saharan flooded grasslands (Sudd), Sahelian Acacia savannah, East African montane forests, and the Northern Acacia–Commiphora bushlands and thickets.

=== Climate ===
South Sudan map of Köppen climate classification

South Sudan has a tropical climate, characterised by a rainy season of high humidity and large amounts of rainfall followed by a drier season. The temperature on average is always high with July being the coolest month with average temperatures falling between 20 and 30 °C (68 and 86 °F) and March being the warmest month with average temperatures ranging from 23 to 37 °C (73 to 98 °F).

The most rainfall is seen between May and October, but the rainy season can commence in April and extend until November. On average May is the wettest month. The season is "influenced by the annual shift of the Inter-Tropical Zone" and the shift to southerly and southwesterly winds leading to slightly lower temperatures, higher humidity, and more cloud coverage.

One study has showed that climate change is expected to increase rainfall rates over South Sudan, but there is greater uncertainty about whether the number of rainy days will increase or decrease.

=== Wildlife ===
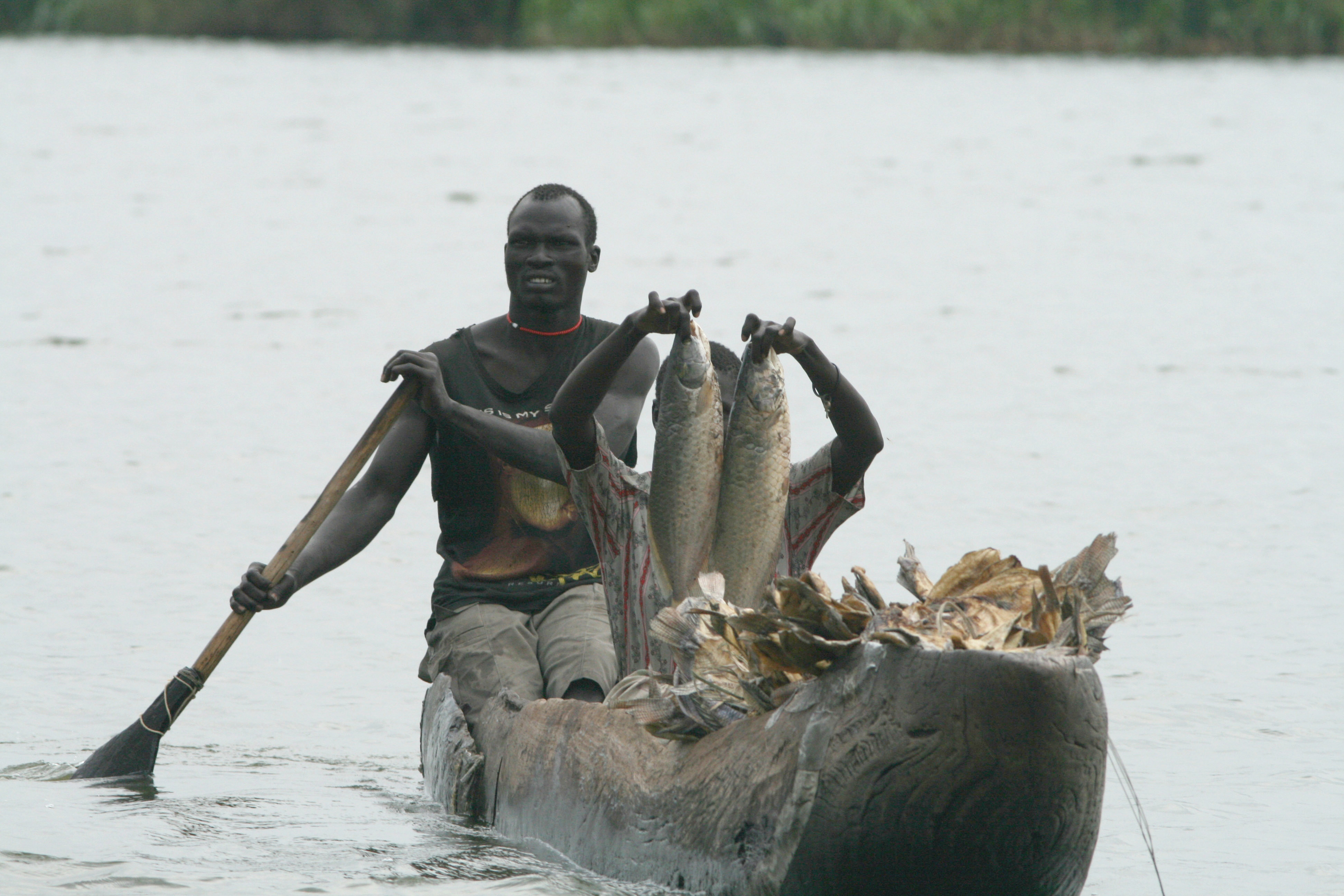
Fishing in the Sudd Wetland, one of the largest wetlands in the world

South Sudan includes the Sudd, one of the world's largest wetlands. The total area under protection is around 143,000 km^{2} (55,000 sq mi) spread over 23 protected areas which account for 15% of the South Sudanese territory. The largest protected area is the Sudd Wetland, which is an important bird life area covering 57,000 km^{2} (22,000 sq mi). It is also a Ramsar Site with over 400 bird species, 100 mammal species, and 100 fish species. Many of the protected areas are exploited for illegal hunting and rearing of livestock.

South Sudan's protected areas are in the flood plains of the Nile River. The habitat predominantly comprises grasslands, high-altitude plateaus and escarpments, wooded and grassy savannahs, floodplains and wetlands. Some of the other protected areas are the Boma National Park in the Boma-Jonglei Landscape region, an oil rich area on the eastern border with Ethiopia; the Southern National Park bordering Democratic Republic of the Congo; the Bandingilo National Park (including Mongalla)–8,400 km^{2} (3,200 sq mi); Nimule National Park–410 km^{2} (160 sq mi); and Shambe National Park, an important bird area–620 km^{2} (240 sq mi).

== Government and politics ==
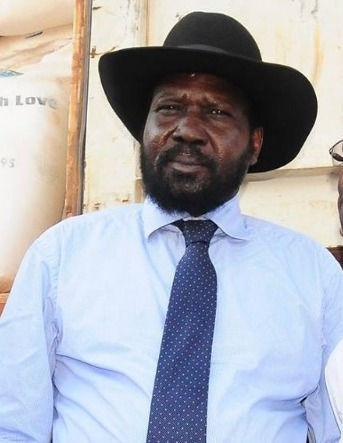
Salva Kiir
President

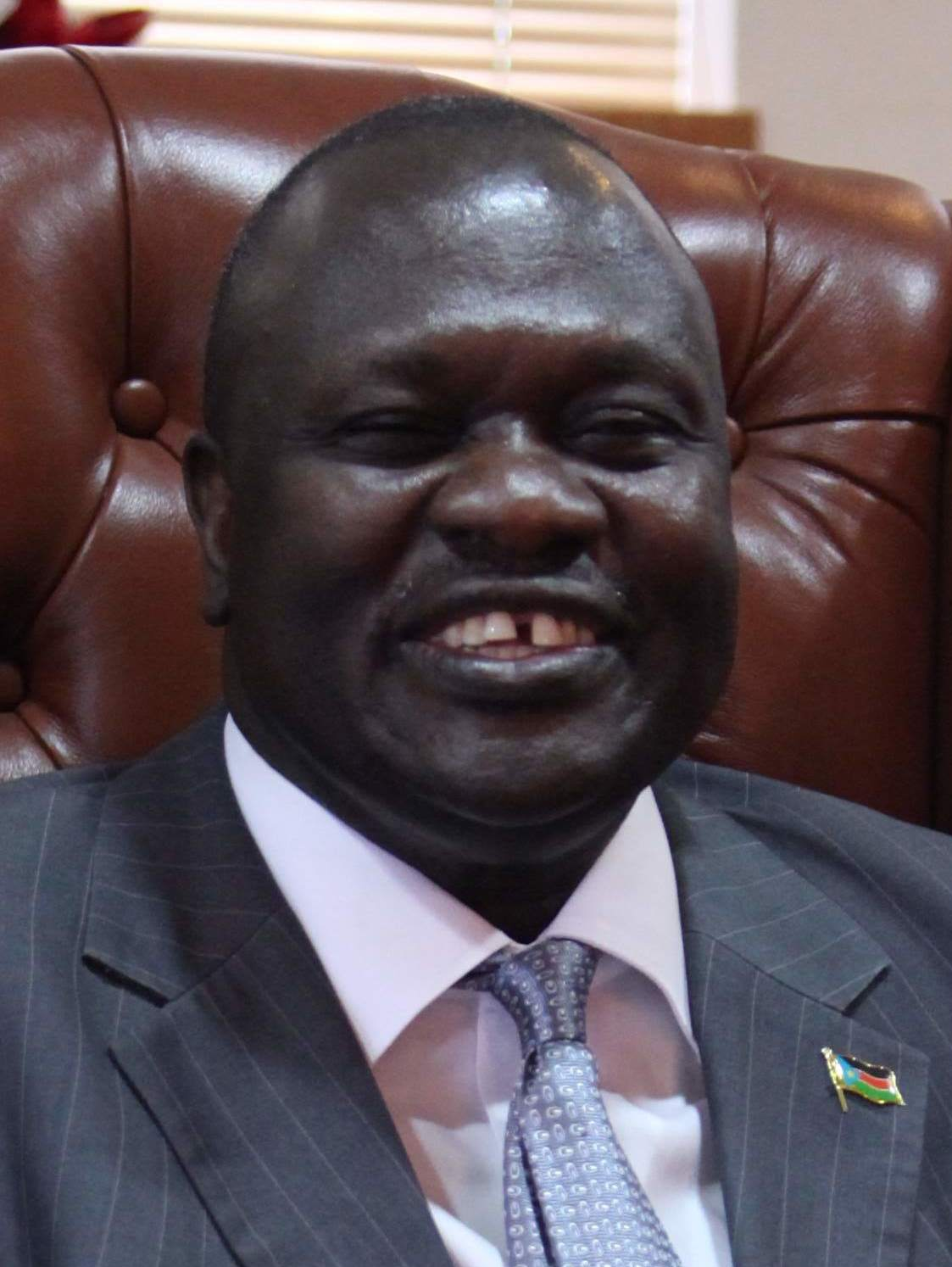
Riek Machar
First Vice President

=== Government ===
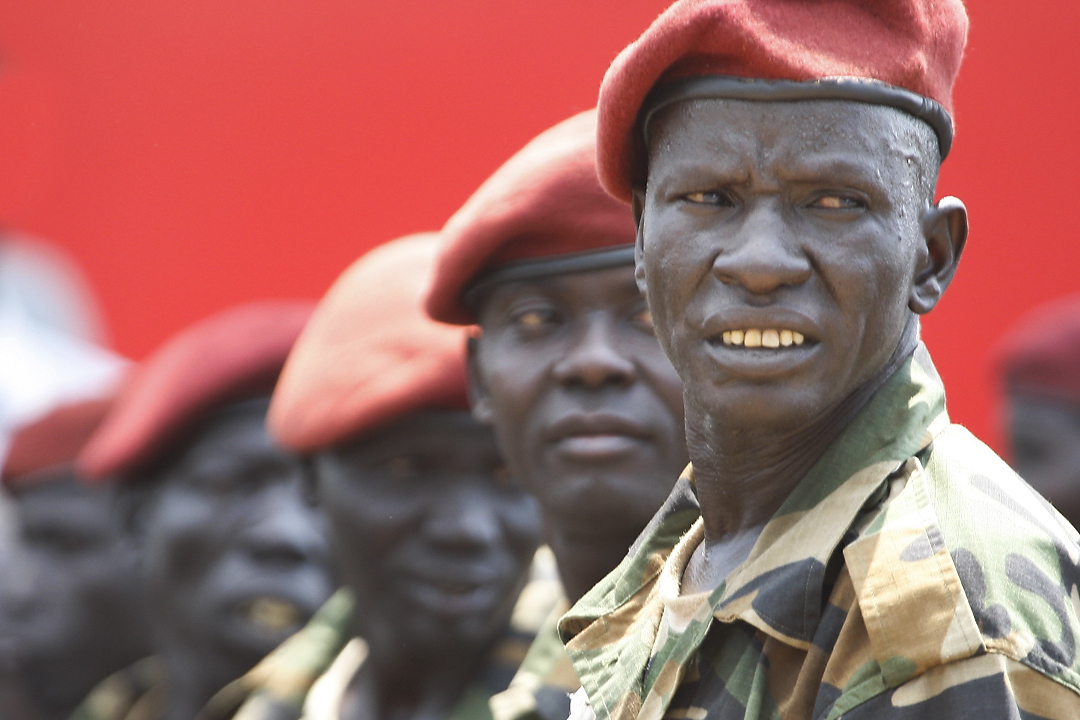
South Sudan's presidential guard on Independence Day, 2011

The now defunct Southern Sudan Legislative Assembly ratified a transitional constitution shortly before independence on 9 July 2011. The constitution was signed by the President of South Sudan, Salva Kiir, on Independence Day and thereby came into force. It is now the supreme law of the land, superseding the Interim Constitution of 2005.

The constitution establishes a presidential system of government headed by a president who is head of state, head of government, and commander-in-chief of the armed forces. It also establishes the National Legislature comprising two houses: a directly elected assembly, the National Legislative Assembly, and a second chamber of representatives of the states, the Council of States.

John Garang, one of the founders of the SPLA/M, was the president of the autonomous government until his death on 30 July 2005. Salva Kiir, his deputy, was sworn in as First Vice-President of Sudan and President of the Government of Southern Sudan on 11 August 2005. Riek Machar replaced him as Vice-President of the Government. Legislative power is vested in the government and the bicameral National Legislature. The constitution also provides for an independent judiciary, the highest organ being the Supreme court.

On 8 May 2021, South Sudanese president Salva Kiir announced a dissolution of Parliament as part of a 2018 peace deal to set up a new legislative body that will number 550 lawmakers. According to 2023 V-Dem Democracy indices South Sudan is third lowest ranked electoral democracy in Africa.

=== National capital project ===
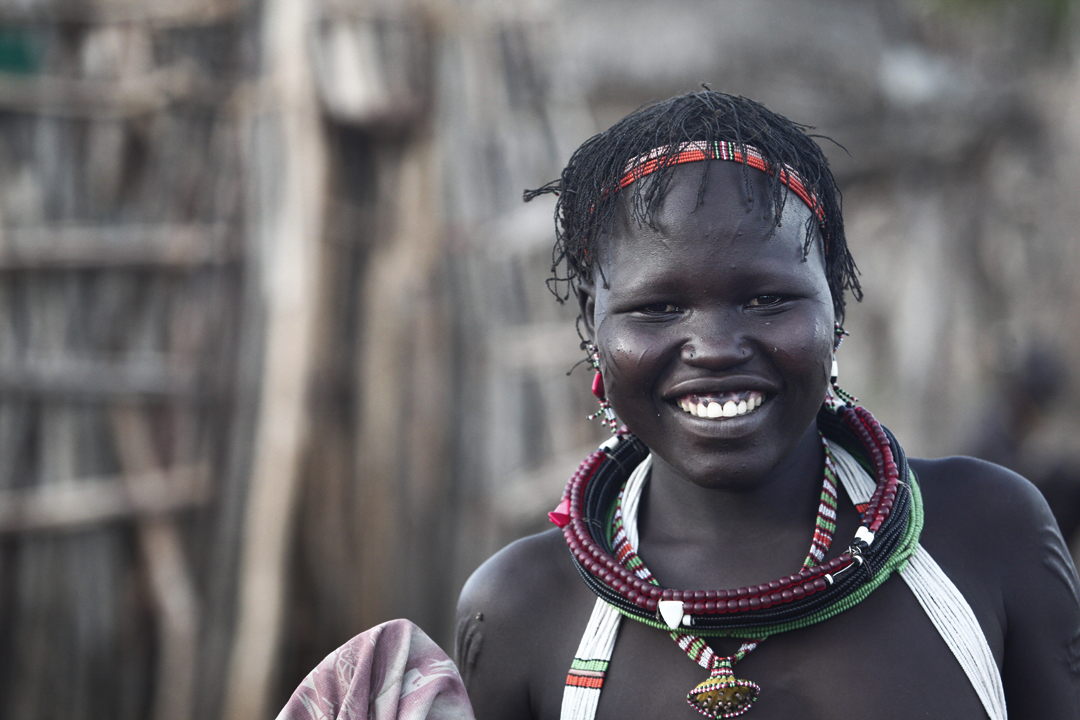
A young South Sudanese girl smiling in traditional attire

The capital of South Sudan is located at Juba, which is also the state capital of Central Equatoria and the county seat of the eponymous Juba County, and is the country's largest city. However, due to Juba's poor infrastructure and massive urban growth, as well as its lack of centrality within South Sudan, the South Sudanese Government adopted a resolution in February 2011 to study the creation of a new planned city to serve as the seat of government. It was planned that the capital city would be changed to the more centrally located Ramciel. This proposal is functionally similar to construction projects in Abuja, Nigeria; Brasília, Brazil; and Canberra, Australia; among other modern-era planned national capitals. It is unclear how the government will fund the project.

In September 2011, a spokesman for the government said the country's political leaders had accepted a proposal to build a new capital at Ramciel, a place in Lakes state near the borders with Central Equatoria and Jonglei. Ramciel is considered to be the geographical centre of the country, and the late pro-independence leader John Garang allegedly had plans to relocate the capital there before his death in 2005. The proposal was supported by the Lakes state government and at least one Ramciel tribal chief. The design, planning, and construction of the city was supposed to take as many as five years, government ministers said, and the move of national institutions to the new capital was supposed to be implemented in stages. As of 2024, the relocation project is stalled.

=== Administrative divisions ===
Administrative areas of South Sudan as of 2020

By the terms of a peace agreement signed on 22 February 2020, South Sudan is divided into ten states, with two administrative areas and one area with special administrative status.

The Kafia Kingi area is disputed between South Sudan and Sudan and the Ilemi Triangle is disputed between South Sudan and Kenya.

The states and administrative areas are once again grouped into the three former historical provinces of the Sudan; Bahr el Ghazal, Equatoria and Greater Upper Nile:

Bahr el Ghazal

- Northern Bahr el Ghazal
- Western Bahr el Ghazal
- Lakes
- Warrap

Equatoria

- Western Equatoria
- Central Equatoria (containing the national capital city of Juba)
- Eastern Equatoria

Greater Upper Nile

- Jonglei
- Unity
- Upper Nile

Administrative Areas

- Greater Pibor Administrative Area
- Ruweng Administrative Area (Rubkotna)

Special Administrative Status Areas

- Abyei Special Administrative Area

=== Foreign relations ===
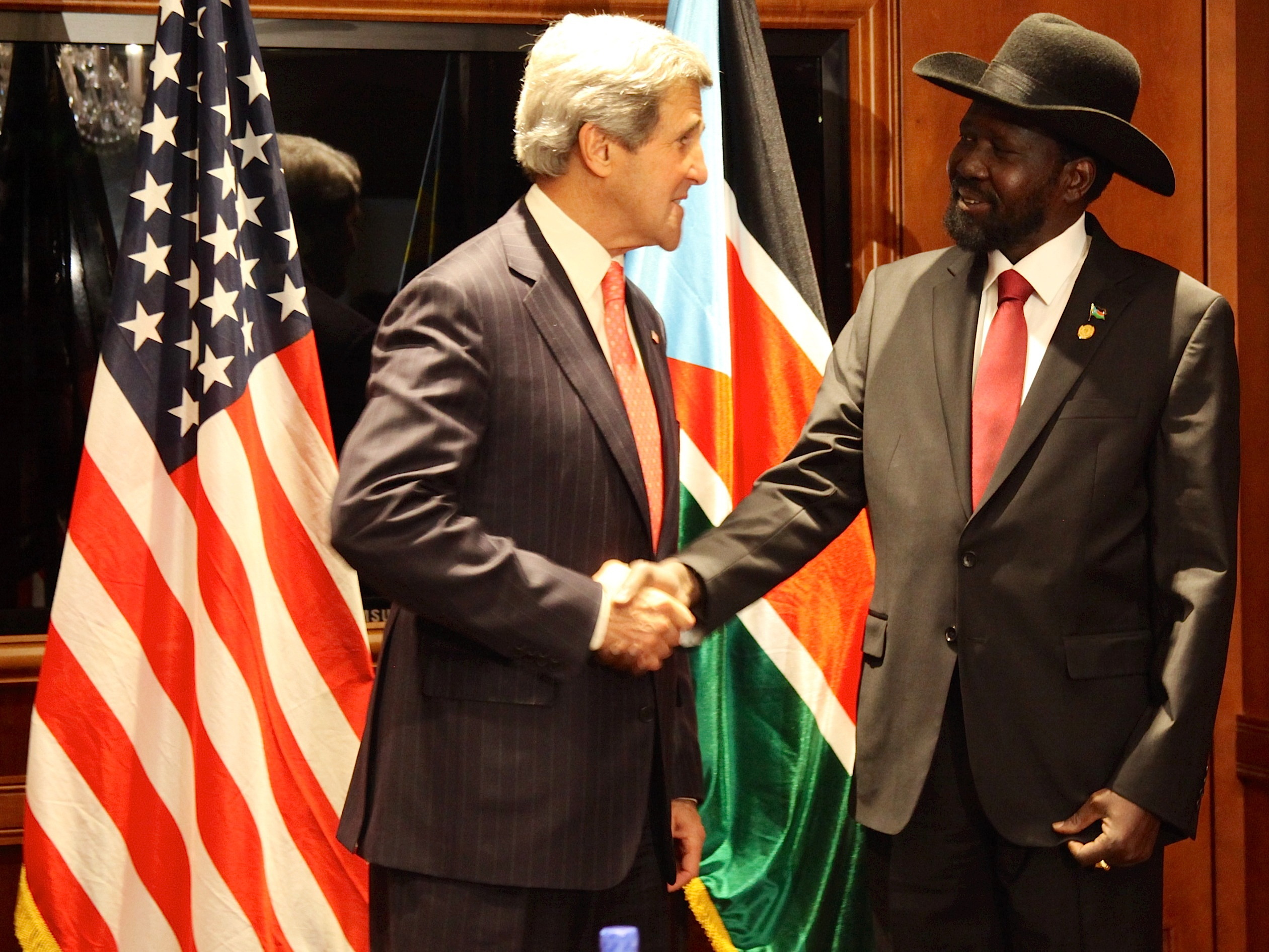
US Secretary of State John Kerry meets with President Salva Kiir, 26 May 2013.

Since independence, relations with Sudan have been changing. Sudan's President Omar al-Bashir first announced, in January 2011, that dual citizenship in the North and the South would be allowed, but upon the independence of South Sudan he retracted the offer. He has also suggested an EU-style confederation. Essam Sharaf, Prime Minister of Egypt after the 2011 Egyptian Revolution, made his first foreign visit to Khartoum and Juba in the lead-up to South Sudan's secession. Israel quickly recognised South Sudan as an independent country, and is host to thousands of refugees from South Sudan, many of whom have finally been granted temporary resident status more than a decade later. According to American sources, President Obama officially recognised the new state after Sudan, Egypt, Germany and Kenya were among the first to recognise the country's independence on 8 July 2011. Several states that participated in the international negotiations concluded with a self-determination referendum were also quick to acknowledge the overwhelming result. The Rationalist process included Kenya, Uganda, Egypt, Ethiopia, Libya, Eritrea, the United Kingdom and Norway. (Note: See table in Foreign relations of South Sudan with footnotes for early recognition countries.)

South Sudan is a member state of the United Nations, the African Union, the East African Community, and the Common Market for Eastern and Southern Africa. South Sudan plans to join the Commonwealth of Nations, the International Monetary Fund, OPEC+, and the World Bank. Some international trade organisations categorise South Sudan as part of the Greater Horn of Africa.

Full membership in the Arab League has been assured, should the country's government choose to seek it, though it could also opt for observer status. It was admitted to UNESCO on 3 November 2011. On 25 November 2011, it officially joined the Intergovernmental Authority on Development, a regional grouping of East African states.

South Sudanese President Salva Kiir with Russian President Vladimir Putin at the Russia–Africa Summit in Moscow, October 2026

The United States supported the 2011 referendum on South Sudan's independence. The New York Times reported, "South Sudan is in many ways an American creation, carved out of war-torn Sudan in a referendum largely orchestrated by the United States, its fragile institutions nurtured with billions of dollars in American aid." The US government's long-standing sanctions against Sudan were officially removed from applicability to newly independent South Sudan in December 2011, and senior RSS officials participated in a high-level international engagement conference in Washington, D.C., to help connect foreign investors with the RSS and South Sudanese private sector representatives. Given the interdependence between some sectors of the economy of the Republic of South Sudan and the Republic of Sudan, certain activities still require OFAC authorisation. Absent a licence, current Sudanese sanction regulations will continue to prohibit US persons from dealing in property and interests that benefit Sudan or the Government of Sudan. A 2011 Congressional Research Service report, "The Republic of South Sudan: Opportunities and Challenges for Africa's Newest Country", identifies outstanding political and humanitarian issues as the country forges its future.

In July 2019, UN ambassadors of 37 countries, including South Sudan, signed a joint letter to the UNHRC defending China's treatment of Uyghurs in the Xinjiang region.

The UAE lent South Sudan $12 billion for a period of 20 years. The loan agreement was signed between South Sudan and an Emirati firm owned by Hamad bin Khalifa Al Nahyan, the sources of whose wealth and investments have been suspicions during the failed takeover of Beitar Jerusalem FC. The loan deposit was directed to an Emirati bank account, of which 70% were allocated to infrastructure facilities. As per the agreement, South Sudan was to repay by the means of oil shipments, priced at $10 per barrel less than its market value. Additional oil shipments were agreed in case of decrease in oil prices. The agreement took no account of the Sudan war.

=== Military ===
A defence paper was initiated in 2007 by then Minister for SPLA Affairs Dominic Dim Deng, and a draft was produced in 2008. It declared that Southern Sudan would eventually maintain land, air, and riverine forces.

As of 2015, South Sudan has the third highest military spending as a percentage of GDP in the world, behind only Oman and Saudi Arabia.

=== Human rights ===
Campaigns of atrocities against civilians have been attributed to the SPLA. In the SPLA/M's attempt to disarm rebellions among the Shilluk and Murle, they burned scores of villages, raped hundreds of women and girls and killed an untold number of civilians. Civilians alleging torture claim fingernails being torn out, burning plastic bags dripped on children to make their parents hand over weapons, and villagers burned alive in their huts if it was suspected that rebels had spent the night there. In May 2011, the SPLA allegedly set fire to over 7,000 homes in Unity State.

In 2010, the CIA issued a warning that "over the next five years ... a new mass killing or genocide is most likely to occur in southern Sudan." The Nuer White Army has stated it wished to "wipe out the entire Murle tribe on the face of the earth as the only solution to guarantee long-term security of Nuer's cattle" and activists, including Minority Rights Group International, warned of genocide in Jonglei. At the beginning of 2017, genocide was imminent again.

Ethnic violence intensified after South Sudan's independence, as unresolved grievances, weak governance, and political rivalry contributed to growing instability. After fighting broke out in December 2013, armed groups attacked civilians on ethnic grounds.

Peter Abdul Rahaman Sule, the leader of the key opposition group United Democratic Forum, has been under arrest since 3 November 2011 over allegations linking him to the formation of a new rebel group fighting against the government.

Recruitment of child soldiers has also been cited as a serious problem in the country. In April 2014, Navi Pillay, then the UN High Commissioner for Human Rights, stated that more than 9,000 child soldiers had been fighting in South Sudan's civil war.

In March 2016, the UN reported that the South Sudan Army was being paid not in money but with a "do what you can and take what you can" policy that allowed them to confiscate cattle and other possessions, and even to rape and murder civilian women as a form of salary. The report described all sides but especially the South Sudan government SPLA forces and allied militia making targeted attacks on civilians based on ethnicity, systematically destroying towns and villages.

On 22 December 2017, at the conclusion of a 12-day visit to the region, the Commission on Human Rights in South Sudan said, "Four years following the start of the current conflict in South Sudan, gross human rights violations continue to be committed in a widespread way by all parties to the conflict, in which civilians are bearing the brunt." The Commission on Human Rights in South Sudan was established by the Human Rights Council in March 2016.

Violence against women is common in the country, and South Sudan's laws and policies have been criticised as inadequate in offering protection.

Homosexual acts are illegal.

==== Child marriage ====
In 2010, the child marriage rate in southern Sudan was 52%. (Note: Source is from 2010, before South Sudan became an independent country. However, as late as July 2025, these estimates are still used, for instance in this article: www.researchgate.net/publication/395602141_Child_Marriage_and_Its_Legal_and_Cultural_Implications_In_South_Sudan) It is driven by socioeconomic factors such as poverty and gender inequality. Child marriage in South Sudan is associated with elevated maternal mortality and higher rates of school dropout. Economic and legal constraints under customary law make it difficult for women to get a divorce.

== Economy ==
South Sudan has the second highest proportion of women working in agriculture, forestry and fishing in the world.

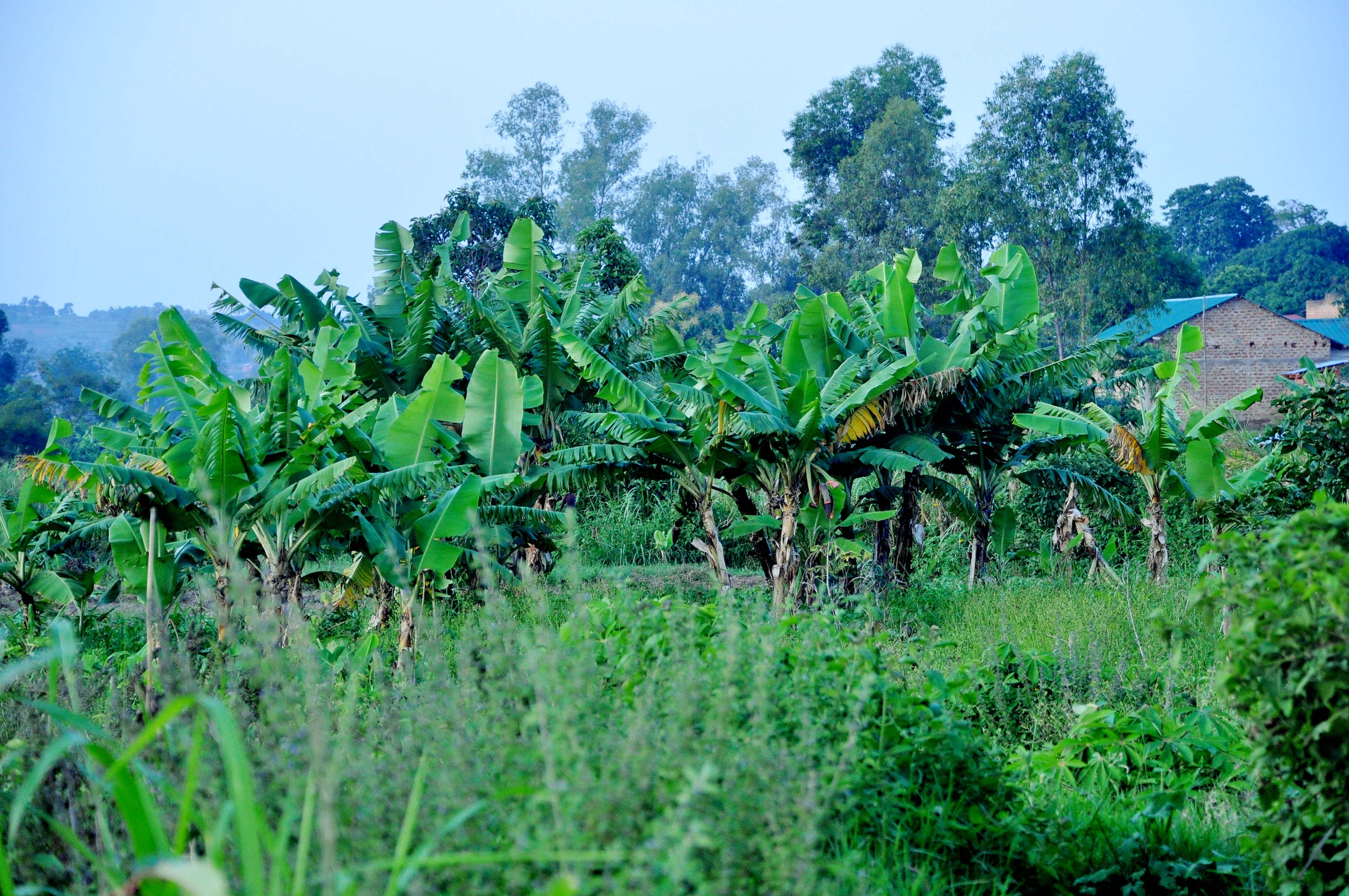
Banana plantation.

The economy of South Sudan is one of the world's most underdeveloped, with South Sudan having little existing infrastructure and the highest maternal mortality and female illiteracy rates in the world as of 2011. South Sudan exports timber to the international market. The region also contains many natural resources such as petroleum, iron ore, copper, chromium ore, zinc, tungsten, mica, silver, gold, diamonds, hardwoods, limestone and hydropower. The country's economy, as in many other developing countries, is heavily dependent on agriculture.

=== Oil ===
The oilfields in South Sudan have been significant to the economy since the latter part of the 20th century. In 2023, oil constitutes more than 90% of state revenues. The country has the third-largest oil reserves in Sub-Saharan Africa. However, after South Sudan became an independent nation in July 2011, southern and northern negotiators were not immediately able to reach an agreement on how to split the revenue from these southern oilfields.

Oil and gas concessions in Sudan – 2004

It is estimated that South Sudan has around 4 times the oil deposits of Sudan. The oil revenues, according to the Comprehensive Peace Agreement (CPA), were split equally for the duration of the agreement period. Since South Sudan relies on pipelines, refineries, and Port Sudan's facilities in Red Sea state in Sudan, the agreement stated that the government of Sudan in Khartoum would receive a 50% share of all oil revenues. This arrangement was maintained during the second period of autonomy from 2005 to 2011.

In the run up to independence, northern negotiators reportedly pressed for a deal maintaining the 50–50 split of oil revenues, while the South Sudanese were holding out for more favourable terms. Oil revenues constitute more than 98% of the government of South Sudan's budget according to the southern government's Ministry of Finance and Economic Planning and this has amounted to more than $8 billion in revenue since the signing of the peace agreement.

After independence, South Sudan objected to Sudan charging US$34 per barrel to transport oil through the pipeline to the oil terminal at Port Sudan. With production of around 30,000 barrels per day, this was costing over a million dollars per day. In January 2012, South Sudan suspended oil production, causing a dramatic reduction in revenue and food costs to rise by 120%. In 2017, Nile Drilling & Services became South Sudan's first locally owned and -run petroleum drilling company.

=== Debt ===
In terms of South Sudan's external debt, Sudan and South Sudan maintain a shared debt of approximately US$38 billion, all of which has accumulated throughout the past five decades. Though a small portion of this debt is owed to such international institutions as the World Bank and the International Monetary Fund (approximately US$5.3 billion according to a 2009 report provided by the Bank of Sudan), the bulk of its debt load is actually owed to numerous foreign actors that have provided the nation with financial loans, including the Paris Club (over US$11 billion) and also non-Paris Club bilateral creditors (over US$13 billion).

The Paris Club refers to an informal group of financial officials from 19 of the world's most influential economies, including such member nations as the United States, the United Kingdom, Germany, France and Canada, while non-Paris Club bilateral creditors refers to any entity that does not enjoy permanent/associated status as a Paris Club member. Private bilateral creditors (i.e. private commercial banks and private credit suppliers) account for the majority of the remainder (approximately US$6 billion of the total debt).

=== Inflation ===
Inflation, measured by consumer prices, rose to about 45% in 2011 and 2012, before falling to very low levels in 2013 and 2014. It increased sharply in 2015 and peaked at 380% in 2016, followed by a steady decline through 2019. Inflation remained low or negative between 2020 and 2022, before rising again in 2024 to around 90%. Inflation was driven by the monetisation of the fiscal deficit by the Bank of South Sudan, and fell after the pace of money printing slowed, falling to about 102% the following year. Inflation severely constrained household purchasing power, leaving many families in both urban and rural areas unable to afford even minimum food needs.

=== East African Community membership ===
The presidents of Kenya and Rwanda invited the Autonomous Government of Southern Sudan to apply for membership to the East African Community upon the independence of South Sudan in 2011, and South Sudan was reportedly an applicant country as of mid-July 2011. Analysts suggested that South Sudan's early efforts to integrate infrastructure, including rail links and oil pipelines, with systems in Kenya and Uganda indicated intention to pivot away from dependence on Sudan and toward the EAC.

On 17 September 2011, the Daily Nation quoted a South Sudanese MP as saying that while his government was eager to join the EAC, it would likely delay its membership over concerns that its economy was not sufficiently developed to compete with EAC member states and could become a "dumping ground" for Kenyan, Tanzanian, and Ugandan exports. This was contradicted by President Salva Kiir, who announced South Sudan had officially embarked on the application process one month later. The application was initially deferred by the EAC in December 2012, and incidents with Ugandan boda-boda operators in South Sudan created political tension.

In December 2012, Tanzania officially agreed to South Sudan's bid to join the EAC, clearing the way for the world's newest state to become the regional bloc's sixth member. In May 2013, the EAC set aside $82,000 for the admission process. Starting after the EAC Council of Ministers meeting in August 2013, was projected to take at least four years. At the 14th Ordinary Summit held in Nairobi in 2012, EAC heads of state approved the verification report that was presented by the Council of Ministers, then directed it to start the negotiation process with South Sudan.

A team was formed to assess South Sudan's bid; however, in April 2014, the nation requested a delay in the admissions process, presumably due to South Sudanese Civil War.

South Sudan's Minister of Foreign Affairs, Barnaba Marial Benjamin, claimed publicly in October 2015 that, following unpublished evaluations and meetings of a special technical committee in May, June, August, September and October, the committee has recommended that South Sudan be allowed to join the East African Community.

South Sudan was eventually approved for membership in East African Community in March 2016, and formally acceded with the signature of the treaty in April 2016.

=== South Sudan and the Commonwealth of Nations ===
South Sudan has applied to join the Commonwealth of Nations, considering that South Sudan was part of the Anglo-Egyptian Sudan, and has two republics in the Commonwealth of Nations, Kenya and Uganda, as neighbouring countries. There was an interest in joining almost immediately after South Sudan's independence.

=== Transport ===
Road transport is the most common and cheapest means of transport used in the country.

The Nile River provides the major water transport in South Sudan. The White Nile is a navigable waterway from the Lake Albert to Khartoum through Jebel Aulia Dam. Between Juba and Uganda, the river requires a channel to make it navigable. During part of the year the rivers are navigable up to Gambela, Ethiopia, and Wau, South Sudan.

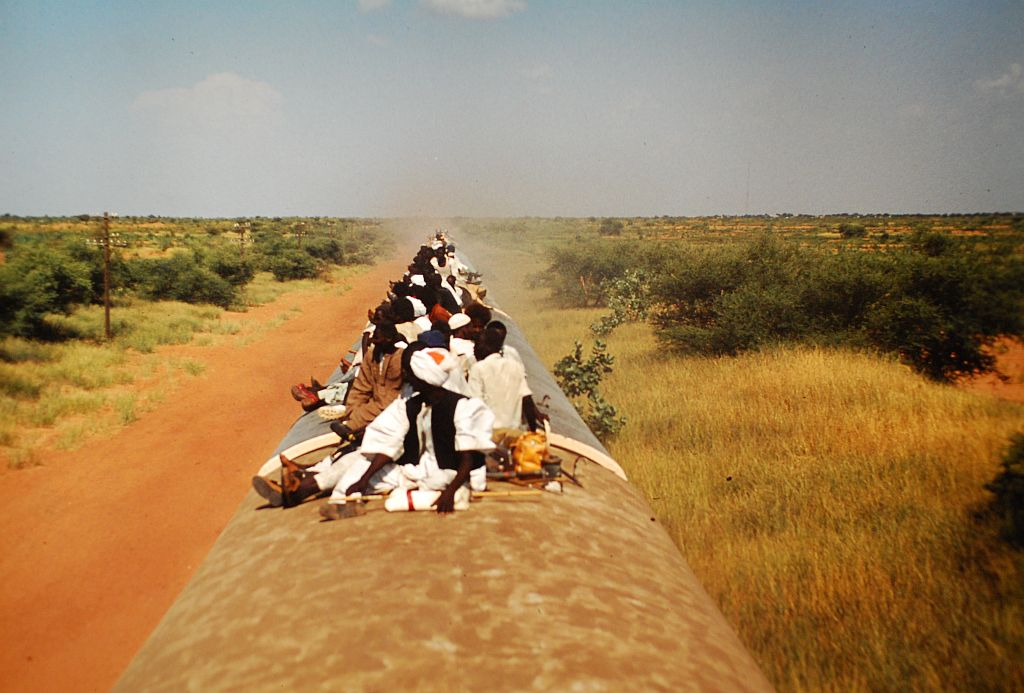
Passengers atop a train travelling towards Wau

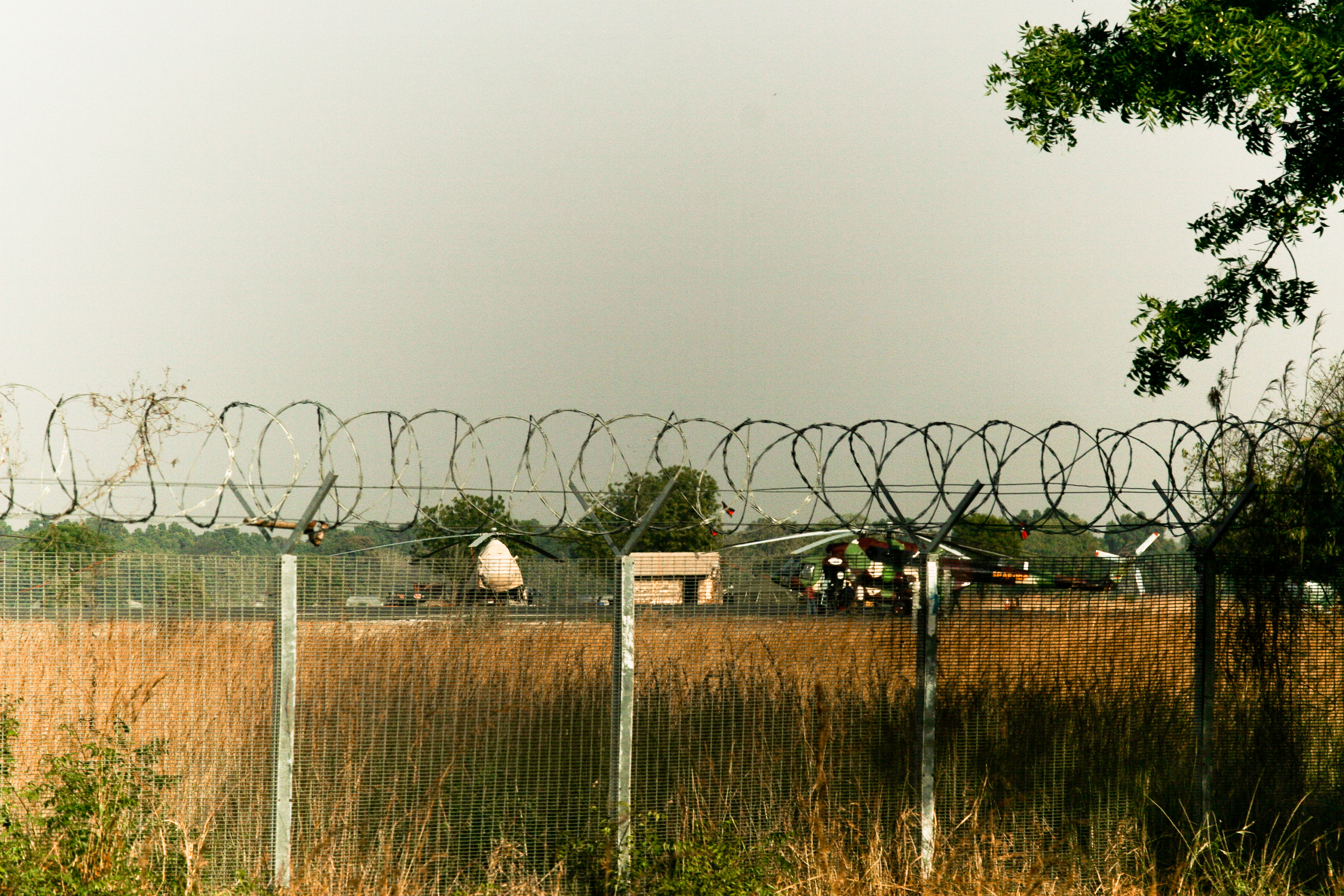
Two Mil Mi-17 helicopters at Juba Airport

==== Railway ====
South Sudan has 248 km (154 mi) of single-track 1,067 mm (3 ft 6 in) gauge railway line from the Sudanese border to Wau terminus. There are proposed extensions from Wau to Juba. There are also plans to link Juba with the Kenyan and Ugandan railway networks.

==== Air ====
The busiest and most developed airport in South Sudan is Juba Airport, which has regular international connections to Asmara, Entebbe, Nairobi, Cairo, Addis Ababa, and Khartoum. Juba Airport was also the home base of Feeder Airlines Company and Southern Star Airlines.

Other international airports include Malakal, with international flights to Addis Ababa and Khartoum; Wau, with weekly service to Khartoum; and Rumbek, also with weekly flights to Khartoum. Southern Sudan Airlines also serves Nimule and Akobo, which have unpaved runways. Several smaller airports exist throughout South Sudan, the majority consisting of little more than dirt runways.

On 4 April 2012, plans were unveiled to launch a South Sudanese national airline, primarily for domestic service at first but eventually expanding to international service.

=== Food insecurity and famine ===
Food insecurity has been a persistent and recurrent crisis in South Sudan since independence in 2011. Early conditions fluctuated between stressed and crisis levels, with localised emergencies along the Sudan border. Although good rainfall and harvests in 2012 brought temporary improvements, the civil war that began in December 2013 severely disrupted agriculture, displaced millions, and sharply worsened food security. By 2014 and 2015, about one third of the population faced crisis or emergency levels.

Conditions deteriorated further in 2016 amid conflict, economic collapse, high food prices, and restricted humanitarian access. In February 2017, famine was declared in parts of Unity and Northern Bahr el Ghazal States. Around 4.9 million people required urgent assistance, and more than one million children were acutely malnourished. Although expanded humanitarian operations helped contain the famine by mid 2017, severe food insecurity persisted.

From 2018 onward, between 5 million and 6 million people were regularly classified in crisis or emergency phases, driven by ongoing insecurity, displacement, economic decline, erratic rainfall, flooding, and pest outbreaks. After the civil war, food insecurity remained extremely high, affecting over half the population in some years. Despite periods of modest improvement, renewed conflict, climate shocks, economic deterioration, and the arrival of returnees and refugees from Sudan led to further deterioration in 2024 and 2025, with around 6 million people still facing acute food insecurity.

=== Water crisis ===
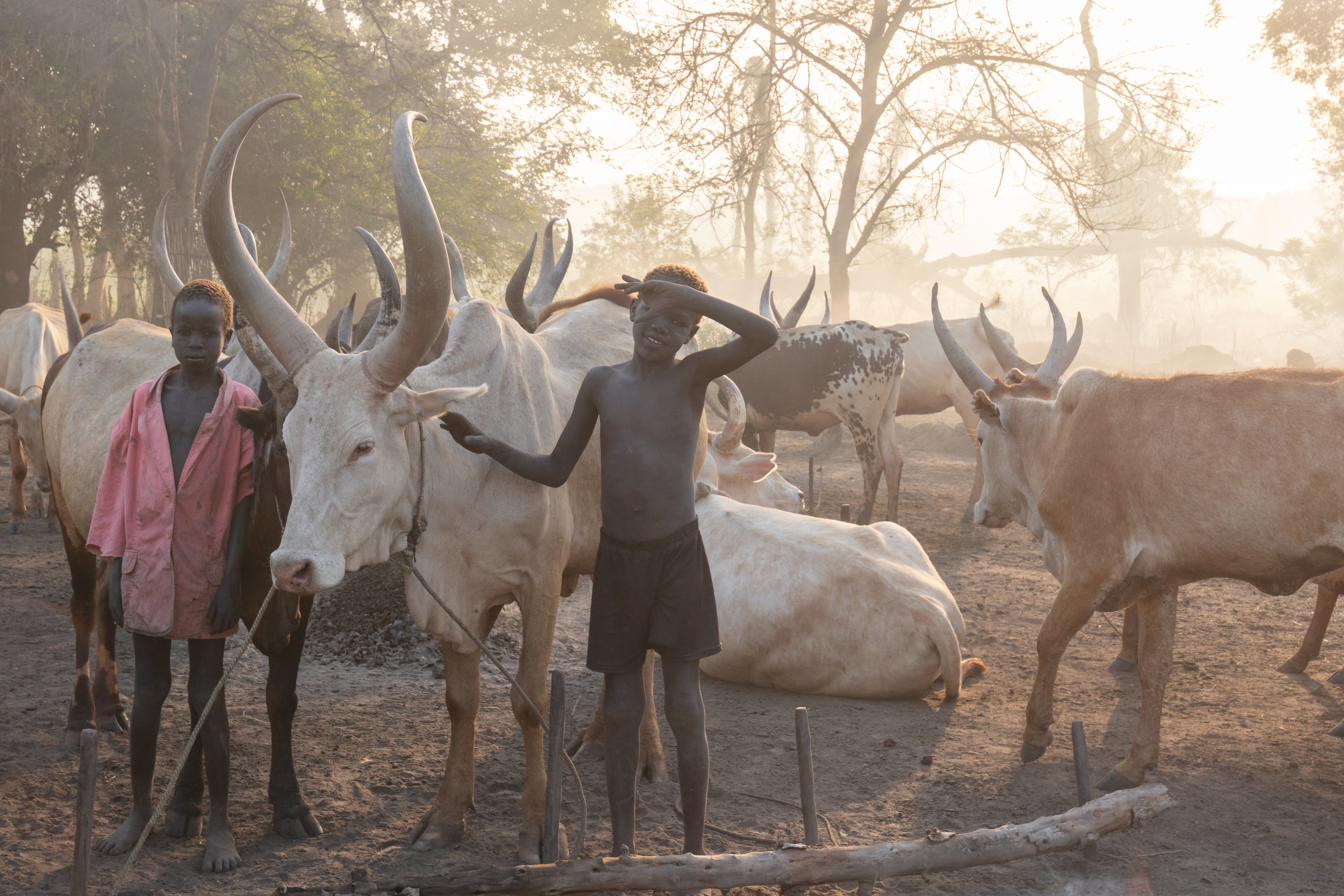
Cattle camp of the Mundari people in Central Equatoria

The water supply in South Sudan is faced with numerous challenges. Although the White Nile runs through the country, water is scarce during the dry season in areas that are not located on the river.

About half the population does not have access to an improved water source, defined as a protected well, standpipe or a handpump within one kilometre. The few existing piped water supply systems are often not well maintained and the water they provide is often not safe to drink. Displaced people returning home put a huge strain on infrastructure, and the government institutions in charge of the sector are weak. Substantial external funding from numerous government agencies and non-governmental organisations is available to improve water supply.

Numerous non-governmental organisations support water supply in Southern Sudan, such as Water is Basic, Water for South Sudan, the Obakki Foundation and Bridgton-Lake Region Rotary Club from North America.

== Demographics ==
South Sudan has a population of approximately 11 million and a predominantly rural, subsistence economy. This region has been negatively affected by war for all but 10 of the years since 1956, resulting in serious neglect, lack of infrastructure development, and major destruction and displacement. More than 2 million people have died, and more than 4 million are internally displaced persons or became refugees as a result of the civil war and its impact.

=== Largest cities ===
Largest cities or towns in South Sudan According to the 2008 Census
Rank	Name	State	Pop.	Juba Wau
1	Juba	Central Equatoria	230,195	Juba Wau
2	Wau	Western Bahr el Ghazal	118,331	Juba Wau
3	Malakal	Upper Nile	114,528	Juba Wau
4	Yambio	Western Equatoria	105,881	Juba Wau
5	Yei	Central Equatoria	69,720	Juba Wau
6	Renk	Upper Nile	69,079	Juba Wau
7	Aweil	Northern Bahr el Ghazal	59,217	Juba Wau
8	Maridi	Western Equatoria	55,602	Juba Wau
9	Bentiu	Unity	41,328	Juba Wau
10	Bor	Jonglei	25,188	Juba Wau

=== Population ===
==== 2008 census ====
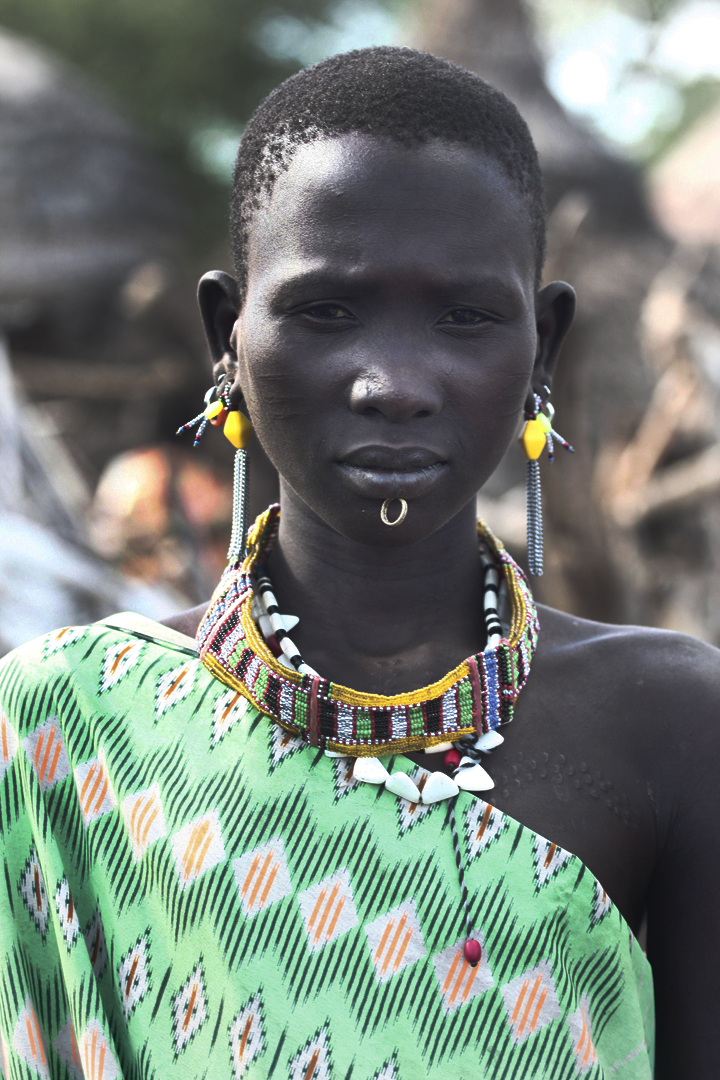
Woman in South Sudan

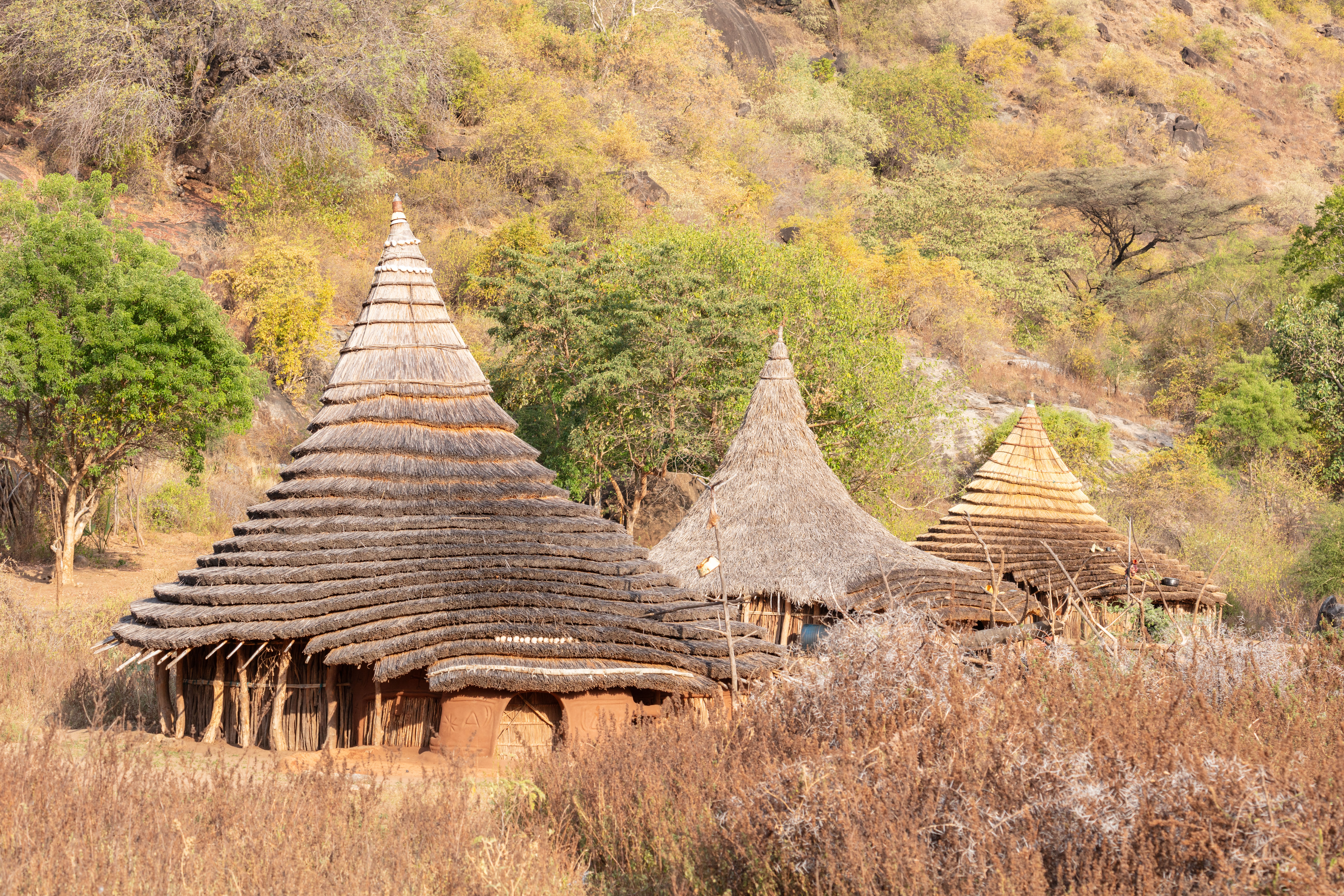
A village in Kimotong, South Sudan

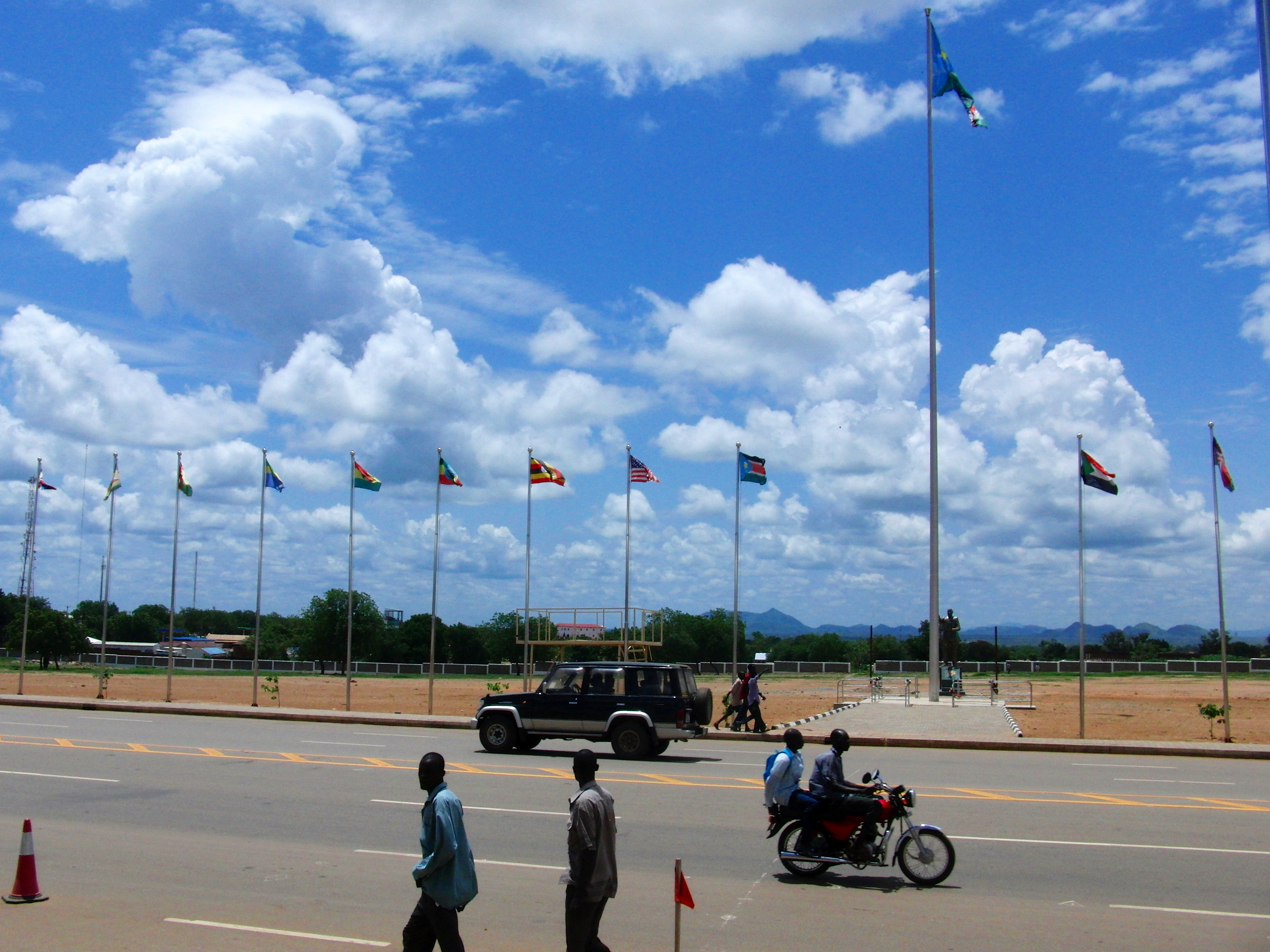
John Garang Square in Juba

The "Fifth Population and Housing Census of Sudan", for Sudan as a whole, was conducted in April 2008. The census counted the Southern Sudan population at 8.26 million; however, Southern Sudanese officials rejected the census results of Southern Sudan because "the central bureau of statistics in Khartoum refused to share the national Sudan raw census data with the southern Sudan centre for census, statistics and evaluation".

In addition, President Kiir "suspected figures were being deflated in some regions and inflated in others, and that made the final tally 'unacceptable'." He claimed that the Southern Sudanese population actually constituted one-third of that of Sudan, though the census showed it to be only 22%.

Many southern Sudanese were also said to have been uncounted "due to bad weather, poor communication and transport networks, and some areas were unreachable, while many southern Sudanese remained in exile in neighbouring countries, leading to 'unacceptable results', according [to] southern Sudanese authorities." The chief American technical adviser for the census in the south said that the census-takers probably reached only 89% of the population.

==== 2009 census ====
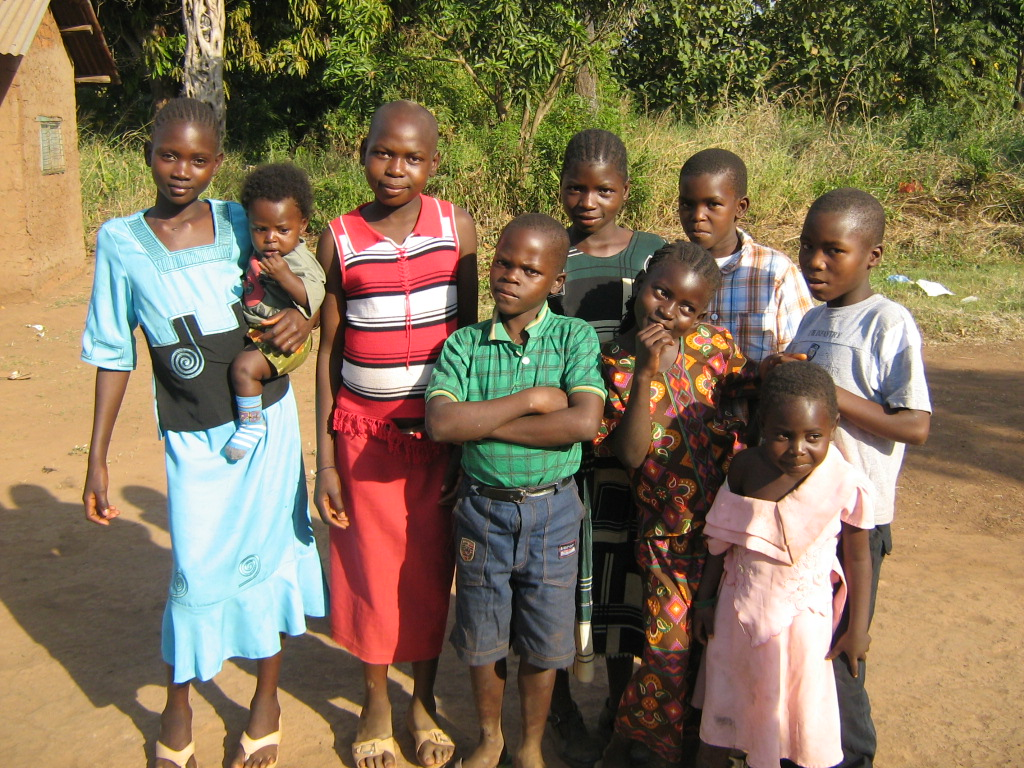
Children in Yambio, Western Equatoria, South Sudan

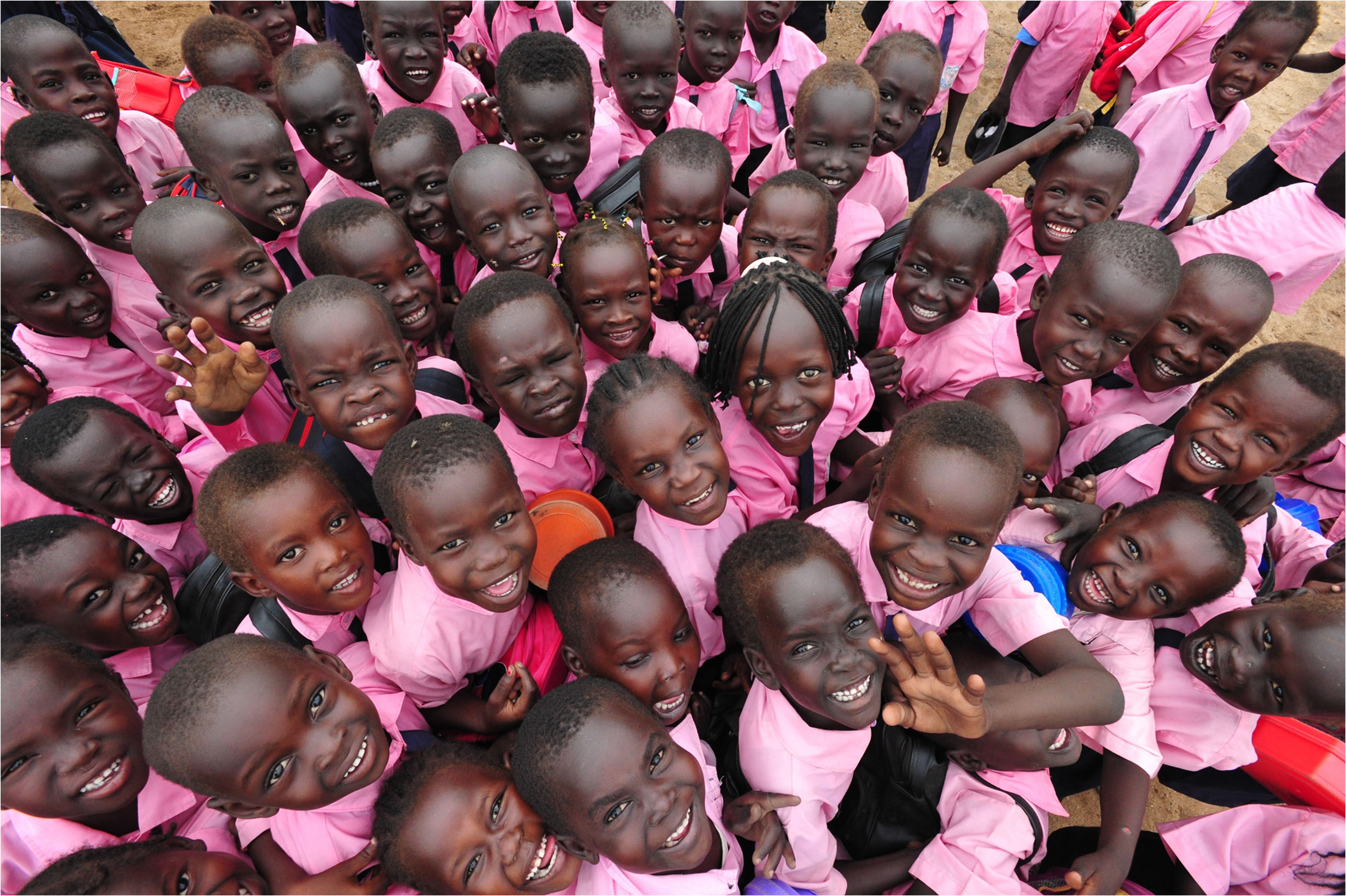
Rural school children participating in the USAID-funded Southern Sudan Interactive Radio Instruction project, July 2010

In 2009, Sudan initiated a Southern Sudanese census ahead of the 2011 independence referendum, which would also include the South Sudanese diaspora; however, this initiative was criticised for leaving out countries with a high share of the South Sudanese diaspora, rather counting countries where the diaspora share was low.

=== Ethnic groups ===
Map of the ethnic groups of South Sudan

The major ethnic groups present in South Sudan are the Dinka at approximately 40 per cent of the population, the Nuer at approximately 20 per cent, and the Azande at approximately 10 per cent, as well as the Shilluk and Bari. Currently, around 800,000 expatriates from the Horn of Africa are living in South Sudan.

=== Diaspora ===
The South Sudanese diaspora consists of citizens of South Sudan residing abroad. The number of South Sudanese outside South Sudan has sharply increased since the beginning of the struggle for independence from Sudan. Almost one and a half million South Sudanese have left the country as refugees, either permanently or as temporary workforce, leading to the establishment of the South Sudanese diaspora population.

The largest communities of the South Sudanese diaspora are located in North America, Western Europe and Oceania. They can be found in the United States, Canada, United Kingdom and Australia. Small communities exist in France, Italy, Germany, Sweden, and New Zealand.

=== Languages ===
Seventy languages are spoken in South Sudan, of which 60 are indigenous and granted constitutional status as "national languages" that "shall be respected, developed and promoted". English is the sole official language, being constitutionally enshrined as the "official working language" of government and the "language of instruction at all levels of education". English had been the principal language of what is now South Sudan since 1972, serving as the common medium for administrative purposes. However, few South Sudanese speak it as a first language.

The majority of languages spoken in South Sudan are classified within the Nilo-Saharan Language family, specifically the subbranches of Nile Sudanic and Central Sudanic; most of the remainder are part of the Adamawa-Ubangi branch of the Niger-Congo family. The most common languages are Dinka (1.35 million), Nuer (740,000), Bari (595,000), and Zande (420,000), which are collectively spoken by approximately 60% of the population; other major indigenous languages include Murle, Luo, Ma'di, and Otuho. Six indigenous languages are threatened with extinction, with another 11 declining.

Arabic, a Semitic language of the Afroasiatic family, is the most widely spoken language. The most common variety is Juba Arabic, also known as South Sudanese Arabic, a creole language that serves as the lingua franca for local governments, national commerce, and in urban areas. It is spoken by approximately 1.45 million people, of whom only 250,000 speak it natively. Sudanese Arabic, the prevailing dialect in Sudan, has approximately 460,000 speakers, primarily in the northern regions of South Sudan; it has been described as the de facto language of national identity. Arabic had been recognised as South Sudan's second official language, alongside English, in its 2005 interim constitution, but has no legal status in the current transitional constitution adopted in 2011.

Swahili, a Bantu language spoken primarily in East Africa, has been proposed as a second official language. In 2011, South Sudan's ambassador to Kenya stated that Swahili would be introduced in South Sudan with the goal of supplanting Arabic as a lingua franca, in keeping with the country's orientation toward the East African Community rather than Sudan and the Arab League. Following the South Sudan's ascension to the East African Community in 2019, the government has moved to adopt Swahili into the official curricula at primary school. Nevertheless, South Sudan submitted an application to join the Arab League as a member state on 25 March 2014, which is still pending. In an interview with the newspaper Asharq Al-Awsat, the Foreign Minister of South Sudan Deng Alor Kuol said: South Sudan is the closest African country to the Arab world, and we speak a special kind of Arabic known as Juba Arabic. Sudan supports South Sudan's request to join the Arab League. Juba Arabic is a lingua franca in South Sudan.

=== Religion ===
Religion in South Sudan (ARDA 2020 est.)
1. Christianity (60.3%)
2. Ethnic Religion (33.0%)
3. Islam (6.26%)
4. Baháʼí (0.01%)
5. None (0.44%)

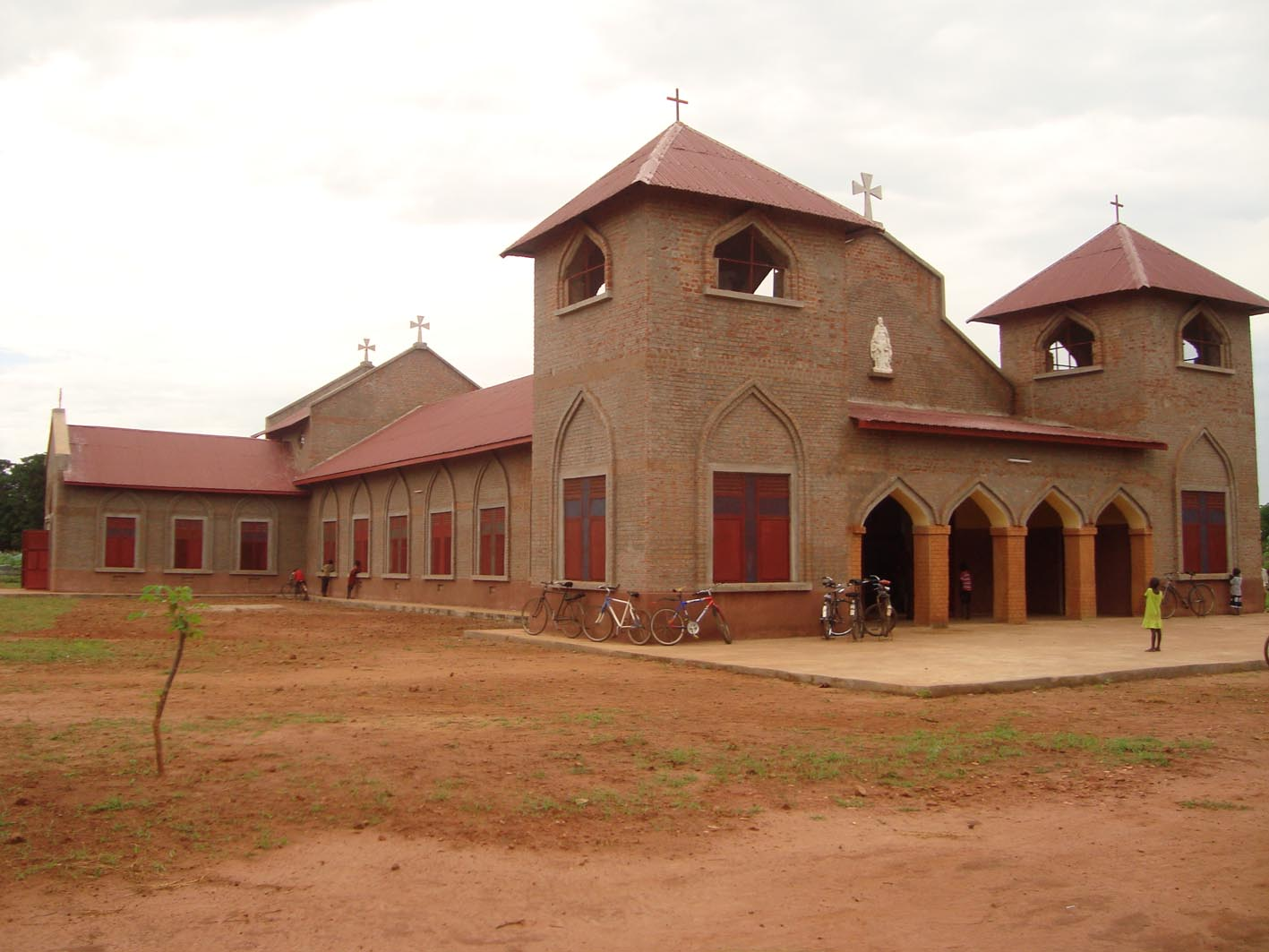
Holy Cross Cathedral in Lakes State

South Sudan is predominantly Christian. Other religions include various traditional indigenous belief systems, and Islam. Exact figures are lacking due to internal displacement from ongoing conflict, large numbers of frequently-migrating pastoralists, and insufficient government resources. The last official census to take into account religion was in 1956, where a majority of people were classified as adherents of traditional beliefs or Christianity, while 18% were Muslim. In 2012, the Pew Research Center estimated its population to be 60.5% Christian, 32.9% following folk religions, and 6.2% Muslim. It maintained the same estimate in 2020.

The US State Department reported in 2023 that the South Sudan Council of Churches and the government Bureau of Religious Affairs give the principal Christian denominations as Roman Catholic, Episcopal, Presbyterian, Pentecostal, Sudan Interior, Presbyterian Evangelical, and African Inland Churches. Smaller congregations of Eritrean Orthodox, Ethiopian Orthodox, Coptic Orthodox, Greek Orthodox, The Church of Jesus Christ of Latter-day Saints, Seventh-day Adventists, and Jehovah's Witnesses are also present.

In 2001, the World Christian Encyclopedia said that the Catholic Church was the largest single Christian body in Sudan since 1995, with the country's 2.7 million Catholics being concentrated in what is today South Sudan. Catholic sources say the denomination made up 52% of the population of Christians in 2020. The other major denominations are Episcopal Church (3.5 million members) and the Presbyterian Church (one million members in 2012).

Christianity has grown rapidly in the country over the last two decades. Despite European missionary activity beginning as early as the mid-19th century, the US Library of Congress states that "in the early 1990s possibly no more than 10% of southern Sudan's population was Christian". During this same period, official records of Sudan claimed that one-quarter of the population of present-day South Sudan practised various traditional religions while only 5% were Christians. Various scholarly sources, as well as the US Department of State, stated that a majority of southern Sudanese maintained traditional animist indigenous beliefs at the start of the 21st century, with Christians remaining a small minority.

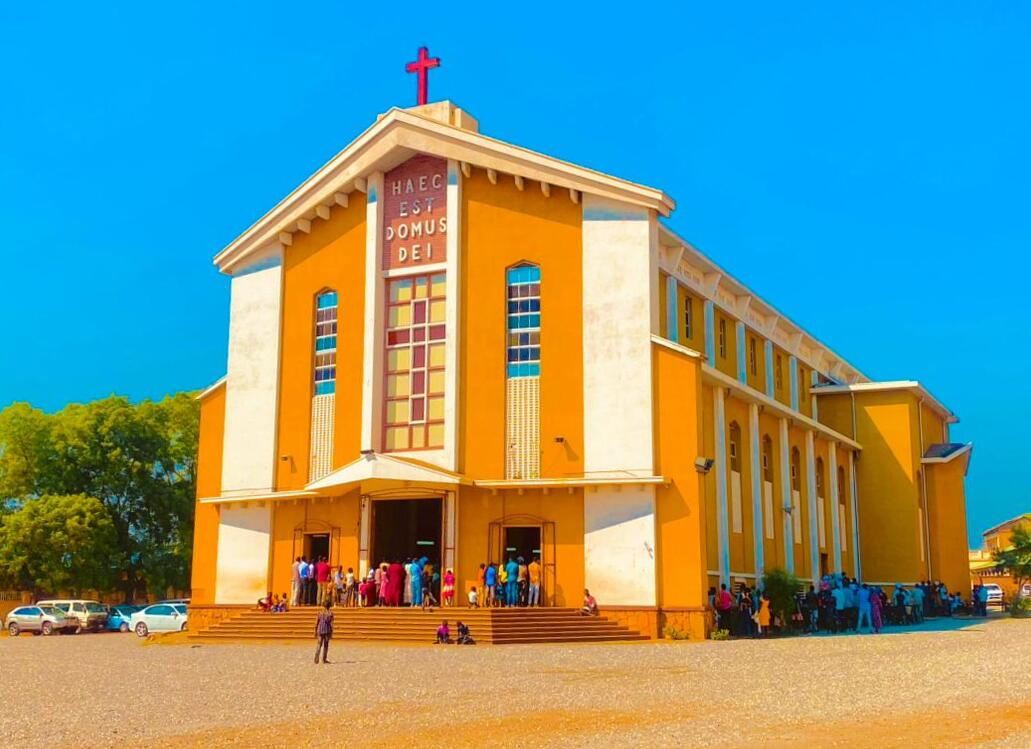
St. Theresa Cathedral in Juba

As in other countries in sub-Saharan Africa, Christianity is often blended with traditional beliefs. In 2022, the new Catholic bishop of Rumbek, Christian Carlassare, observed that while more than half the population of South Sudan is Christian, "Christianity is often no more than skin deep" and "hasn't grown roots in the life of the population". Many religious organisations function as a source of stability, community, humanitarian aid, and refuge in the absence of government institutions, with Christian and Muslim religious leaders actively involved in peacebuilding and socioeconomic development.

Indigenous animist beliefs remain widespread among the population regardless of religious affiliation. Additionally, each ethnic group has its own traditional belief system, all of which share a concept of a higher spirit or divinity, generally a creator god. Traditional African cosmology divides the universe between a visible material realm and an invisible heavenly realm, which is populated by spiritual beings that serve as intermediaries or messengers of a higher power; in the case of the Nilotic peoples, these spirits are identified with ancestors. The supreme deity is worshipped through rituals that use music and dance.

Although the internal conflicts that precipitated Sudan's partition have been characterised as between Muslims and Christians, some scholars reject this notion, claiming Muslim and Christian sides sometimes overlapped. Muslims are relatively well integrated into South Sudanese society and represented in government; Muslim religious leaders are present in all major political ceremonies as well as peace negotiations. Islamic private schools are maintained with little government involvement, while many secondary institutions include Islamic theology in their curricula.

In 2011, inaugural South Sudanese president Salva Kiir, a Roman Catholic, said that South Sudan would be a nation that respects freedom of religion. The country's transitional constitution provides for separation of religion and state, prohibits religious discrimination, and provides religious groups freedom to worship, assemble, proselytise, own property, receive financial contributions, communicate and publish materials on religious matters, and establish charitable institutions. Interreligious conflict occurs largely in the context of ethnic and communal conflict; for example, in February 2022, clashes between Dinka clans resulted in the targeting of associated religious buildings and leaders.

=== Education ===
Unlike the previous educational system of the regional Southern Sudan—which was modelled after the system used in the Republic of Sudan since 1990—the current educational system of the Republic of South Sudan follows the 8 + 4 + 4 system (similar to Kenya). Primary education consists of eight years, followed by four years of secondary education, and then four years of university instruction.

The primary language at all levels is English, as compared to the Republic of Sudan, where the language of instruction is Arabic. In 2007, South Sudan adopted English as the official language of communication. There is a severe shortage of English teachers and English-speaking teachers in the scientific and technical fields.

On 1 October 2019, the South Sudan Library Foundation opened South Sudan's first public library, the Juba Public Peace Library in Gudele 2. The library currently employs a staff of over 40 volunteers and maintains a collection of over 13,000 books. The South Sudan Library Foundation was co-founded by Yawusa Kintha and Kevin Lenahan.

In 2025, UNICEF reported that around 3 million children were out of school, limiting their access to education and future opportunities.

=== Health ===
South Sudan has one of the weakest health systems in the world, marked by a severely weakened public health system, shortages of qualified health workers, and restricted access to care. These problems have been shaped by decades of conflict, poverty, low literacy, and the country's largely rural economy, in which much of the population depends on subsistence farming or animal husbandry.

Even before independence, South Sudan had among the worst health indicators in the world, a situation that has persisted since then. Neonatal and maternal mortality rates remain among the highest globally, life expectancy is low, and in 2016, the country had the second-lowest expected human capital among 195 countries.

The country's health burden includes widespread malaria, recurrent cholera outbreaks, food insecurity, and undernutrition. Conflict and insecurity have further weakened the health system by damaging facilities, reducing access to basic services, and restricting humanitarian access.

=== Humanitarian situation ===
The continued fighting has caused severe humanitarian harm. Civilians have been killed, homes and vital infrastructure have been damaged, destroyed or looted, and hundreds of thousands of people have been displaced. Insecurity has also limited humanitarian access, leaving many communities without essential assistance.

As of December 2017, an estimated 42% of the South Sudanese population was facing severe security conditions, with most of the affected being young people and children. According to the United Nations, 8.3 million people were in need of humanitarian aid in South Sudan as of January 2021.

In 2025, 7.7 million people, or 57% of the population, faced acute food insecurity, with conflict as the main driver, next to escalating insecurity that displaced large numbers of people, together with recurrent flooding that continued to undermine livelihoods and agricultural production. Malnutrition also worsened, with 2.3 million children at risk of acute malnutrition, amid access constraints, health service disruptions, and a cholera outbreak affecting Upper Nile and Unity states.

In 2026, South Sudan remained in a severe humanitarian crisis, with around 10 million people, about two-thirds of the population, estimated to need humanitarian assistance. More than 2.3 million South Sudanese were refugees or asylum-seekers abroad, while 2.5 million people were internally displaced. Food insecurity was acute: the IPC projected that over 7.5 million people would face high levels of acute food insecurity during the 2026 lean season, with several areas at risk of famine. The crisis in South Sudan has been worsened by the war in neighbouring Sudan. By April 2026, more than 1.3 million people had entered South Sudan, including 900,000 South Sudanese returnees.

=== Refugees ===
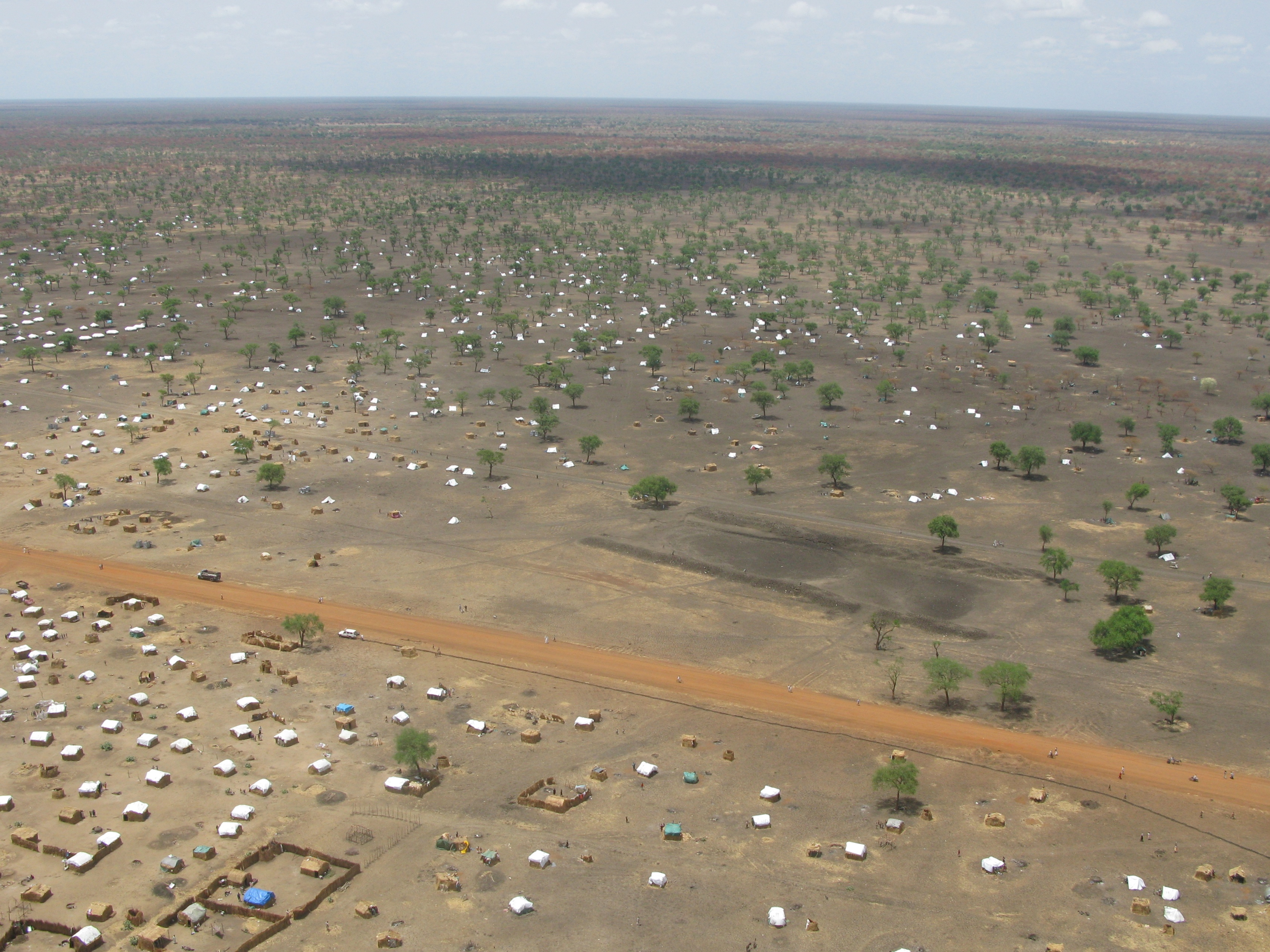
Jamam refugee camp

As a result of the war that erupted in December 2013, more than 2.3 million people, one in every five people in South Sudan, were forced to flee their homes. This included about 1.66 million internally displaced people (IDPs), an estimated 53.4% of whom were children, and nearly 644,900 refugees in neighbouring countries. Some 185,000 IDPs sought refuge in UN Protection of Civilians sites, while around 90% remained outside these locations, either on the move or sheltering elsewhere. In response, UNHCR stepped up its engagement through an inter-agency collaborative approach under the leadership of the Humanitarian Coordinator, and working with the International Organization for Migration. In early February 2013, UNHCR started distributing relief items outside the UN base in Malakal, South Sudan, which was expected to reach 10,000 people.

As of February 2014, South Sudan was host to over 230,000 refugees, with the vast majority, over 209,000, having arrived recently from Sudan, because of the War in Darfur. Other African countries that contribute the most refugees to South Sudan are the Central African Republic, Ethiopia, and the Democratic Republic of the Congo.

By January 2025, more than one million people had fled the 2023 war in Sudan for South Sudan. By November 2025, the continued arrivals, alongside returning South Sudanese nationals, placed additional pressure on already strained markets, services, and natural resources, while a prolonged economic crisis sharply reduced household purchasing power. These conditions were further aggravated by disease outbreaks, limited access to health care, and inadequate water, sanitation, and hygiene services.

== Culture ==
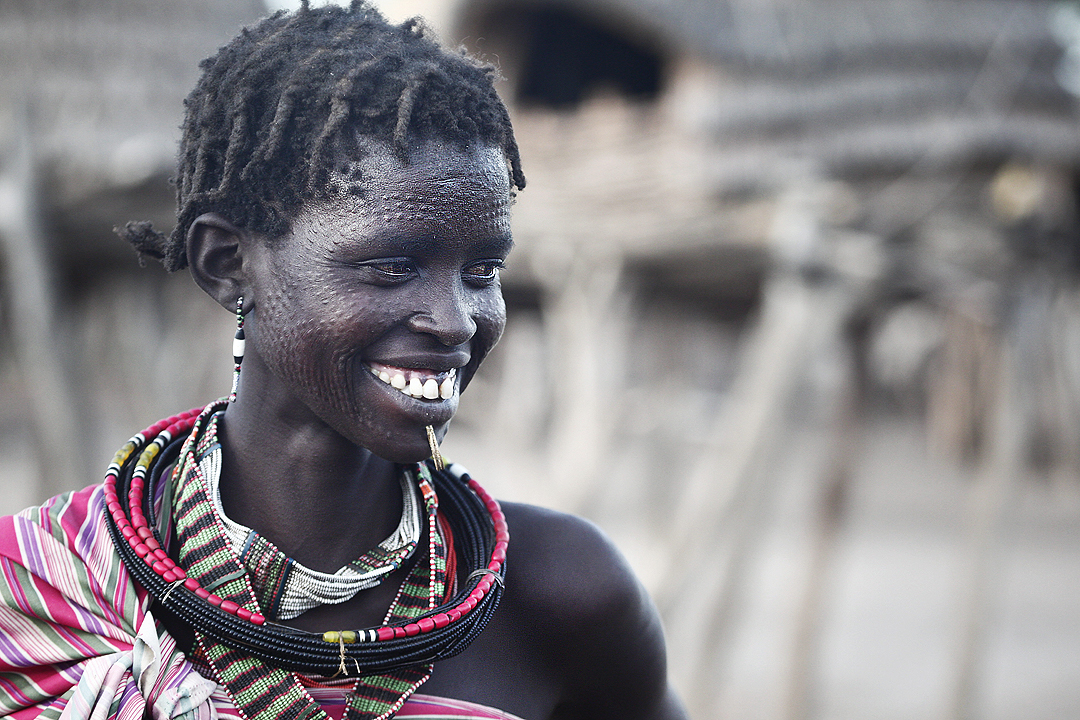
Scarified woman, South Sudan, 2011

Due to the many years of civil war, South Sudan's culture is heavily influenced by its neighbours. Many South Sudanese fled to Ethiopia, Kenya and Uganda where they interacted with the nationals and learned their languages and culture. Most of those who remained in Sudan until or after independence partially assimilated to Sudanese culture and speak Juba Arabic or Sudanese Arabic.

Most South Sudanese value knowing one's tribal origin, its traditional culture and dialect even while in exile and diaspora. Although the common languages spoken are Juba Arabic and English, Swahili might be introduced to the population to improve the country's relations with its East African neighbours.

=== Music ===
Many music artists from South Sudan use English, Swahili, Juba Arabic, their native African language or a mix of all. Popular artists like Barbz, Yaba Angelosi, De Peace Child sing Afro-beat, R&B, and Zouk; Dynamq is popular for his reggae releases; and Emmanuel Kembe who sings folk, reggae and Afro-beat. Also hip hop artists like Emmanuel Jal, FTG Metro, Flizzame and Dugga Mulla (of FMG). Emmanuel being one of the South Sudaneses music artists who have broken through on an international level with his unique form of hip hop and a positive message in his lyrics. Jal, a former child soldier turned musician, received good airplay and album reviews in the UK and has also been sought out for the lecture circuit with major talks at popular talkfests like TED.

=== Media ===
While former Information Minister Barnaba Marial Benjamin vowed that South Sudan will respect freedom of the press and allow journalists unrestricted access in the country, the chief editor of Juba newspaper The Citizen claimed that in the absence of a formal freedom of the press law, he and his staff have faced abuse at the hands of security forces. This alleged fettering of media freedom was attributed in an Al Jazeera report to the difficulty SPLM has faced in reforming itself as a legitimate government after years of leading a rebellion against the Sudanese government. The Citizen is South Sudan's largest newspaper, but poor infrastructure and poverty have kept its staff relatively small and limited the efficiency of both its reporting and its circulation outside of Juba, with no dedicated news bureaus in outlying states and newspapers often taking several days to reach states like Northern Bahr el Ghazal. In May 2020, South Sudan Friendship Press was established as the country's first dedicated online news website. Nile citizens is laid out as the nation's committed web-based news site.

==== Censorship ====
On 1 November 2011, South Sudan's National Security Services (NSS) arrested the editor of a private Juba-based daily, Destiny, and suspended its activities indefinitely. This was in response to an opinion article by columnist Dengdit Ayok, entitled "Let Me Say So", which criticised the president for allowing his daughter to marry an Ethiopian national, and accused him of "staining his patriotism". An official letter accused the newspaper of breaking "the media code of conduct and professional ethics", and of publishing "illicit news" that was defamatory, inciting, and invading the privacy of personalities. The Committee to Protect Journalists had voiced concerns over media freedoms in South Sudan in September. The NSS released the journalists without charge after having held them for 18 days.

In 2015, Salva Kiir threatened to kill journalists who reported "against the country". Work conditions have become terrible for journalists, and many have left the country, such as documentarian Ochan Hannington. In August 2015, after journalist Peter Moi was killed in a targeted attack, being the seventh journalist killed during the year, South Sudanese journalists held a 24-hour news blackout.

In August 2017, a 26-year-old American journalist, Christopher Allen, was killed in Kaya, Yei River State, during fighting between government and opposition forces. Christopher Allen was a freelance journalist who had worked for several US news outlets. He had been reportedly embedded with the opposition forces in South Sudan for a week before he was killed. The same month, President Salva Kiir said the millions of civilians fleeing South Sudan were being driven by the propaganda from social media users conspiring against his government. Just a month prior in July 2017, access to major news websites and popular blogs including Sudan Tribune and Radio Tamazuj had been blocked by the government without formal notice. In June 2020, access to Sudans Post, a local news website, was blocked by the government following the publication of an article deemed defamatory by the NSS. Two months later, Qurium Media Foundation, a Swedish non-profit organisation, announced that it has deployed a mirror for the website to circumvent the government blocking.

=== Sports ===
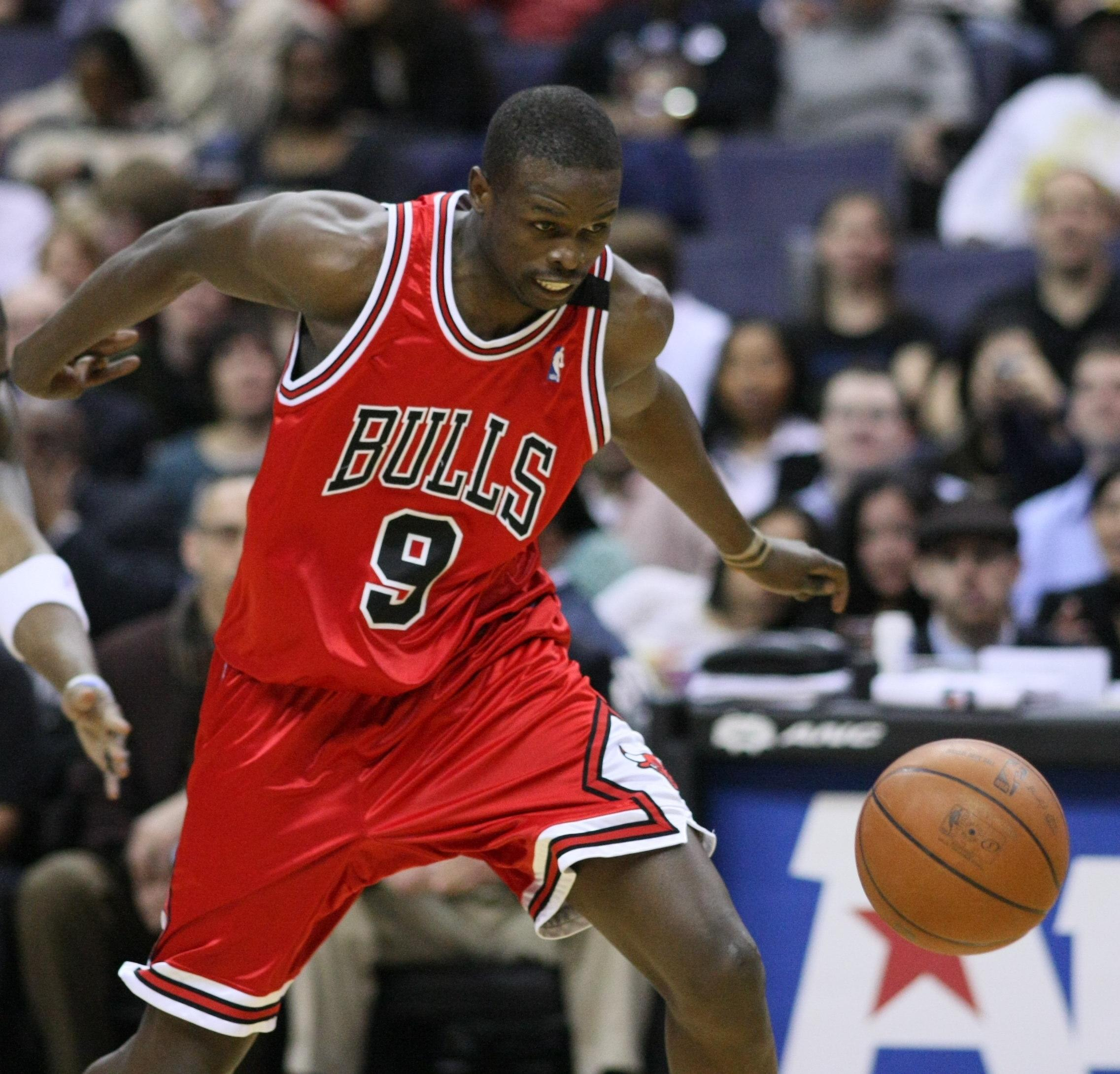
South Sudanese-born basketball player Luol Deng

Many traditional and modern games and sports are popular in South Sudan, particularly wrestling and mock battles. The traditional sports were mainly played after the harvest seasons to celebrate the harvests and finish the farming seasons. During the matches, they smeared themselves with ochre – perhaps to enhance the grip or heighten their perception. The matches attracted large numbers of spectators who sang, played drums and danced in support of their favourite wrestlers. Though these were perceived as competition, they were primarily for entertainment. Association football is also becoming popular in South Sudan, and there are many initiatives by the Government of South Sudan and other partners to promote the sport and improve the level of play. One of these initiatives is South Sudan Youth Sports Association (SSYSA). SSYSA is already holding football clinics in Konyokonyo and Muniki areas of Juba in which young boys are coached. In recognition of these efforts with youth football, the country recently hosted the CECAFA youth football competitions. Barely a month earlier, it had also hosted the larger East African Schools Sports tournaments.

The South Sudan national football team joined the Confederation of African Football in February 2012 and became a full FIFA member in May 2012. The team played its first match against Tusker FC of the Kenyan Premier League on 10 July 2011 in Juba as part of independence celebrations, scoring early but losing 1–3 to the more experienced team. Famous South Sudanese footballers are Machop Chol, James Moga, Richard Justin, Athir Thomas, Goma Genaro Awad, Khamis Leyano, Khamis Martin, William Afani Clicks and Roy Gulwak.

Luol Deng was a National Basketball Association star in the United States; at the international level, he represented Great Britain. Other leading international basketball players from South Sudan include Manute Bol, Nuni Omot, Kueth Duany, Deng Gai, Ater Majok, Wenyen Gabriel, and Thon Maker. The South Sudan national basketball team played its first match against the Uganda national basketball team on 10 July 2011 in Juba. The nation made their debut at the FIBA Basketball World Cup in 2023. They also made their AfroBasket debut in 2021 finishing 7th.

One athlete from South Sudan, Guor Marial, competed in the 2012 Summer Olympics. Due to South Sudan not yet having an official Olympics organisation, and Marial not yet possessing American citizenship, he, along with three athletes from the former Netherlands Antilles, competed under the banner of Independent Olympic Athletes.

On 2 August at the 128th IOC Session, South Sudan was granted full recognition of its National Olympic Committee. South Sudan competed at the 2016 Summer Olympics with three athletes in track and field. No medals were won during this Olympics.

== See also ==
- Outline of South Sudan
