= Dynamq =

South Sudanese Reggae-dancehall artist

- Also known as: The Sudanese Son; DJ Dynamq
- Born: Kennedy Ongele Lorya
- Origin: South Sudan
- Genres: Dancehall Afro Beat Ruka
- Occupations: Singer; DJ; Producer; Humanitarian
- Years active: 2004–present
- Label: Akuen
- Website: www.dynamq.com

Kennedy Ongele Lorya, professionally known as Dynamq, is a South Sudanese Reggae-dancehall artist, DJ, music producer, the founder of Dynamq Sounds International and the Non-governmental organization Dynamq Foundation in Juba south Sudan.

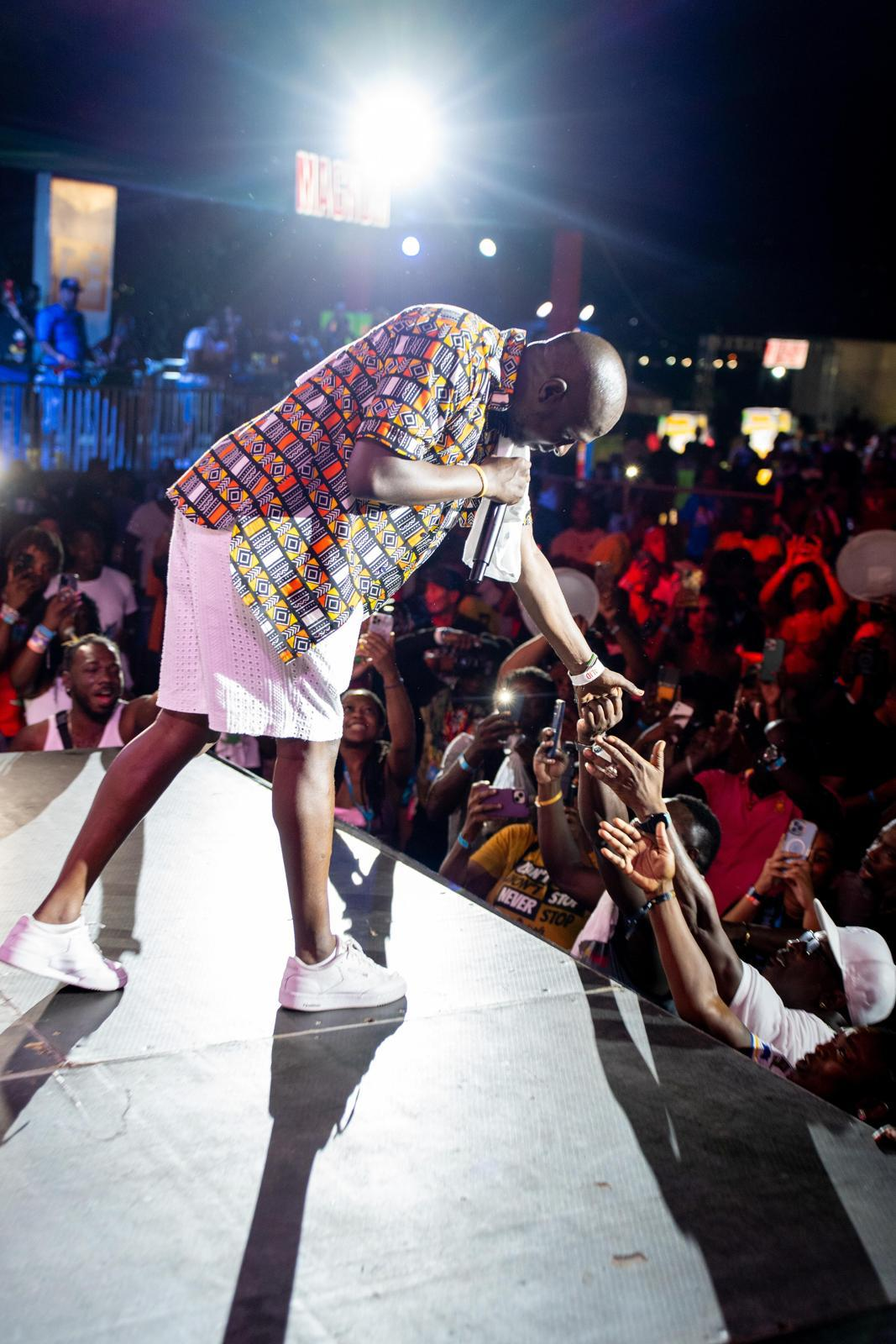
Dynamq

== Early life ==
Dynamq was born in a family of seven children. He grew up in a refugee camp in Kenya known as Kakuma, having had to flee the civil war in his native Sudan. His love for music came from attending Sunday school, and he got involved with Jamaican music while at the camp.

He joined the world music collective One World Tribe at 18, where he developed his stage presence. His affiliation with sound systems began with the Shashamane set.

After relocating to Kansas City, Missouri, he formed Dynamq in 2015 and has competed in several sound clashes.

== Career ==
=== Sound System | Sound Clashes ===
His first big stage show was at the 1996 King Lions Sounds 'Rasta Festival', held at the City Hall in Nairobi. He is the reigning Rumble champion and holds the Bermuda Triangle champion title. He has made it to the semi-finals in the popular Boom Clash in Jamaica and the River Nile Crocodile and Jamie Hype from Young Hawk sound, formed Team USA to compete in, and win, the famous War Ina East championship.

He has shared the stage with various artists such as Damian Marley, Benjy Myaz, Lady G, Richie Spice, Luie Culture, George Nooks, Jesse Royal, Queen Ifrica, Mikey Spice, I Wayne, I-Octane and Beenie Man.

== Awards and nominations ==
Year	Award ceremony	Prize	Result
2012	Afro Entertainment Awards	Best Songwriter	Nominated
2012	Afro Entertainment Awards	Best Music Video	Nominated
2012	Afro Entertainment Awards	Best Male artist	Nominated
2012	Afro Entertainment Awards	Best Talented Artist	Nominated
2012	Afro Entertainment Awards	Best International Artist	Nominated
2012	Afro Entertainment Awards	Best Music Album	Nominated
2015	All Africa Music Awards	Best Male East Africa	Nominated
2016	MTN/Eye Radio Music Awards	Best Reggae Artist	Won
2017	All Africa Music Awards	Best Male East Africa	Nominated
2019	South Sudan Music Awards	Best International Act	Nominated
