= Protestantism in Sudan =

Protestants are about 2,009,374 in Sudan (5% of the population). They are forbidden to proselytize. The law makes apostasy (which includes conversion from Islam to another religion) punishable by death. The southern ethnic groups fighting the civil war largely are followers of traditional indigenous religions or Christians.

Protestantism first arrived in Sudan in 1889 when the Church Mission Society in England started a Gordon Memorial Mission and Llewellyn Henry Gwynne was sent to Khartoum for the first time. He was joined a year later by Rev J Kelly Giffin, a Presbyterian missionary from the US. Other missionaries based in Egypt travelled to Khartoum over the next decade and several schools and a hospital were opened. The British government gave permission for their work provided they did not proselytize local Muslims.

In 2021, Christians made up 5.4% of the population of Sudan. The largest groups were Coptic Orthodox, Greek Orthodox and Catholic. The main Protestant denominations included Episcopal Anglican Church (EAC), Sudanese Church of God (SCOC), Sudan Presbyterian Evangelical Church (SPEC) and the Presbyterian Church in Sudan. Smaller groups, such as Jehovah’s Witnesses and Seventh-day Adventists also have congregations in the country. Christians are mainly based in urban areas including Khartoum and Port Sudan, as well as the Nuba Mountains.

In 2020, the government rescinded a law which imposed the death penalty for apostasy. However, the criminal code includes a section on ‘religious offences’ which include questioning or criticizing the Koran, insulting Muhammad (or his wives or companions) and insulting any religion.

Reports of persecution have been made. As a minority within a minority, Protestants have experienced oppression in the past, including confiscation and destruction of property. In the 2020s, harassment is mainly in the area of bureaucracy and refusal of planning permissions. In 2021, a member of the Episcopal Church of Sudan was arrested and ill-treated after criticizing officials for not allowing the rebuilding of a SCOC which was burnt down by arsonists. In May 2023, during national unrest, the Anglican cathedral in Khartoum was seized by the RSF while an Evangelical church was bombed. A SPEC church and a Pentecostal church were previously destroyed in early 2022.

== Denominations ==
- Africa Inland Church
- Assemblies of God
- Church of Christ in the Upper Nile
- Sudan Evangelical Presbyterian Church
- Presbyterian Church in Sudan
- Sudan Interior Church
- Sudanese Church of Christ
- Sudan Pentecostal Church
- Sudanese Reformation church of christ

== See also ==
- Religion in Sudan
- Christianity in Sudan
- Catholic Church in Sudan
- Orthodoxy in Sudan
- Religion in South Sudan
- New Sudan Council of Churches
- Episcopal Church of the Sudan

== Sources ==
- Protestantism by country article
- World Christian Encyclopedia, 2001 edition, Volume 1, page 703 (List of denominations)
- Status of religious freedom in Sudan article
