= Christianity in Sudan =

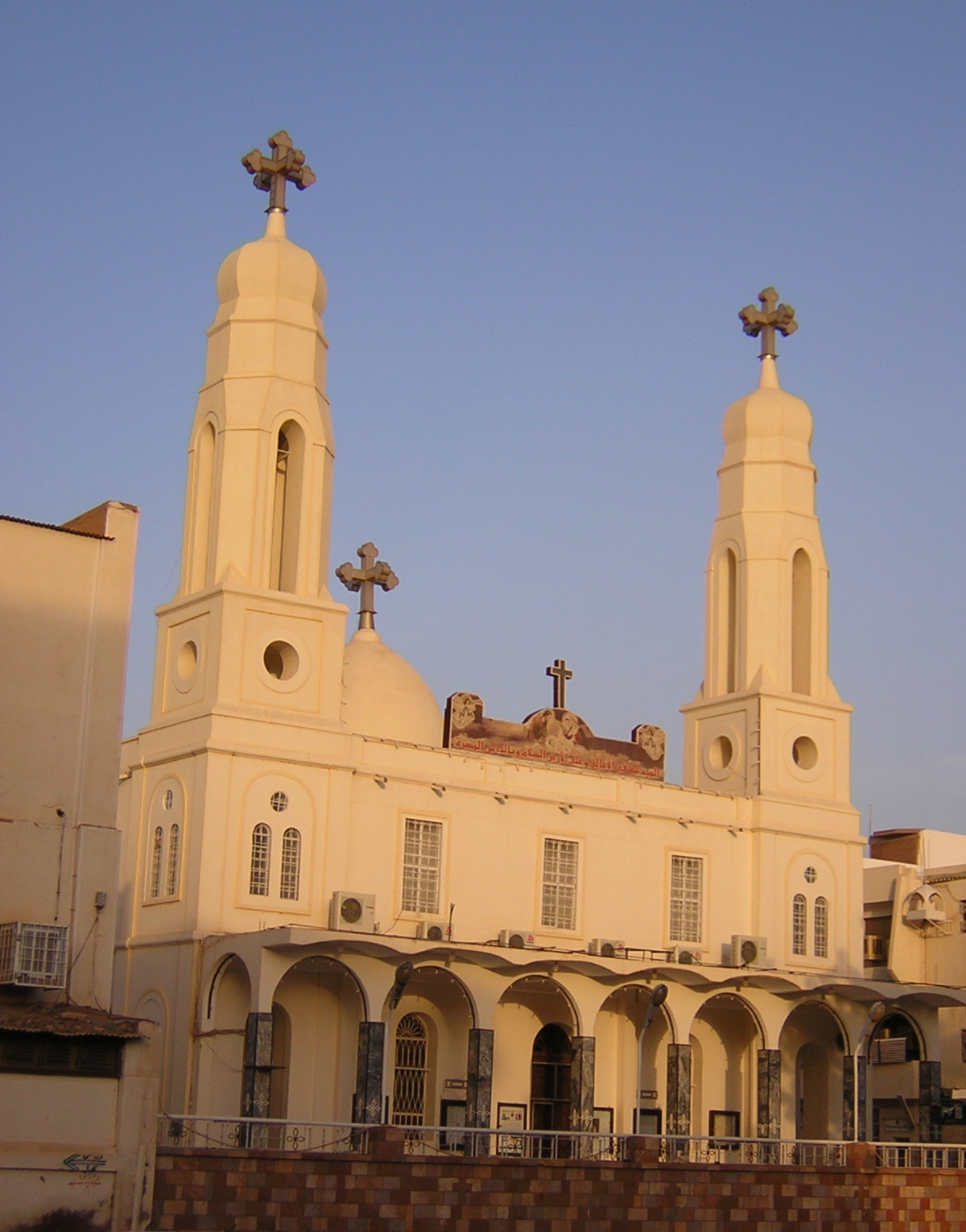
Holy Virgin Mary Coptic Orthodox Cathedral in Khartoum

Christianity in Sudan has a long and rich history, dating back to the early centuries of the Christian era. Ancient Nubia was reached by Coptic Christianity by the 1st century. The Coptic Church was later influenced by Greek Christianity, particularly during the Byzantine era. From the 7th century, the Christian Nubian kingdoms were threatened by the Islamic expansion, but the southernmost of these kingdoms, Alodia, survived until 1504.

Southern Sudan (including what is now South Sudan) remained long dominated by traditional (tribal) religions of the Nilotic peoples, with significant conversion to Christianity during the 20th and 21st centuries.

== History ==
=== Coptic Christianity ===
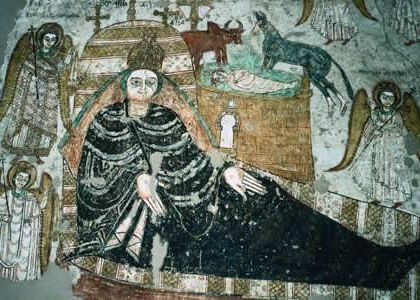
A fresco showing the birth of Jesus, in Faras cathedral

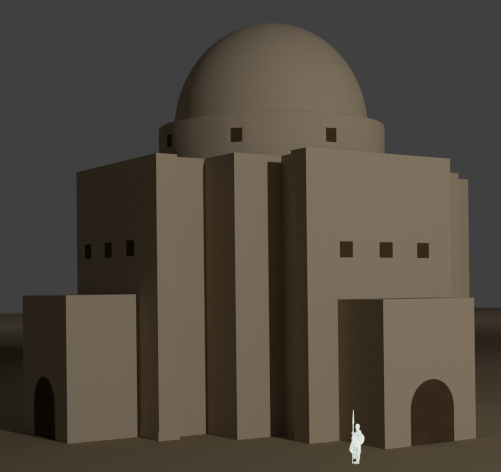
Reconstruction of a church in Old Dongola

Christianity reached the area of present-day northern Sudan, then called Nubia, by the first century after Christ. By tradition St. Matthew the Apostle was said to have visited the region and been active in the establishment of the church south of Aswan. It greatly developed under the influence of the bishops of Alexandria and missionaries form the Eastern Roman Empire. Indeed, forms of Byzantine culture and architecture strongly influenced Nubian Christianity.

The Byzantine Emperor Justinian I (reigned 527 to 565) helped to make Nubia a stronghold of Christianity during the Middle Ages by securing the region with strategic alliances. By 580 AD Christianity had become the official religion of the northern Sudan, centered around the Faras cathedral and Old Dongola.

From the 7th century onwards, the expansion of Islam into northeastern Africa gradually reduced the dominance of Christianity in the region. Nevertheless, Christian Nubian kingdoms such as Makuria and Alodia persisted for several centuries, with both surviving into the Middle Ages.

=== Modern missionary activity ===
During the 19th century, British missionaries re-introduced the Christian faith into South Sudan. British imperial authorities somewhat arbitrarily limited missionary activity to the multi-ethnic southern region. The Church of England and other parts of the Anglican Communion continued to send missionaries and other assistance after the country became independent in 1956, although that also precipitated decades of civil war and persecutions as discussed below.

At the 2011 division which split off South Sudan, over 97% of the population in Sudan in the north, adheres to Islam. Religions followed by the South Sudanese include Christianity (over 60%), traditional indigenous religions and Islam although many Muslims from the south migrated to North Sudan after the independence of South Sudan in 2011. The last census to mention the religion of southerners dates back to 1956 where a majority were classified as following traditional beliefs or were Christian while 18% were Muslim.

Scholarly and some U.S. Department of State sources state that a majority of southern Sudanese maintain traditional indigenous animist beliefs.

Roman Catholic missionaries began work in Sudan in 1842; while Protestantism (both Anglicans and American Presbyterians) began in Sudan in 1899. The Anglicans through the Church Missionary Society had their base in Omdurman, while the Presbyterians began in Khartoum but developed ministry both in the north and in the south. The Sudan Interior Mission began working in the country in 1937. The Africa Inland Mission launched the Africa Inland Church in 1949. In 1964 all foreign missionaries were made to leave southern Sudan because of the civil war. A few groups maintained missionaries in the north. The Sudan Pentecostal Church, which has grown significantly in the south, was started later by the Swedish.

As of 2011, prior to the independence of South Sudan, about 2,009,374 Sudanese practiced Roman Catholicism, mainly in the south (5% of the population were devout Roman Catholics). Nine catholic dioceses include two archdioceses in modern Sudan, with five Cathedrals. The patron saint of the Sudan is the former slave Saint Josephine Bakhita, canonized in 2000.

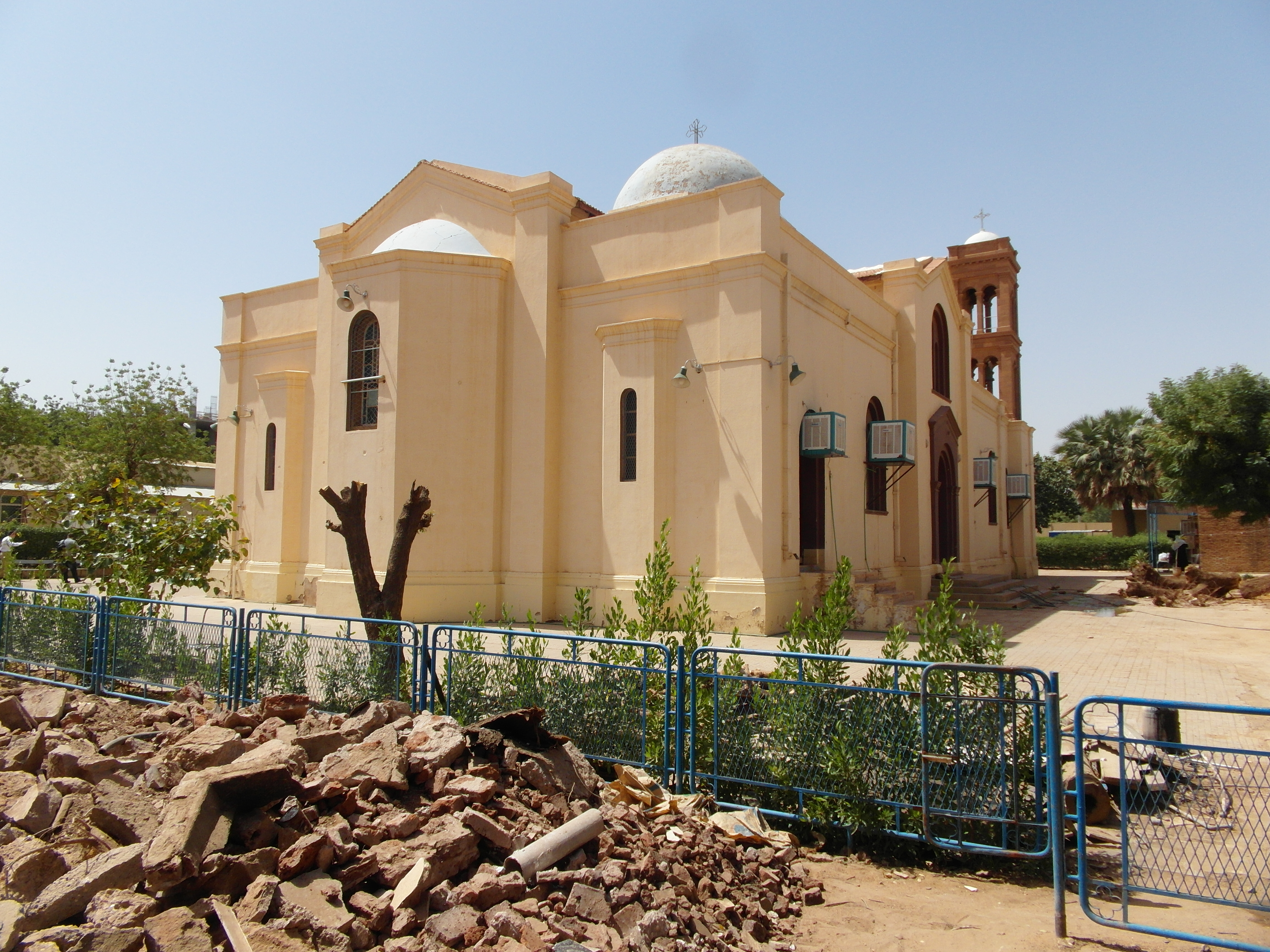
Greek Orthodox Church of the Annunciation, Khartoum

Pope Francis visited South Sudan in February 2023. On the final day of his pilgrimage to the country, the pontiff delivered a powerful message of peace and reconciliation, calling on the people of South Sudan to lay down their weapons of hatred. The visit was well received by the largely Christian population, who hoped for change in a country struggling with conflict and poverty.

In 2025, Multiple Christian organisations issued a joint statement urging the international community to act decisively to bring peace talks to Sudan amid ongoing conflict. They highlighted the dire situation and the underfunding and risks faced by local civil society and community networks. The statement was signed by: ACT Alliance, Caritas Internationalis, World Council of Churches, All Africa Conference of Churches, Association of Member Episcopal Conferences in Eastern Africa, and Caritas Africa.

=== Christianity during Sudanese civil war ===
The Sudanese civil war, which started in 2023 had a deep effect on the small Christian community in Sudan. Many foreign Christians left the country, but some missionaries remained for over a year to minister to the communities they served. One example are the Salesian religious sisters at the Dar Mariam residence, in Shajara, seven kilometres outside of the capital, Khartoum, assisted by Fr Jacob Thelekkadan, a Salesian priest originally from Kerala, in India. The community was in territory controlled by the Sudanese Armed Forces, but surrounded by the Rapid Support Forces. The religious cared for hundreds of residents from Shajara who sought refuge there, according to statements given by Fr Jacob to international charity Aid to the Church in Need. The sisters' house was hit by artillery shells, but fortunately no casualties were recorded. A first evacuation attempt was made by a Red Cross convoy in December 2023, but came under fire and had to retreat. In August 2024 the entire community was evacuated safely by the Sudanese Armed Forces.

At the beginning of the Sudanese Civil War El-Obeid remained under the control of the Sudanese Armed Forces, but was surrounded by the Rapid Support Forces, who shelled the city. In an interview with international charity Aid to the Church in Need, bishop Yunan Andali explained that since the cathedral is located between a military barracks, a police station and a building that belongs to the security forces it was in the hot zone when the war began. He explained that several military sought refuge in the cathedral on the first days of shelling. He also explained that during the war he has continued to offer spiritual and material support to the 300 Catholic families in El-Obeid. The Catholic Church operates six kindergartens, six primary schools and one secondary school in El-Obeid, and these are the only educational institutions that remain open, according to Bishop Tombe, a fact that earned the Church compliments from the authorities.

In June 2025 news emerged of the death of Fr Luka Jomo, a Catholic priest in the city of El Fasher. The priest and two other young people were killed by a stray fire during an attack by the Rapid Support Forces. The Diocese of El-Obeid, which covers El Fasher, confirmed his death, but said in a statement that it did not believe he had been intentionally targeted.

== Demographics ==
About 100,000 people or 0.25% of the population belong to various Protestant denominations in northern Sudan. Catholicism is practised by some thousand followers north of Sudan's capital. A 2015 study estimates some 30,000 Muslims converted to Christianity in Sudan, most of them belonging to some form of Protestantism.

In 2022, Christians made up 5.4% of the country's population. Catholics made up 3.16% of the population.

== Denominations ==
The majority of Christians in Sudan adhere to the Coptic Orthodox, Roman Catholic or Anglican churches (represented by the Episcopal Church of the Sudan), but there are several other small denominations represented there including:

- Africa Inland Church
- Apostolic Church
- Eritrean Orthodox Tewahedo Church
- Ethiopian Orthodox Tewahedo Church
- Greek Orthodox Church
- International church of the Nazarene
- Jehovah's Witnesses
- New Apostolic
- Presbyterian Church of the Sudan
- Seventh Day Adventist Church
- Sudan Presbyterian Evangelical Church
- Sudan Pentecostal Church
- Sudan Interior Church
- Sudan Church of Christ
- The Church of Jesus Christ of Latter-day Saints

== Persecution ==
Sudan's Christians have been persecuted under various military regimes. Sudan's civil wars temporarily ended in 1972, but resumed in 1983, as famine hit the region. Four million people were displaced and two million people died in the two-decade long conflict, before a temporary six-year ceasefire was signed in January 2005.

In May 1983, Sudan's Anglican and Roman Catholic clergy signed a declaration that they would not abandon God, as God had revealed himself to them under threat of Shariah Law. Anti-Christian persecutions grew particularly after 1985, including murders of pastors and church leaders, destruction of Christian villages, as well as churches, hospitals, schools and mission bases, and bombing of Sunday church services. Lands laid waste and where all buildings were demolished included an area the size of Alaska.

Despite the persecutions, Sudanese Christians increased in number from 1.6 million in 1980 to 11 million in 2010. This was despite 22 of the 24 Anglican dioceses operating in exile in Kenya and Uganda, and clergy being unpaid. Four million people remain internally displaced, and another million are in the Sudanese diaspora abroad (of which 400,000 - 600,000 are of the South Sudanese diaspora).

In 2011, South Sudan voted to secede from the north, effective 9 July. Persecution of Christians there had resumed by then.

The Naivasha Agreement technically protects non-Muslims in the north. Some interpretations of Muslim law in Sudan refuse to recognize conversions out of Islam, considering apostacy a crime, and refuse to recognize marriages to non-Muslims.

In 2014, there was controversy over the planned execution of Maryam Yaḥyā Ibrahīm Isḥaq for apostasy. She was later released and after further delays left Sudan.

In 2025, Sudan was ranked as the 5th most dangerous country to be a Christian.

== See also ==
- Early history of Sudan
- Nubia
- Josephine Bakhita
- Religion in Sudan
- Orthodoxy in Sudan
- Catholic Church in Sudan
- Protestantism in Sudan
- Religion in South Sudan

== Bibliography ==
- Maria Alloisio. Bakhita. Editrice La Scuola. Brescia, 1970.
- Grillmeier, Aloys; Hainthaler, Theresia (1996). Christ in Christian Tradition: The Church of Alexandria with Nubia and Ethiopia after 451. Vol. 2/4. Louisville: Westminster John Knox Press. ISBN 9780664223007.
- Jakobielski, S. Christian Nubia at the Height of its Civilization (Chapter 8). UNESCO. University of California Press. San Francisco, 1992 ISBN 978-0-520-06698-4
- Pierli, Francesco, Maria Teresa Ratti, and Andrew C. Wheeler. 1998. Gateway to the Heart of Africa: Missionary Pioneers in Sudan. Nairobi: Paulines Publications in Africa.
