= Religion in Sudan =

Religion in Sudan (2021 Afrobarometer)
1. Islam (97.0%)
2. Christianity (2.20%)
3. Other/None (0.80%)

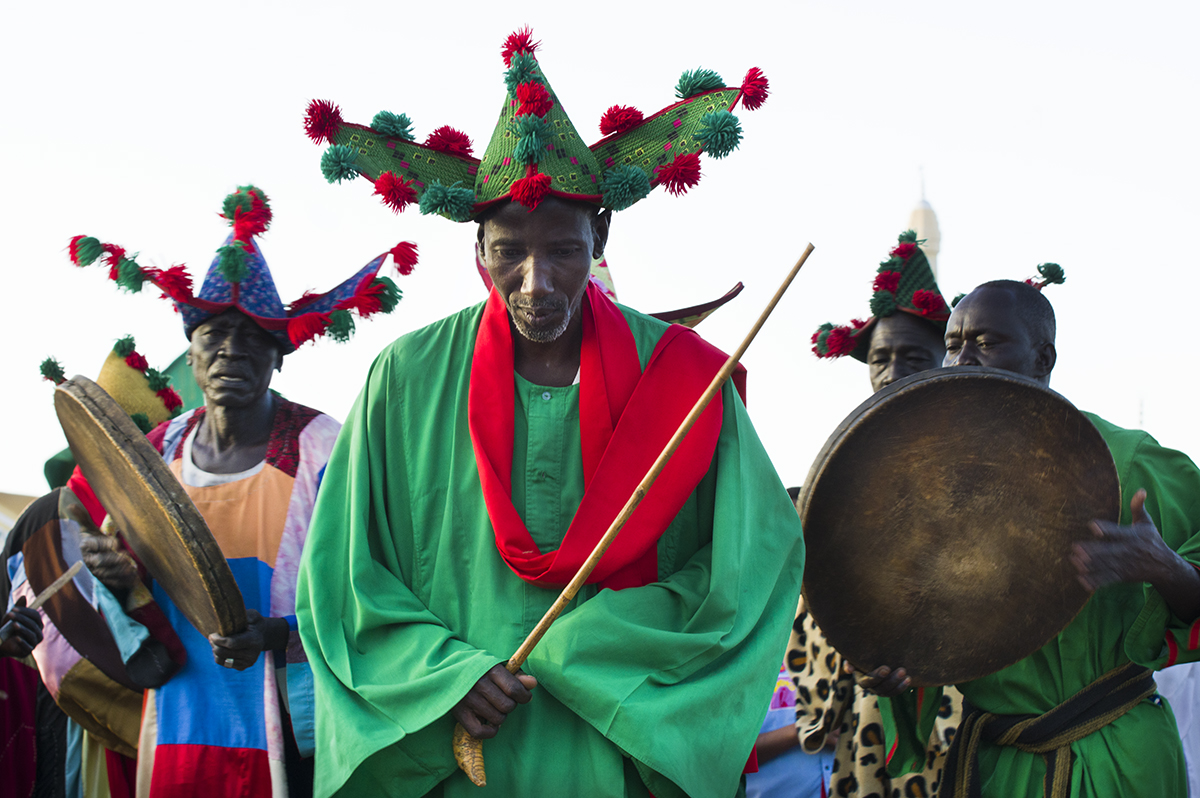
Sufis celebrating Mawlid in Omdurman

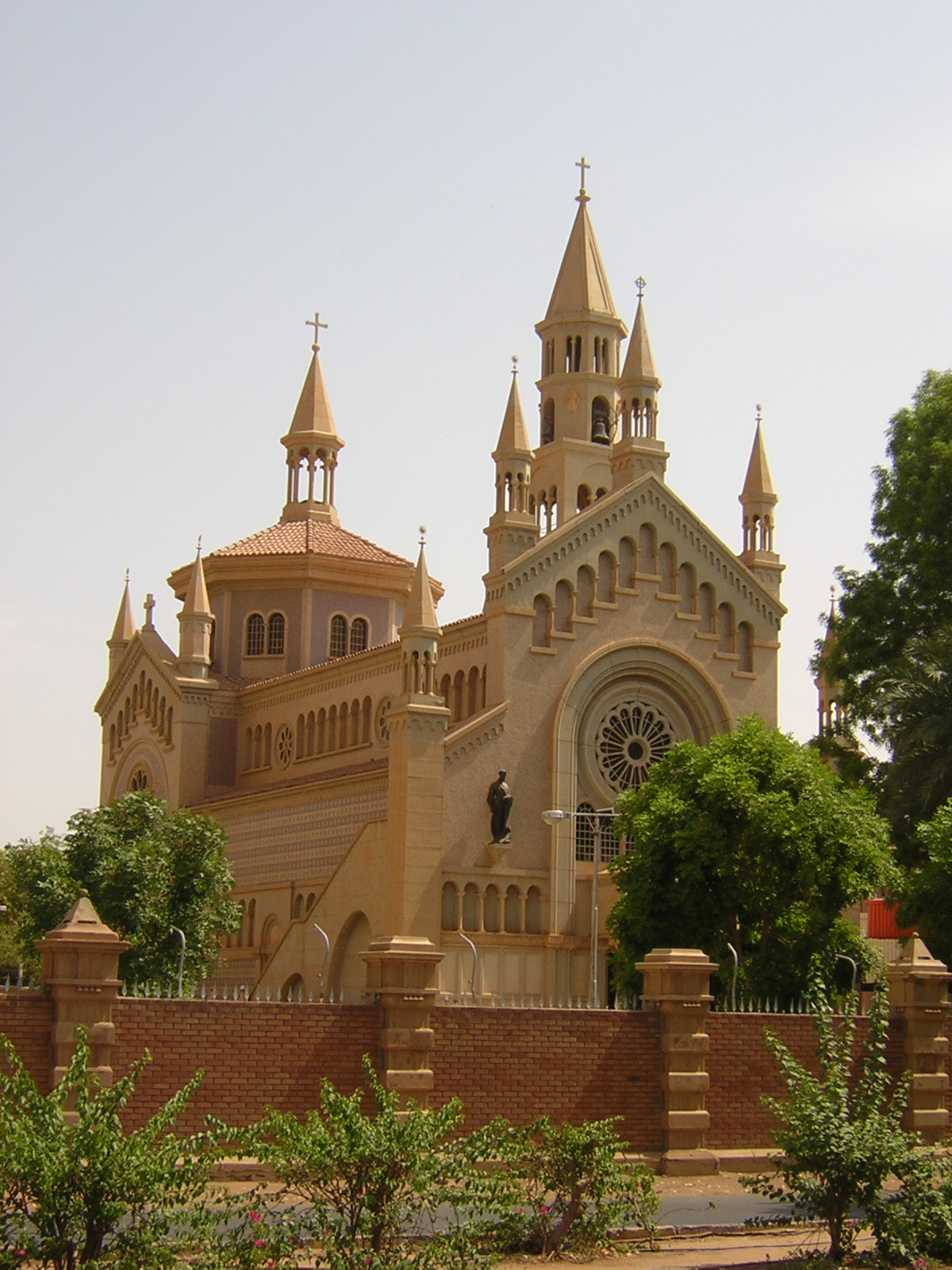
St. Matthew's Cathedral in Khartoum

The predominant religion in Sudan is Islam, practised by around 97% of the total population. Christianity is the second largest religion in the country, accounting for around 2.2% of the population. A minority of Sudanese adhere to indigenous beliefs, primarily in the Nuba Mountains . Prior to the arrival of Islam and Christianity, the polytheistic Kushite religion was the dominant faith in ancient Nubia, part of modern-day Sudan. Lasting until the fourth century CE, the Kushite religion featured a pantheon of local deities such as Apedemak and some ancient Egyptian deities, including Amun.

Between the fifth to twelve centuries, the medieval Christian kingdoms of Nubia controlled present-day Sudan and delayed the expansion of Islam through a peace and trade treaty, known as the Baqt, with the ruling Muslim power in Cairo. Following the fall of the Christian kingdoms in the sixteenth century, Islam spread to Nubia peacefully when Muslim Kenzi preachers and merchants intermarried with Christian Danagla. In 1504, the native Funj Sultanate would be the first Muslim polity established in the region, attracting Sufi scholars and religious teachers from Egypt and the Hejaz. By the seventeenth century, western Sudan would come under the Islamic rule of the Sultanate of Darfur, another indigenous state.

The religious composition of northern Sudan would gradually shift from Coptic Christianity and traditional religions to Islam, with numerous indigenous groups such as the Nubians, Beja, Nuba, Fur, and Zaghawa largely converting to Islam over time. In the 1800s, both the Funj and Darfur Sultanates would collapse in the wake of Turco-Egyptian invasions. The early nineteenth century also saw the immigration of many Egyptian Copts to the country, and despite initially facing tolerant treatment, were persecuted by the Mahdist State by the end of that century. A variety of Christian denominations would be introduced to the Nuba Mountains and southern Sudan during the colonial era.

In 2020, the Sudanese transitional government signed an accord with the political and armed group Sudan People's Liberation Movement–North (SPLM–N), which officially separated religion and the state.

== Islam ==
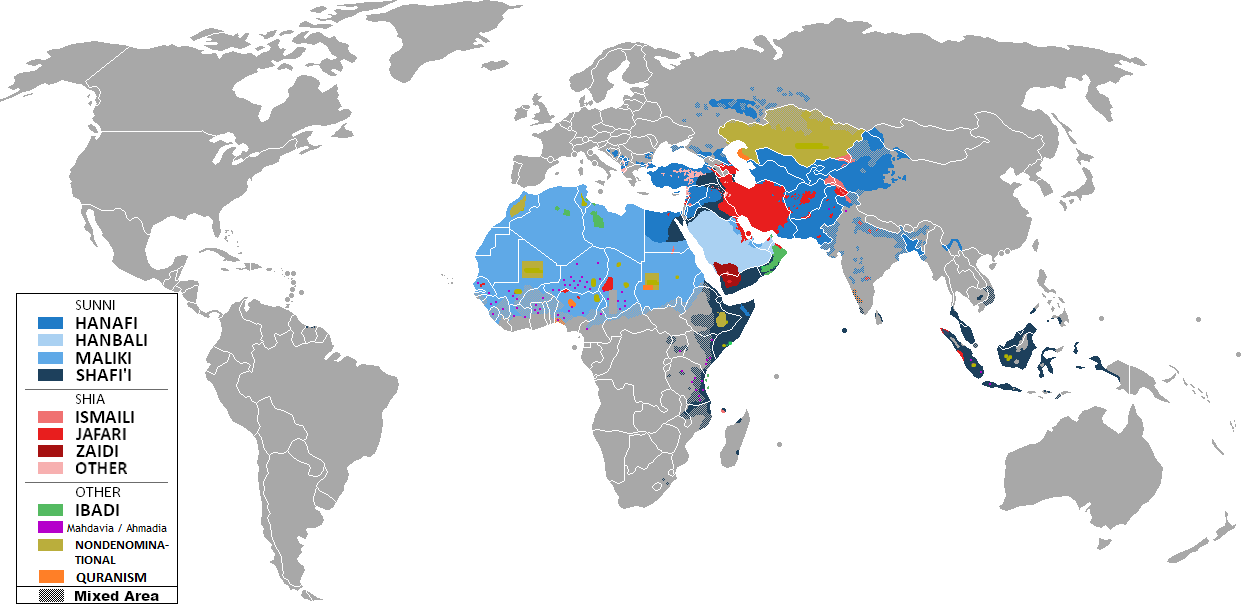
Sudan is mostly Maliki (baby blue).

Up until 2010 (before the secession of South Sudan in 2011), the country was 80% Muslim; as of 2015, the proportion grew to 97%. Most Sudanese Muslims are adherents of the Sunni branch of Islam, with the vast majority following the Maliki school, although Shafi'i and Hanafi schools are also present.

Sunni Islam in Sudan is not marked by a uniform body of belief and practice, however. Some Muslims opposed aspects of Sunni orthodoxy, and rites having a non-Islamic origin were widespread, being accepted as if they were integral to Islam, or sometimes being recognized as separate. A great majority of Muslims in Sudan adhere to Sufism or are heavily influenced by it, making Sudan one of the most tolerant Muslim majority countries in the world.

=== Five pillars ===
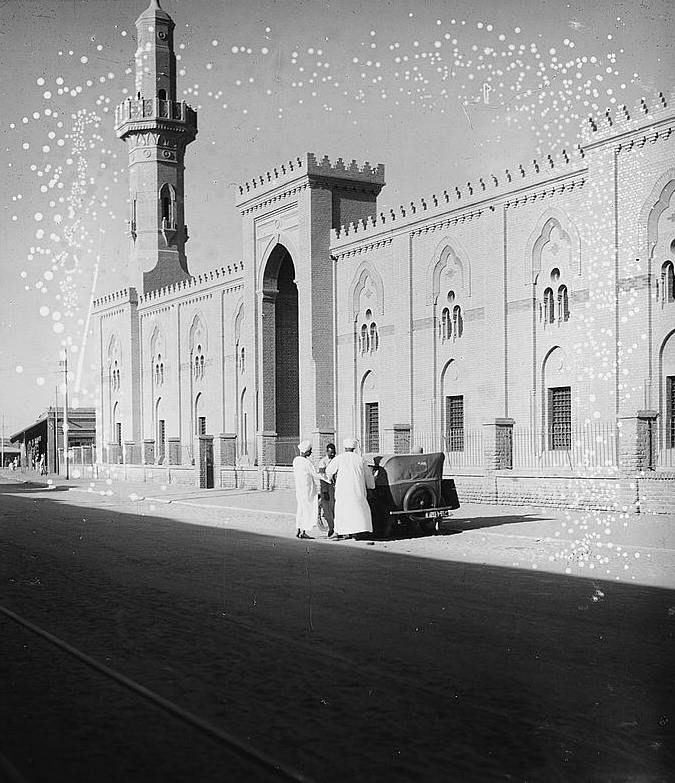
Omdurman Main Mosque in 1936

Sunni Islam requires of the faithful five fundamental obligations that constitute the Five Pillars of Islam. The first pillar, the shahadah or profession of faith is the affirmation "There is no deity but God, and Muhammad is His messenger." It is the first step in becoming a Muslim. The second obligation is prayer at five specified times of the day. The third enjoins almsgiving. The fourth requires fasting during daylight hours in the month of Ramadan. The fifth requires a pilgrimage to Mecca for those able to perform it, to participate in the special rites that occur during the twelfth month of the lunar calendar.

Most Sudanese Muslims are born to the faith and meet the first requirement. Many males in the cities and larger towns manage to pray five times a day: at dawn, noon, mid afternoon, sundown, and evening. The well-to-do perform little work during Ramadan, and many businesses close or operate on reduced schedules. In the early 1990s, its observance appeared to be widespread, especially in urban areas and among sedentary Sudanese Muslims.

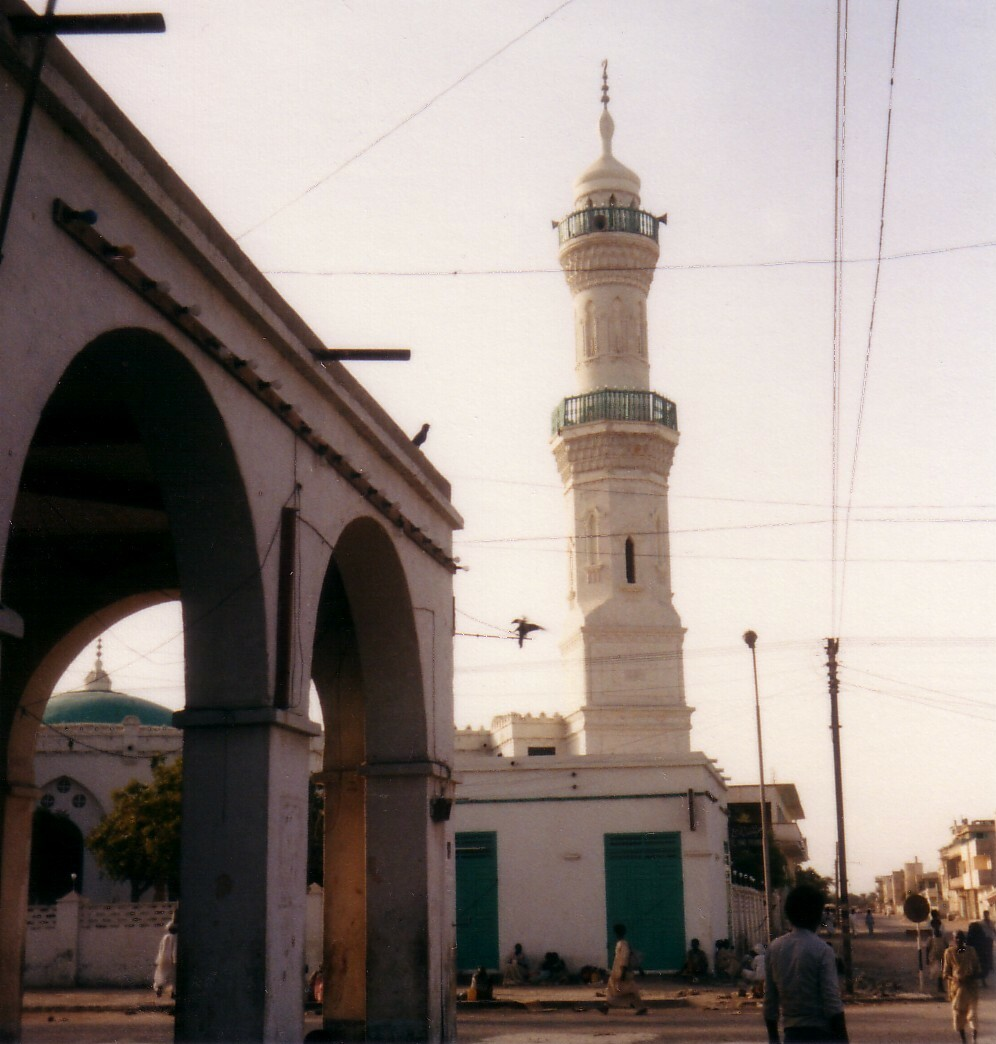
A minaret in Port Sudan

The pilgrimage to Mecca is less costly and arduous for the Sudanese than it is for many Muslims. Nevertheless, it takes time (or money if travel is by air), and the ordinary Sudanese Muslim has generally found it difficult to accomplish, rarely undertaking it before middle age. Some have joined pilgrimage societies into which members pay a small amount monthly and choose one of their number when sufficient funds have accumulated to send someone on the pilgrimage. A returned pilgrim is entitled to use the honorific title hajj or hajjih for a woman.

Another ceremony commonly observed is the great feast Id al Adha (also known as Id al Kabir), representing the sacrifice made during the last days of the pilgrimage. The centerpiece of the day is the slaughter of a sheep, which is distributed to the poor, kin, neighbors, and friends, as well as the immediate family.

Islam imposes a standard of conduct encouraging generosity, fairness, and honesty towards other Muslims. Sudanese Arabs, especially those who are wealthy, are expected by their coreligionists to be generous.

=== Islam in Sudanese law ===
In accordance with Islamic law Sudanese Muslims do not eat pork nor do they consume alcohol. Usury is also forbidden by Islamic law, but Islamic banks have developed other ways of making money available to the public.

In Sudan (until 1983) modern criminal and civil, including commercial, law generally prevailed. In the north, however, the sharia was expected to govern what is usually called family and personal law, i.e., matters such as marriage, divorce, and inheritance. In the towns and in some sedentary communities sharia was accepted, but in other sedentary communities and among nomads local custom was likely to prevail – particularly with respect to inheritance.

In September 1983, Nimeiri imposed the sharia throughout the land, eliminating the civil and penal codes by which the country had been governed in the twentieth century. Traditional Islamic punishments were imposed for theft, adultery, homicide, and other crimes. The zealousness with which these punishments were carried out contributed to the fall of Nimeiri. Minority rights are severely restricted under Sharia.

In July 2020, a number of these laws were repealed, including the one that had provided for the death sentence for apostasy, the renouncement of Islam by a Muslim.

=== Other influences ===
Islam is a monotheistic religion and insists that there can be no intercessors between an individual and God. Nevertheless, Sudanese Islam includes a belief in spirits as sources of illness or other afflictions and in magical ways of dealing with them. The imam of a mosque is a prayer leader and preacher of sermons. He may also be a teacher and in smaller communities combines both functions. In the latter role, he is called a faqih (pl., fuqaha), although a faqih need not be an imam. In addition to teaching in the local Qur'anic school (khalwa), the faqih is expected to write texts (from the Qur'an) or magical verses to be used as amulets and cures. His blessing may be asked at births, marriages, deaths, and other important occasions, and he may participate in wholly non-Islamic harvest rites in some remote places. All of these functions and capacities make the faqih the most important figure in popular Islam. But he is not a priest. His religious authority is based on his putative knowledge of the Qur'an, the sharia, and techniques for dealing with occult threats to health and well-being. The notion that the words of the Qur'an will protect against the actions of evil spirits or the evil eye is deeply embedded in popular Islam, and the amulets prepared by the faqih are intended to protect their wearers against these dangers.

In Sudan as in much of African Islam, the cult of the saint is of considerable importance, although some Muslims would reject it. The development of the cult is closely related to the presence of the religious orders; many who came to be considered saints on their deaths were founders or leaders of religious orders who in their lifetimes were thought to have barakah, a state of blessedness implying a spiritual power inherent in the religious office. Baraka intensifies after death as the deceased becomes a wali (literally friend of God, but in this context translated as saint). The tomb and other places associated with the saintly being become the loci of the person's baraka, and in some views he or she becomes the guardian spirit of the locality. The intercession of the wali is sought on a variety of occasions, particularly by those seeking cures or by barren women desiring children. A saint's annual holy day is the occasion of a local festival that may attract a large gathering.

Better-educated Muslims in Sudan may participate in prayer at a saint's tomb but argue that prayer is directed only to God. Many others, however, see the saint not merely as an intercessor with and an agent of God, but also as a nearly autonomous source of blessing and power, thereby approaching "popular" as opposed to orthodox Islam.

=== Movements and religious orders ===
Islam made its deepest and longest lasting impact in Sudan through the activity of the Islamic religious brotherhoods or orders. These orders emerged in the Middle East in the twelfth century in connection with the development of Sufism, a reaction based in mysticism to the strongly legalistic orientation of mainstream Islam. These orders first came to Sudan in the sixteenth century and became significant in the eighteenth. Sufism seeks its adherents a closer personal relationship with God through special spiritual disciplines. The exercises (or dhikr) include reciting prayers and passages of the Qur'an and repeating the names, or attributes, of God while performing physical movements according to the formula established by the founder of the particular order. Singing and dancing may be introduced. The outcome of an exercise, which lasts much longer than the usual daily prayer, is often a state of ecstatic abandon.

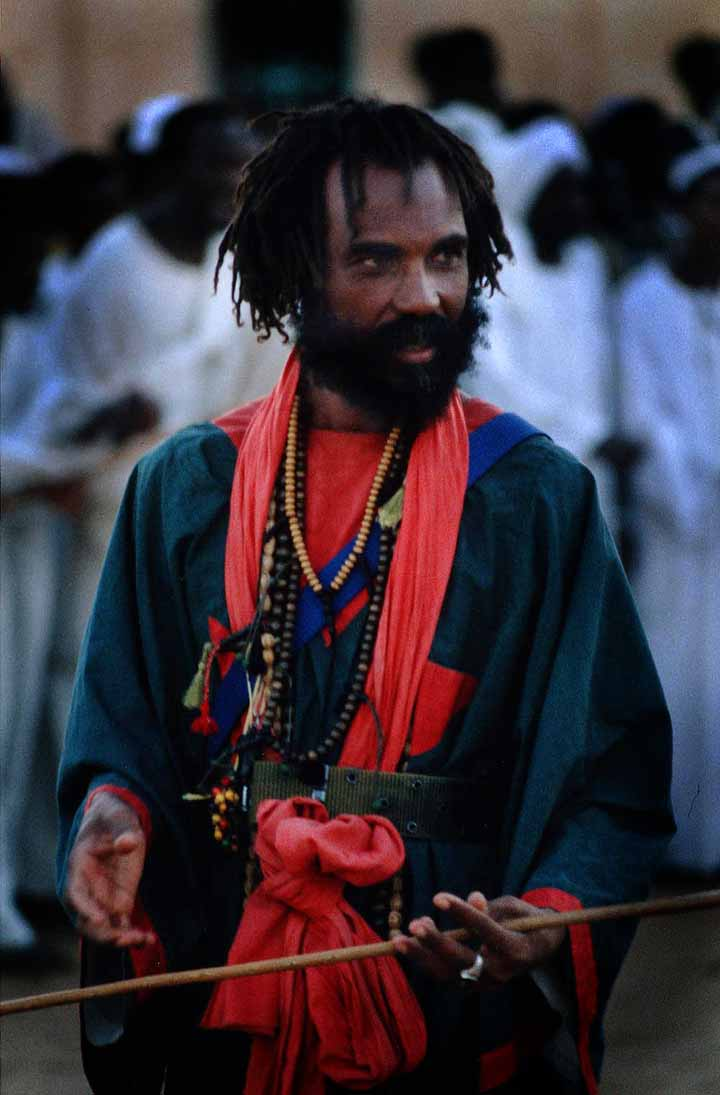
A dervish

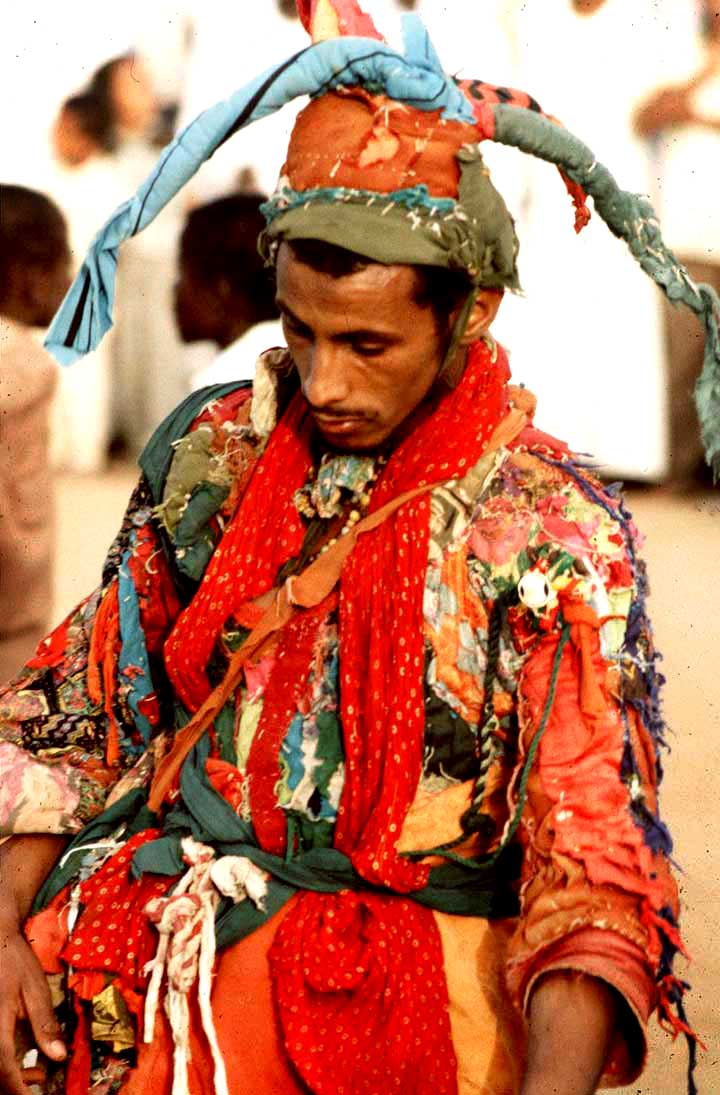
A Dancing dervish

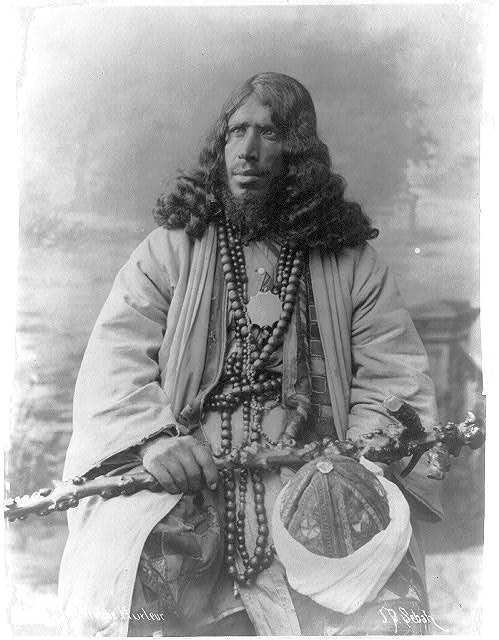
A dervish from the 1920s

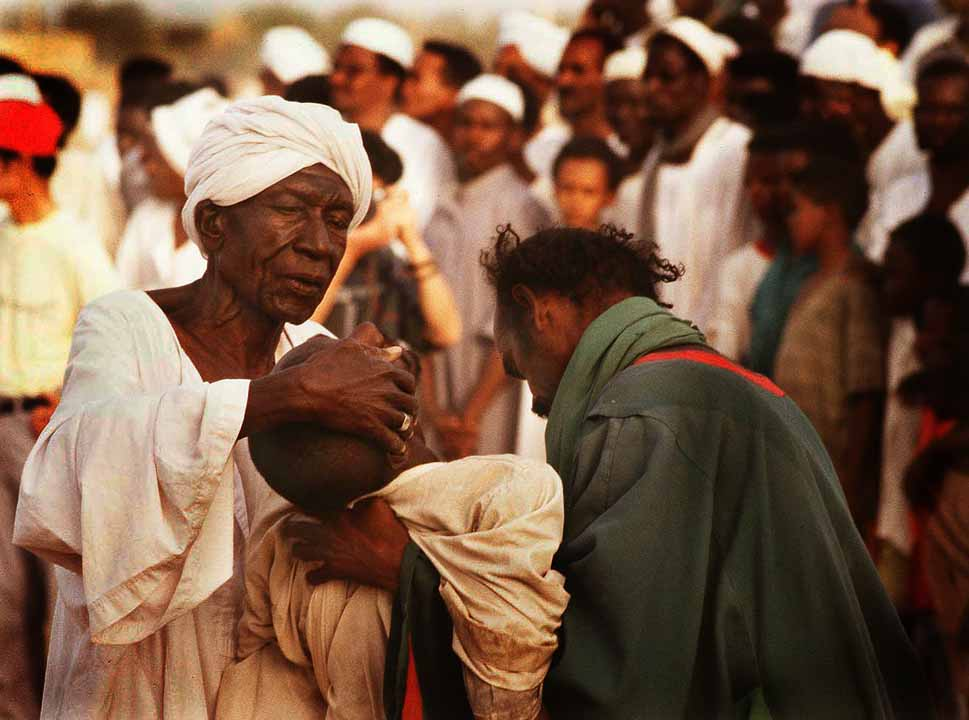
Sufis performing a ritual in Khartoum

A mystical or devotional way (sing. tariqa; pl. turuq) is the basis for the formation of particular orders, each of which is also called a tariqa. The specialists in religious law and learning initially looked askance at Sufism and the Sufi orders, but the leaders of Sufi orders in Sudan have won acceptance by acknowledging the significance of the sharia and not claiming that Sufism replaces it.

The principal turuq varies considerably in their practice and internal organization. Some orders are tightly organized in a hierarchical fashion; others have allowed their local branches considerable autonomy. There may be as many as a dozen Turuq in Sudan. Some are restricted to that country; others are widespread in Africa or the Middle East. Several Turuq, for all practical purposes independent, are offshoots of older orders and were established by men who altered in major or minor ways the tariqa of the orders to which they had formerly been attached.

The oldest and most widespread of the turuq is the Qadiriyah founded by Abdul Qadir Jilani in Baghdad in the twelfth century and introduced into Sudan in the sixteenth. The Qadiriyah's principal rival and the largest tariqa in the western part of the country was the Tijaniyah, a sect begun by Sidi Ahmed al-Tidjani at Tijani in Morocco, which eventually penetrated Sudan in about 1810 via the western Sahel (a narrow band of savanna bordering the southern Sahara, stretching across Africa). Many Tijani became influential in Darfur, and other adherents settled in northern Kurdufan. Later on, a class of Tijani merchants arose as markets grew in towns and trade expanded, making them less concerned with providing religious leadership. Of greater importance to Sudan was the tariqa established by the followers of Sayyid Ahmad ibn Idris, known as Al Fasi, who died in 1837. Although he lived in Arabia and never visited Sudan, his students spread into the Nile Valley establishing indigenous Sudanese orders which include the Majdhubiyah, the Idrisiyah, the Ismailiyah, and the Khatmiyyah.

Much different in organization from the other brotherhoods is the Khatmiyyah (or Mirghaniyah after the name of the order's founder). Established in the early nineteenth century by Muhammad Uthman al Mirghani, it became the best organized and most politically oriented and powerful of the turuq in eastern Sudan (see Turkiyah). Mirghani had been a student of Sayyid Ahmad ibn Idris and had joined several important orders, calling his own order the seal of the paths (Khatim at Turuq—hence Khatmiyyah). The salient features of the Khatmiyyah are the extraordinary status of the Mirghani family, whose members alone may head the order; loyalty to the order, which guarantees paradise; and the centralized control of the order's branches.

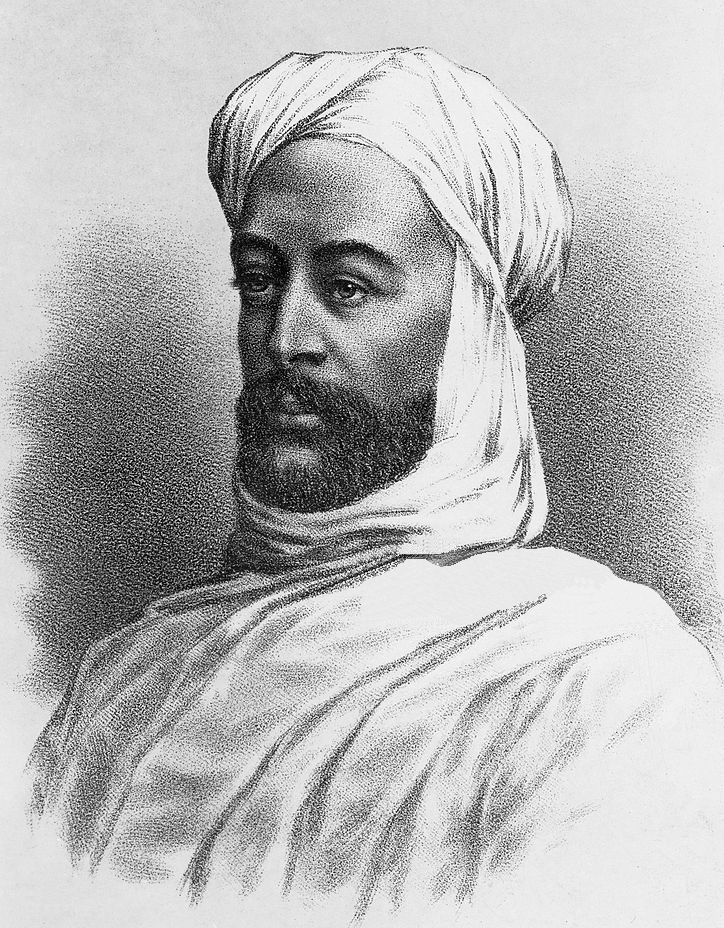
Muhammad Ahmad

The Khatmiyyah had its center in the southern section of Ash Sharqi State and its greatest following in eastern Sudan and in portions of the riverine area. The Mirghani family were able to turn the Khatmiyyah into a political power base, despite its broad geographical distribution, because of the tight control they exercised over their followers. Moreover, gifts from followers over the years have given the family and the order the wealth to organize politically. This power did not equal, however, that of the Mirghanis' principal rival, the Ansar, or followers of the Mahdi, whose present-day leader was Sadiq al-Mahdi, the great-grandson of Muhammad Ahmad, who drove the Egyptian administration from Sudan in 1885.

Most other orders were either smaller or less well organized than the Khatmiyyah. Moreover, unlike many other African Muslims, Sudanese Muslims did not all seem to feel the need to identify with one or another tariqa, even if the affiliation were nominal. Many Sudanese Muslims preferred more political movements that sought to change Islamic society and governance to conform to their own visions of the true nature of Islam.

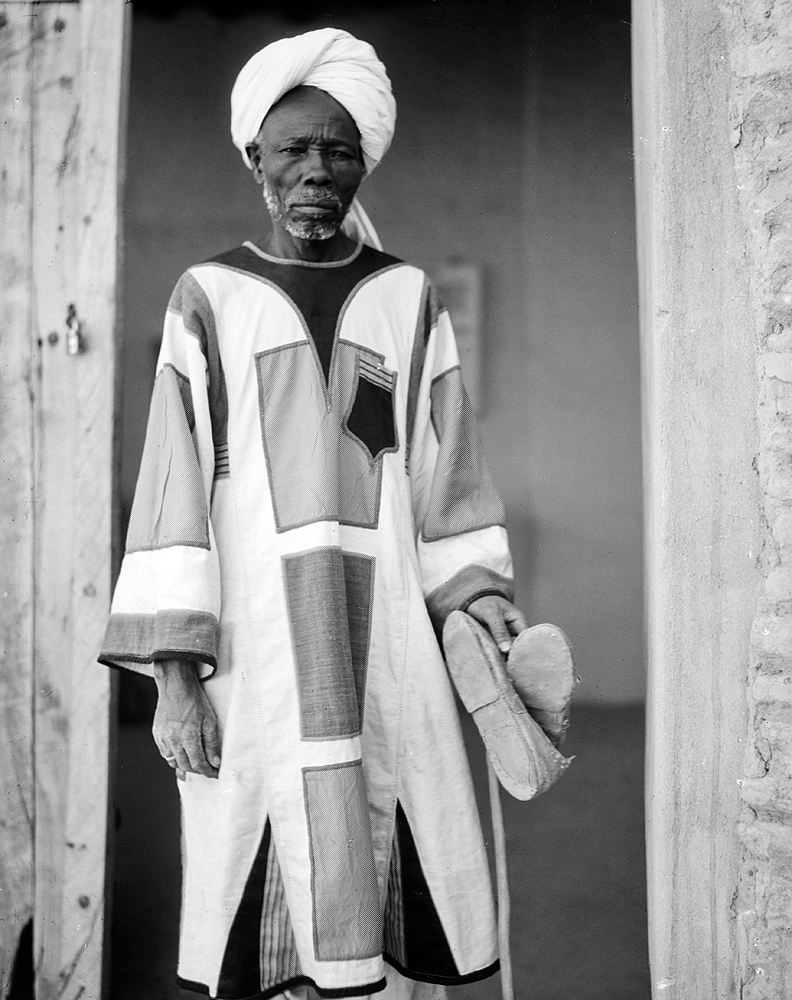
A Mahdist in Omdurman, 1936

One of these movements, Mahdism, was founded in the late nineteenth century. It has been likened to a religious order, but it is not a tariqa in the traditional sense. Mahdism and its adherents, the Ansar, sought the regeneration of Islam, and in general were critical of the turuq. Muhammad Ahmad ibn as Sayyid Abd Allah, a faqih, proclaimed himself to be al-Mahdi al-Muntazar ("the awaited guide in the right path"), the messenger of God and representative of the Prophet Muhammad, an assertion that became an article of faith among the Ansar. He was sent, he said, to prepare the way for the second coming of the Prophet Isa (Jesus) and the impending end of the world. In anticipation of Judgment Day, it was essential that the people return to a simple and rigorous, even puritanical Islam (see Mahdiyah). The idea of the coming of a Mahdi has roots in Sunni Islamic traditions. The issue for Sudanese and other Muslims was whether Muhammad Ahmad was, in fact, the Mahdi.

In the century since the Mahdist uprising, the neo-Mahdist movement, and the Ansar, supporters of Mahdism from the west, have persisted as a political force in Sudan. Many groups, from the Baqqara cattle nomads to the largely sedentary tribes on the White Nile, supported this movement. The Ansar were hierarchically organized under the control of Muhammad Ahmad's successors, who have all been members of the Mahdi family (known as the ashraf). The ambitions and varying political perspectives of different members of the family have led to internal conflicts, and it appeared that Sadiq al-Mahdi, the putative leader of the Ansar since the early 1970s, did not enjoy the unanimous support of all Mahdists. Mahdist family political goals and ambitions seemed to have taken precedence over the movement's original religious mission. The modern-day Ansar were thus loyal more to the political descendants of the Mahdi than to the religious message of Mahdism.

A movement that spread widely in Sudan in the 1960s, responding to the efforts to secularize Islamic society, was the Muslim Brotherhood (Al Ikhwan al Muslimin). Originally the Muslim Brotherhood, often known simply as the Brotherhood, was conceived as a religious revivalist movement that sought to return to the fundamentals of Islam in a way that would be compatible with the technological innovations introduced from the West. Disciplined, highly motivated, and well-financed the Brotherhood became a powerful political force during the 1970s and 1980s, although it represented only a small minority of Sudanese. In the government that was formed in June 1989, following a bloodless coup d'état, the Brotherhood exerted influence through its political wing, the National Islamic Front (NIF) party, which included several cabinet members among its adherents.

== Christianity ==
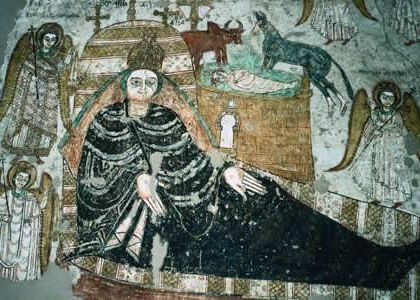
A fresco showing the birth of Jesus, in Faras cathedral

Sudan was predominantly Coptic Christian at the time of the arrival of Islam in the seventh and eighth century. Medieval Nubia was ruled by native Christian kingdoms for around seven centuries, preventing the spread of Islam in that time. The Coptic presence in Sudan dates from 1,300 years ago, though many are descended from more recent Egyptian artisans and merchants who immigrated to Sudan during the early 19th century. Copts or adherents of the Egyptian Coptic Church in Sudan number upward of 400,000–500,000 followers, and they have historically faced persecution. Although Copts had initially received tolerant treatment in Sudan, many were forced to renounce their faith in favour of Islam and intermarry with Sudanese people under the rule of the Mahdist State (1881-98). The Anglo-Egyptian invasion afforded Copts greater religious and economic liberties, enabling them to enter sectors like banking, engineering, medicine, and the civil service.

The Coptic Orthodox Church of Alexandria's influence is still marginally present in Sudan, with several hundred thousand remaining adherents. In 2011, the predominantly Christian areas in South Sudan seceded to form a new country. Christians in the Nuba Mountains, which the Sudanese government retained for the region's mineral wealth, remain particularly subject to persecution. The Sudanese government's military actions against the Nuba people have been labeled ethnic cleansing.

=== Roman Catholicism ===
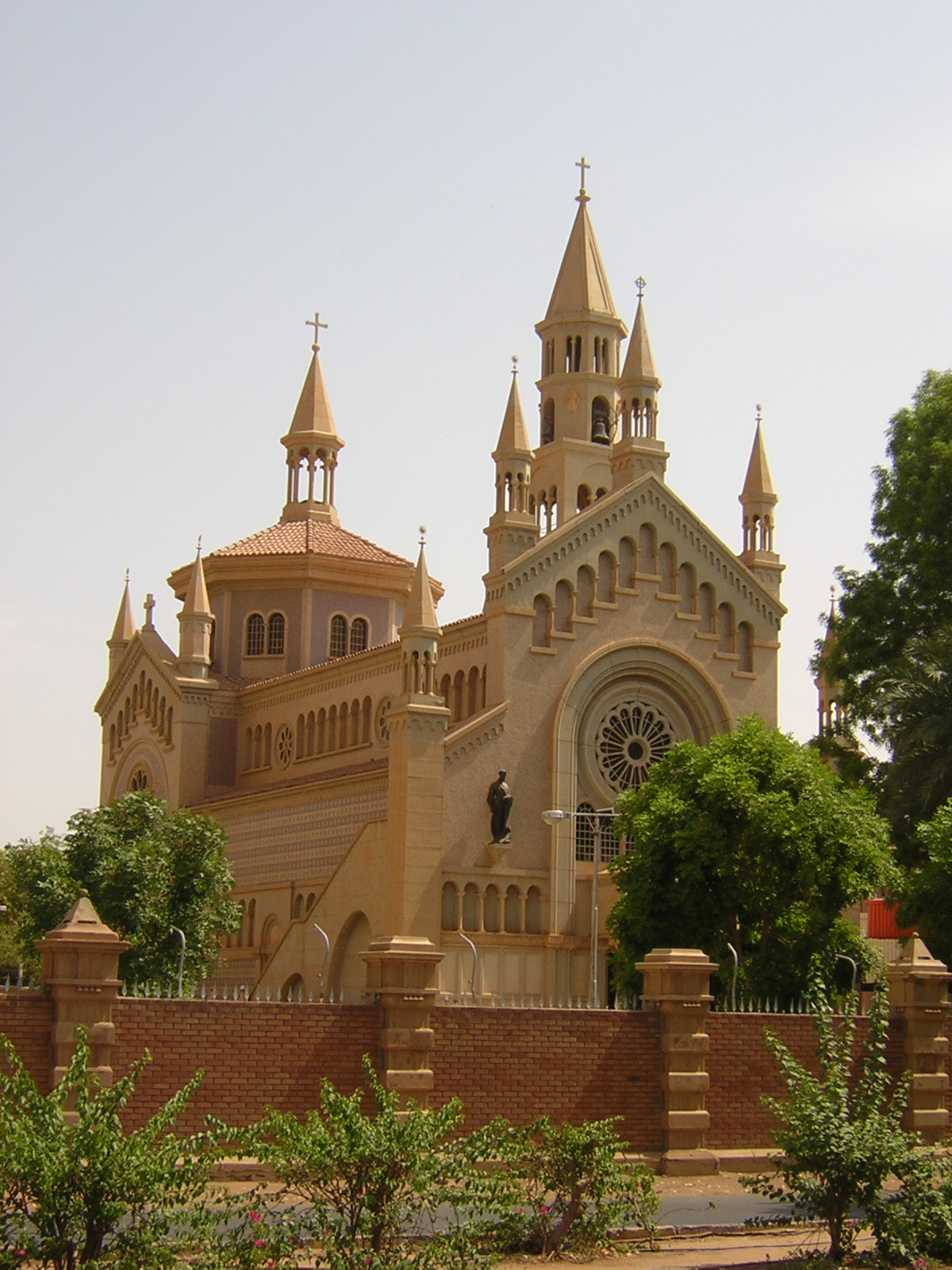
St. Matthew's Catholic Cathedral, Khartoum

There were approximately 1.1 million Catholics in (pre-partition) Sudan, about 3.2 percent of the total population. Sudan forms one ecclesiastical province, consisting of one archdiocese (the Archdiocese of Khartoum) and one suffragan diocese (the diocese of El Obeid). The vast majority of Sudan's Catholics ended up in South Sudan after the partition.

== Indigenous religions ==
Each indigenous religion is unique to a specific ethnic group or part of a group, although several groups may share elements of belief and ritual because of common ancestry or mutual influence. The group serves as the congregation, and an individual usually belongs to that faith by virtue of membership in the group. Believing and acting in a religious mode is part of daily life and is linked to the social, political, and economic actions and relationships of the group. The beliefs and practices of indigenous religions in Sudan are not systematized, in that the people do not generally attempt to put together in a coherent fashion the doctrines they hold and the rituals they practice.

The concept of a high spirit or divinity, usually seen as a creator and sometimes as ultimately responsible for the actions of lesser spirits, is common to most Sudanese groups. Often the higher divinity is remote, and believers treat the other spirits as autonomous, orienting their rituals to these spirits rather than to the high god. Such spirits may be perceived as forces of nature or as manifestations of ancestors. Spirits may intervene in people's lives, either because individuals or groups have transgressed the norms of the society or because they have failed to pay adequate attention to the ritual that should be addressed to the spirits.

The notions of sorcery are to be found in varying forms among peoples, including nomadic and other Arabs, who consider themselves Muslims. A specific belief widespread among Arabs and other Muslim peoples is the notion of the evil eye. Although a physiological peculiarity of the eye (walleye or cross-eye) may be considered indicative of the evil eye, any persons expressing undue interest in the private concerns of another may be suspected of inflicting deliberate harm by a glance. Unlike most witchcraft, where the perpetrator is known by and often close to the victim, the evil eye is usually attributed to strangers. Children are thought to be the most vulnerable.

Ways exist to protect oneself against sorcery or the evil eye. Many magico-religious specialists—diviners and sorcerers—deal with these matters in Sudanese societies. The diviner is able to determine whether witchcraft or sorcery is responsible for the affliction and to discover the source. He also protects and cures by providing amulets and other protective devices for a fee or by helping a victim punish (in occult fashion) the sorcerer in order to be cured of the affliction. If it is thought that an evil spirit has possessed a person, an exorcist may be called in. In some groups these tasks may be accomplished by the same person; in others, the degree of specialization may be greater. In northern Sudan among Muslim peoples, the faqih may spend more of his time as the diviner, dispenser of amulets, healer, and exorcist than as Qur'anic teacher, imam of a mosque, or mystic.

== Irreligion ==
The true number of atheists or agnostics in Sudan is unknown, due to fear and prejudice suffered by non-Muslims. Prior to July 2020, when Sudan's law against apostasy was repealed, atheists faced the death penalty if they were born to a Muslim father, or had accepted Islam at some point and then renounced it.

== Hinduism ==
According to ARDA, Sudan had 864 Hindus in the year 2020.

== Statistics ==
=== Censuses ===
According to the 1993 census, North Sudan was 96.4% Muslim, up from an estimated 90.9% in 1956. The 1993 census only collected data on religious affiliation in Northern Sudan because of the civil war in what would become South Sudan. The 1956 census did not collect data on religious affiliation; however, estimates have been made using ethnic identity as a proxy for religious identity. Some groups, such as the Arabs and Nubians, are predominantly Muslim while some like the Nuba include Christians or adherent to traditional religions. A more recent census in 2008 also refrained from collecting information on the population's religious affiliation.

Religion in North Sudan
Religion	1993 Census	
Religion	#	%
Muslim	20,495,781	96.4
Christian	686,474	3.2
Other	76,210	0.4
Unknown	8,176	0.0
Total	21,266,641	100

== Religious freedom ==
Although the 2005 Interim National Constitution (INC) provides for freedom of religion throughout the entire country of Sudan, the INC enshrined Shari'a as a source of legislation in the north and the official laws and policies of the government favor Islam in Sudan of today.

== See also ==
- Islam in Sudan
- Sunni Islam in Sudan
- Christianity in Sudan
- Orthodoxy in Sudan
- Catholic Church in Sudan
- Protestantism in Sudan
