= Sudanese teddy bear blasphemy case =

2007 trial of British schoolteacher in Sudan

The Sudanese teddy bear blasphemy case concerns the 2007 arrest, trial, conviction, imprisonment, and subsequent release of British schoolteacher Gillian Gibbons, who taught children of middle-class Muslim and Christian families at Unity High School in Khartoum, Sudan. She was convicted of insulting Islam by allowing her class of six-year-olds to name a teddy bear "Muhammad".

== Arrest ==
Gillian Gibbons was born in 1953 and gained a Bachelor of Education degree from the C.F. Mott College of Education in Prescot in 1975 (the college closed in 1992). She later moved to Sudan for a teaching job in Unity High School.

In one class, she held an activity where a teddy bear was used as a teaching tool, asking six-year-old pupils to select a name for it. With possible names being collected on a list, a boy named Muhammad added his own name. The class agreed to use the name Muhammad, on account of the name being a very common one. Gillian was later arrested for allegedly insulting Islam.

While it was initially thought that the complaint had originated from a parent of one of the children at the school, the boy's own parents as well as those of the other pupils, and the teaching assistant, who was an adherent of Islam defended Gibbons. However, it was later revealed that an office assistant employed at the school, Sara Khawad, had filed the complaint and was the key witness for the prosecution. Khawad was said to be angry with the school's head teacher. "I was used by the secretary to get at the school", Gibbons told The Guardian shortly after her release.

Sudan's legal system is strongly influenced by sharia, which prohibits depictions of Muhammad and other prophets. However, many Muslim organizations in other countries publicly condemned the Sudanese over their reactions, as Gibbons did not set out to cause offence. The chairman of the Unity School council, Ezikiel Kondo, indicated that he perceived ulterior motives in the affair: "The thing may be very simple, but they just may make it bigger. It's a kind of blackmail."

== Conviction and reaction ==
On 25 November 2007, Gibbons was arrested, interrogated and then put in a cell at a local police station. On 28 November, it was reported that she had been formally charged under Section 125 of the Sudanese Criminal Act, for "insulting religion, inciting hatred, sexual harassment, racism, prostitution and showing contempt for religious beliefs". This carries a maximum sentence of imprisonment, a fine, or 40 lashes. On 29 November 2007, Gibbons was found guilty of "insulting religion", one of the three counts against her, and was sentenced to 15 days' imprisonment and deportation. The Muslim Council of Britain, an umbrella organization of British Muslim groups, including MPACUK said the punishment was "completely unjustified" and that it was "appalled", and called on the Sudanese government to intervene.

On 30 November, approximately 10,000 protesters took to the streets in Khartoum, some of them waving swords and machetes, demanding Gibbons's execution after imams denounced her during Friday prayers. During the march, chants of "Shame, shame on the UK", "No tolerance – execution" and "Kill her, kill her by firing squad" were heard. Witnesses reported that government employees were involved in inciting the protests. Gibbons was then moved to a secret location because of fears for her safety.

== Release ==
In an attempt to push for the release of Gibbons, two British Muslim peers, Lord Ahmed and Baroness Warsi, visited Sudan with hopes of talking to the country's President Omar al-Bashir.

While the two British politicians were meeting the President on 3 December, it was announced that Gibbons was to be released from prison having been granted a presidential pardon. After eight days in prison, she was released into the care of the British embassy in Khartoum and then returned to Liverpool after issuing a written statement saying: "I have a great respect for the Islamic religion and would not knowingly offend anyone."

== Aftermath ==
The school was closed until January 2008 for the safety of pupils and staff, as reprisals were feared.

== See also ==
- Freedom of religion in Sudan
- Innocence of Muslims
- Mariam Yahia Ibrahim Ishag, sentenced to death for apostasy in Sudan
