= Islam in South Sudan =

South Sudan is a Christian majority country, with Islam being a minority faith practiced by around 6.2% of the total population as of 2010. Most Muslims in South Sudan welcomed secession in the South Sudanese independence referendum.

The last census to mention the religion of southerners dates back to 1956 where a majority were classified as following traditional beliefs or were Christian, while 18% were Muslim. A Pew Research Center report on Religion and Public Life estimated that in 2010, there were 610,000 Muslims in South Sudan, comprising 6.2% of the country's population.

== History ==
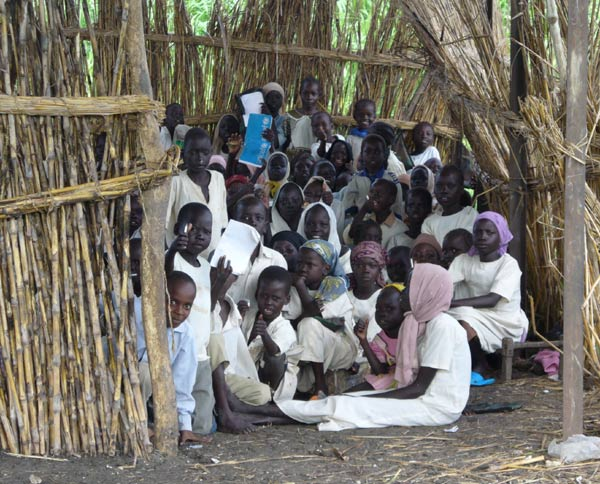
Muslim children in South Sudan

Muslim communities have been living in what is now South Sudan since at least the 19th century, and possibly earlier. Many of these Muslims descend from decommissioned conscripts in the Turco-Egyptian army who converted during the time of Turco-Egyptian military and commercial activity in southern Sudan.

== See also ==
- Religion in South Sudan
