= Islam in Sudan =

Most common religion in Sudan

Islam is the most common religion in Sudan and Muslims have dominated national government institutions since independence in 1956. According to UNDP Sudan, the Muslim population is 97%, including numerous Arab and non-Arab groups. The remaining 3% ascribe to either Christianity or traditional animist religions. Muslims predominate in all but Nuba Mountains region. The vast majority of Muslims in Sudan adhere to Sunni Islam of Maliki school of jurisprudence, deeply influenced with Sufism. There are also some Shia communities in Khartoum, the capital. The most significant divisions occur along the lines of the Sufi brotherhoods. Two popular brotherhoods, the Ansar and the Khatmia, are associated with the opposition Umma and Democratic Unionist Parties respectively. Only the Darfur region is traditionally lacking the presence of Sufi brotherhoods found in the rest of the country.

Shari'a law has been installed by various military regimes, and its application to non-Muslims in the capital was a contentious issue during the negotiations, but it and the other major issues underlying the north–south conflict have been largely resolved in the agreements. Shari'a is to continue to be the basis of the national legal system as it applies in the north; national legislation applicable to the south is to be based on "popular consensus, the values, and the customs of the people." In states or regions where a majority hold different religious or customary beliefs than those on which the legal system is based, the national laws may be amended to accord better with such beliefs. Throughout the country, the application of Shari'a to non-Muslims is to be limited, and courts may not exercise their discretion to impose the harsher physical forms of Shari'a penalties on non-Muslims. Sudan has had three democratic governments since 1956, all of which abolished Shari'a law.

In September 2020, Sudan constitutionally became a secular state after Sudan's transitional government agreed to separate religion from the state, ending 30 years of Islamic rule and Islam as the official state religion in the North African nation. This new legislation also ended the former apostasy law and public flogging.

== History ==
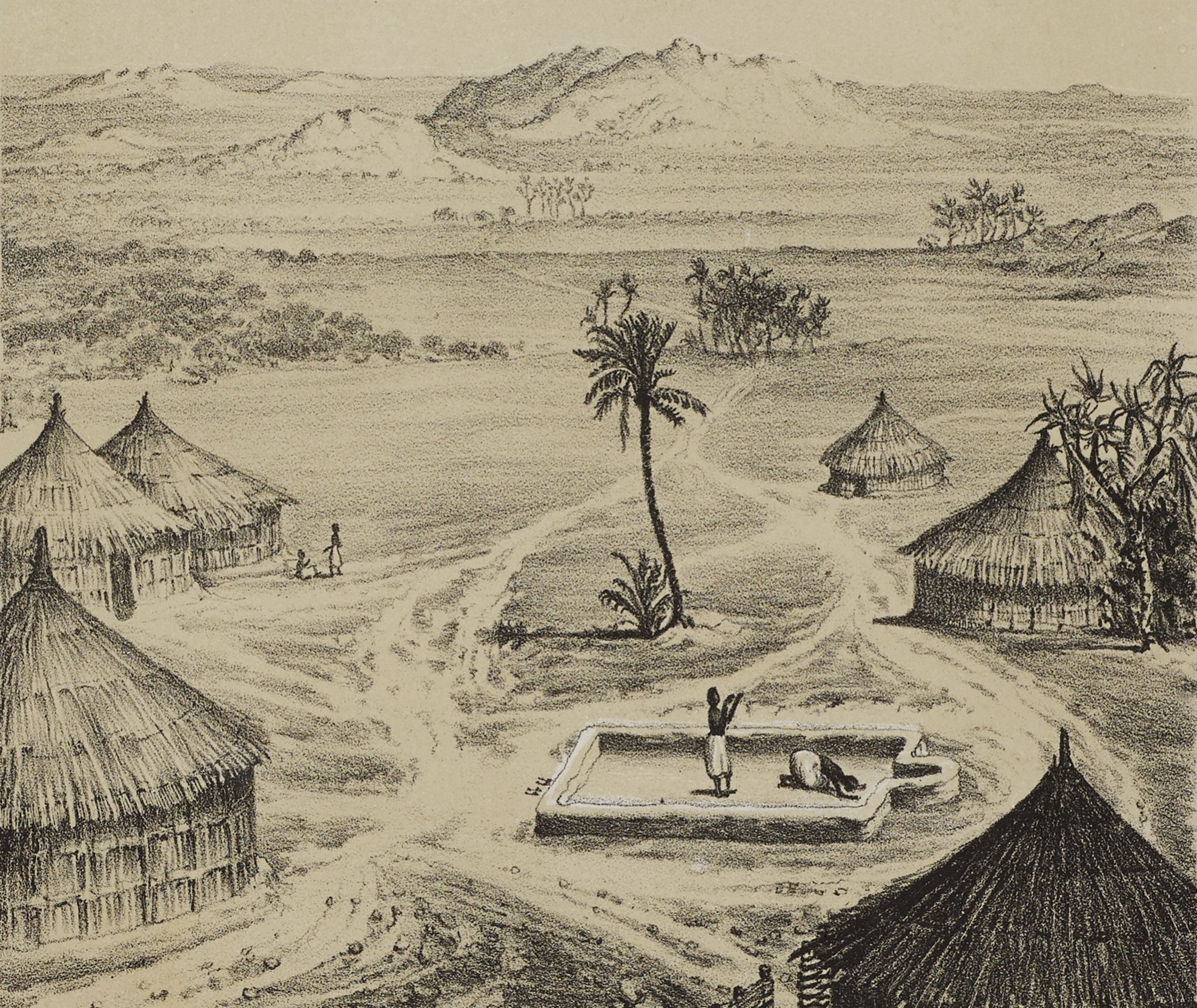
Simple village mosque in Upper Nubia, mid-19th century

There had been cultural contact between Nubians and Arabs long before the rise of Islam. Islam spread to Sudan from the north, after the Islamic conquest of Egypt under the government of Amr ibn al-As. Nubia had already been Christianized, also from Egypt, hence the old Nubian church followed Coptic Christianity. The Nubian Christian kingdoms of Nobatia, Makuria and Alodia fell to the Islamic invasions in 650, 1312 and 1504, respectively. From 1504, northern Sudan was ruled by the Muslim Funj Sultanate.

Southern Sudan, i.e. South Kordofan and what is now South Sudan was neither Christianized nor Islamized until the 19th century. This region fell under Islamic rule under Muhammad Ali, and there has been religious and ethnic conflict ever since; the Mahdiyah uprisings (1881–1899) can even be seen as the origin of political Islamism and resulted in British control during 1899–1955. Racial and religious conflicts between the Arab Muslim north and the Black African Christian South re-erupted in the First Sudanese Civil War (1955–1972), the Second Sudanese Civil War (1983–2005), the War in Darfur (2003–2010) and the Sudanese conflict in South Kordofan and Blue Nile (2011-2020).

See also

- Islam by country
- Christianity in Sudan
