= Greek Orthodox Church of the Annunciation, Khartoum =

Church in Sudan

Greek Orthodox Church of the Annunciation
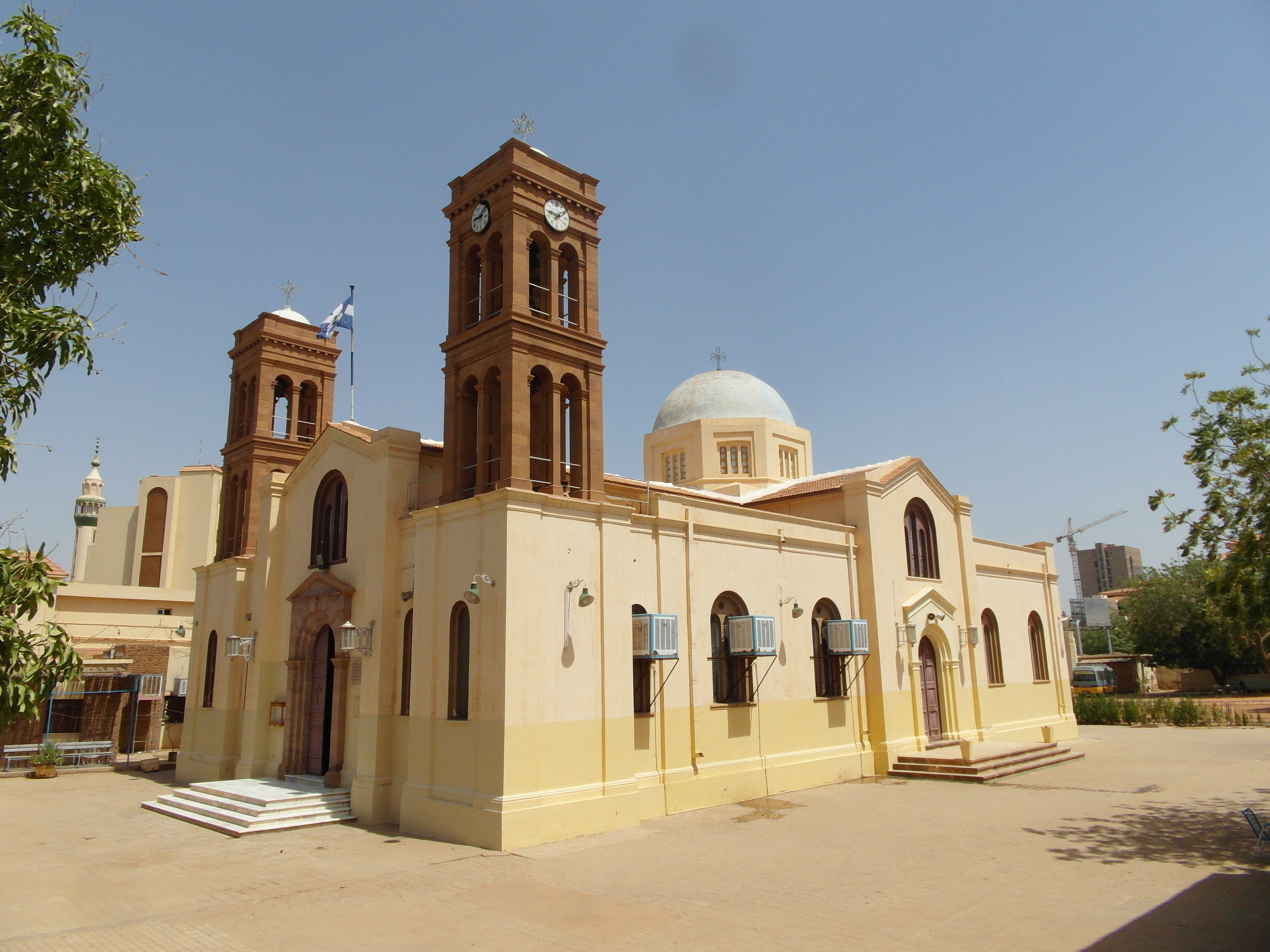
- The church in 2015

Religion
- Affiliation: Greek Orthodox Church
- Ecclesiastical or organizational status: active

Location
- Location: Khartoum, Sudan
- Interactive map of Greek Orthodox Church of the Annunciation
- Coordinates: 15.60684°N 32.53319°E

Architecture
- Type: Church
- Style: Greek Orthodox

The Greek Orthodox Church of the Annunciation is a historic religious building in Khartoum, Sudan. The church is part of the Greek Orthodox Patriarchate of Alexandria. The church is one of the last surviving in the city.

== History ==
The church was founded by Sudanese Greeks. The church stands in an area of the city with an adjoining school and community buildings, near where the Greek embassy once stood.

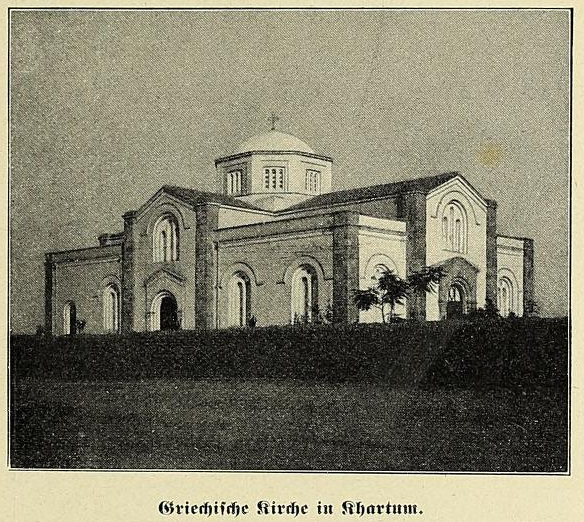
The church in 1914

During the Battle of Khartoum in April 2023, the church was used as shelter for civilians and Greek citizens.

== Gallery ==
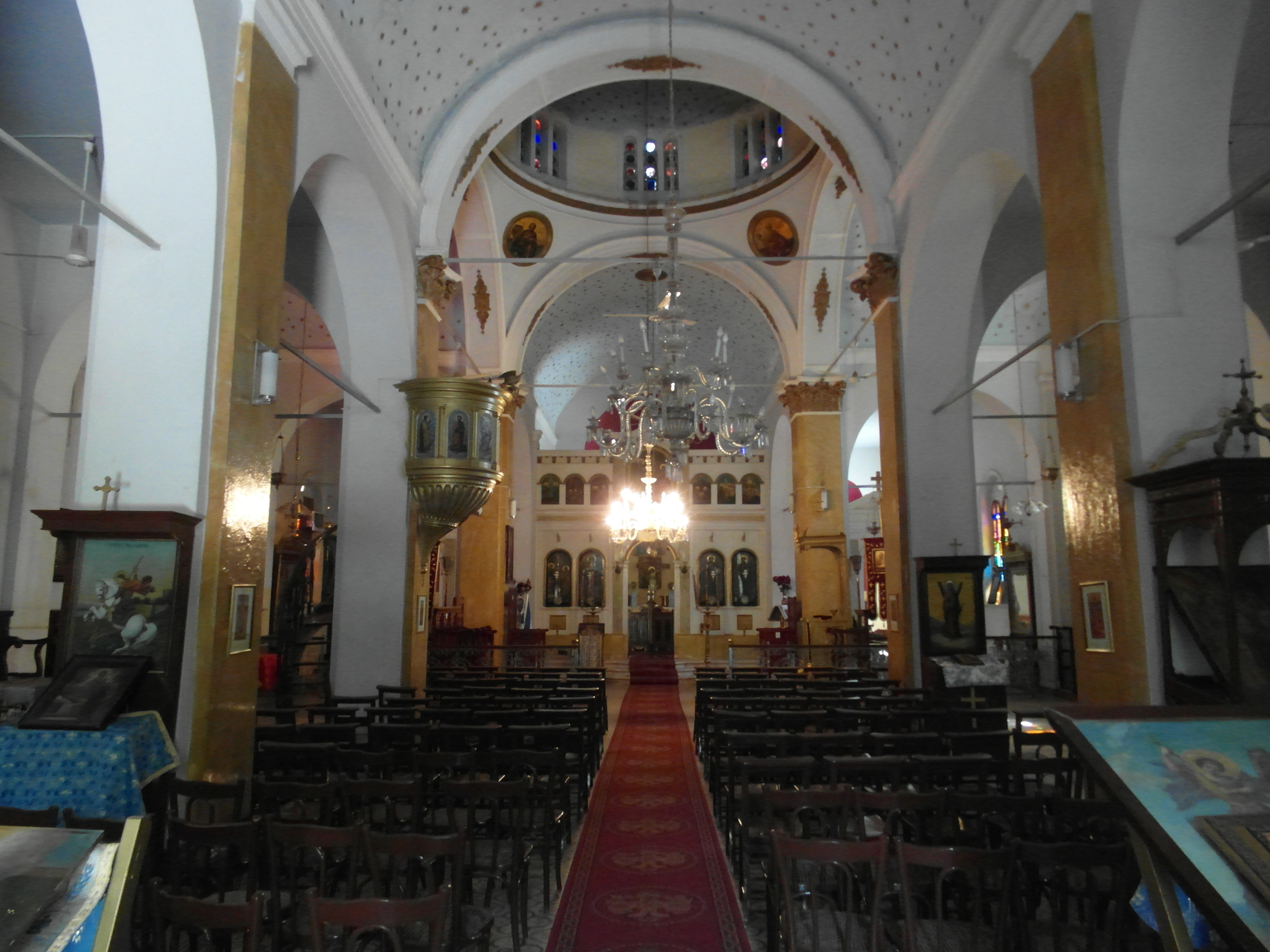
Church interior

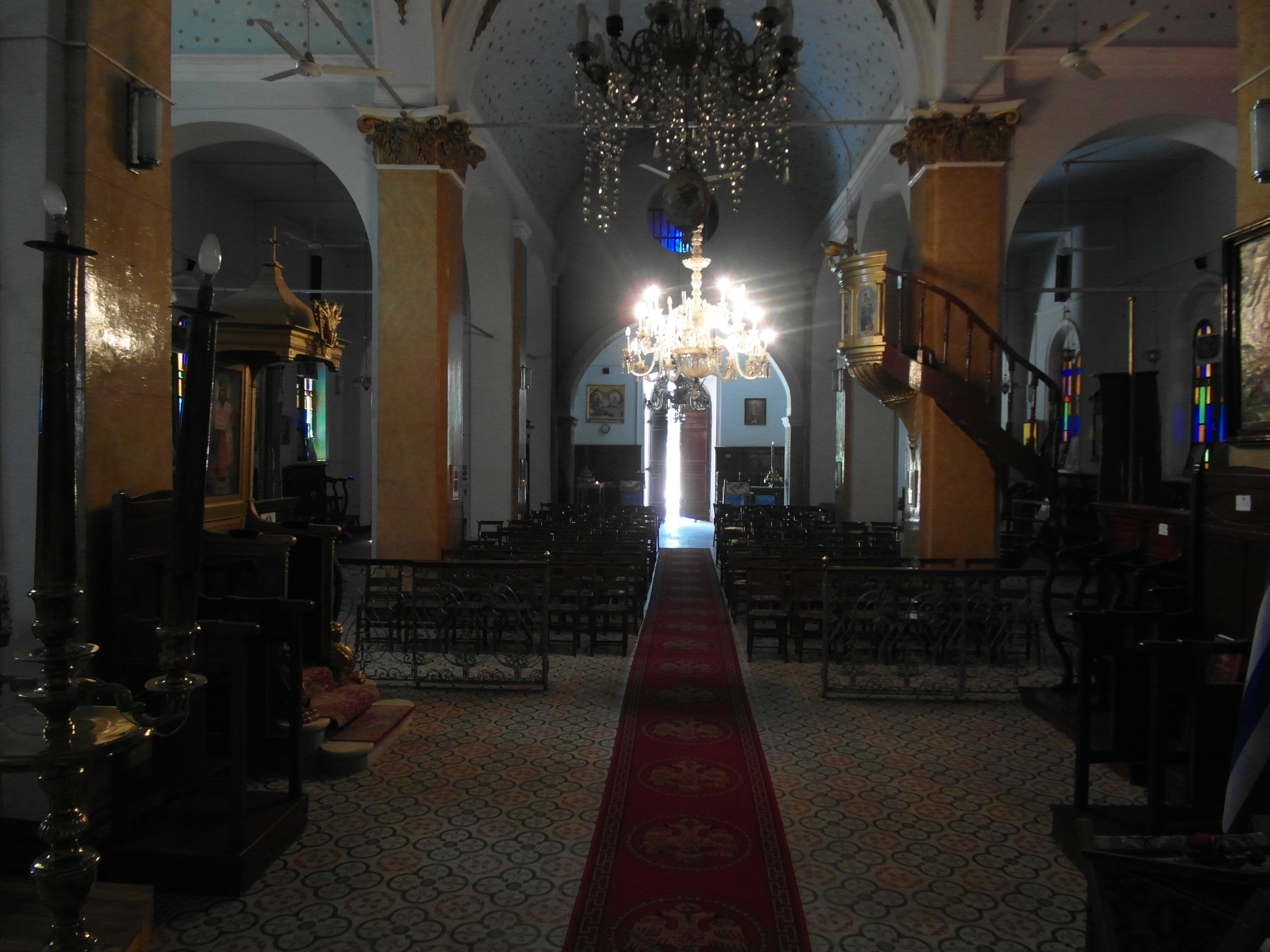
Church interior

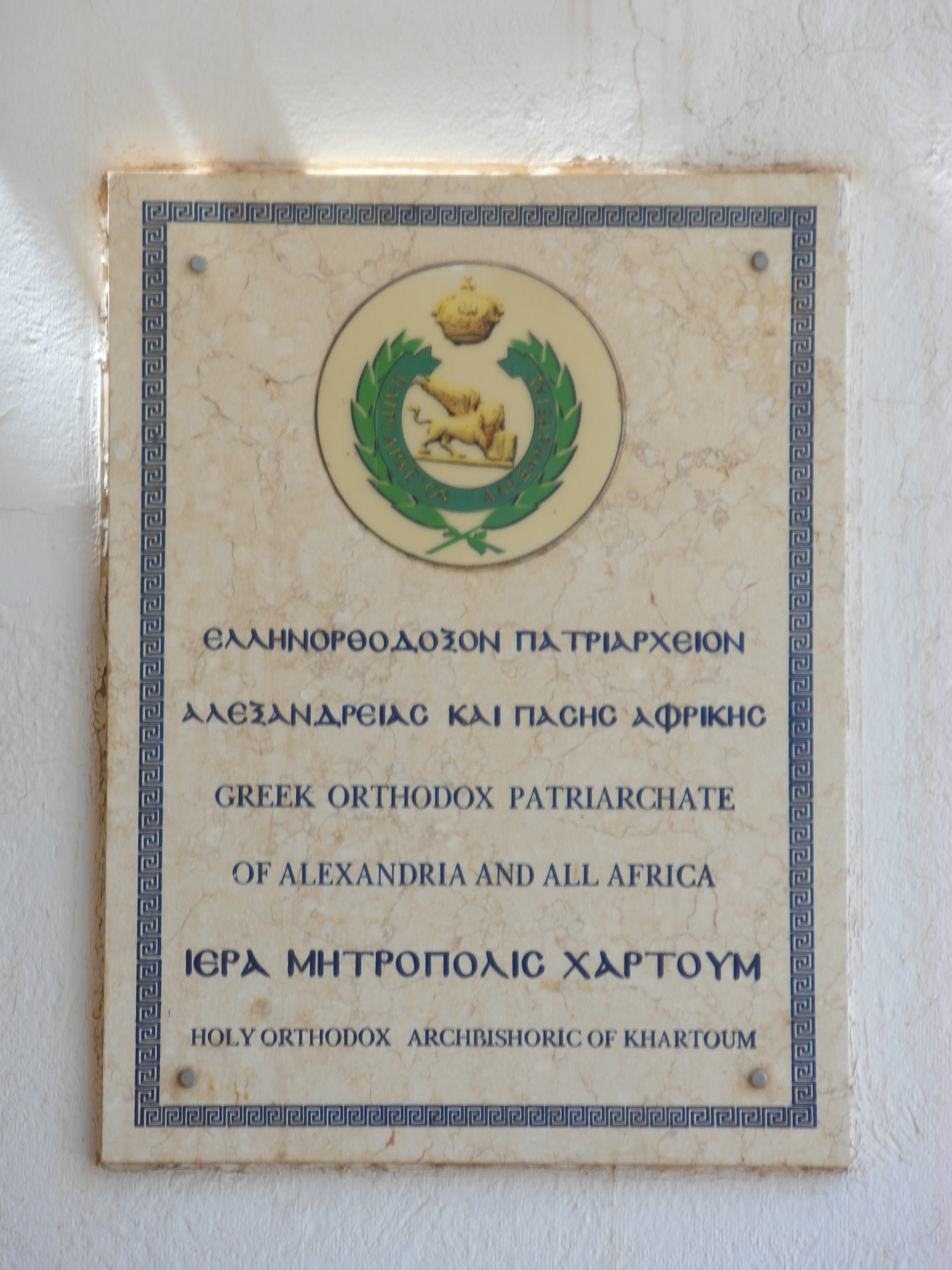
Church sign

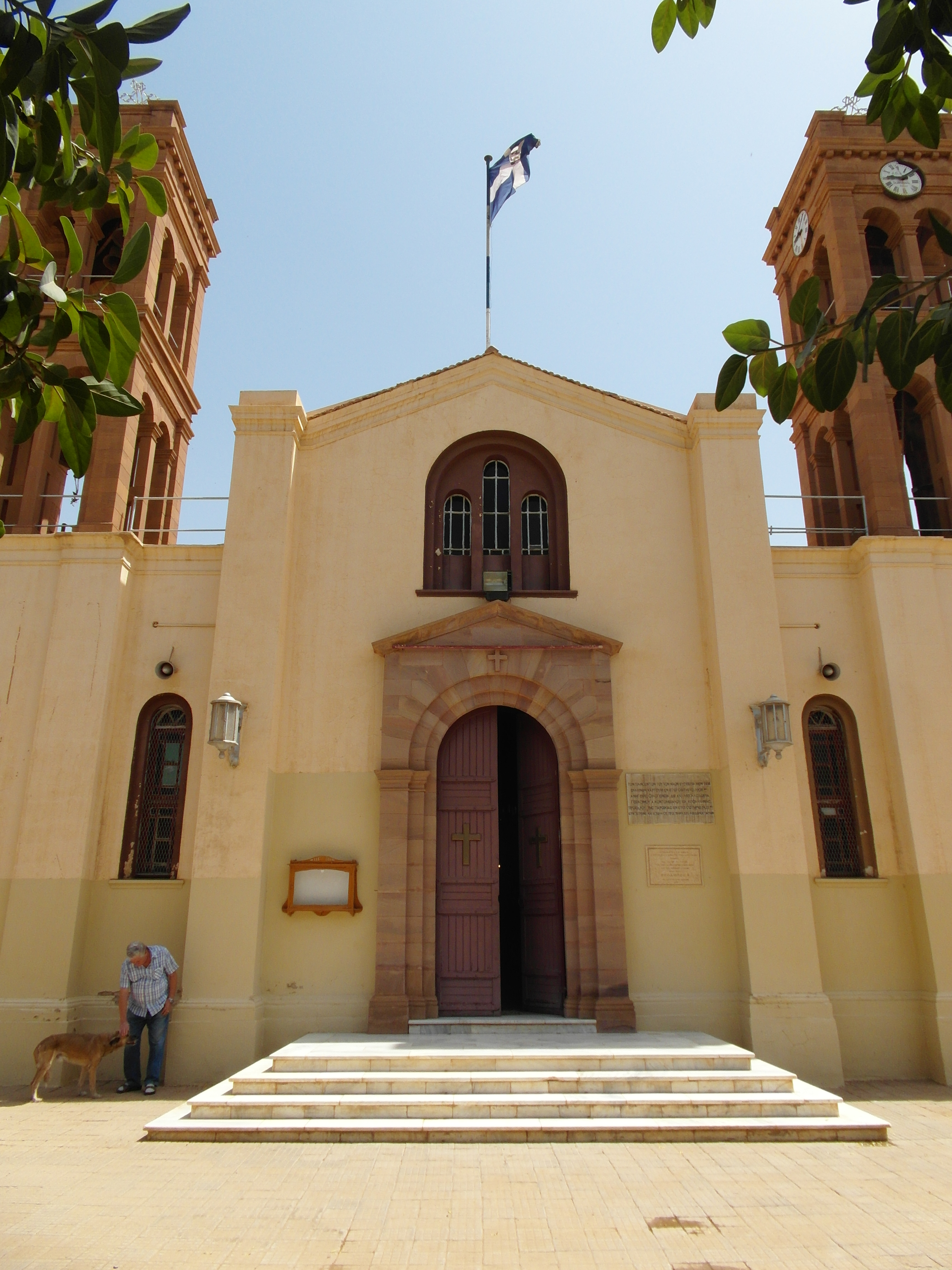
Church entrance

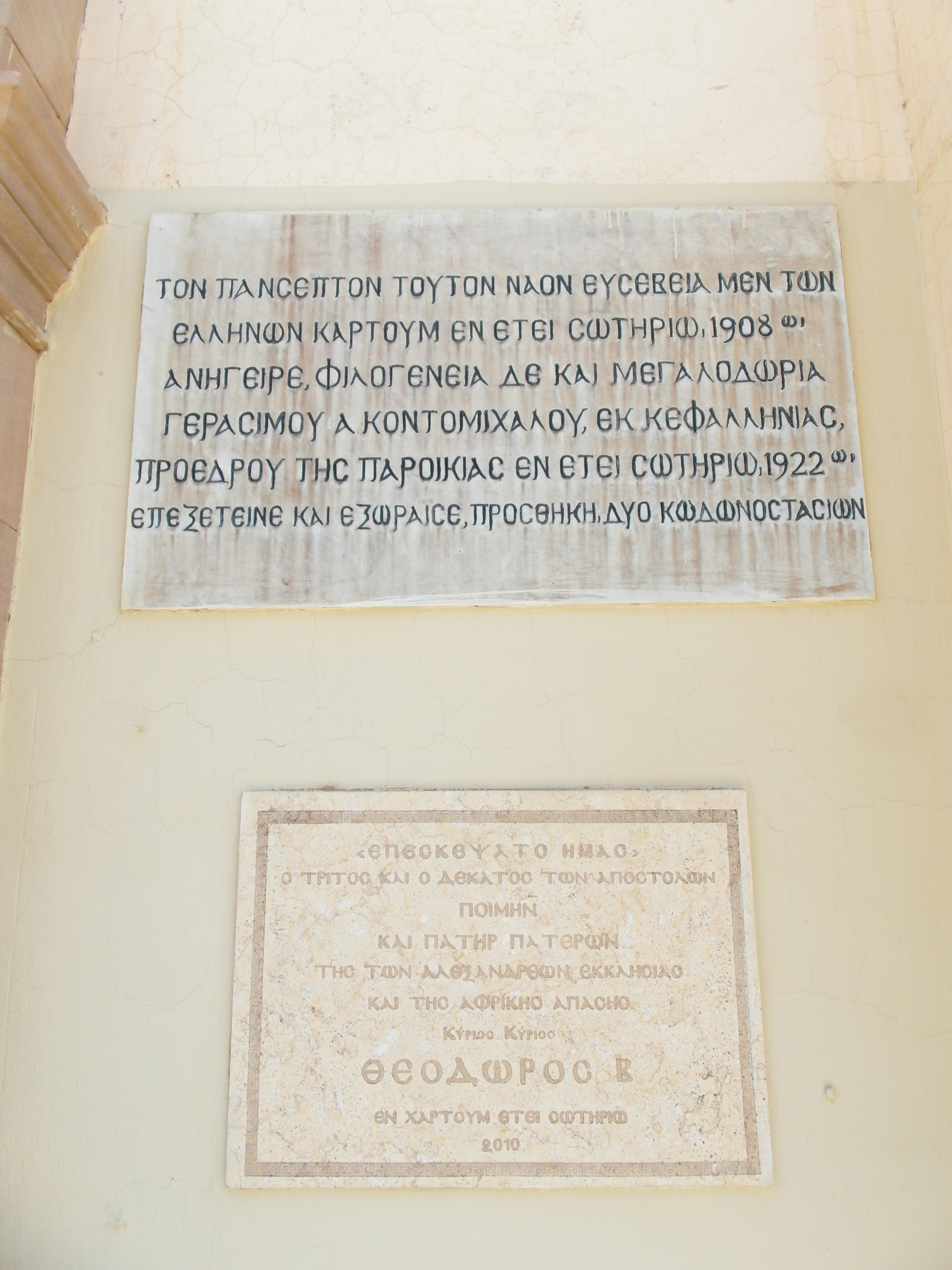
Memorial plaque

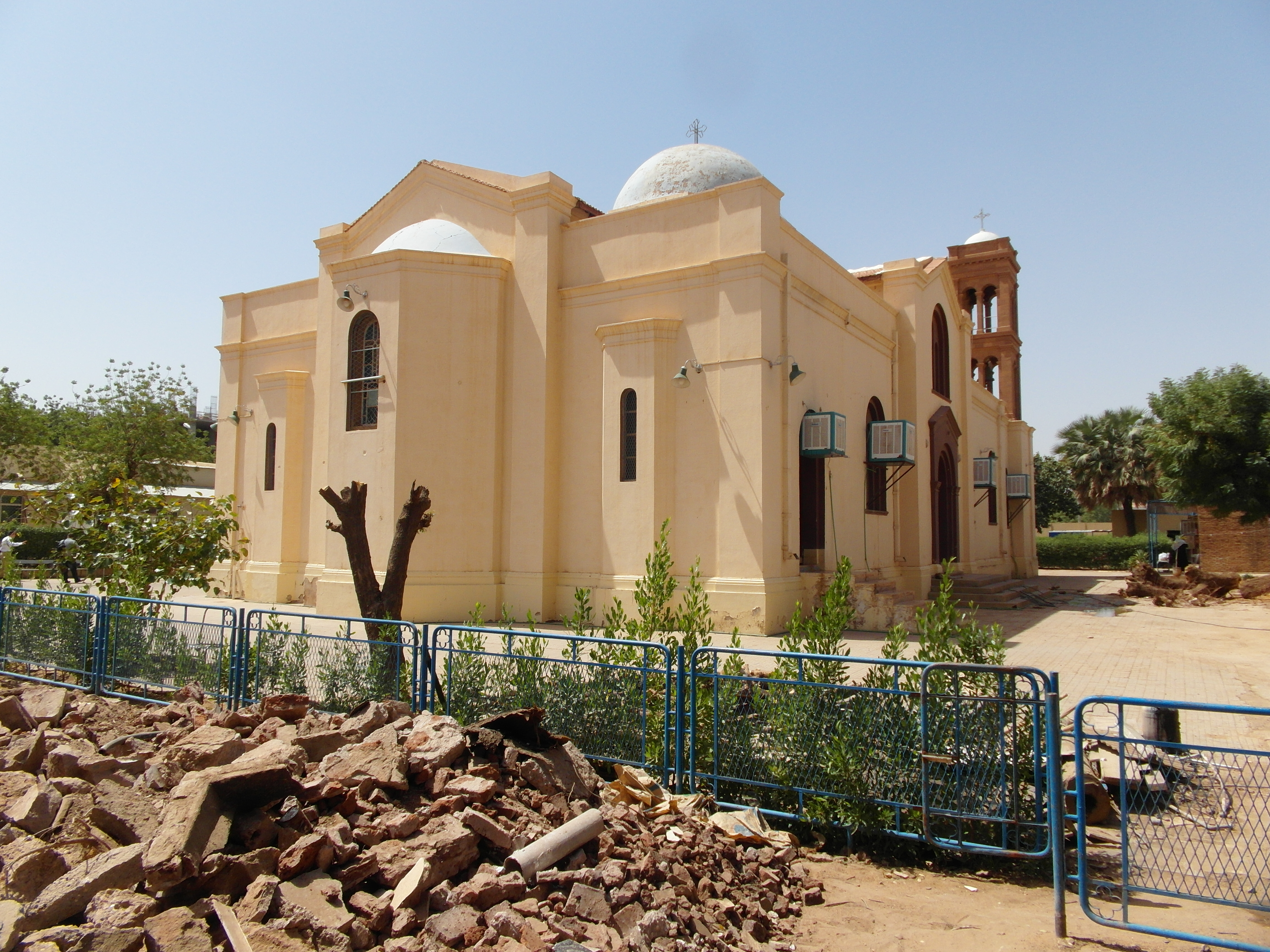
Church exterior

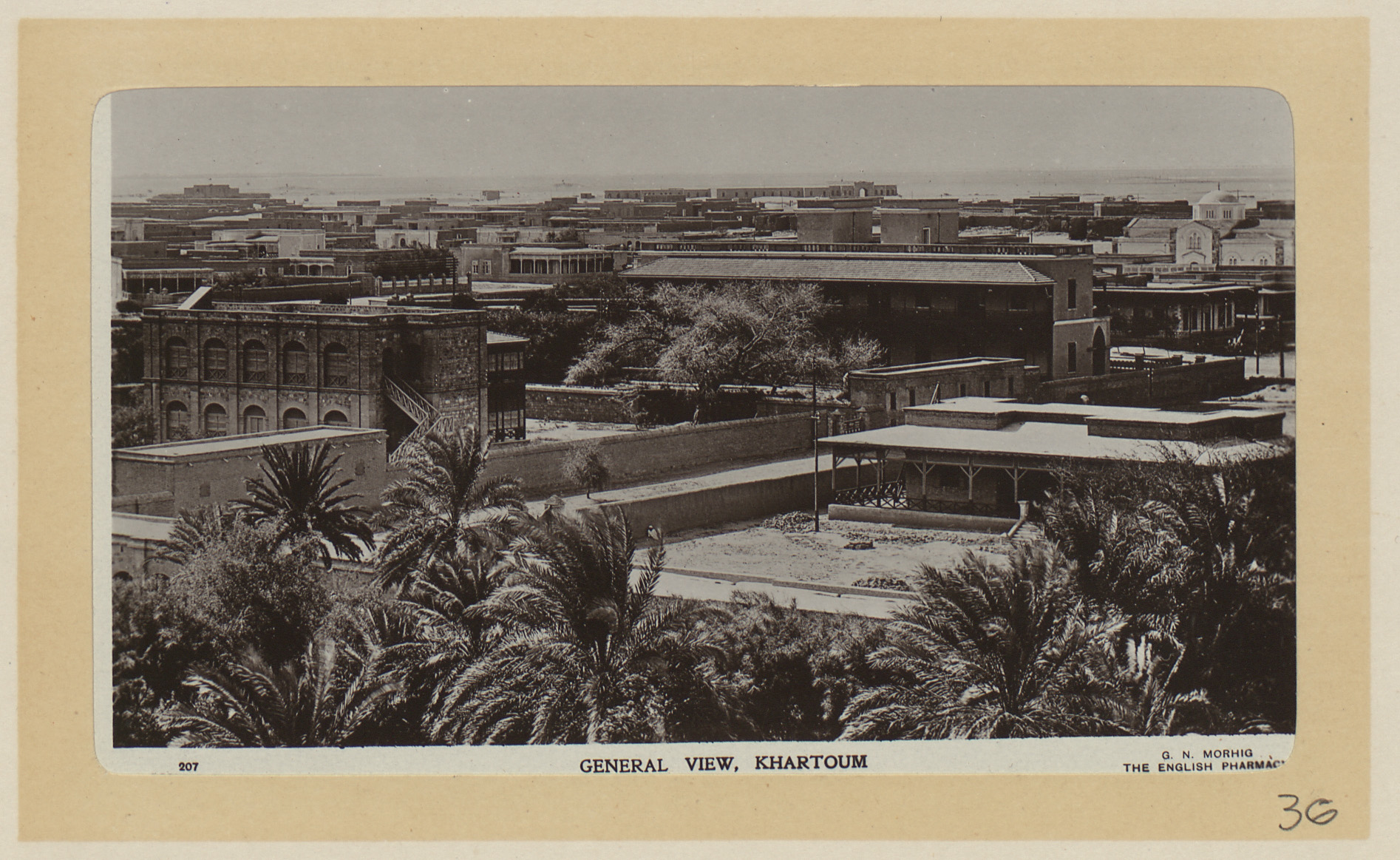
View of Khartoum with the Greek Orthodox Church of the Annunciation in the background on the far right, c. 1907

== See also ==
- Christianity in Sudan
