= Mariam Yahia Ibrahim Ishag =

Sudanese woman, sentenced to death for apostasy (born 1987)

Mariam Yahia Ibrahim Ishag (مريم يحيى إبراهيم إسحق; born 3 November 1987) is a Sudanese Christian activist and public speaker. Because Ibrahim's birth father is a Muslim, according to Islamic law she, an Ethiopian Orthodox Christian, is a Muslim, leading to her arrest for marrying a Christian man. She was arrested during her second pregnancy for apostasy and sentenced to death shortly thereafter, giving birth to a girl in prison on 27 May 2014. Ibrahim's case is part of a wider problem of persecution of Christians in Sudan.

Ibrahim was reportedly turned in to the authorities by one of her relatives. Her husband, Daniel Wani, appealed the sentence on both of their behalf. On 24 June 2014, Ibrahim was released on the order of a Sudanese appeal court. The following day, she and her family were arrested and taken to Khartoum for questioning following a tip-off to the police by her half-brother. The US Ambassador was summoned in protest at the granting of an exit visa, described by the Sudanese Foreign Ministry as "a criminal violation". Ibrahim was freed again on 26 June and took refuge in the United States embassy with her family. After extensive negotiations to enable her to leave Sudan, Ibrahim arrived in Rome on 24 July 2014, on an Italian government plane.

== Background ==
According to Islamic fiqh, marriage between a Muslim woman and non-Muslim man is invalid. Because her biological father was a Muslim, Ibrahim is considered a Muslim, so that even though she was raised as an Ethiopian Orthodox Christian and embraces that faith, her marriage to a Christian man was considered void by the court. She was therefore also sentenced to receive 100 lashes for adultery, in spite of the sexual relations having been only with her husband, with the flogging to be administered some time in advance of being hanged.

Moreover, her 20-month-old son was also imprisoned, and was initially denied all contact with his father, who would never have been permitted to raise him. Three of the boy's four grandparents – both his paternal grandparents, and his maternal grandmother – were Christian from birth, as were his parents – but the authorities have stated that as the absentee maternal grandfather that he never met was a Muslim, he therefore could not legally be raised by his Christian father.

In response, Meriam Ibrahim said that she has always been a Christian and never committed apostasy. Her half-brother, Al Samani Al Hadi Mohamed Abdullah, admitted he had instigated the charges against her and maintained she should be executed. Meriam Ibrahim's husband and her lawyers have alleged that her half-brother and half-sister had turned her in because they wanted to take over Meriam Ibrahim's successful businesses, which included a hair salon, agricultural land and a general convenience store in a shopping mall.

== Prison and family conditions ==
Meriam Yahia Ibrahim Ishag was held in Omdurman Federal Women's Prison with Martin Wani, her 20-month-old son. Visitors were initially not allowed; when her husband finally saw Meriam Ibrahim, she was shackled and had swollen legs. Muslim scholars visited her daily reciting the Koran and trying to pressure her to convert.

Speaking at a conference organised by Aid to the Church in Need, in Rome, October 2025, Mariam Ibrahim described her ordeal, saying "I spent Christmas 2013 in prison. I discovered I was pregnant just before being jailed. That first night in the cell I was terrified and could only pray. My mother had passed away, my father's family rejected me, and the media called me ‘unclean’, ‘infidel’ and ‘deserving of death’." She described how she managed to pray and read the Bible while in prison: "I had to cut its pages and hide them in my hair so I could read them in the bathroom. That was the only place I could open it without being discovered. I still carry that prison Bible with me everywhere I go."

Vital medical treatment was refused, and Meriam Ibrahim was denied transfer to a hospital even though she was 8 months into a difficult pregnancy. Even during childbirth, her legs were kept shackled to the floor and there were fears the baby girl might be permanently disabled due to this. The shackles were removed after the birth.

Mohamed Jar Elnabi, a lawyer representing Meriam Ibrahim, said police and the judge prevented her husband, Wani, going into the court. Elnabi said Wani requires the use of a wheelchair due to muscular dystrophy and "totally depends on her for all details of his life, he cannot live without her". Speaking about the couple's son Martin Wani, Elnabi said, "The couple's son is having a difficult time in prison. He is very affected from being trapped inside a prison from such a young age, he is always getting sick due to lack of hygiene and bugs." Reports that Meriam Ibrahim may be freed were subsequently officially denied. However, on 24 June 2014, Meriam Ibrahim was released on the order of a Sudanese appeal court. The following day, as she and her family were to board a plane to the United States, she and her family were arrested and taken from the airport to Khartoum for questioning. Authorities stated that she was not under arrest, but that the police wished to question her about the validity of a travel document provided to her by South Sudan. Daniel Wani claims in a report from Christian Today the family and supporters were violently handled, the lawyers were beaten and thrown out of the airport. Following their release, the family spent a month in the U.S. embassy in Khartoum.

== Defense lawyers ==
Meriam was represented by five lawyers: Mohaned Mustafa Elnour, Osman Mobarak Musa, Thabit Elzobair Suliman, Elshareef Ali Mohammed, Mohamed Abdunabi. The case has also been taken to the African Commission on people's Human Rights.

== Reactions ==
The fact that a woman has been sentenced to death for her religious choice, and to flogging for being married to a man of an allegedly different religion is appalling and abhorrent. Adultery and apostasy are acts which should not be considered crimes at all. It is [a] flagrant breach of international human rights law.

— Amnesty International

The way she is being treated is barbaric and has no place in today's world.

— David Cameron

If there is no European reaction we cannot feel worthy to call ourselves "Europe".

— Matteo Renzi, 1 July 2014

The United Kingdom government described the sentence as "barbaric" and a UK minister was "truly appalled", noting that Sudan breached international human rights obligations. The United States government was "deeply disturbed" and also called on Sudan to meet its obligations under international human rights law. A joint statement from embassies of Britain, Canada, the Netherlands, and the United States before sentencing also expressed "deep concern", urging "justice and compassion". Daniel Wani, Mariam's husband, has expressed disappointment at a lack of U.S. resoluteness, at the consulate level: "Considering I am an American citizen, I am disappointed with the American Embassy's position from the beginning of the whole case." The lengthy public silence of both President Obama and Secretary of State Kerry on their case drew widespread criticism. Kerry broke this silence on 12 June, after bipartisan lobbying.

Christian groups have been campaigning for Meriam Ibrahim but Islamic extremists also lobbied according to prominent newspaper editor Khalid Tigani.

A lawyer for Meriam Ibrahim said the case would, if necessary, have gone to Sudan's highest Constitutional Court. Sudan's 2005 interim constitution officially guarantees freedom of religion.

The Information Minister of Sudan, Ahmed Bilal Osman, appeared to comment on the court case prior to the appeal, when he said: "It's not only Sudan. In Saudi Arabia, in all the Muslim countries, it is not allowed at all for a Muslim to change his religion."

Christian Solidarity Worldwide, a British-based group working for religious freedom, said Ms. Ishag's case is the latest amongst "a series of repressive acts" against religious minorities in Sudan.

World Council of Churches general secretary, Dr Olav Fykse Tveit considers the sentence unjust and reminds president Omar al-Bashir, the Sudanese constitution guarantees all citizens the "right to the freedom of religious creed and worship".

British Conservative MP Liam Fox said: "Religious tolerance is something that the UK should be promoting at every opportunity. We need to ask ourselves whether it is acceptable to be giving taxpayers' money in aid to states which allow treatment such as that handed out to Meriam Ibrahim."

In May 2014, the embassies of the United States, Canada, the United Kingdom and the Netherlands issued a joint statement expressing "deep concern" about the case, urging Sudan to respect the right to freedom of religion. The European Union called for revocation of the "inhuman verdict" and John Kerry urged Sudan to repeal laws banning Muslims from joining other faiths.

Prince Hassan bin Talal of Jordan wrote, "There is no value in worship performed in the absence of free choice and volition."

Amnesty International's Deputy Regional Director Sarah Jackson said: "Today's ruling is a small step to redressing the injustice done to Meriam."

The Italian Prime Minister, Matteo Renzi, mentioned Ibrahim's case in his speech at the European Parliament. After that, The EU passed a Resolution condemning Sudan over treatment of Meriam Ibrahim.

Some critics of the Sudanese government argued that this case served as a distraction from complaints by Sudanese citizens. Mohamed Ghilan claims, "The punishment has little to do with religion and serves as a political distraction. This is a ploy by the Sudanese regime to appear as 'defenders of Islam' to mitigate their corruption". Sudan has been noted by the Corruption Perceptions Index as being one of the world's most corrupt.

== Departure from Sudan ==
After Meriam and her family took refuge in the US Embassy, the Italian government offered help to speed up the process of getting U.S. passports, given its good relation with Sudan, and vice-minister for foreign affairs Lapo Pistelli flew to the Sudanese capital to that end. Two weeks later vice-minister Pistelli accompanied the family back to Italy on a government plane which took off from Khartoum, and they were welcomed in Rome by Prime Minister Matteo Renzi and Foreign Minister Federica Mogherini.

Pope Francis had expressed "his gratitude and joy" to the Italian Government when he was informed by Renzi of the family's arrival. Later in that day, Meriam and her family met the Pontiff at his residence of Casa Santa Marta in Vatican City for about half an hour, during which she thanked the Catholic Church for their support and prayers, while the Pope thanked her and her family for their "courageous and constant witness of faith".

== Post-immigration ==
The family lived in New Hampshire in the United States for 25 months and moved to Virginia, where they live now. Meriam Ibrahim is advocating for other victims of religious persecution and women who face gender-based violence and domestic abuse. She is the co-founder and director of Global Mobilization at Tahrir Alnisa foundation.

It [my time in prison] wasn't easy, I can't describe it, but there are others who are in worse conditions in Sudan than those I was in. ... Sadly, this was all under the guise of the law. So instead of protecting people, the law is harming them.

— Meriam Ibrahim

I put my life at risk for the women of Sudan and for Christians live under difficult circumstances, persecuted and treated harshly. There are many Meriams in Sudan and throughout the world.

== See also ==
- Freedom of religion in Sudan
- Freedom of conscience
- Sudanese teddy bear blasphemy case
