= Freedom of religion in Sudan =

The 2019 transitional constitution of Sudan guarantees freedom of religion and omits reference to sharia as a source of law, unlike the 2005 constitution of Sudan's deposed president Omar al-Bashir whose government had criminalized apostasy and blasphemy against Islam. Bashir's government had also targeted Shia Muslims and those engaging in proselytization to faiths other than Islam. Christians had also faced restrictions in matters of religious freedom.

Apostasy from Islam was decriminalized in July 2020, whereas previously those found guilty of apostasy could face the death penalty. In September 2020, the interim government established the separation of religion and state.

== Religious demographics ==
The country has an area of 967,500 square miles (2,510,000 km^{2}) and a population of 40.2 million. Demographic data are estimates. Two-thirds to three-fourths of the population live in the 15 states of the north, and are generally from Arabic speakers. The remaining one-fourth to one-third of the population live in the south, and are primarily Nilotic peoples. An estimated 70 percent of the population is Muslim. Islam predominates in the north. Almost all Muslims are Sunni, although there are significant distinctions between followers of different Sunni traditions (particularly among Sufi brotherhoods).

An estimated 25 percent of the population holds traditional indigenous beliefs (animism), which are prevalent in rural areas throughout the country. Some animists have been baptized but do not identify themselves as Christians, or they combine Christian and animist practices. Christians are the third largest religious group, traditionally concentrated in the south and the Nuba Mountains. Widespread displacement and migration during the long civil war increased the population of Christians living in the north. While many Christians have returned to the south, Khartoum still has a significant Christian population. The Roman Catholic Church of Sudan and the Episcopal Churches of Sudan estimate they have six million and five million baptized followers, respectively, although active churchgoers are far fewer. The Presbyterian Church in Sudan is the third largest denomination in Sudan.

There are small but long-established groups of Orthodox Christians (including Coptic Orthodox and Greek Orthodox) in Khartoum and other northern cities. There are also Ethiopian and Eritrean Orthodox communities in Khartoum and the east, largely made up of refugees and migrants. Other Christian groups with smaller followings include the Africa Inland Church, Armenian (Apostolic) Church, Sudan Church of Christ, Sudan Interior Church, Jehovah's Witnesses, Sudan Pentecostal Church, Sudan Evangelical Presbyterian Church (in the north), Presbyterian Church of the Sudan (in the south), and the Seventh-day Adventist Church of Sudan.

Religion plays a prominent role in a complex system of political alliances. Northern Muslims have dominated the political and economic system since independence in 1956. Since the signing of the Comprehensive Peace Agreement (CPA) in 2005, the GNU has appointed both Muslims and Christians to prominent executive positions. The dominant political power in Sudan, the National Congress Party (NCP), draws its support from conservative Arab Muslims in the north. Its previous incarnation, the National Islamic Front, ruled from 1989 to 1998. Northern opposition parties draw their support from Sufi brotherhoods: the Umma Party is closely connected with Arab followers of the Ansar sect, and the Democratic Unionist Party with the Khatmia sect. Opposition parties typically include non-Arab Muslims from the north, east, and Darfur. Following the civil war the Sudanese People's Liberation Movement (SPLM) became the dominant political power in the south, and is the main coalition partner with the ruling National Congress Party (NCP) in the GNU. The SPLM draws its support from Southern Christians, but regularly engages with Muslim opposition parties and rebel groups in Darfur and the east.

== Status ==
The INC provides for freedom of religion throughout the entire country, but disparities in the legal treatment of religious minorities exist between the north and south. The INC preserves Shari'a as a source of legislation in the north. The Constitution of Southern Sudan provides for freedom of religion, and other laws and policies of the GoSS contribute to the generally free practice of religion. The INC and the Constitution of Southern Sudan both deny recognition to any political party which discriminates on the basis of religion. There are no legal remedies to address constitutional violations of religious freedom by government or private individuals.

Although there is no penalty for converting from another religion to Islam, converting from Islam to another religion was punishable by imprisonment or death in the north until 2020; however, a death sentence for apostasy had never been carried out. The government supports Islam by providing funds for mosque construction throughout the north; it also exerts influence over the established Muslim hierarchy by retaining the right to appoint and dismiss imams in most northern mosques. Blasphemy and defaming religion are punishable by imprisonment in the north, although these restrictions are rarely enforced. Authorities in the north occasionally subject converts to scrutiny, ostracism and intimidation, or encourage them to leave the country. In the south, there are no penalties for apostasy, blasphemy, or defaming religion; proselytizing is common.

The government had codified limited aspects of Shari'a law into criminal and civil law, with penalties dependent on the religion of the accused. For instance, the consumption of alcohol is punishable by 40 lashes for a Muslim and 20 for a Christian; however, there were no reports of this punishment being implemented during the reporting period. The GNU observes both Muslim and Christian holidays, including Eid al-Adha, the Islamic New Year, the Birthday of Muhammad, Coptic Easter, Israa Wal Mi'Raaj, Eid ul-Fitr and Christmas. In the south, GoSS offices do not observe Islamic holy days. Religious groups are required by law to register with the government as non-governmental organizations (NGOs), although this requirement is not enforced. Religious organizations must register as nongovernmental, nonprofit organizations to claim exemption from taxes and import duties. All religious groups must obtain permits from the national Ministry of Guidance and Social Endowments, the state Ministry of Construction and Planning, and the local planning office before constructing new houses of worship.

Shari'a apostasy penalties within the legal code limited Christian missionary activities in the north, and the government customarily delayed the issuance of visas to foreigners with affiliations to international faith-based organizations for long periods. The GoSS does not restrict the presence of foreign missionaries, and does not require them to register. Under the state-mandated curriculum, all schools in the north are required to teach Islamic-education classes from preschool through university. All classes must be taught in Arabic, although English may be taught as a foreign language. Public schools are not required to provide any religious instruction to non-Muslims, and some public schools excuse non-Muslims from Islamic-education classes. Private schools must hire a special teacher for teaching Islamic education, even in Christian schools. Christian leaders cite these requirements as exacerbating problems in the relationship between the Muslim majority and the Christian minority, marginalizing Christianity's place in northern society.

National government offices and businesses in the north follow the Islamic workweek, with Friday as a day of prayer. Employers are required by law to give their Christian employees two hours before 10:00 a.m. on Sunday for religious purposes; in practice many employers do not, and there was no legal remedy. Public schools are in session on Sunday; Christian students are not excused from classes. Most Christians adapt by worshiping on Friday, Saturday, or Sunday evenings. GoSS offices and businesses in the south follow the Monday-through-Friday workweek, with Sunday a day of religious observance. Employers in the south generally do not give their Muslim employees two hours on Friday for religious purposes, as required under law in the north. Schools in the south are in session on Friday, and Muslim students are not excused from class.

The Comprehensive Peace Agreement of 2005 (CPA) mandated the creation of a Commission for the Rights of Non-Muslims in the National Capital, a mechanism designed to advise the courts on how to fairly apply Shari'a to non-Muslims. The commission (with representatives from Muslim, Christian, and traditional religious groups) met several times during the reporting period. Although it made little headway in changing official government policy towards non-Muslims in Khartoum, the commission created a forum for dialogue on religious matters that was previously nonexistent; it obtained release or leniency for some non-Muslims arrested for violating Shari'a law.

== Restrictions ==
Although the government generally does not vigorously enforce its strictest restrictions on religious freedom, it tends not to respect religious plurality in the north. The GoSS generally respects religious freedom in practice, and pursued policies that contributed to the generally free practice of religion during the period covered by the report. The government favored Muslims over Christians in the north, in part by funding the construction of mosques but not churches. Many southern Christians living in the north are economic migrants and due to many factors, they suffer from social, educational, and job discrimination. Overwhelmingly Muslim in composition, the ruling NCP favors members of its political and tribal groups. Opposition political parties, often composed of adherents of Sufi sects and non-Arab northern Muslims, are excluded from the political process and national policymaking. Although the INC and the Constitution of Southern Sudan specifically prohibit discrimination on the basis of religion for candidates for the national civil service, the selection process favors party members and friends of the NCP.

Permits for new mosques in the north are generally issued, and three new churches were under construction in Khartoum. However, many Muslim and Christian religious leaders complain that the permit process is cumbersome and time-consuming. The GoSS did not appear to require permits for the construction and rehabilitation of mosques and churches. The government restricts foreigners from entering the country for Christian missionary work, but it allows foreign Christian religious leaders to enter in support of their local congregations. The Humanitarian Affairs Committee expelled foreign workers of international aid organizations, although several US-based Christian aid organizations maintained operations throughout the north.

The National Intelligence and Security Service monitors religious activities at mosques and churches throughout the country, often posing as members of the congregation. Christian leaders acknowledge that they usually refrain from preaching on political or other sensitive topics; some Muslim imams avoid political topics in their preaching as well. The GoSS does not appear to monitor religious activities at mosques or churches in the south. In a 25 July 2007 interview with the Saudi Arabian newspaper Okaz, the Minister of Defense, Abdel Rahim Mohammed Hussein, claimed that "24 Jewish organizations" were fueling the conflict in Darfur. Anti-Semitic rhetoric is common in both official media and statements by NCP officials.

== Abuses ==
There were a few reports that security forces regularly harassed and, at times, used threats and violence against individuals because of their religious beliefs and activities; however, such reports continued to decrease during the period covered by this report. In June 2001, Aladin Omer Agabani Mohammed, a Khartoum resident, was arrested for converting from Islam to Christianity and detained incommunicado for three months; he reportedly was tortured. In September 2001, he was released on medical grounds, but was required to report daily to the security forces. In January and February 2002, security police again harassed Aladin, put him under surveillance, and refused his requests to travel because he had converted to Christianity. On 30 January 2002, airport authorities refused to allow Aladin to board a plane to Uganda to study at St. Paul Theology Seminary, although he had received his visas and military exemption; the authorities reportedly told him that he was an apostate abandoning Islam.

== Current situation ==
The government's approach towards religious minorities allegedly continued to improve. It toned down public rhetoric aimed at religious minorities, permitted the publication and distribution of Christian newspapers in the north, and allowed a church to broadcast religious radio programming from Khartoum. Unlike prior reporting periods, the government did not engage in severe abuses of religious freedom. The National Assembly, the Council of States, and the Cabinet feature both Muslims and Christians in prominent roles. The government sought alliances with local Christian leaders, funding site improvements for Khartoum's Catholic cathedral.

In April 2008, a delegation of the World Council of Churches toured the country, met with government officials in the north and GoSS officials in the south, and hosted a large nondenominational Christian festival in Juba. Unlike prior reporting periods, some of Khartoum's English-language newspapers featured lengthy articles on Christian themes. In the south, Muslim religious leaders reported less interreligious tension during the reporting period.

Other sources disagree.

Christian Solidarity Worldwide, a British-based group working for religious freedom, said Ms Ishag's case is the latest among "a series of repressive acts" against religious minorities in Sudan. It said deportations, the confiscation and destruction of church property, and other actions against Christians have increased since December 2012.

— RTÉ News and Current Affairs

The Khartoum government has launched a brutal war in the Nuba Mountains and Blue Nile state, bombarding its own people and denying vital humanitarian assistance. Last fall, the US Commission on International Religious Freedom (USCIRF), on which we serve, visited a refugee camp in South Sudan filled with people who had fled the Nuba Mountains after being targeted based on their religious identity. Across Sudan, the government is cracking down on civil society, and arresting and frequently torturing protestors, opposition members, students, and activists. Religious freedom violations increased substantially last year [2010?] and continue to rise today. These abuses reflect a determination to enforce a narrow, rigid ideology against Sudan’s religious, cultural, and ethnic diversity, and particularly against Christians and non-conforming Muslims.

— World Affairs

In July 2020, during the 2019–2021 Sudanese transition to democracy, Justice Minister Nasredeen Abdulbari stated that "all the laws violating the human rights in Sudan" were to be scrapped. For this reason, Parliament had passed laws in early July 2020 abolishing the punishment for apostasy for Muslims (Article 126 of the Sudanese Penal Code), the prohibition on alcohol for non-Muslims, the need for women to obtain permission from a male relative to travel, and flogging as a form of punishment. The United States Commission on International Religious Freedom (USCIRF) applauded the reforms on 15 July 2020, but urged Sudanese lawmakers to repeal the blasphemy law (Article 125 of the Sudanese Penal Code) as well. On September 4, 2020, the interim government signed a declaration formally separating religion and state.

In 2025, Sudan was ranked as the 5th most dangerous country to be a Christian.

== Social attitudes ==
Muslims in the north who express an interest in Christianity or convert to Christianity faced severe social pressure to recant. Some universities continued to pressure women to wear headscarves to classes, although social pressure for women to wear headscarves in public in the north decreased overall. The government arrested, detained, and charged 16 people in connection with the September 2006 killing of Mohamed Taha, the Shi'a editor-in-chief of the al-Wafaq daily newspaper, who published a controversial article about the origins of Muhammad.

== Sources ==
- International Religious Freedom 2008
