= Religion in South Sudan =

Religion in South Sudan (2020 estimate)
1. Christianity (60.5%)
2. Traditional faiths (32.9%)
3. Islam (6.20%)
4. Other religions (0.40%)

Religious map of South Sudan in 2010

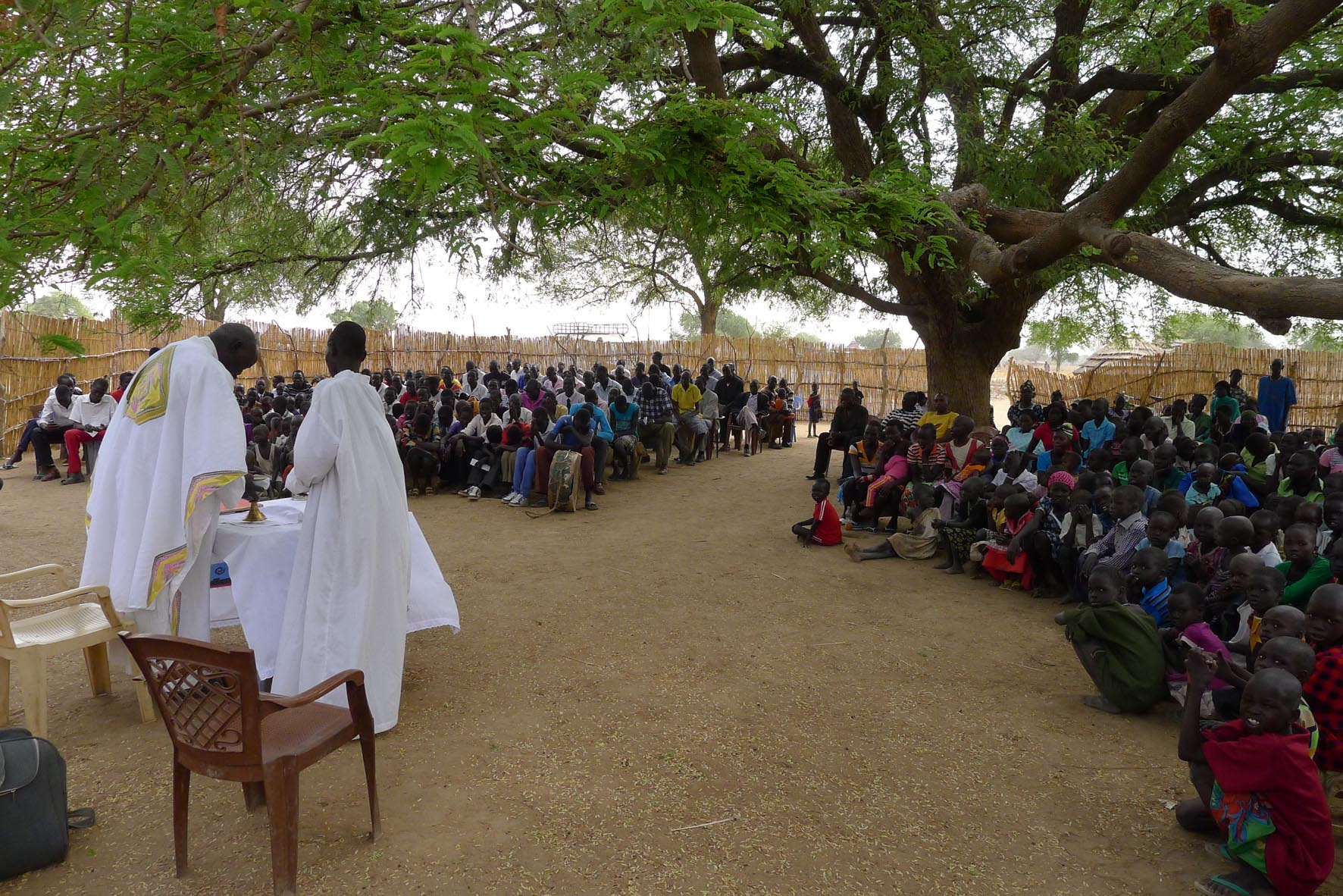
Catholic Mass celebrated under a tree in Warrap

Christianity is the most widely professed religion in South Sudan, with significant minorities of the adherents of traditional faiths and Islam.

President Salva Kiir, a Catholic, while speaking at St. Theresa Cathedral in Juba, stated that South Sudan would be a nation which respects freedom of religion. The reported estimated relative proportions of adherents of traditional African religions and Christianity have varied. A 2019 study found that Protestants outnumbered Catholics in South Sudan.

Christian worshippers at a church in Juba

== History ==
Christianity has a long history in the region that is now South Sudan. Ancient Nubia was reached by Coptic Christianity by the 1st century, and Christian missionary activity from neighbouring Ethiopia consolidated that community. In 1920, the Protestant Church Missionary Society originated a diocese.

== Religious membership ==
=== Background ===
In the early 1990s, official records of Sudan as a whole (Sudan and South Sudan) showed that a large percentage adhered to African traditional religions (17%) and Christianity (8%) (though both located mainly in the south, some also at Khartoum). Among Christians, most are Catholic and Anglican, though other denominations were also active, and traditional African religions' beliefs were often blended with Christian beliefs.

The Anglican and Catholic churches both claimed large membership; the Anglican Communion claimed 2 million members in 2005 in the Episcopal Church of the Sudan. The third largest denomination was the Presbyterian Church in Sudan.

=== Membership in the 2020s ===
The 2020 Pew-Templeton Global Religious Futures Project report estimated that Christians made up 60.5% of the population, while followers of indigenous (animist) religions made up 32.9% and Muslims, 6.2%. The remainder of the population was made up of followers of Baha’i, Buddhist, Hindu, and Jewish faiths; however, the country’s population displacement made it difficult to collect accurate details.

In 2022 the new Catholic bishop of Rumbek, Christian Carlassare, stated that "More than half the population of South Sudan is Christian, only 8% are Muslim. Other groups live on the margins, and have not drawn close to the Gospel. However, we live in a country where Christianity is often no more than skin deep, it hasn't grown roots in the life of the population."

=== International visits ===
Since its independence in 2011, South Sudan has been frequently visited by global religious leaders. Franklin Graham led the Hope for A New Nation Festival in Juba in 2012, gathering 95,000 attendees. On 12 November 2019, evangelist T. B. Joshua from Nigeria addressed the South Sudanese nation at the Presidential Palace in Juba in the presence of President Salva Kiir. From 2-4 February 2023, Justin Welby (Anglican Communion), Pope Francis (Catholic Church), and Iain Greenshields (Church of Scotland Moderator) visited South Sudan through a three-day "pilgrimage of peace to the world's newest nation".

== Freedom of religion ==
In 2026, Freedom House scored South Sudan 1 out of 4 for religious freedom.

The transitional constitution provides for separation of religion and state and freedom to worship and assemble; all religious groups must register with the government.

== See also ==
- Catholicism in South Sudan
- Province of the Episcopal Church of South Sudan and Sudan
- Islam in South Sudan

== Sources ==
- Grillmeier, Aloys; Hainthaler, Theresia (1996). Christ in Christian Tradition: The Church of Alexandria with Nubia and Ethiopia after 451. Vol. 2/4. Louisville: Westminster John Knox Press. ISBN 9780664223007.
