= Presbyterian Church in Sudan =

The Presbyterian Church in Sudan or also the Presbyterian Church in South Sudan is a major Reformed denomination in South Sudan, when it become independent from Sudan.

It has approximately 1,000,000 members and 500 congregations in Southern Sudan. The denomination was established by American missionaries, namely Rev. Kelly Giffen and H.T. McLaughlin who came from Egypt in the 1890s. They started churches in the southern part of the country, in Dolleib Hill and the first pastor is Rev/ Laa Amoleker from Dolleib Hill, in 1902 leaving the northern congregations to Egyiptian evangelicals. The northern churches become known as the Sudan Evangelical Presbyterian Church. Schools and hospitals were built. By 1945 schools and mission work were organised in Malakal, Wauglel, Obel, Bor and elsewhere. The first mission station was established in Malakal.

In 1962 the missionaries left, but the church spread rapidly. It is the third largest denomination in Sudan after the Episcopal and the Roman Catholic Church.

Partner churches are the Church of Scotland, the Presbyterian Church in Ireland, the Presbyterian Church of Australia, the Presbyterian Church (USA) and the Reformed Church in America.

The church subscribes to the Apostles Creed, Nicene Creed, Heidelberg Catechism and the Westminster Confession of Faith.

It is a member of the World Communion of Reformed Churches.

== See also ==
- Protestantism in Sudan
