= Sudan Interior Church =

- Classification: Evangelical Christianity
- Theology: Baptist
- General secretary: Ramadan Chan
- Headquarters: Khartoum, Sudan
- Origin: 1963
- Congregations: 469
- Members: 133,000

Sudan Interior Church is a Baptist Christian denomination, affiliated with the Baptist World Alliance, in Sudan. The headquarters is in Khartoum. The general secretary is Ramadan Chan.

== History ==
Sudan Interior Church has its origins in Sudan Interior Mission, an American mission of Society for International Ministries (now Serving In Mission) in 1936. Sudan Interior Church is founded in 1963. In 2014, it had 120 churches and 25,000 members. According to a census published by the association in 2023, it claimed 469 churches and 133,000 members.

== See also ==
- World Evangelical Alliance
- Believers' Church
