= Daniel Marco Kur Adwok =

Sudanese Catholic prelate (born 1952)

The Most Reverend Daniel Marco Kur Adwok
- Auxiliary Bishop of Khartoum, Sudan
- Church: Catholic Church
- Archdiocese: Roman Catholic Archdiocese of Khartoum
- See: Khartoum
- Appointed: 6 October 1992
- Installed: 19 February 1993

Orders
- Ordination: 29 May 1977 by Ubaldo Calabresi
- Consecration: 19 February 1993 by Gabriel Zubeir Wako
- Rank: Bishop

Personal details
- Born: Daniel Marco Kur Adwok; 25 November 1952 (age 73) Atar, Prefecture Apostolic of Malakal, Sudan

Styles of Daniel Marco Kur Adwok
- Reference style: Your Eminence; The Most Reverend
- Spoken style: His Eminence
- Religious style: Bishop

Daniel Marco Kur Adwok (born 25 November 1952) is a Sudanese Catholic prelate who is the Auxiliary Bishop of the Roman Catholic Archdiocese of Khartoum in Sudan since 6 October 1992. He was concurrently assigned Titular Bishop of Moxori. Before that, from 29 May 1977 until he was appointed bishop, he was a priest of the same Catholic archdiocese. He was appointed bishop by Pope John Paul II. He was consecrated bishop at Khartoum on 19 February 1993.

== Background and education ==
He was born on 25 November 1952 in Atar, Prefecture Apostolic of Malakal in Sudan. He studied Philosophy and Theology at seminary, before he was ordained a priest.

== Priest ==
On 29 May 1977, he was ordained a priest for the Archdiocese of Khartoum by Ubaldo Calabresi, Titular Archbishop of Fundi and Apostolic Nuncio to Sudan. He served a priest until 6 October 1992.

== Bishop ==
On 6 October 1992, Pope John Paul II appointed Reverend Father Daniel Marco Kur Adwok, of the clergy of Khartoum as Auxiliary Bishop of Khartoum, in Sudan and concurrently assigned him Titular Bishop of Moxori. He was consecrated on 19 February 1993 at the Saint Paul's Church at Kosti. The Principal Consecrator was Gabriel Zubeir Wako, Archbishop of Khartoum assisted by Erwin Josef Ender, Titular Archbishop of Germania in Numidia and Paulino Lukudu Loro, Archbishop of Juba. He continues to serve in that capacity in very difficult security and social situations, as of 2023.

Bishop Kur Adwok has witnessed and has been a victim of the civil wars in both Sudan and South Sudan, since 2013.

== See also ==
- Catholic Church in Sudan

== Succession table ==
Catholic Church titles
Preceded by	Auxiliary Bishop of Khartoum (since 6 October 1992)	Succeeded by Incumbent
