= Yunan Tombe Trille Kuku Andali =

Sudanese Roman Catholic prelate (born 1964)

The Most Reverend Yunan Tombe Trille Kuku Andali
- Bishop of El Obeid, Sudan
- Church: Catholic Church
- Archdiocese: Roman Catholic Archdiocese of Khartoum
- See: Roman Catholic Diocese of El Obeid
- Appointed: 13 February 2017
- Installed: 23 April 2017
- Predecessor: Michael Didi Adgum Mangoria
- Successor: Incumbent

Orders
- Ordination: 7 April 1991
- Consecration: 23 April 2017 by Cardinal Gabriel Zubeir Wako

Personal details
- Born: Yunan Tombe Trille Kuku Andali; 1 January 1964 (age 62) Tojoro, Diocese of El Obeid, North Kordofan, Sudan
- Motto: "Lucem et pax" (Light and peace)

Styles of Yunan Tombe Trille Kuku Andali
- Reference style: His Eminence
- Spoken style: Your Eminence
- Religious style: Monsignor

Yunan Tombe Trille Kuku Andali (born 1 January 1964) is a Sudanese prelate of the Catholic Church who is the Bishop of the Roman Catholic Diocese of El Obeid, in Sudan since 13 February 2017. Before then, from 7 April 1991 until he was appointed bishop, he was a priest of the same Catholic diocese. He was appointed bishop by Pope Francis. He was consecrated bishop on 23 April 2017.

== Early life and education ==
He was born on 1 January 1964, at Tojoro, Diocese of El Obeid, North Kordofan, Sudan. He studied at the Comboni Junior School in El Obeid, where he completed his secondary school education. He studied Philosophy at an institution in Juba. He then studied Theology at a seminary in Khartoum, graduating with a Bachelor's degree. He holds a Licentiate and a Doctorate in Canon Law, awarded by the Catholic University of Eastern Africa in Nairobi, Kenya.

== Priest ==
On 7 April 1991, he was ordained a priest for the Roman Catholic Diocese of El Obeid. He served as a priest until 13 February 2017. While a priest, he served in various roles and locations, including as:

- Assistant parish priest in El Nahud, Nayala, El Fasher and Kadaguli from 1991 until 1995.
- Rector of the Minor Seminary in El Obeid from 1995 until 2002.
- Vicar General of the Diocese of El Obeid from 1997 until 2002.
- Studies leading to the award of a Licentiate and a Doctorate in canon law at the Catholic University of Eastern Africa in Nairobi, Kenya, from 2002 until 2009.
- Parish priest at All Saints Parish in Saraf Jamus from 2009 until 2012.
- Rector of the Saint Paul Inter-diocesan Seminary in Juba from 2012 until 2017.

== Bishop ==
On 13 February 2017, Pope Francis appointed Reverend Father Yunan Tombe Trille Kuku Andali, of the clergy of El Obeid, previously Rector of Saint Paul Major Seminary in Juba, as Bishop of the Diocese of El Obeid, in Sudan.

He was consecrated bishop on 23 April 2017 at the grounds of the El Obeid Comboni School, in El Obeid, Diocese of El Obeid, Sudan. The Principal Consecrator was Cardinal Gabriel Cardinal Zubeir Wako, Archbishop Emeritus of Khartoum, assisted by Hubertus Matheus Maria van Megen, Titular Archbishop of Novaliciana (Papal Nuncio) and Michael Didi Adgum Mangoria, Archbishop of Khartoum. As of December 2024, he was the local ordinary at El Obeid, under very difficult security and social conditions.

== See also ==
- Catholic Church in South Sudan

== Succession table ==
Catholic Church titles
Preceded by Michael Didi Adgum Mangoria (28 October 2013 - 15 August 2015)	Bishop of El Obeid (since 13 February 2017)	Succeeded by Incumbent
