= St. Matthew's Cathedral, Khartoum =

Coordinates: 15.6105°N 32.5339°E

St. Matthew's Cathedral
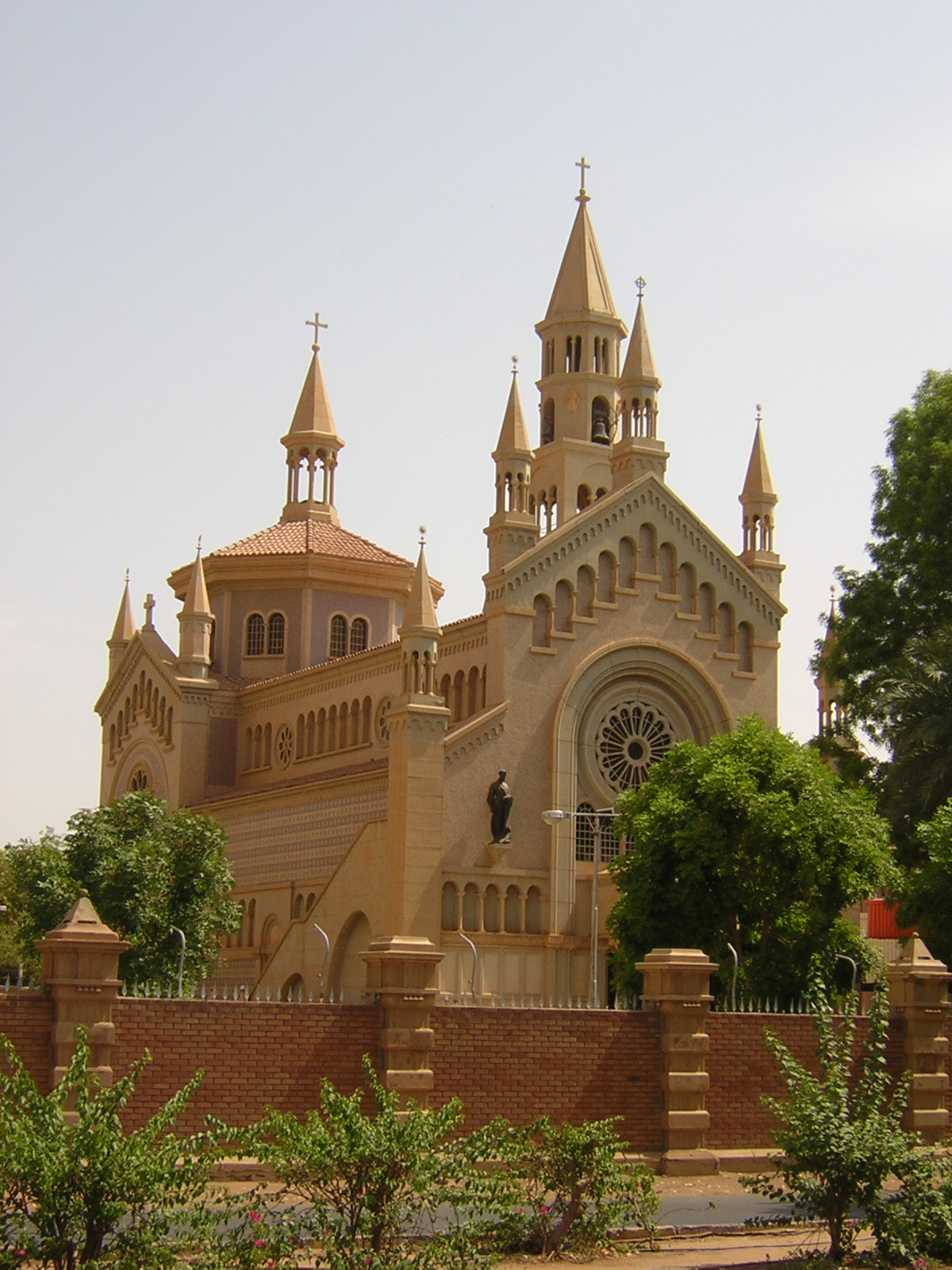
- St. Matthew's Cathedral
- Location: Khartoum
- Country: Sudan
- Denomination: Catholic Church

St. Matthew's Cathedral is a Catholic church in Khartoum, which is the capital of Sudan. The cathedral is located on the banks of the Blue Nile, next to the Mac Nimir Bridge. It is the seat of the Archbishop of Khartoum, though the bishop is currently displaced due to the ongoing Sudanese civil war.

The church was dedicated under the patronage of Saint Matthew the Apostle. This building resembles a fairy-tale castle with its various turrets, slender spires and a large rose window.

== History ==
The Apostolic Vicariate of Sudan or Central-Africa was erected here in 1846 under the primacy of Msgr. Annetto Casolani. A small church was built in 1847 to serve as the cathedral church. The Apostolic Vicariate was entrusted in 1872 to the Missionaries of the Sacred Heart, under Saint Daniel Comboni, who was apostolic vicar from 1872 until his death in 1881.

The city was taken by the Mahdist troops in 1885, who destroyed the church and all missions in the country. The war ended in 1898 with the Battle of Omdurman, and missionary work recommenced the following year. When the British built the modern city of Khartoum as capital of the Anglo-Egyptian Sudan, a new cathedral was constructed. It was completed in 1908 in neo-Romanesque style, featuring three naves and a high tower.

Pietro Laffranchi (Cemmo, 1899 – Khartoum, 1961) was an Italian Comboni missionary and master builder who designed and constructed the Cathedral of Khartoum between 1932 and December 1933, introducing the use of reinforced concrete and innovative construction techniques to Sudan.

=== Modern ===
Amid the Sudanese civil war, which began in 2023, the Archbishop of Khartoum, Michael Didi Adgum Mangoria, was forced to flee across the border to Port Sudan, where he remains as of October 2024. The building interior and exterior was heavily damaged during the Battle of Khartoum, although the structure itself is stable.

== See also ==
- Roman Catholicism in Sudan

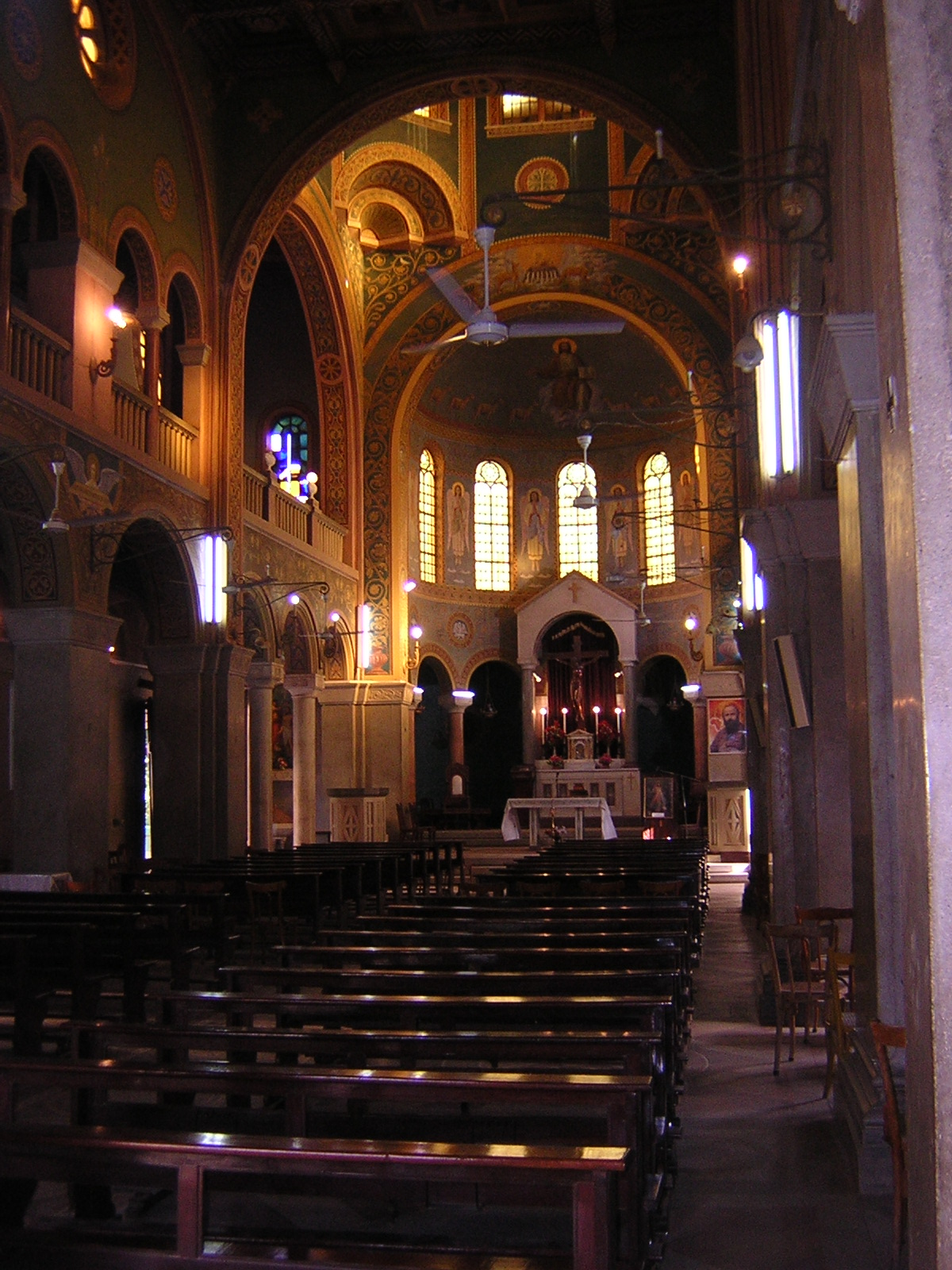
Internal View
