= St lwanga Catholic School, Malakal =

Catholic school in Malakal, South Sudan

Information
- Religious affiliation(s): Catholic
- Established: 1985; 40 years ago
- Founder: Vincent Mojwok Nyiker

St lwanga Catholic School is a school in Malakal, South Sudan. It was formed by the Bishop of Malakal, emeritus Vincent Mojwok Nyiker in 1985.

It was divided into two sections. The basic section was in Mudiria and the secondary section was in Malakia. From 2009 - 2013, the principal of the school was Sister Mary Mumbi Mariga. The headmaster of the school was Teacher Amum Agwok and the secretary was Anthony Wanth.
