= Voli =

Ancient town of Romans north Africa

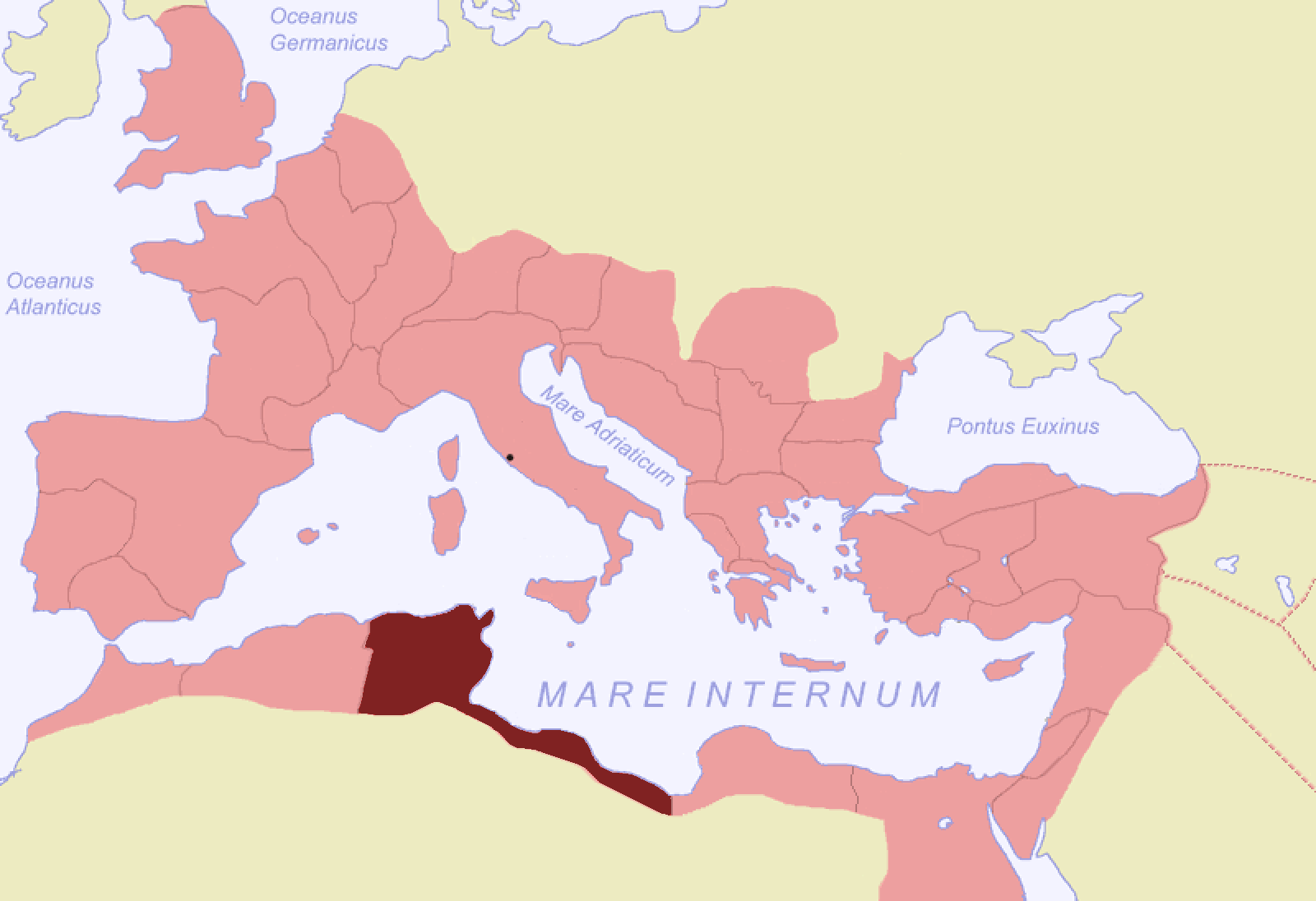
Africa proconsularis SPQR

Volitanus also known as Voli and Bolitana was a Roman era civitas (town) of Africa Proconsularis, a suffragan metropolis of Carthage in Roman North Africa.

== Location ==
The town of Voli is now in modern Tunisia, though the exact location of Voli is not known for certain The village of Sidi Medien Zaghouan province (latitude 36°20'3.57", longitude 10°5'22.15") has been suggested due to similarity of names. The issue with Sidi Medien is that here the Roman Era town appears to have been a colonia, by the name of Vallitanus (Vallis) while the name of Voli was probably Bolitana.

== Bishopric ==
The town was a seat of a Bishopric in Africa Proconsularis and suffran to Cartagine, it remains a titular see of the Roman Catholic Church.

Augustine records that the Diocese of Carthage celebrated the feast day of the martyrs of Bolitana on 17 October.

The deacon Peregrinus of Bolitana civitas who was martyred under Diocletian after his conviction by the proconsul Caius Annius Anullinus He has a feast day of 23 April.

In 411 rival bishops Crispus (Catholic) and Quodvultdeus (Donatist) attended the Council of Carthage (411). The Council found for Crispus. In 418, Bishop Muranus (Catholic) attended the Council of Carthage, and in 484 Bonifatius (Catholic). attended the Council of Huneric, king of the Vandals.

The current bishop is Janusz S. Urbanczyk, who replaced Emil Paul Tscherrig, (4 May 1996 - 30 September 2023 created Cardinal deacon of San Giuseppe in Via Trionfale)
