= Macram Max Gassis =

Roman Catholic prelate (1938–2023)

His Excellency Macram Max Gassis
- Bishop Emertus of El Obeid
- Archdiocese: Khartoum
- Appointed: 12 March 1988
- Term ended: 28 October 2013
- Predecessor: Paulino Lukudu Loro
- Successor: Michael Didi Adgum Mangoria

Orders
- Ordination: 28 June 1964 by Gregorio Pietro Agagianian
- Consecration: 15 May 1988 by Luis Robles Díaz

Personal details
- Born: 21 September 1938 Khartoum, Sudan
- Died: 4 June 2023 (aged 84) Mechanicsburg, Pennsylvania, U.S.

Macram Max Gassis (21 September 1938 – 4 June 2023) was a Sudanese Roman Catholic prelate. He served as bishop of El Obeid from 1988 to 2013.

== Early life and education ==
Gassis was born in Khartoum on 21 September 1938. He attended a school run by missionaries from the Comboni Congregation in his native Khartoum. In the years 1955-1964 he received his philosophical and theological education in Great Britain and Italy in Comboni seminaries. In 1957, he took religious vows. In 1964 he was ordained a priest in Verona. After returning to Sudan, Gassis was a parish vicar in Wad Medani in the central part of the country. He then worked as a pastor in the parishes of Gedaref, Kassala and New Halfa in the eastern part of the country. In 1971 he became chancellor of the diocesan curia. From 1973 to 1983, he was secretary general of the Sudanese Bishops' Conference. In 1979, he earned a degree in canon law and administration from the Catholic University of America in Washington, D.C.

== Ministry ==
From 1983 to 1988, Gassis was the apostolic administrator of Al-Ubayid. On May 15, 1988, he was ordained a bishop and became the Ordinary of the Diocese of Al-Ubayid. As the only Arabic-speaking bishop of the Sudanese Episcopal Conference, he held talks with government officials. The Sudanese government filed an indictment against Gassis after he made a statement to the US Congress in which he informed about crimes committed by the authorities against his own people. For his activities in defense of the Christian population of his country and calling for respect for human rights by the government in Khartoum, Gassis was awarded many prizes. He continued to travel around Europe and North America, asking for help in enforcing human rights in Sudan. He informed the public about the religious persecution of the Christian population, the bombing of human settlements, terrorism, hunger and murders.

== Retirement and death ==
In 2011, Gassis visited Poland on the occasion of the Third Day of Solidarity with the Persecuted Church. On 28 October 2013, Pope Francis accepted his resignation due to his retirement age. Gassis was succeeded by Michael Didi Adgum Mangoria.

Gassis died in Mechanicsburg, Pennsylvania on 4 June 2023, at the age of 84.

Catholic Church titles
Preceded by Paulino Lukudu Loro	Bishop of El Obeid; 1988–2013	Succeeded by Michael Didi Adgum Mangoria
