= Diocese of El Obeid =

Roman Catholic diocese in Sudan

Coordinates: 13.1808°N 30.2197°E

Diocese of El Obeid Dioecesis Elobeidensis
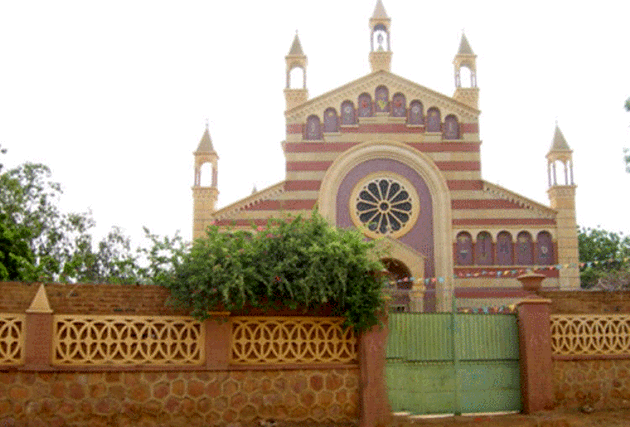

Location
- Country: Sudan

Statistics
- Area: 88.939 km^{2} (34.340 sq mi)
- Population: Total; Catholics: 12857215; 97420 (0.8%)
- Parishes: 17

Information
- Denomination: Catholic Church
- Rite: Roman
- Established: May 10, 1960
- Archdiocese: Archdiocese of Khartoum
- Cathedral: Our Lady Queen of Africa Cathedral
- Secular priests: 31

Current leadership
- Bishop: Yunan Tombe Trille Kuku Andali

Overview of Roman Catholic Dioceses in Sudan and South Sudan. 1 Diocese of El Obeid 2 Archdiocese of Khartoum 3 Diocese of Wau 4 Diocese of Rumbek 5 Diocese of Malakal 6 Diocese of Tombura-Yambio 7 Diocese of Yei 8 Archdiocese of Juba 9 Diocese of Torit

The Roman Catholic Diocese of El Obeid (Latin: Elobeiden(sis)) is a diocese in El-Obeid in the ecclesiastical province of Khartoum in Sudan.

== History ==
- May 10, 1960: Established as Apostolic Vicariate of El Obeid from Apostolic Vicariate of Khartoum
- December 12, 1974: Promoted as Diocese of El Obeid

== Sudanese Civil War ==
At the beginning of the Sudanese Civil War, El Obeid remained under the control of the Sudanese Armed Forces, but was surrounded by the Rapid Support Forces, who shelled the city. In an interview with international charity Aid to the Church in Need, bishop Yunan Andali explained that the cathedral was in the hot zone when the war began because it was located between military barracks, a police station and a building belonging to the security forces. Several military personnel sought refuge in the cathedral during the first days of shelling.

Throughout the war, Andali continued to provide spiritual and material support to the 300 Catholic families in El Obeid. The Catholic Church operates six kindergartens, six primary schools and one secondary school in El Obeid, and these are the only educational institutions that remain open, according to Bishop Tombe, a fact that earned the Church compliments from the authorities.

In June 2025 news emerged of the death of Fr Luka Jomo, a Catholic priest in the city of El Fasher. The priest was killed by a stray fire during an attack by the Rapid Support Forces. The Diocese of El Obeid, which covers El Fasher, confirmed his death, but said in a statement that it did not believe he had been intentionally targeted.

== Special churches ==
The Cathedral is Our Lady Queen of Africa Cathedral in El Obeid.

== Bishops ==
- Vicar Apostolic of El Obeid (Roman rite)
  - Bishop Edoardo Mason, M.C.C.I. (1960.05.10 – 1969)
- Bishops of El Obeid (Roman rite)
  - Bishop Paulino Lukudu Loro, M.C.C.I. (1979.03.05 – 1983.02.19), appointed Archbishop of Juba
  - Bishop Macram Max Gassis, M.C.C.I. (1988.03.12 – 2013.10.28)
  - Bishop Michael Didi Adgum Mangoria (2013.10.28 - 2015.08.15); appointed by Pope Francis to be Coadjutor Archbishop to Cardinal Gabriel Zubeir Wako, of the Roman Catholic Archdiocese of Khartoum, in Khartoum, Sudan; was to serve as El Obeid's Apostolic Administrator during the sede vacante (vacant see period) until a new Bishop was selected
  - Bishop Yunan Tombe Trille Kuku Andali (2017.02.18 - present)

Another apostolic administrator was Bishop Antonio Menegazzo, M.C.C.I. (1996-2010)

=== Coadjutor Bishop ===
- Michael Didi Adgum Mangoria (2010-2013)

== See also ==
- Josephine Bakhita
- Roman Catholicism in Sudan

== Sources ==
- Diocese of El Obeid. GCatholic
- Cathedral of Our Lady Queen of Africa
- Diocese of El Obeid website
