= Stephen Nyodho Ador Majwok =

South Sudanese Roman Catholic prelate (born 1973)

The Most Reverend Stephen Nyodho Ador Majwok
- Bishop of Malakal, South Sudan
- Church: Catholic Church
- Archdiocese: Roman Catholic Archdiocese of Juba
- See: Roman Catholic Diocese of Malakal
- Appointed: 23 May 2019
- Installed: 28 July 2019
- Predecessor: Vincent Mojwok Nyiker
- Successor: Incumbent

Orders
- Ordination: 15 May 2005 by Vincent Mojwok Nyiker
- Consecration: 28 July 2019 by Paulino Lukudu Loro

Personal details
- Born: Stephen Nyodho Ador Majwok; 1 January 1973 (age 53) Andong, Diocese of Malakal, Upper Nile State, South Sudan

Styles of Stephen Nyodho Ador Majwok
- Reference style: His Eminence
- Spoken style: Your Eminence
- Religious style: Monsignor

Stephen Nyodho Ador Majwok (born 1 January 1973) is a South Sudanese prelate of the Catholic Church who has served as the Bishop of the Roman Catholic Diocese of Malakal, in South Sudan since 23 May 2019. He previously served as a priest of the same Catholic diocese. He was appointed bishop by Pope Francis. He was consecrated bishop on 28 July 2019, at Christ the King Cathedral, in Malakal.

== Early life and education ==
He was born on 1 January 1973, at Andong, Diocese of Malakal, Upper Nile State, in South Sudan. From 1982 until 1989, he attended primary schools in Adong and Thawrat Malakal. From 1990 until 1977 he studied at the Saint Lwanga Institute. He studied Philosophy at the Saint Paul National Major Seminary in Khartoum, Sudan from 1997 until 2000, graduating with a Diploma in Philosophy. He continued his studies at the same seminary from 2000 until 2005, while studying Theology. In 2004, he graduated with a Bachelor's degree in Sacred Theology. He holds a Licentiate in Moral Theology, obtained from the Pontifical Urban University, in Rome, where he studied from 2013 until 2016. His Doctorate in Moral Theology was awarded by the Pontifical University of St. Thomas Aquinas, in Rome, where he studied from 2016 until 2018.

== Priest ==
He was ordained a deacon for the Diocese of Malakal on 14 November 2004. On 15 May 2005, he was ordained a priest for the same Catholic diocese. He served as a priest until 23 May 2019. While a priest, he served in various roles and locations including as:

- Parish Vicar of the Christ the King Cathedral, Malakal from 2005 until 2008.
- Interim parish priest of the Christ the King Cathedral from 2008 until 2009.
- Director of the Diocesan Center for Pastoral Care from 2008 until 2009.
- Priest of the Diocesan Cathedral from 2009 until 2013.
- Diocesan Coordinator for pastoral courses from 2009 until 2013.
- Diocesan Youth Chaplain from 2009 until 2013.
- Member of the College of Diocesan Consultors from 2009 until 2013.
- Member of the diocesan investment group from 2009 until 2013.
- Studies in Rome at the Pontifical Urban University leading to the award of a Licentiate in Moral Theology from 2013 until 2016.
- Studies in Rome at the Pontifical University of St. Thomas Aquinas leading to the award of a Doctorate in Moral Theology from 2016 until 2018.
- Vicar General of the Diocese of Malakal in 2019.

== Bishop ==
On 23 May 2019, Pope Francis appointed the Reverend Father Stephen Nyodho Ador Majwok, of the clergy of Malakal, previously Vicar General of the same diocese as the Bishop of the Diocese of Malakal, South Sudan. He was consecrated bishop at Christ the King Cathedral in Malakal on 28 July 2019 by Paulino Lukudu Loro, Archbishop of Juba assisted by Hubertus Matheus Maria van Megen, Titular Archbishop of Novaliciana and Michael Didi Adgum Mangoria, Archbishop of Khartoum. In December 2022 he condemned violence among the people in his episcopal diocese and "called for peace and unity among the various communities".

In a 2026 interview with pontifical charity Aid to the Church in Need, the bishop described what he found when he arrived at his diocese, following several years in Rome: "When I went back, there was nothing, not even a chair or table, nothing. I had to start from zero. Many churches, many chapels, including all the other institutions of the Church had been destroyed, nothing remained. When I first saw it, I cried, because this was the town where I was born, where I grew up. But my house, my school, everything was gone". He then describes his efforts at rebuilding the Church in Malakal, and attributes his decision to remain in the city, despite the destruction, as a factor in its revival. "The fact I stayed in Malakal brought hope. Now there are more than 20,000 people. Almost all the schools are open, and they are full of children. Life is coming back!"

== See also ==
- Catholic Church in South Sudan

== Succession table ==
Catholic Church titles
Preceded by Vincent Mojwok Nyiker (15 March 1979 - 16 May 2009)	Bishop of Malakal (since 23 May 2019)	Succeeded by Incumbent
