= Stephen Ameyu Martin Mulla =

South Sudanese Roman Catholic prelate

His Eminence Stephen Ameyu Martin Mulla
- Cardinal, Archbishop of Juba
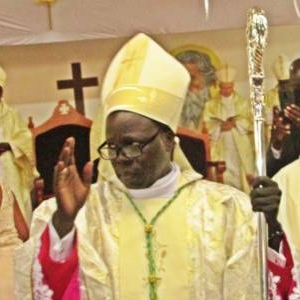
- Ameyu in September 2022
- Church: Catholic Church
- Archdiocese: Juba
- See: Juba
- Appointed: 12 December 2019
- Installed: 22 March 2020
- Predecessor: Paulino Lukudu Loro
- Other posts: Vice-President of the Episcopal Conference of Sudan and South Sudan (2020-); Cardinal-Priest of Santa Gemma Galgani (2023–)
- Previous posts: Bishop of Torit (2019); Apostolic Administrator of Torit (2020-22); Apostolic Administrator of Wau (2020)

Orders
- Ordination: 21 April 1991
- Consecration: 3 March 2019 by Paulino Lukudu Loro
- Created cardinal: 30 September 2023 by Pope Francis
- Rank: Cardinal-Priest

Personal details
- Born: Stephen Ameyu Martin Mulla; 10 January 1964 (age 62) Ido, Eastern Equatoria, Sudan
- Education: Pontifical Urban University
- Coat of arms

Stephen Ameyu Martin Mulla (born 10 January 1964) is a South Sudanese Catholic prelate who has served as Archbishop of Juba since 12 December 2019. Immediately prior to that, he served as Bishop of Torit from 3 January 2019 until 12 December 2019. He was made a cardinal on 30 September 2023, by Pope Francis.

== Biography ==
Stephen Ameyu Martin Mulla was born in Ido in the Diocese of Torit in the Equatoria region of Sudan, now in South Sudan, on 10 January 1964. He attended the minor seminary in Torit from 1978 to 1981 and that in Wau from 1981 to 1983. He then studied briefly at the Saint Paul National Major Seminary, followed by philosophy at the seminary of Bussere (Wau) from 1984 to 1987 and theology in Munuki (Juba) from 1988 to 1991. He was ordained a priest of the Diocese of Torit on 21 April 1991 for the diocese of Torit. He then filled a variety of pastoral assignments for three years.

From 1993 to 1997 he studied at the Pontifical Urban University, earning a doctorate in dogmatic theology, with a thesis titled "Verso il dialogo religioso e la riconciliazione in Sudan" ("Towards religious dialogue and reconciliation in Sudan") and from then until 2019 was a lecturer and dean of the Saint Paul National Major Seminary in Juba. He taught evening classes at the Comboni College for Adults and Teachers from 1998 to 2000 and was a lecturer and consultant for the local Sudanese organization for non-violence and democracy (SONAD) from 1999 to 2008. He founded a local humanitarian NGO, the Horiok Community Association and Development (HODA) in 2005 and worked there as a consultant and counsellor for five years. He worked in a similar capacity for women's rights organizations from 2013 to 2016, and then from 2016 to 2019 as assistant vice chancellor for Administration and Finance of the Catholic University of South Sudan and deputy director of the Institute of Applied Research and Community Outreach there.

On 3 January 2019, Pope Francis appointed him bishop of Torit, a see which had been without a bishop for five years. He received his episcopal consecration on 3 March of that year from Paulino Lukudu Loro, Archbishop of Juba.

On 12 December 2019, Pope Francis promoted him to archbishop of Juba and he was both installed there on 22 March 2020 and named apostolic administrator of Torit the same day. His appointment as archbishop met with some opposition, possibly tied to ethnic divisions, that included charges of improper influence and unsuitability, which Pope Francis reviewed and nevertheless confirmed the appointment on 6 March. Those who opposed Ameyu's appointment said that they had no objection based on tribal affiliation, though they were Bari and Ameyu is Otuho.

Since January 2020, he has been vice president of the Catholic Conference of Bishops of Sudan and South Sudan. In 2024 he also became president of the Catholic Conference.

He also served as apostolic administrator of the Diocese of Wau from September 2020 to January 2021.

He served as host for Pope Francis' visit to South Sudan in February 2023.

On 9 July 2023, Pope Francis announced he plans to make him a cardinal at a consistory scheduled for 30 September. At that consistory he was made Cardinal-Priest of Santa Gemma Galgani a Monte Sacro. He participated as a cardinal elector in the 2025 papal conclave that elected Pope Leo XIV.

== See also ==
- Cardinals created by Francis
