= Sant'Atanasio a Via Tiburtina =

Church of Saint Athanasius on Via Tiburtina
- Sant'Atanasio a Via Tiburtina (in Italian); S. Athanasii ad viam Tiburtinam (in Latin)
- Click on the map for a fullscreen view
- 41°54′43.18″N 12°32′39.63″E
- Location: Via Achille Benedetti 11, Rome
- Country: Italy
- Denomination: Roman Catholic
- Tradition: Roman Rite
- Website: Official website

History
- Status: Titular church
- Dedication: Athanasius of Alexandria
- Consecrated: 1961

Architecture
- Architect: Ernesto Vichi
- Architectural type: Church

Administration
- District: Diocese of Rome

The Church of Saint Athanasius on Via Tiburtina (Italian: Sant'Atanasio a Via Tiburtina, Latin: S. Athanasii ad viam Tiburtinam) is a Roman Catholic titular church in Rome, built as a parish church. It was consecrated 11 March 1961 by Cardinal Clemente Micara. On 28 June 1991 Pope John Paul II granted it a titular church as a seat for Cardinals.

The present Cardinal Priest of the Titulus San Athanasii ad viam Tiburtinam is Gabriel Zubeir Wako.

== Architecture ==
The structure of the church is in a Greek Cross, with four large windows, each representing respectively the Eucharistic symbols of the body and blood, Saint Athanasius, and the Holy Spirit. The main altar is semicircular, and of granite with the Last Supper in the background. Left of the altar is a picture of the eighteenth-century painting of the Assumption, and on the right is a baptismal font with travertine dome, closed by a cover bronze statue of John the Baptist.

== List of Cardinal-Priests ==
- Alexandru Todea (28 June 1991 – 22 May 2002)
- Gabriel Zubeir Wako (21 October 2003 – present)
