= Michael Didi Adgum Mangoria =

Sudanese Catholic prelate (born 1959)

The Most Reverend Michael Didi Adgum Mangoria
- Archbishop of Khartoum, Sudan
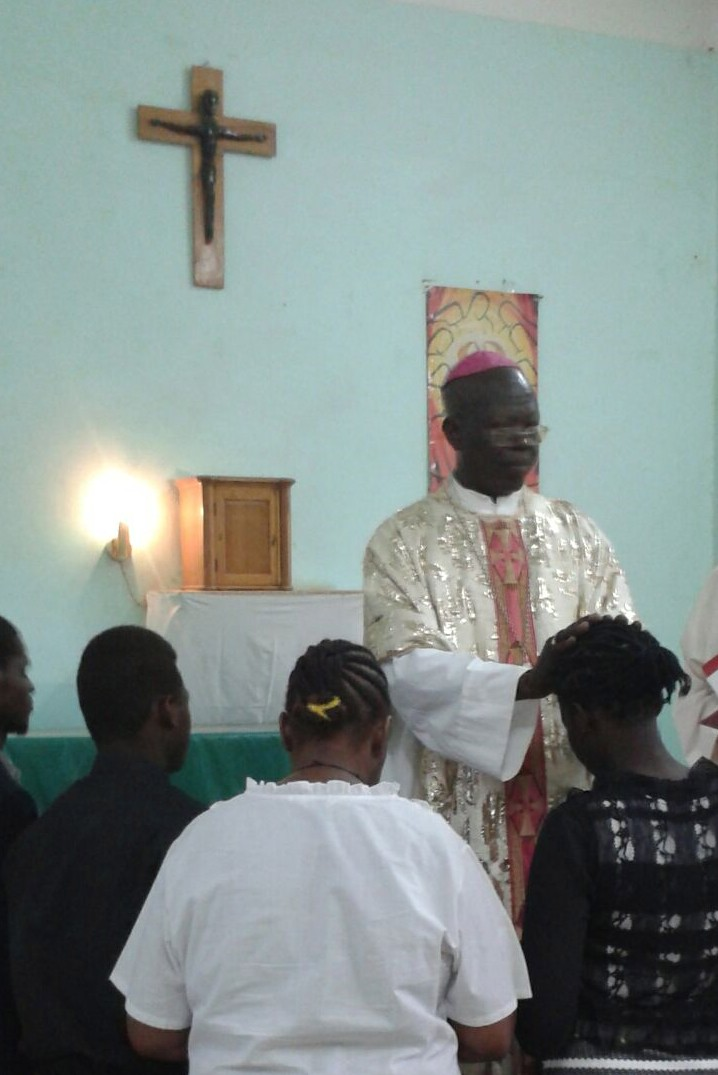
- Archbishop Michael Didi of Khartoum
- Church: Catholic Church
- Archdiocese: Roman Catholic Archdiocese of Khartoum
- See: Khartoum
- Appointed: 15 August 2015 (Coadjutor)
- Installed: 9 December 2016
- Predecessor: Gabriel Zubeir Wako
- Successor: Incumbent

Orders
- Ordination: 10 May 1992
- Consecration: 15 August 2010 by Cardinal Gabriel Zubeir Wako
- Rank: Archbishop

Personal details
- Born: Michael Didi Adgum Mangoria; 1 January 1959 (age 67) Engoth, Diocese of El Obeid, North Kordofan, Sudan

Styles of Michael Didi Adgum Mangoria
- Reference style: Your Lordship; The Most Reverend
- Spoken style: His Lordship
- Religious style: Bishop

Michael Didi Adgum Mangoria (born 1 January 1959) is a Sudanese Catholic prelate who is the archbishop of the Roman Catholic Archdiocese of Khartoum in Sudan, since 9 December 2016. Prior to that, from 15 August 2015, until 9 December 2016, he was a Coadjutor Archbishop of the same Catholic Archdiocese. Before then, he was Bishop of the Diocese of El Obeid, from 28 October 2013 until 15 August 2015. He served as Coadjutor Bishop of the diocese of El Obeid from 29 May 2010 until 28 October 2013. For the period from 15 August 2010 until 28 October 2013, while Coadjutor Bishop at El Obeid, he concurrently served as Apostolic Administrator of that Catholic diocese. He was appointed bishop by Pope Benedict XVI. He was consecrated bishop on 15 August 2010.

== Background and education ==
He was born on 1 January 1959 in Engoth, Diocese of El Obeid, North Kordofan, in Sudan. He attended Saint Joseph Technical School in Khartoumha for his primary schooling. He then transferred to the Comboni College of Khartoum and later to the Saint Mary's National Seminary at Nazareth-Wau, where he completed his secondary school studies. He studied at the Khartoum Minor Seminary in Khartoum. He studied at the Saint Paul's National Seminary in Busare, Diocese of Wau, from 1985 until 1987. He studied at seminaries at Munuki, Archdiocese of Juba from 1987 until 1989 and at the Archdiocese of Khartoum from 1989 until 1992. In 2001, he obtained a Doctorate in Canon Law from the Pontifical Urban University in Rome.

== Priest ==
On 10 May 1992, he was ordained a priest for the Roman Catholic Diocese of Khartoum. He served as a priest until 29 May 2010. While a priest, he served in various roles and locations including as:

- Pastor of Saint Bakita to Jabarona for displaced people from 1992 until 1997.
- Studies at the Pontifical Urban University, from 1997 until 2001, where he graduated with doctorate in Canon Law in 2001.
- Member of council of priests from 2001 until 2008.
- Member of College of Consultants from 2004 until 2008.
- Professor of Canon Law and Member of the Sudan Inter-religious Council from 2001 until 2008.
- Rector of Saint Paul's Major Seminary in Khartoum from 2008 until 2010.

== Bishop ==
On 29 May 2010, Pope Benedict XVI appointed Reverend Father Michael Didi Adgum Mangoria, clergy of Khartoum, previously Rector of Saint Paul's National Seminary in Khartoum, as Coadjutor Bishop of the Diocese of El Obeid, in Sudan.

He was consecrated bishop on 15 August 2010 by Cardinal Gabriel Zubeir Wako, Archbishop of Khartoum assisted by Macram Max Gassis, Bishop of El Obeid and Antonio Menegazzo, Titular Bishop of Mesarfelta. Bishop Michael Didi Adgum Mangoria succeeded at El Obeid on 28 October 2013, the day Bishop Macram Max Gassis retired. On the day that Mangoria was consecrated, he started to serve as apostolic administrator at El Obeid. That administratorship ceased on 28 October 2013. On 15 August 2015, he was transferred to the Archdiocese of Khartoum as coadjutor bishop. He succeeded there on 9 December 2016, the day Bishop Emeritus Gabriel Cardinal Zubeir Wako retired. As at 2023, he continues to pastorally administer the Archdiocese of Khartoum in Sudan.

== See also ==
- Catholic Church in Sudan

== Succession table ==
Catholic Church titles
Preceded by Gabriel Zubeir Wako (10 October 1981 - 9 December 2016)	Archbishop of Khartoum (since 9 December 2016)	Succeeded by Incumbent
Preceded by	Coadjutor Archbishop of Khartoum (15 August 2015 - 9 December 2016)	Succeeded by
Preceded by Macram Max Gassis (12 March 1988 - 28 October 2013)	Bishop of El Obeid (28 October 2013 - 15 August 2015)	Succeeded by Yunan Tombe Trille Kuku Andali (since 13 February 2017)
Preceded by	Coadjutor Bishop of El Obeid (29 May 2010 - 28 October 2013)	Succeeded by
