= Archdiocese of Khartoum =

Roman Catholic archdiocese in Sudan

Archdiocese of Khartoum Archidioecesis Khartumensis
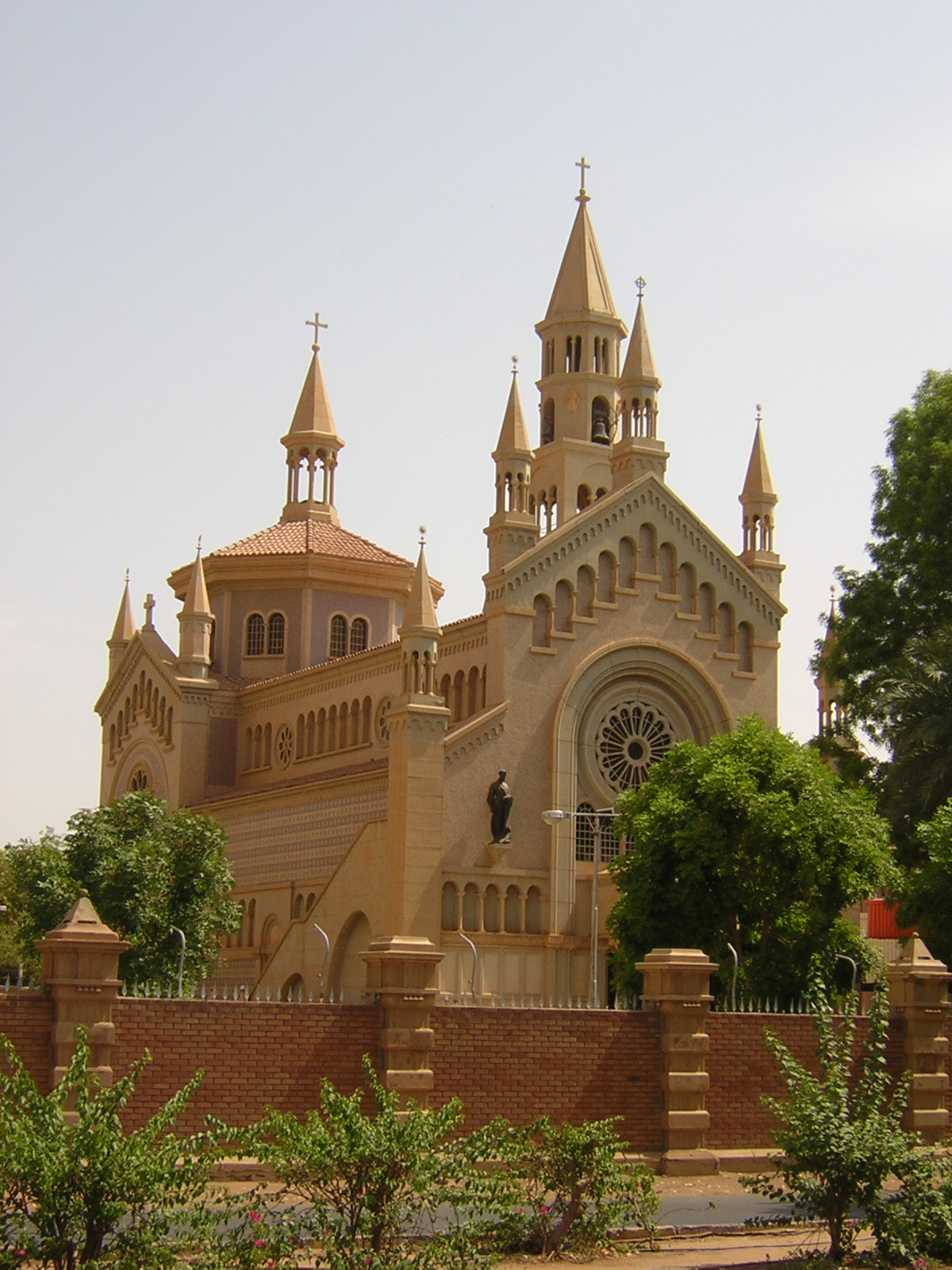
- St. Matthew's Cathedral

Location
- Country: Sudan
- Ecclesiastical province: Khartoum
- Coordinates: 15.6103°N 32.5339°E

Statistics
- Area: 981,000 km^{2} (379,000 sq mi)
- Population: Total; Catholics: (as of 2016); 29,020,000; 1,102,000 (3.8%)
- Parishes: 27

Information
- Denomination: Roman Catholic
- Sui iuris church: Latin Church
- Rite: Roman Rite
- Established: 12 December 1974
- Cathedral: St. Matthew's Cathedral, Khartoum
- Secular priests: 78

Current leadership
- Pope: Leo XIV
- Archbishop: Michael Didi Adgum Mangoria
- Auxiliary Bishops: Daniel Marco Kur Adwok
- Bishops emeritus: Gabriel Zubeir Wako

Map
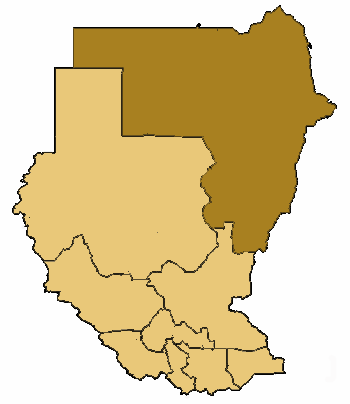

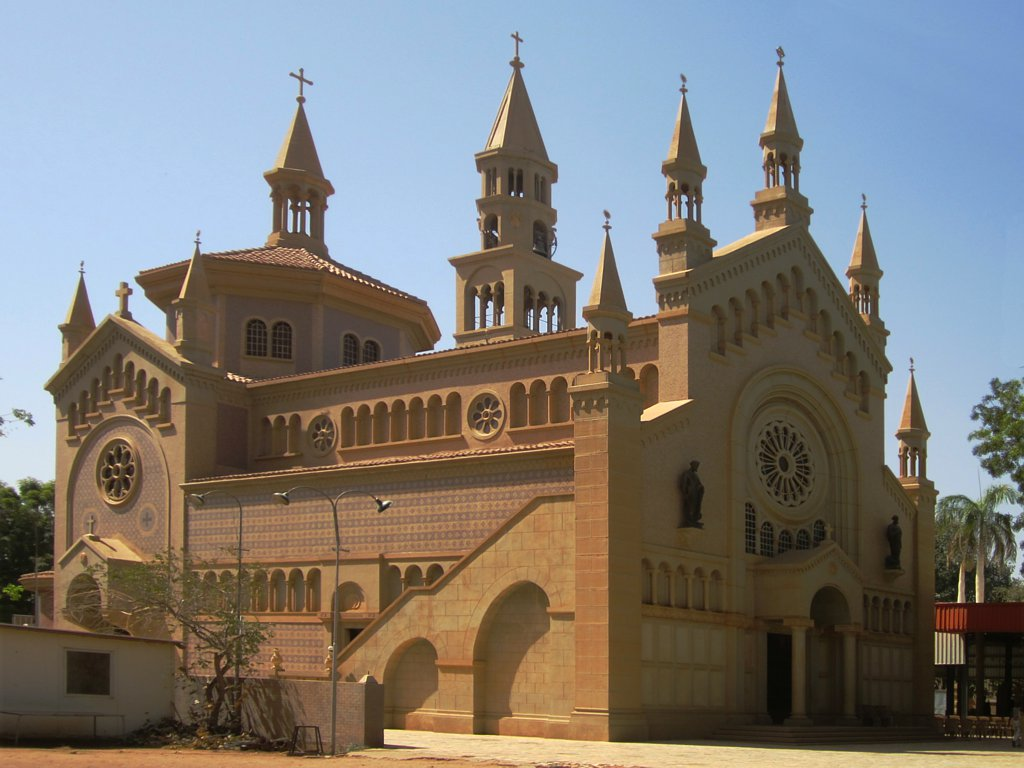
St. Matthew's Cathedral

The Archdiocese of Khartoum (Latin: Khartumen(sis)) is a Catholic jurisdiction within the Latin Church in Sudan, with its episcopal seat in the national capital of Khartoum. It is the head of an ecclesiastical province, including the suffragan Diocese of El Obeid, that covers the entirety of Sudan.

== History ==
On 3 April in 1846 it was established by pope Gregory XVI as Apostolic Vicariate of Central Africa, on vast territory split off from the Apostolic Vicariate of Egypt and Arabia (now reduce to the Apostolic Vicariate of Alexandria) in Egypt. Although it was initially headquartered in Egypt, it covered only the part of Egypt south of Assuan, where the population was primarily Nubians and the Anglo-Egyptian Sudan as well as French colonies Chad and Niger. It also included parts of Adamaua and Sokoto on Lake Chad, and the Nile Province of Uganda Protectorate. In 1851 the Emperor Francis Joseph I of Austria (a Catholic monarchy without overseas colonial interests) took the mission under his protection.

It was also known as the Apostolic Vicariate of Sudan (Latin: Vicariatus Apostolicus Africae Centralis), or in full Vicariate Apostolic of Sudan or Central-Africa, by the early 20th-century. It lost territory on 1880.09.27 to establish the Apostolic Vicariate of Tanganyika and again on October 27, 1880, to establish the Apostolic Vicariate of Nyanza (now the Archdiocese of Kampala), in Uganda.

From 1883 to 1898, the Sudan (then an Egyptian province) was closed by the insurrection of the Mahdi Mohammed Ahmed and his successor Abdallahi ibn Muhammad, and the missionaries were compelled to work outside the circuit of their jurisdiction in Egypt. On 2 September 1898, the Anglo-Egyptian army, which in 1896 had begun operations for the recovery of the lost provinces, completed the overthrow of the Khalifa, although he was not slain until November of the following year. The country suffered long from the effects of the 'Dervish' (Mahdist) oppression, during which it was largely depopulated, wide tracts having gone out of cultivation and trade having been abandoned.

In 1899 mission work was recommenced in Sudan. The two religious congregations, the Sons of the Sacred Heart and the Pious Mothers of Nigritia, furnished missionaries and sisters to the vicariate, and the two periodical papers La Nigrizia (The Africaness, in Verona, Italy) and Stern der Neger ('Star of the Africans', in Brixen, then imperial Austria) print articles about this mission. The number of inhabitants is uncertain, perhaps about eight millions. Missionary work was limited to the southern and animist part of the Anglo-Egyptian Sudan (primarily now in South Sudan) with the Shillouki Dinka, Nuer, Jur, Golo, Nyam Nyam and other Nilotic tribes. In the northern Muslim part were some European and Oriental Catholic immigrants.

In the early 20th century it included: — stations at Assuan (now in Egypt), Omdurman, Khartoum (central station); Lul and Atigo (White Nile); Wau, Kayango and 'Cleveland' (Bahrel-Ghazal); Omach and Gulu (Uganda); besides twenty-five localities provided excurrendo.

The membership under Apostolic Vicar Francis Xavier Geyer was Catholics, 3000; catechumens, 1030; priests, 35; brothers, 28; sisters, 45.

On 30 May 1913 it was renamed the Apostolic Vicariate of Khartum after its see, the present Sudanese capital, as its southern territory was split off to establish the Apostolic Prefecture of Bahr el-Ghazal, which is now the Diocese of Wau, somewhat approximating the split between Sudan and South Sudan. However it continued to cover Niger, Chad and stretched into modern Nigeria and Cameroon.

On 28 April 1914 the Apostolic Prefecture of Adamaua (now the Diocese of Nkongsamba) was formed, taking territory from the Apostolic Vicariate of Khartoum.

It lost territories again to establish missionary jurisdictions becoming current dioceses :

- on 1933.01.10 the Mission sui juris of Kodok (today the Diocese of Malakal, now in South Sudan)
- on 1942.04.28 the Apostolic Prefecture of Niamey (in French colony Niger, now the Metropolitan Roman Catholic Archdiocese of Niamey, )
- on 1947.01.09 the Apostolic Prefecture of Fort-Lamy (in French colony Chad, now the Metropolitan Roman Catholic Archdiocese of N'Djamena)
- on 1960.05.10 the Apostolic Vicariate of El Obeid (now its remaining suffragan Roman Catholic Diocese of El Obeid within Sudan).

On 12 December 1974, it was promoted as Metropolitan Archdiocese of Khartoum.

In February 1993, it enjoyed a Papal visit from Pope John Paul II.

== Special churches ==
The cathedral see of the Archbishop is St. Matthew's Cathedral, Khartoum.

== Bishops ==
Apostolic Vicars of Central Africa

- Annetto Casolani (1846.04.03 – retired 1847.05.02), Titular Bishop of Mauricastrum (1846.04.03 – death 1866.08.01)
- Daniele Comboni, F.C.C.I. (1872 – 1881.10.10), Titular Bishop of Claudiopolis (1877.07.02 – death 1881.10.10), previously Founder of Sons of the Sacred Heart of Jesus (Comboni Fathers) (1867.06.01)
- Francesco Sogaro (1882.10.04 – resigned 1895), Titular Bishop of Trapezopolis (1885.07.10 – 1894.08.18), promoted Titular Archbishop of Amida (1894.08.18 – 1912.02.06), later President of Pontifical Ecclesiastical Academy (1903 – 1912.02.06)
- Antonio Maria Roveggio, F.C.C.I. (1895.02.08 – death 1902.05.02), Titular Bishop of Amastris (1895.02.08 – 1902.05.02)
- Franz Xavier Geyer, M.C.C.I. (1903.08.06 – 1913.05.30 see below), Titular Bishop of Trocmades (1903.08.06 – death 1943.04.02)

Apostolic Vicars of Khartoum

- Franz Xavier Geyer, F.C.C.I. (1913.05.30 – retired May 1922)
- Paolo Tranquillo Silvestri, F.C.C.I. (1924.10.29 – retired July 1929), Titular Bishop of Jerichus (1924.11.05 – death 1949.01.22)
- Francesco Saverio Bini, F.C.C.I. (1930.11.20 – retired 1952), Titular Bishop of Vallis (1930.11.20 – death 1953.05.11)
- Agostino Baroni, F.C.C.I. (1953.06.29 – 1974.12.12 see below), Titular Bishop of Balecium (1953.06.29 – 1974.12.12)

Metropolitan Archbishops of Khartoum

- Archbishop Agostino Baroni, M.C.C.I. (see above 1974.12.12 – retired 1981.10.10), also Apostolic Administrator of Rumbek (now in South Sudan) (1982 – 1983)
- Cardinal Gabriel Zubeir Wako (since 1981.10.10 - 2016.12.10 ), succeeding as former Coadjutor Archbishop of Khartoum (1979.10.30 – 1981.10.10); previously Apostolic Administrator of above Rumbek (now in South Sudan) (1974 – 1976), Bishop of Wau (now in South Sudan) (1974.12.12 – 1979.10.30); also President of Sudan Bishops’ Conference (1978 – 1989, 1993 – 1999, 2012.01.01 – ...), created Cardinal-Priest of S. Atanasio a Via Tiburtina (2003.10.21 [2003.12.14] – ...)
  - Bishop Michael Didi Adgum Mangoria of the Roman Catholic Diocese of El Obeid, in El Obeid, Sudan, was named Coadjutor Archbishop of the Roman Catholic Archdiocese of Khartoum by Pope Francis on 15 August 2015 He later succeeded Wako as Archbishop of Khartoum on 10 December 2016.
- Archbishop Michael Didi Adgum Mangoria succeeded to this see, 10 December 2016

=== Auxiliary Bishop ===
- Daniel Marco Kur Adwok (1992-)

=== Other priests of this diocese who became bishop ===
- Michael Didi Adgum Mangoria, appointed Coadjutor Bishop of El Obeid in 2010; later returned here as Coadjutor

== Province ==
Its ecclesiastical province comprises the Metropolitan's own archdiocese and one remaining suffragan see:

- Roman Catholic Diocese of El Obeid

== See also ==
- Roman Catholicism in Sudan
