= Our Lady Queen of Africa Cathedral, El Obeid =

Coordinates: 13.1808°N 30.2198°E

Our Lady Queen of Africa Cathedral
- Our Lady Queen of Africa Cathedral
- Location: El Obeid
- Country: Sudan
- Denomination: Roman Catholic Church

Architecture
- Architectural type: church

The Our Lady Queen of Africa Cathedral or Cathedral of El Obeid is a religious building belonging to the Catholic Church, and functions as a cathedral located in the town of El Obeid, capital of North Kordofan, in the heart of the African country of Sudan.

The cathedral follows the Latin Rite or Roman Rite and also is the seat of the bishop of the diocese of El Obeid (Latin: Elobeidensis Dioecesis) that was created on December 12, 1974, by the Bull "Cum in Sudania" of Pope Paul VI. Its construction work was completed in 1871. It was reopened in 1948 during the government of Anglo Egyptian Sudan.

The cathedral was damaged by a missile in May 2023 during the 2023 Sudan conflict.

== See also ==
- Roman Catholicism in Sudan
