= Santa Gemma Galgani a Monte Sacro =

- Church of Saint Gemma Galgani at Monte Sacro
- Chiesa di Santa Gemma Galgani a Monte Sacro
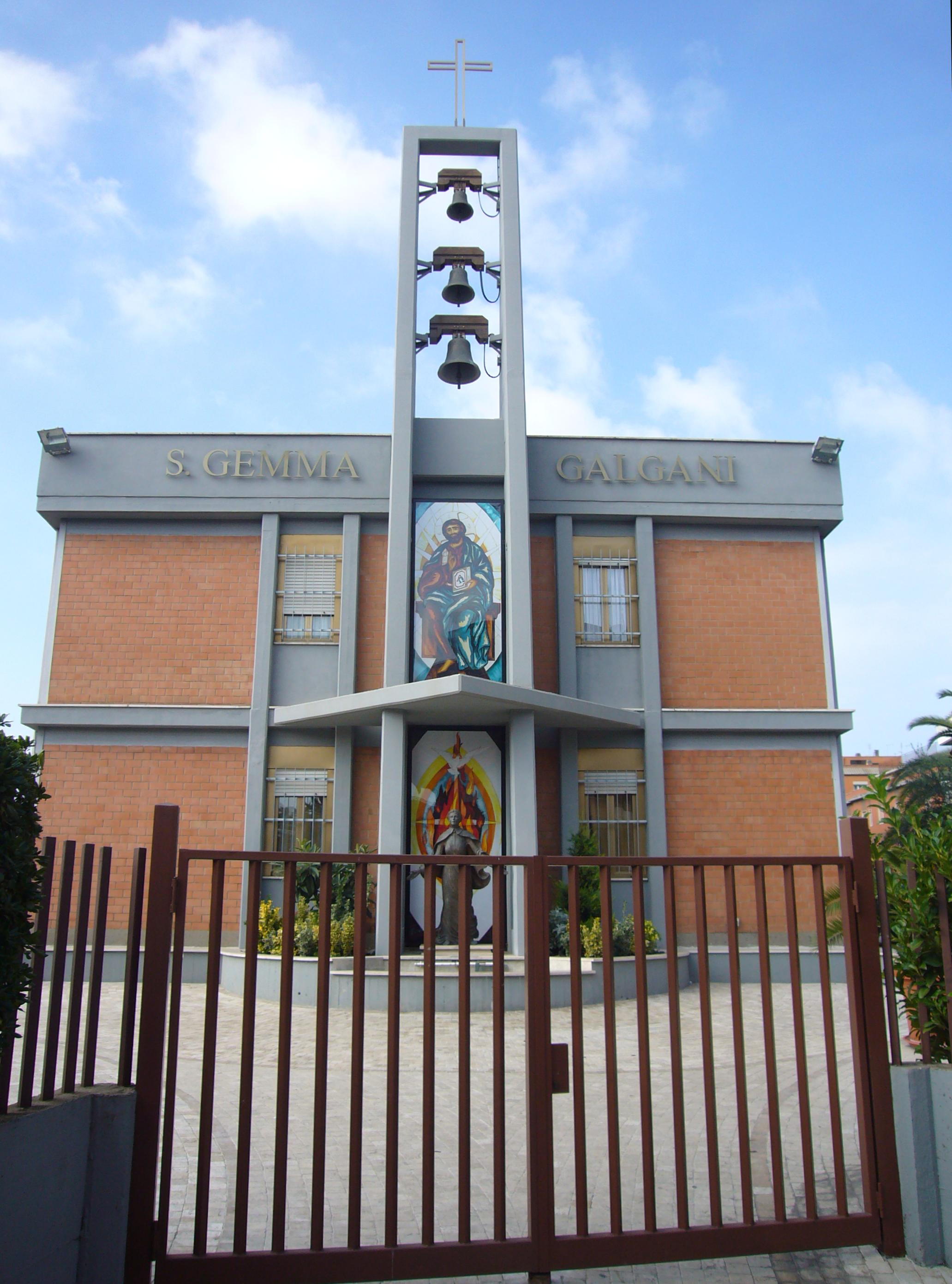

- Location within Rome
- 41°56′40″N 12°32′13″E
- Location: Via Monte Meta 1, Monte Sacro, Rome
- Country: Italy
- Language: Italian
- Denomination: Catholic
- Tradition: Roman Rite
- Website: santagemma.it

History
- Status: titular church, parish church
- Dedication: Gemma Galgani
- Consecrated: 1988

Architecture
- Functional status: active
- Architect: Aldo Aloysi
- Architectural type: Modern
- Years built: 1986
- Groundbreaking: 1988

Administration
- Diocese: Rome

Santa Gemma Galgani a Monte Sacro is a 20th-century parochial church and titular church in northeastern Rome, dedicated to Saint Gemma Galgani (1878–1903).

== History ==
The church was built in the late 1980s and is notable for its outdoor Stations of the Cross. It is constructed of concrete and is square in shape.

On 30 September 2023, Pope Francis made it a titular church to be held by a cardinal-priest.

Cardinal-protectors

- Stephen Ameyu Martin Mulla (2023–present)
