= Sudan/South Sudan Catholic Bishops' Conference =

Assembly of Catholic bishops in Sudan and South Sudan

The Sudan/South Sudan Catholic Bishops' Conference (SSSCBC) consists of all the archbishops and bishops of Sudan and South Sudan.

== Conference history ==
The first meeting of the Ordinaries of Sudan held in Khartoum in late 1929, during the visit of the Apostolic Delegate for East Africa, based in Mombasa, Kenya, Arthur Hinsley.

In the fifties were held periodic meetings of the Ordinaries of Sudan, until in December 1974 was established the local hierarchy and the Sudan was born Episcopal Conference, who in 1976 became known as the Sudan Catholic Bishops' Conference (SCBC).

Following the independence of South Sudan, the bishops' conference was renamed to the current name.

== Sudan Catholic Bishops's Conference ==
Its headquarters is in Khartoum. The statutes were approved by the Holy See in 1989. The SSSCBC is a member of the Association of Member Episcopal Conferences in Eastern Africa (AMECEA) and Symposium of Episcopal Conferences of Africa and Madagascar (SECAM).

== List of presidents ==
1970–1973: Ireneus Wien Dud, Bishop of Wau

1973–1974: Pio Yukwan Deng, Bishop of Malakal

1975–1978: Joseph Abangite Gasi, bishop of Tombura-Yambio

1978–1989: Gabriel Zubeir Wako, Bishop of Wau, and then Coadjutor Archbishop of Khartoum

1989–1993: Paulino Lukudu Loro, Archbishop of Juba

1993–1999: Gabriel Zubeir Wako, Archbishop of Khartoum

1999 – present: Paulino Lukudu Loro, Archbishop of Juba
