= Sidi Medien =

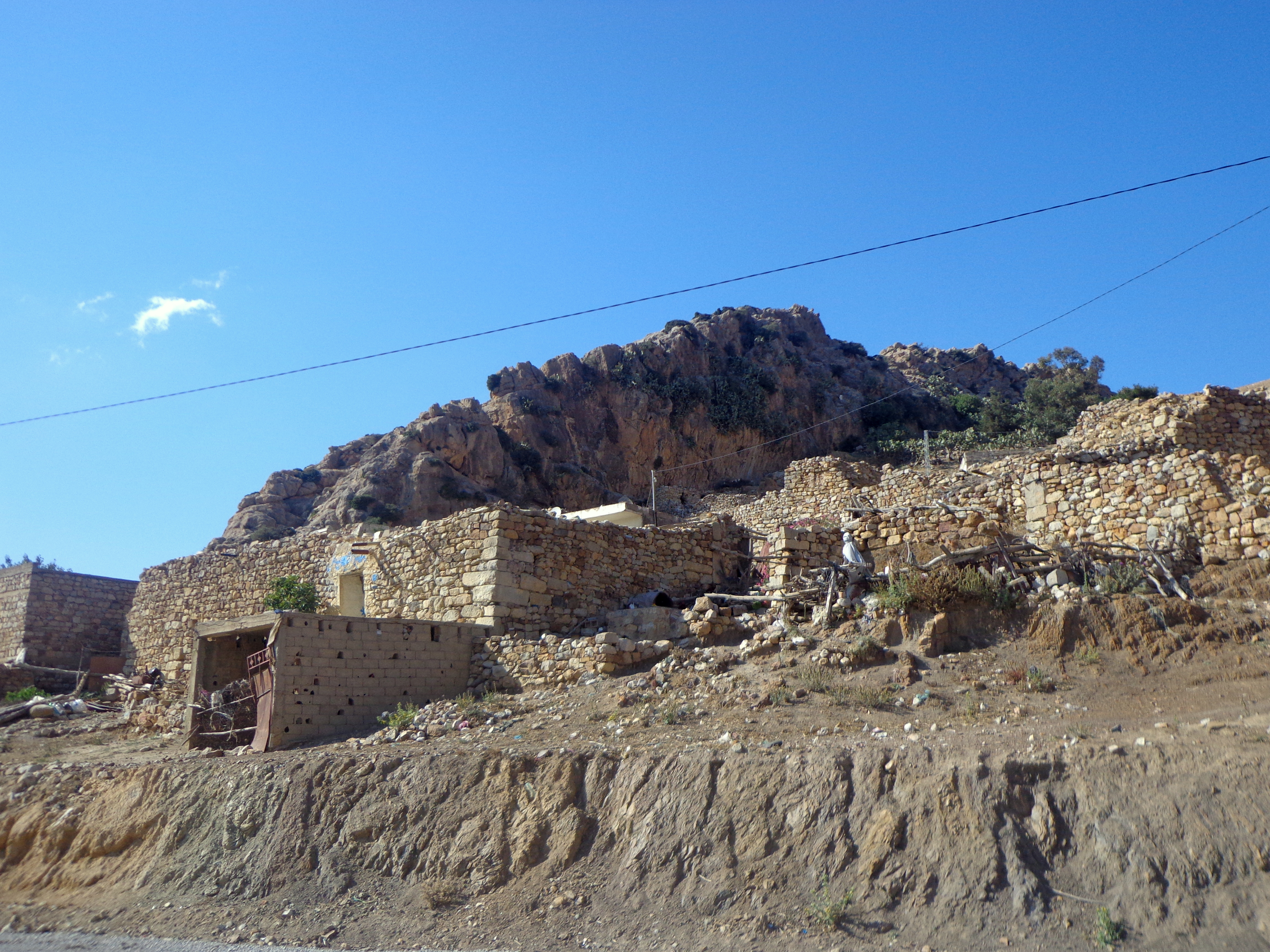
Sidi Medien today.

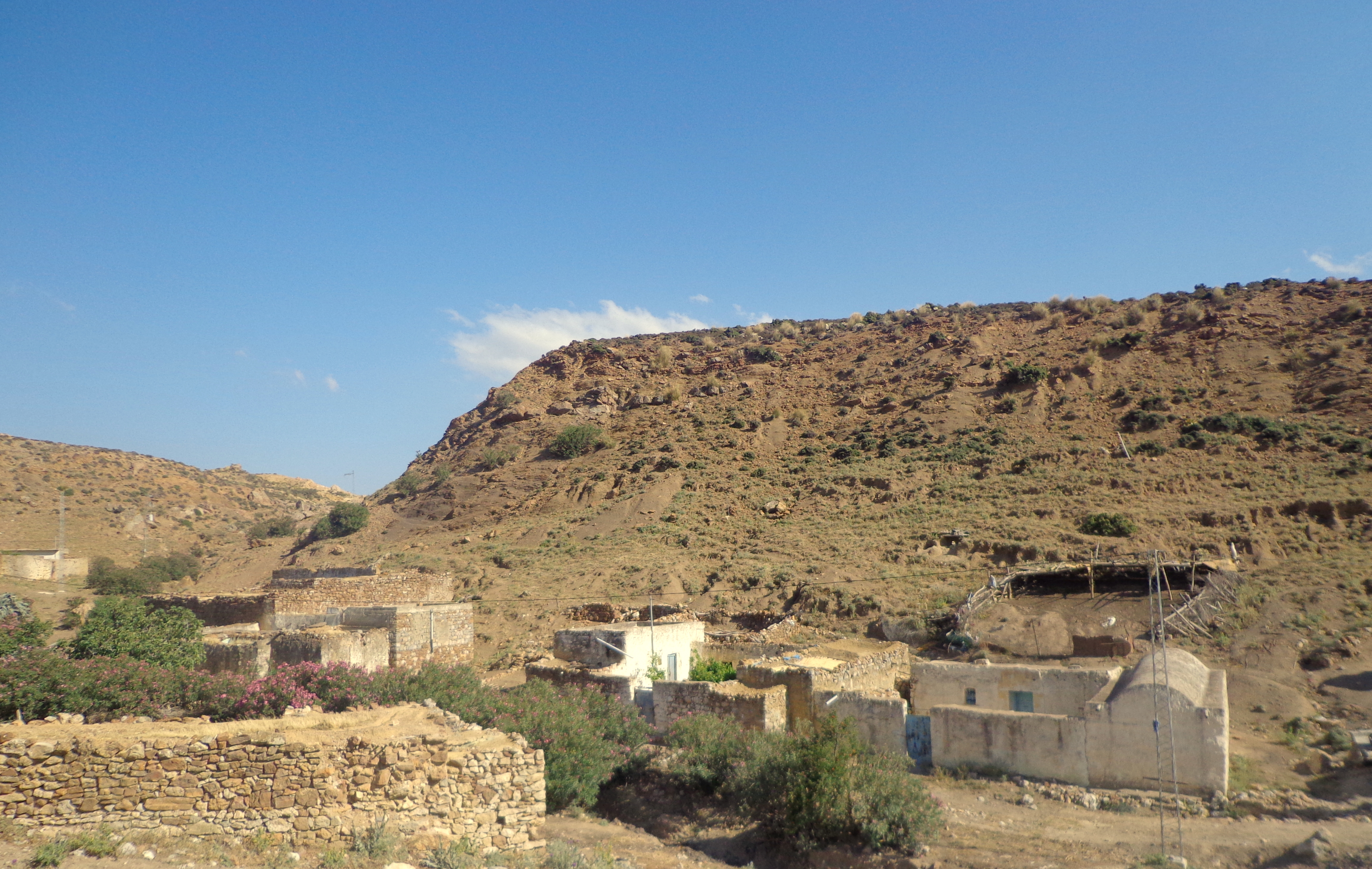
Sidi medien

Sidi Medien is a village in Zaghouan Governorate, Tunisia.

The town formerly known as Vallis under the French is on the A3 motorway from Tunisia, and has a mosque, and the remains of a Roman Theater. A number of Roman Inscriptions can be found near the theater. The Roman era city appears to have been a colonia, by the name of Vallitanus.
