= Annetto Casolani =

Maltese prelate (1815-1866)

His Excellency Annetto Casolani
- Apostolic Vicar of Central Africa; Auxiliary Bishop of Malta
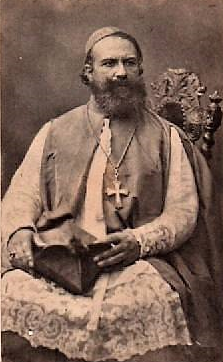
- Church: Roman Catholic
- Appointed: 3 April 1846 (Apostolic Vicar of Central Africa); 3 April 1848 (Auxiliary Bishop of Malta)
- In office: 1846-1847 (Apostolic Vicar of Central Africa); 1848-1866 (Auxiliary Bishop of Malta)
- Other post: Titular Bishop of Mauricastro

Orders
- Consecration: 24 May 1846 by Giacomo Filippo Fransoni
- Rank: Bishop

Personal details
- Born: 10 August 1815 Valletta Malta
- Died: 1 August 1866 (aged 50)
- Buried: St. Paul's Cathedral, Mdina

Annetto Casolani (10 August 1815 - 1 August 1866) was a Maltese prelate who served as the first Apostolic Vicar of Central Africa present day Archdiocese of Khartoum in Sudan.

Casolani was born in Valletta Malta on 10 August 1815. His father was Sir Vincent Casolani who served as a high ranking government official. He started his studies at the University of Malta and continued at the Seminario Romano in Rome where he obtained a Doctorate in Divinity. While still a seminarian, he was appointed a Canon of the Cathedral Chapter of Mdina. He was later promoted to the dignity of Cantor in 1837. After 2 years, he entered the Collegio Urbano for further studies in Theology and Oriental languages.

On 3 April 1846 Casolani was appointed as the first Apostolic Vicar of the newly created Apostolic Vicarate of Central Africa. He was consecrated on 24 May the same year by Cardinal Giacomo Filippo Fransoni with the Titular See of Mauricastro at the College of Propaganda Fide in Rome. The following year Casolani went on a mission to Central Africa, accompanied by some Jesuits. They reached as far as the Nile Valley and tracked to Khartoum, Sudan in 1848. He gathered all the information he could about the Upper Nile with a vision of a new mission, using the Nile as a highway to carry missionary work far into Central Africa.

In 1847 Bishop Francesco Saverio Caruana of Malta died and his Auxiliary Bishop succeeded him. Casolani was appointed as the Auxiliary Bishop of the Diocese of Malta to assist Bishop Publio Maria Sant. While in Malta he took part in politics and in influencing civil law. He died on 1 August 1866, at the age of 51. He was buried in Mdina Cathedral.
