= Antonio Menegazzo =

Italian Roman Catholic bishop (1931–2019)

Antonio Menegazzo (13 September 1931 – 20 March 2019) was an Italian Roman Catholic titular bishop.

== Biography ==
Menegazzo was born in Italy and was ordained to the priesthood in 1956. He served as titular bishop of Mesarfelta and was the apostolic administrator of the Roman Catholic Diocese of El Obeid, Sudan from 1996 until 2010.
