= Vincent Mojwok Nyiker =

South Sudanese Roman Catholic bishop (1933–2018)

- Bishop of Malakal
- Church: Catholic Church
- Diocese: Diocese of Malakal
- In office: 15 March 1979 – 16 May 2009
- Predecessor: Pio Yukwan Deng
- Successor: Stephen Nyodho Ador Majwok

Orders
- Ordination: 21 July 1963
- Consecration: 27 May 1979 by Pope John Paul II

Personal details
- Born: 25 January 1933 Atiggu-Tonga (west of Malakal), Anglo-Egyptian Sudan, British Empire
- Died: 5 January 2018 (aged 84) Khartoum, Sudan

Vincent Mojwok Nyiker (25 January 1933 – 5 January 2018) was a Roman Catholic bishop.

Mojwok Nyiker was born in the Sudan and was ordained to the priesthood in 1962. He served as the bishop of the Roman Catholic Diocese of Malakal, South Sudan from 1979 to 2009.

He died in Khartoum in 2018.
