= Vallitanus =

Ancient Tunisian colonia

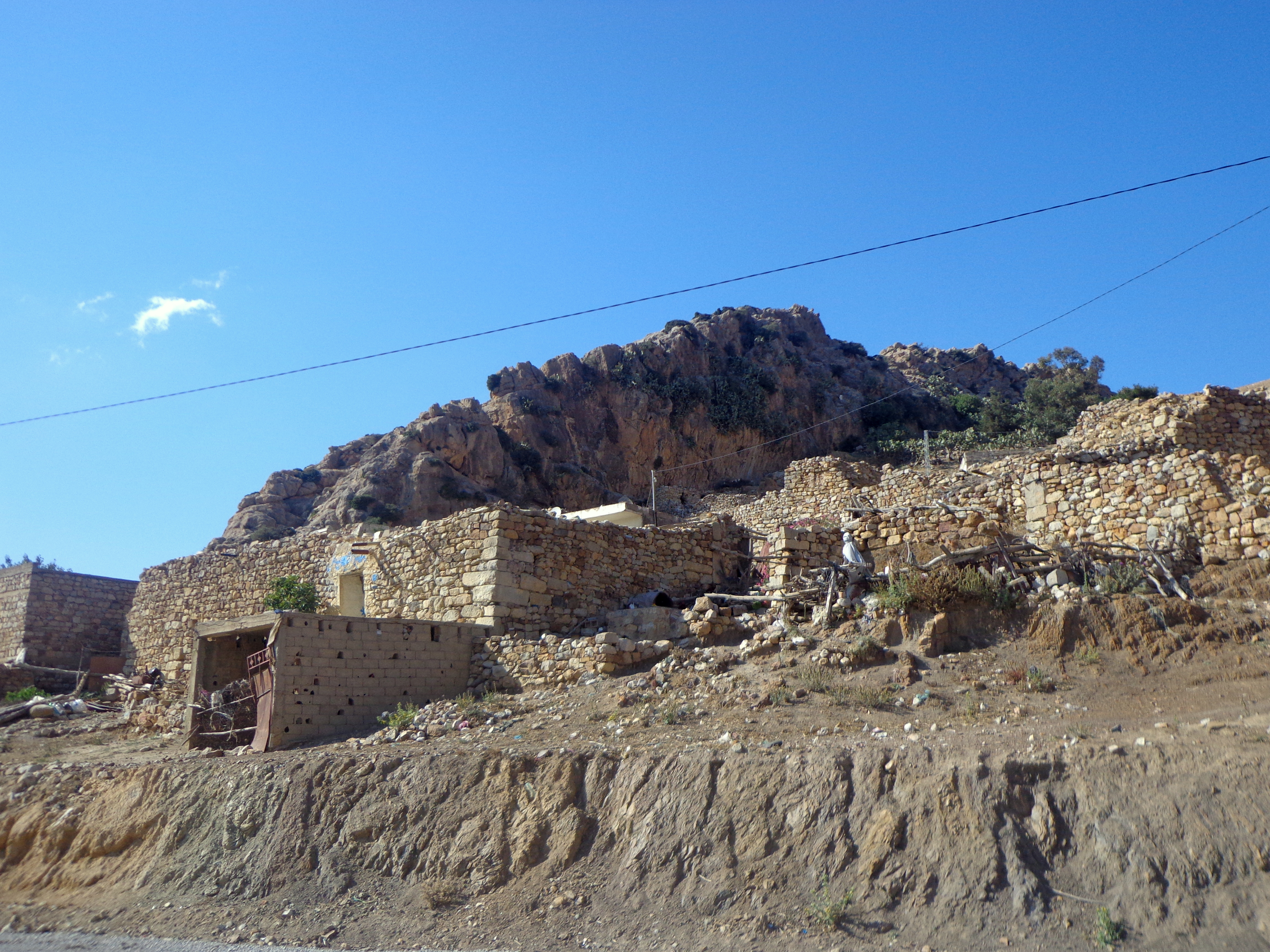
Sidi Medien today

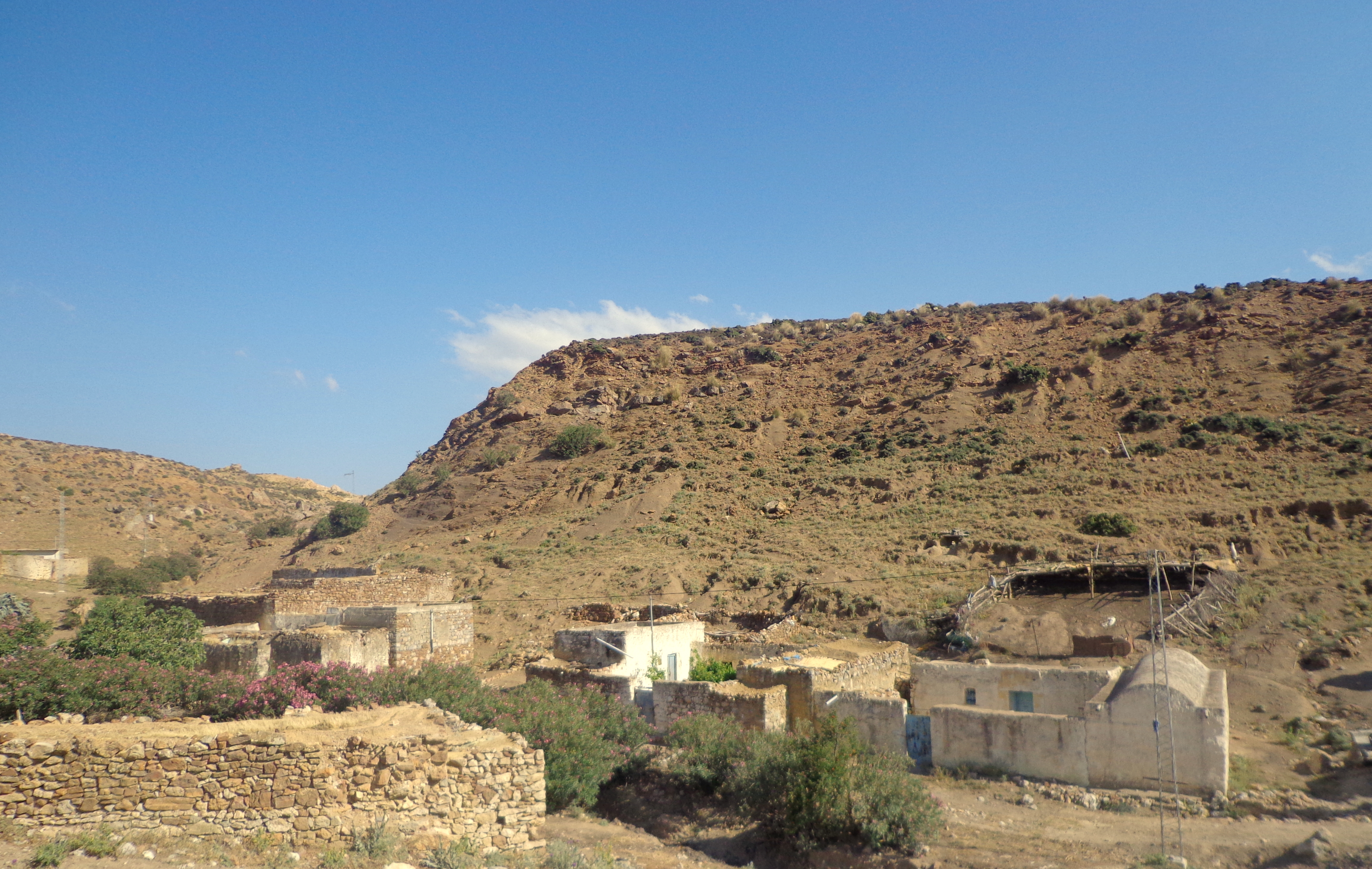
Sidi Medien

Vallitanus or Vallis was an ancient Roman–Berber colonia in Carthage, Tunisia. The town is identified with ruins at Sidi Medien, where are located the remains of a Roman theatre, and a number of Roman inscriptions bearing witness to the town's name, and some local officials of the time can be found near the theatre.

Roman Vallitanus was also the seat of an ancient bishopric under the metropolitan of Cartagine. Four bishops from antiquity are known.

- Bonifatius (Donatist bishop fl.314)
- Restitutus (Donatist bishop floruit 404)
- Bonifatius (Catholic bishop fl. 411)
- Restitutus (Catholic bishop fl.525)

The bishopric ceased to function in the early 8th century with the arrival of Islam. Since the 1920s the diocese has been reestablished in name as a titular see and bishops have been appointed since. The current bishop of Vallitanus is José Rafael Palma Capetillo, who replaced Jean-Michel di Falco Léandri.
