= El Obeid =

City in North Kordofan, Sudan

El Obeid الأبيض
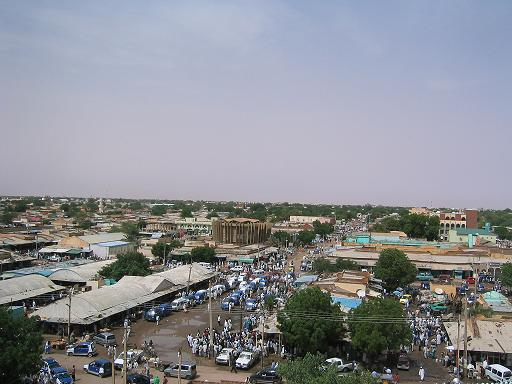
- El Obeid in 2006

- Location in Sudan
- Coordinates: 13°11′N 30°13′E
- Country: Sudan
- State: North Kordofan
- Locality: Sheikan
- Elevation: 609 m (1,998 ft)

Population (2025)
  - Total: 579,571
- Time zone: GMT + 3

El Obeid (Arabic: الأُبَيِّض, romanized: al-ʔubayyiḍ, lit. 'the white'), also romanized as Al-Ubayyid, is the capital of the state of North Kordofan, in Sudan. It is located within the Sheikan locality and under the former administrative structure within Sheikan District. El Obeid is an important commercial and transport centre linking western Sudan with the eastern parts of the country. The city is known for its trade in gum arabic, millet, oilseeds and livestock, and has a railway terminus, major roads and El Obeid Airport.

El Obeid prospered as a caravan stop under the Musaba’at Kingdom before the Egyptians founded the modern city in 1821. It was destroyed and abandoned during the Mahdist period, then rebuilt after Anglo-Egyptian forces took control in 1899. Its growth accelerated following the construction of a railway to Khartoum and Port Sudan between 1909 and 1912.

Since the outbreak of the Sudanese civil war in April 2023, El Obeid has been repeatedly besieged and attacked by the Rapid Support Forces. The conflict has caused shortages of essential goods, civilian casualties and large-scale displacement. As of July 2026, an estimated 563,000 residents and 105,000 internally displaced persons were living in the city.

== History ==
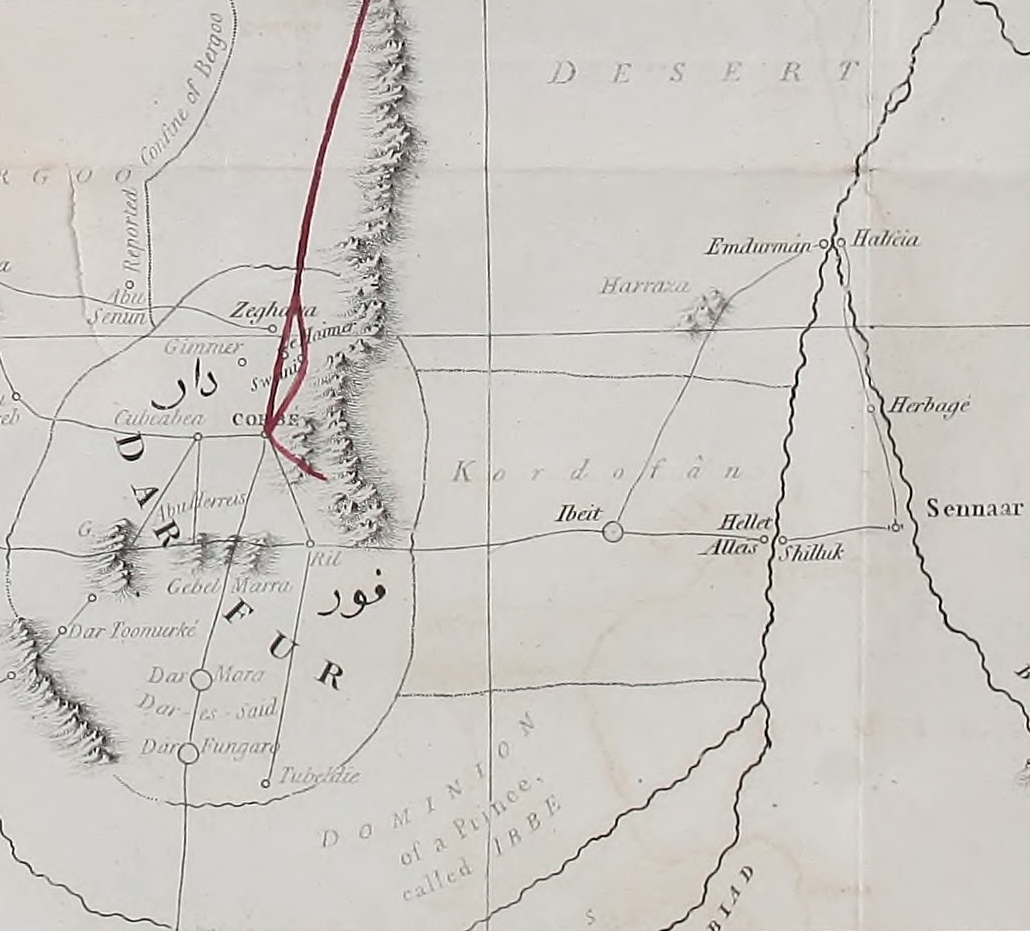
Map by William George Browne showing El Obeid ("Ibeit") as intermediary station between the Nile and the Darfur Sultanate, 1799.

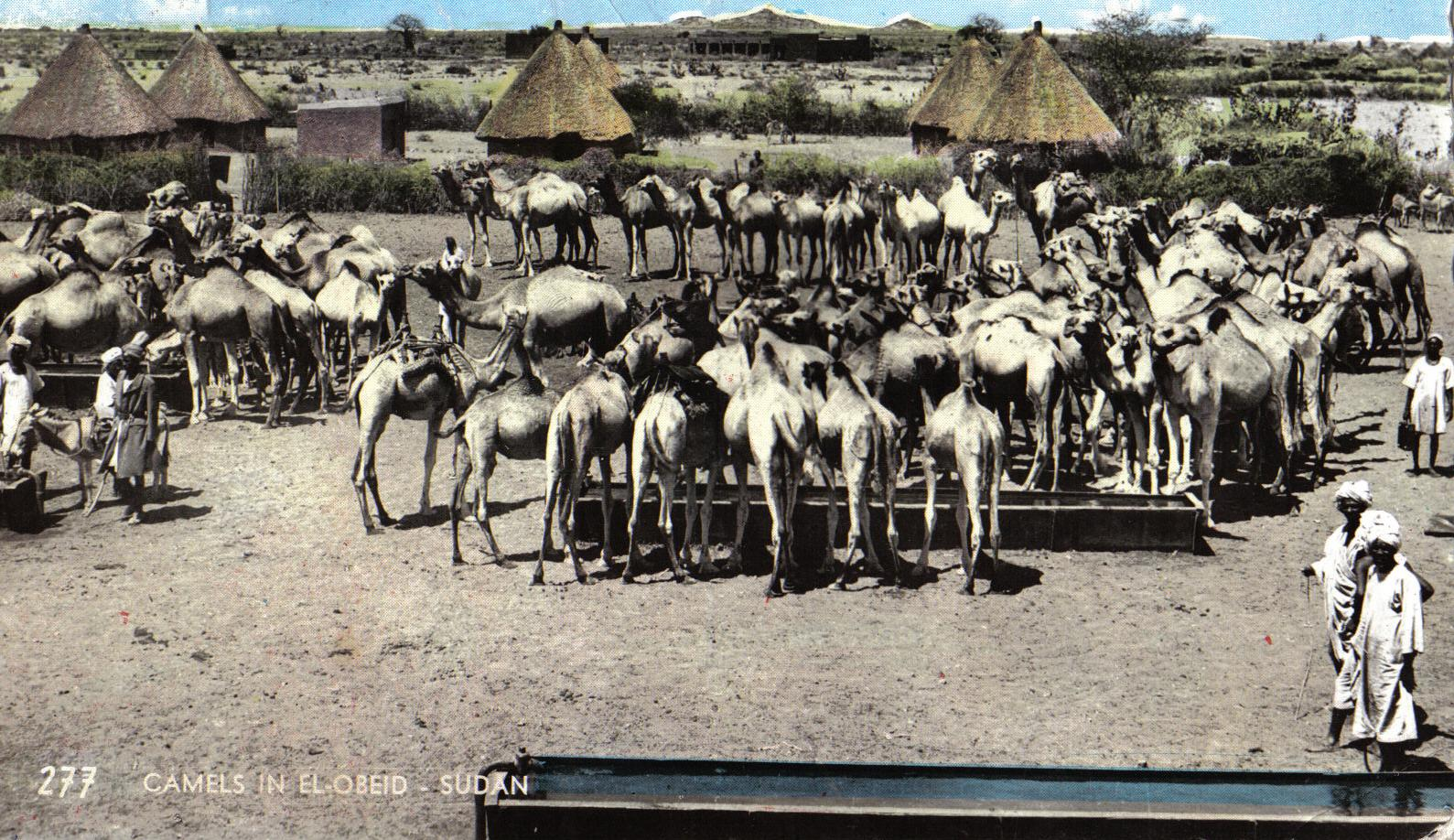
Camels in El Obeid

El Obeid, known as the 'bride of the sands', prospered under the Musaba’at Kingdom in the fifteenth and sixteenth centuries, when it was an important stop for trade caravans connecting western Sudan with the country's central and northern regions. The modern city of El Obeid was founded in 1821 by the Egyptians.

From the 1840s, El Obeid became one of the markets for enslaved people taken during raids in southern Sudan by the Egyptian army and jallaba (small-scale traders from northern Sudan). Children and young women were particularly sought for domestic labour and as slave-wives.

In the late nineteenth century, El Obeid was spread over a wide area and consisted of several separate townships inhabited by different groups. Most houses were mud huts that needed rebuilding or major repairs after the rainy season. The town also contained the governor's residence, barracks, a gunpowder magazine, a hospital and six mosques. Water was often scarce despite deep wells, and local crafts included palm-leaf plaiting and silver filigree. El Obeid also had a substantial trade in gum, gold and ivory with Darfur and neighbouring regions.

In September 1882, Mahdist forces attacked the town. After the assault was repelled, they besieged it, and El Obeid surrendered on 17 January 1883. During the Mahdist period, the city was destroyed and abandoned. When Kordofan came under Anglo-Egyptian control in 1899, little remained of El Obeid apart from part of the former government offices. A new town was planned on a grid, the mudiria (provincial government offices) was restored, and barracks were constructed.

In the early twentieth century, El Obeid was the seat of the provincial administration and the headquarters of the Camel Corps. Its population varied considerably, from about 11,500 to 40,000 inhabitants, depending on seasonal movements connected with herding, agriculture and trade. Despite its administrative role, the town's infrastructure remained limited, with poor government buildings, sanitation and water systems. In 1912, the hospital still consisted of a temporary building made up of three tukuls (round huts), although it handled about 300 admissions and 3,000 outpatient visits each year.

Built between 1909 and 1912, the railway linking El Obeid with Khartoum and Port Sudan greatly stimulated the city's development. Trade was diverted from other centres on the White Nile, including Kosti and El Dueim, and some traders relocated to El Obeid.

In 1996, an oil refinery was established.

=== War in Darfur ===
Throughout the war in Darfur, El Obeid experienced less violence than its southern and western counterparts. The city was primarily a hub for international aid to Darfur and South Sudan in the early 2010s. El Obeid was also the center of several peace talks between the Bashir regime and SPLM-N rebels (after their split between Malik Agar and Abdelaziz al-Hilu in 2017). In 2019, during the Sudanese revolution, six protesters, including four children, were killed in a massacre by the Rapid Support Forces that drew strong condemnation from international and Sudanese media. From 2021 to 2023, the city saw major protests over drinking water shortages.

=== Sudanese civil war ===
==== Siege and attacks ====
Since April 2023, Sudan has been in a civil war between the internationally recognized government of Sudan controlled by the Sudanese Armed Forces (SAF) and the rival Government of Peace and Unity led by the Rapid Support Forces (RSF) paramilitary group. El Obeid came under RSF siege that same month. Although the army said it had broken the siege in February 2025, the respite was short-lived. By mid-2026, UN officials said civilians in and around El Obeid had been living under siege-like conditions for 18 months, with renewed RSF encirclement, drone and artillery attacks. Drone strikes frequently hit populated areas, killing and injuring civilians. The prolonged restrictions on the city caused shortages of food, water, fuel, medicine and other essential goods. The second quarter of 2026 was also marked by reports of summary executions, abductions, torture and conflict-related sexual violence.

==== Displaced persons ====
During the Sudanese civil war and the resulting displacement crisis, camps for internally displaced persons (IDPs) were established in El Obeid. One of the two largest camps is the Al Mina Al Bari IDP camp, also known as Unified Camp, located in the northeast of the city at a site that used to serve as a bus station for El Obeid. As of May 2026, the IDP camp housed around 30,000 displaced persons as of May 2026. At the site, essential services remained inadequate, including nutrition, safe water, sanitation, waste management and healthcare. Limited desludging capacity was a particular concern, while existing learning centres could accommodate only about 2,000 of the 12,000 school-age children.

By July 2026, approximately 105,000 internally displaced persons were living in and around El Obeid, which had about 563,000 residents. A further 700,000 civilians were estimated to live within 30 km of the city centre.

==== Humanitarian crisis ====
In July 2026, Plan International warned that the humanitarian situation in El Obeid was nearing catastrophe. It reported a cholera outbreak in the city amid damaged health and sanitation infrastructure, severe food and clean-water shortages, overcrowded displacement sites and restricted humanitarian access, while children faced heightened risks of disease, hunger, recruitment by armed groups, sexual violence and psychological trauma. UNICEF also reported rising malnutrition in El Obeid and surrounding areas, linking it to higher prices for basic goods and limited access to clean water. It also reported an increase in gender-based violence. At the Al Mina Al Bari IDP camp, the estimated risk of underreported gender-based violence was especially high because of low awareness of available services, the absence of referral options and economic dependency. Recommended interventions included prevention and response services, psychosocial support, stronger referral pathways, livelihood assistance and child protection.

By August 2026, El Obeid had for months been subjected to repeated drone attacks that struck homes, schools, markets and even funerals, leaving residents exposed to violence throughout the city. “In El Obeid, Sudan, drone attacks during the day and sexual violence at night have left no safe window for women and girls to collect water,” said UN Women regional director Anna Mutavati.

== Geography ==
El Obeid is situated 609 meters above sea level. It lies at the foot of the mountain Jebel Kordofan, about 150 miles west of the White Nile.

=== Climate ===
El Obeid has a hot semi-desert climate (Köppen: BSh), bordering upon a hot desert climate (BWh), despite receiving over 400 millimetres or 16 inches of rain, owing to the extremely high potential evapotranspiration. Temperatures are coolest in December and January and are hottest from April to June. A wet season lasts from June to September with moderate rainfall and relatively high humidity. The period from November to April is almost completely dry, with very low humidity.

Climate data for El Obeid (El Obeid Airport) (1991–2020 normals, extremes 1961–2020)
Month	Jan	Feb	Mar	Apr	May	Jun	Jul	Aug	Sep	Oct	Nov	Dec	Year
Record high °C (°F)	40.5 (104.9)	43 (109)	44.5 (112.1)	45.8 (114.4)	45 (113)	43.7 (110.7)	41 (106)	40 (104)	40 (104)	42.3 (108.1)	40 (104)	38 (100)	45.8 (114.4)
Mean daily maximum °C (°F)	30.0 (86.0)	32.7 (90.9)	36.1 (97.0)	39.1 (102.4)	39.3 (102.7)	37.7 (99.9)	34.1 (93.4)	32.3 (90.1)	34.7 (94.5)	36.8 (98.2)	34.0 (93.2)	30.9 (87.6)	34.8 (94.6)
Daily mean °C (°F)	21.8 (71.2)	24.4 (75.9)	27.8 (82.0)	31.0 (87.8)	32.0 (89.6)	31.1 (88.0)	28.6 (83.5)	27.4 (81.3)	28.5 (83.3)	29.7 (85.5)	26.4 (79.5)	22.9 (73.2)	27.6 (81.7)
Mean daily minimum °C (°F)	13.7 (56.7)	16.1 (61.0)	19.6 (67.3)	22.9 (73.2)	24.7 (76.5)	24.5 (76.1)	23.0 (73.4)	22.5 (72.5)	22.3 (72.1)	22.6 (72.7)	18.7 (65.7)	14.9 (58.8)	20.4 (68.7)
Record low °C (°F)	4 (39)	5 (41)	9.7 (49.5)	12.7 (54.9)	16 (61)	16 (61)	11.5 (52.7)	13.7 (56.7)	14.9 (58.8)	12.5 (54.5)	8 (46)	4.7 (40.5)	4 (39)
Average precipitation mm (inches)	0.2 (0.01)	0.0 (0.0)	0.1 (0.00)	4.8 (0.19)	17.2 (0.68)	39.0 (1.54)	122.2 (4.81)	139.9 (5.51)	59.9 (2.36)	17.7 (0.70)	0.2 (0.01)	0.0 (0.0)	401.2 (15.80)
Average precipitation days (≥ 1.0 mm)	0.0	0.0	0.1	0.5	1.9	3.2	8.3	9.9	5.8	2.4	0.1	0.0	32
Average relative humidity (%)	24	19	15	17	28	44	61	70	62	40	25	27	36
Mean monthly sunshine hours	300.7	266.0	272.8	264.0	241.8	228.0	195.3	192.2	225.0	272.8	303.0	310.0	3,071.6
Source: NOAA

== Demographics ==
El Obeid's population grew from about 10,000 in 1905 to 340,940 in 2008. As of July 2026, an estimated 563,000 people and 105,000 internally displaced persons are living in El Obeid. Around 700,000 additional people live within a 30-kilometer radius. The city's population is mainly Arab and Nubian Sudanese.

Population of El Obeid
Year	Type	Population
1973	census	90,073
1983	census	137,582
1993	census	229,425
2008	preliminary census result	345,126

== Religion ==
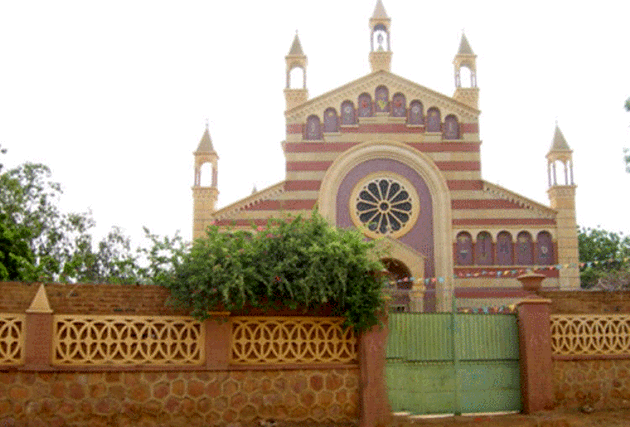
Cathedral of Our Lady Queen of Africa

The population of El Obeid is majority Muslim, with a small Christian presence. The city incorporates a wide range of tribal groups and ethnicities, including many of the Northern riverain tribes, classified as the jallaba, who migrated for trade and to escape the oppression of the Turko-Egyptian authorities of the North.

El Obeid is the seat of a Roman Catholic Diocese, the only one in Sudan apart from Khartoum since the partition in 2011, and of an Anglican Bishopric.

The Catholic Cathedral of Our Lady Queen of Africa in El Obeid is considered to be one of the largest and oldest churches in Sudan. It was founded in 1872 by Daniele Comboni, an Italian Roman Catholic bishop, who worked for the Catholic missions in Sudan between 1858 and his death in Khartoum in 1881. The present building was constructed between 1961 and 1964 in Italian style.

== Economy ==
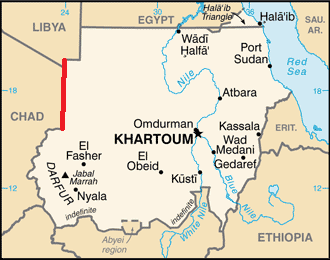
El Obeid's central location

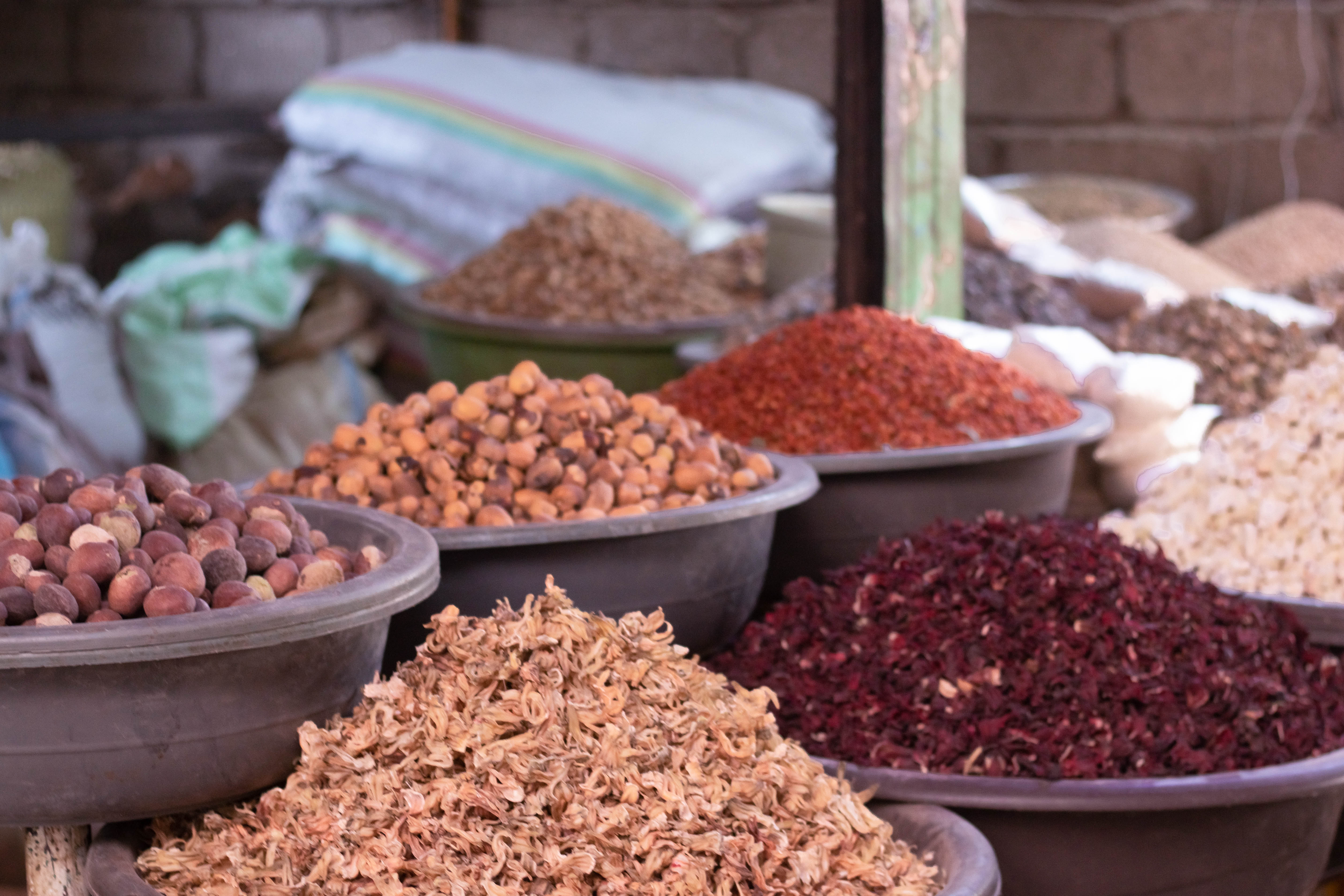
Items at Abu Jaal market

El Obeid is an important trade center, supplying central Sudan and linking trade between the agricultural areas of western Sudan and the industrial centres of the country’s central and northern regions, while also receiving imports arriving from the east. It is known for products such as gum arabic, millet, oilseeds, and livestock. The city also has an oil refinery that, at full capacity, processes 15,000 barrels per day, mainly into heating oil. According to Radio Dabanga, the refinery's office was looted by RSF militias in June 2023.

El Obeid is also a major transportation hub, as the terminus of a rail line, the junction of various national roads and camel caravan routes, and the end of a pilgrim route from Nigeria. The city is considered strategically important because El Obeid Airport is the only airport in North Kordofan, and functions as a center for United Nations missions in the disputed Abyei region.

Due to the repair and paving of asphalt roads and the emergence of several private bus companies, transport became easier between the town and the Sudanese capital Khartoum. The 500 kilometres (310 mi) journey takes about nine hours by tourist coach, and another three hours from El Obeid to Um Kadada in Darfur.

El Obeid is the site of an SAF infantry division and an airbase.

== Education, culture and sport ==
El Obeid is home to the University of Kordofan, one of the largest universities in Sudan, established in 1990. Since 1989, the city also has been home to a French Association (Alliance française) that serves as a Sudanese-French cultural centre in cooperation with the university's French language department. The United Nations Mission in Sudan established its Logistics Base there.

As of 2015, the Sudanese Premier League team Al-Hilal SC (Al-Ubayyid), led by Boushra Adam, plays in El Obeid.

== Notable people ==
- Ismail al-Wali (1793 - 1863), Sufi Sheikh
- Giovanni Losi (1838 - 1882), Italian catholic priest who was superior of the El Obeid mission until 1878.
- Josephine Margaret Bakhita (c. 1869 – 1947), enslaved in El Obeid for part of her life
- Mubarak Shaddad (1915-1980s), mayor of El Obeid
- Mohieldin Salim Ahmed Ibrahim, Minister of Foreign Affairs and International Cooperation of the Sudan
- Yassir Eric (born 1972), Sudanese theologian
- Muna Jabir Adam (born 1987), Sudanese track and field athlete
- Amina Bakhit (born 1990), Sudanese middle-distance runner

== See also ==
- Railway stations in Sudan
