= Gabriel Zubeir Wako =

Sudanese Catholic cardinal (born 1941)

His Eminence Gabriel Zubeir Wako غبريال زبير واكو
- Cardinal; Archbishop Emeritus of Khartoum
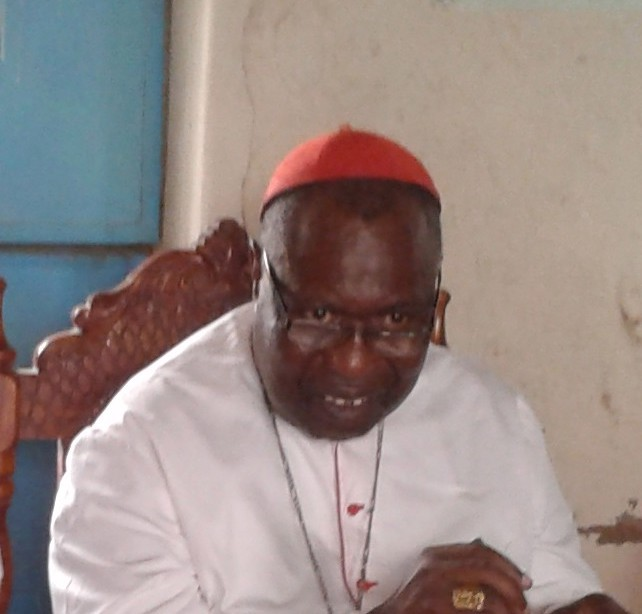
- Gabriel Card. Zubeir Wako
- Church: Roman Catholic Church
- Archdiocese: Khartoum
- See: Khartoum
- Appointed: 30 October 1979
- Installed: 10 October 1981
- Term ended: 10 December 2016
- Predecessor: Agostino Baroni
- Successor: Michael Didi Adgum Mangoria
- Other post: Cardinal-Priest of Sant’Atanasio a Via Tiburtina (2003-Present)
- Previous post: Bishop of Wau (1974 - 1979)

Orders
- Ordination: 21 July 1963 by Ireneus Wien Dud
- Consecration: 6 April 1975 by Agnelo Rossi
- Created cardinal: 21 October 2003 by Pope John Paul II
- Rank: Cardinal-Priest

Personal details
- Born: Gabriel Zubeir Wako; 27 February 1941 (age 85) Mboro, Sudan
- Denomination: Roman Catholic

Styles of Gabriel Zubeir Wako
- Reference style: His Eminence
- Spoken style: Your Eminence
- Informal style: Cardinal
- See: Khartoum

Gabriel Zubeir Wako (born 27 February 1941) is a Sudanese Catholic prelate who served as Archbishop of Khartoum from 1979 to 2016. He was created a cardinal by Pope John Paul II in 2003.

== Biography ==
Born in Mboro, Sudan, he was ordained to the priesthood on 21 July 1963. He was appointed as the Bishop of Wau in 1974, and later as the Archbishop of Khartoum in 1981. Zubeir Wako was named the Cardinal-Priest of Sant'Atanasio a Via Tiburtina by Pope John Paul II in the papal consistory held on 21 October 2003. He was one of the cardinal electors who participated in the 2005 papal conclave that selected Pope Benedict XVI and the 2013 conclave that elected Pope Francis.

Cardinal Zubeir Wako escaped an assassination attempt by a member of the predominantly Muslim Messiria tribe when celebrating Sunday Mass on 10 October 2010. He retired as Archbishop of Khartoum on 10 December 2016 and was succeeded by Coadjutor Archbishop Michael Didi Adgum Mangoria.

== Views and theology ==
=== Family ===
Zubeir Wako made it a pastoral priority for his episcopacy to engage with families, and particularly with children. The cardinal noted that many children were left orphaned due to civil war in the country which leaves them vulnerable and in a poorer state. It was for that reason that the cardinal enabled for the archdiocese to intensify the "programmes for children in education and healthcare".

However, the cardinal also identified problems that face the family that were particularly of a secular nature. Zubeir Wako noted that "practices such as polygamy, adultery and divorce" quickly emerged threatening traditional marriage and family teachings that the cardinal noted that the Church would continue to uphold.

== Sources ==
Catholic Church titles
| Preceded by Ireneus Wien Dud | Bishop of Wau; 12 December 1974 – 30 October 1979 | Succeeded by Joseph Bilal Nyekindi |
| Preceded by Agostino Baroni | Archbishop of Khartoum; 10 October 1981 – 10 December 2016 | Succeeded by Michael Didi Adgum Mangoria |
| Preceded by Alexandru Todea | Cardinal-Priest of Sant'Atanasio a Via Tiburtina; 21 October 2003 – | Incumbent |
