= Paulino Lukudu Loro =

South Sudanese catholic priest (1940–2021)

The Most Reverend Paulino Lukudu Loro F.S.C.J.
- Archbishop Emeritus of Juba
- Church: Roman Catholic Church
- Archdiocese: Juba
- See: Juba
- Appointed: 19 February 1983
- Installed: 31 July 1983
- Term ended: 12 December 2019
- Predecessor: Ireneus Wien Dud
- Successor: Stephen Ameyu Martin Mulla
- Previous posts: Apostolic Administrator of El Obeid (1974-79); Bishop of El Obeid (1979-1983); President of the Sudanese Episcopal Conference (1989-93; 1999-2006)

Orders
- Ordination: 12 April 1970 by Giuseppe Carraro
- Consecration: 27 May 1979 by Pope John Paul II

Personal details
- Born: Paulino Lukudu Loro; 23 August 1940 Kwerijik, Sudan
- Died: 5 April 2021 (aged 80) Nairobi, Kenya

Paulino Lukudu Loro (23 August 1940 – 5 April 2021) was the archbishop of the Roman Catholic Archdiocese of Juba, South Sudan, from 1983 to 2019.

== Biography ==
Paulino Lukudu Loro was born on 23 August 1940 in Kwerijik. He joined the Congregation of the Comboni Missionaries and was ordained to the priesthood in Verona by its bishop Giuseppe Carraro on 12 April 1970. He was later appointed the as the Bishop of El Obeid on 5 March 1979, after five years of service as the Apostolic Administrator of that same diocese. He received his episcopal consecration two months later from Pope John Paul II in Saint Peter's Basilica. He served as the president of the Sudanese Bishops' Conference from 1989 to 1993 before serving in that capacity once more from 1999 to 2006.

Lukudu was appointed archbishop of Juba on 19 February 1983 and served in this office until 12 December 2019. In 2015 for his 75th birthday, according to the customs of the Church, he sent his letter of resignation to the Pope, but Lukudu was asked to continue in the office until new bishops for three of his suffragan dioceses, whose sees have been vacant for many years, have been found.

He died on Easter Monday in 2021 at a hospital in the Kenyan capital of Nairobi at the age of 80. A statement by his successor did not reveal details about the cause of his death.
