= Diocese of Malakal =

Roman Catholic diocese in South Sudan

Coordinates: 9.533333°N 31.65°E

Diocese of Malakal Dioecesis Malakalensis

Location
- Country: South Sudan

Statistics
- Area: 238,000 km^{2} (92,000 sq mi)
- Population: Total; Catholics: 4,000,000; 1,503,000 (37.6%)
- Parishes: 16

Information
- Denomination: Catholicism
- Sui iuris church: Latin Church
- Rite: Roman
- Established: January 10, 1933
- Archdiocese: Archdiocese of Juba
- Cathedral: Saint Joseph, Malakal
- Secular priests: 14

Current leadership
- Bishop: Stephen Nyodho Ador Majwok

Map
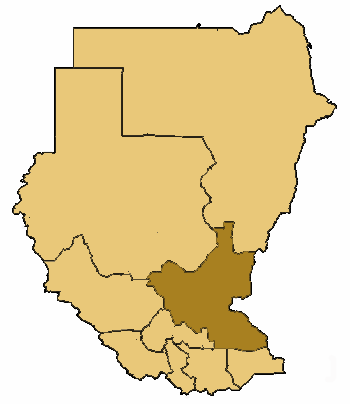
- Location of the Diocese of Malakal within Sudan & South Sudan

Overview over Roman Catholic Dioceses in Sudan (1 & 2) and South Sudan (3 – 9). Number 5 is Malakal.

The Roman Catholic Diocese of Malakal (Latin: Malakalen(sis)) is a diocese in Malakal in the ecclesiastical province of Juba in South Sudan.

== History ==
- January 10, 1933: Established as Mission “sui iuris” of Kodok from Apostolic Vicariate of Khartoum
- August 4, 1938: Promoted as Apostolic Prefecture of Kodok
- July 14, 1949: Renamed as Apostolic Prefecture of Malakal
- December 12, 1974: Promoted as Diocese of Malakal

== Leadership ==
- Ecclesiastical Superior of Kodok (Roman rite)
  - Fr. Matteo Michelon, M.C.C.I. (1933.07.08 – 1935)
- Prefects Apostolic of Kodok (Roman rite)
  - Fr. John Wall, M.H.M. (1938.08.12 – 1945)
  - Fr. John Hart, M.H.M. (1947.06.13 – 1949.07.14 see below)
- Prefects Apostolic of Malakal (Roman rite)
  - Fr. John Hart, M.H.M. (see above 1949.07.14 – 1962)
  - Fr. Herman Gerard Te Riele, M.H.M. (1962.05.29 – 1967)
- Prefects Apostolic of Malakal (Roman rite)
  - Fr. Pio Yukwan Deng (1967.08.19 – 1974.12.12 see below)
- Bishops of Malakal (Roman rite)
  - Bishop Pio Yukwan Deng (see above 1974.12.12 – 1976.12.03)
  - Bishop Vincent Mojwok Nyiker (1979.03.15 – 2009.05.16)
  - Msgr. Roko Taban Mousa (Apostolic Administrator starting 2009)
  - Bishop Stephen Nyodho Ador Majwok (since 23 May 2019)

== See also ==
- Roman Catholicism in South Sudan
- Anglican Diocese of Malakal

== Sources ==
- GCatholic.org
- Diocese of Malakal website
