= Catholic Church in Sudan =

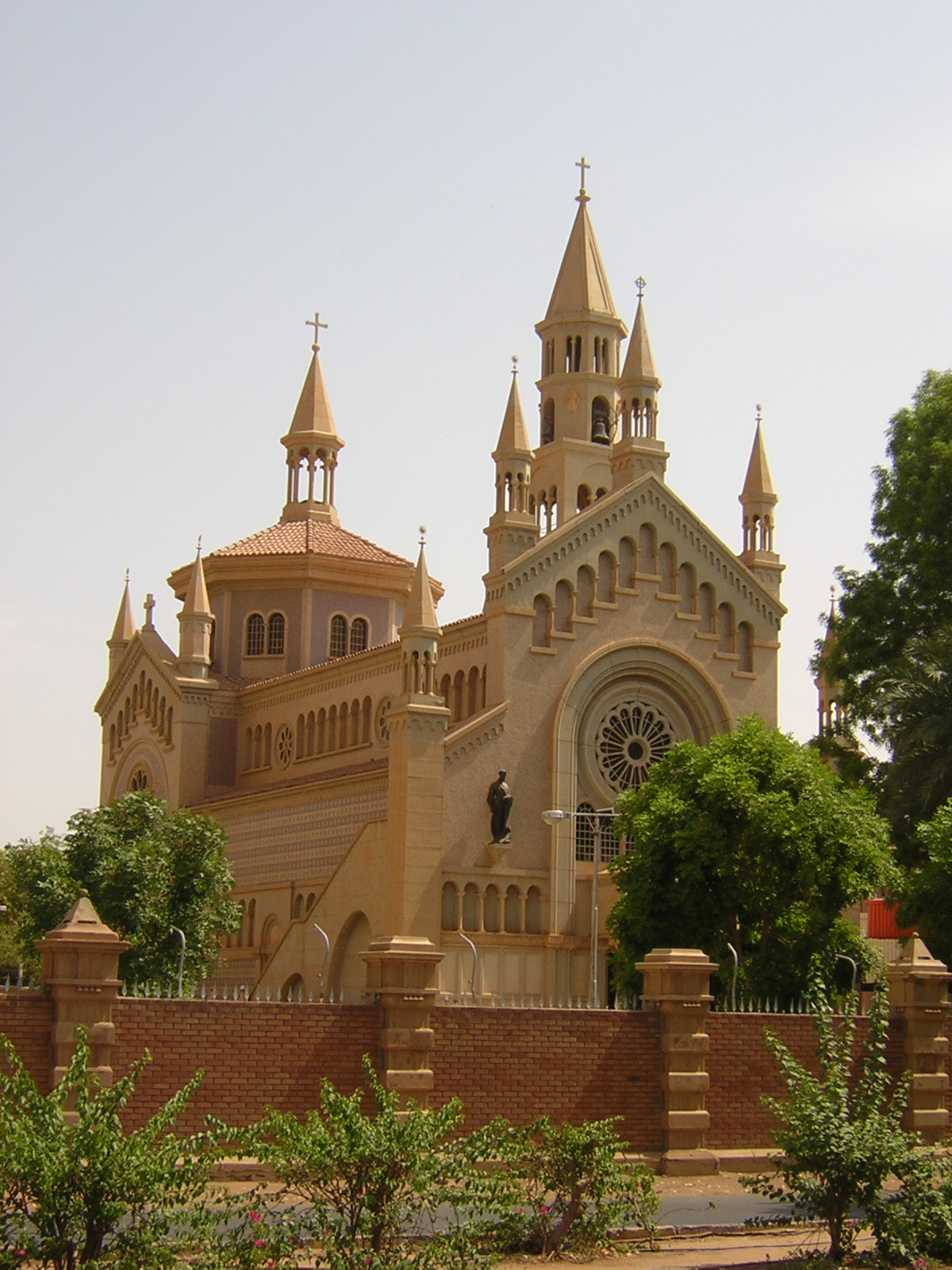
St. Matthew's Catholic Cathedral, Khartoum

Overview over Catholic dioceses in Sudan (1–2) and South Sudan (3–9).: 1. El Obeid; 2. Archdiocese of Khartoum; 3. Wau; 4. Rumbek; 5. Malakal; 6. Tombura–Yambio; 7. Yei; 8. Archdiocese of Juba; 9. Torit

The Catholic Church in Sudan is part of the worldwide Catholic Church, under the spiritual leadership of the Pope in Rome.

In 2020 there were approximately 1.1 million Catholics in Sudan, about 3.2% of the total population. Sudan forms one ecclesiastical province, consisting of one archdiocese and one suffragan diocese.

== Sudanese Civil War ==
The Sudanese civil war, which started in 2023, had a deep effect on the small Catholic community in Sudan. Many foreign Catholics left the country, but some missionaries remained for over a year to minister to the communities they served. One example were the Salesian religious sisters at the Dar Mariam residence, in Shajara, seven kilometres outside of the capital, Khartoum, assisted by Fr Jacob Thelekkadan, a Salesian priest originally from Kerala, in India. The community was in territory controlled by the Sudanese Armed Forces, but surrounded by the Rapid Support Forces. The religious cared for hundreds of residents from Shajara who sought refuge there, according to statements given by Fr Jacob to international charity Aid to the Church in Need. The sisters' house was hit by artillery shells, but no casualties were recorded. A first evacuation attempt was made by a Red Cross convoy in December 2023, but came under fire and had to retreat. In August 2024 the entire community was evacuated safely by the Sudanese Armed Forces.

At the beginning of the Sudanese Civil War El-Obeid remained under thecontrol of the Sudanese Armed Forces, but was surrounded by the Rapid Support Forces, who shelled the city. In an interview with international charity Aid to the Church in Need, bishop Yunan Andali explained that since the Cathedral is located between a military barracks, a police station and a building that belongs to the security forces it was in the hot zone when the war began. He explained that several military sought refuge in the cathedral on the first days of shelling. He also explained that during the war he has continued to offer spiritual and material support to the 300 Catholic families in El-Obeid. The Catholic Church operates six kindergartens, six primary schools and one secondary school in El-Obeid, and these are the only educational institutions that remain open, according to Bishop Tombe, a fact that earned the Church compliments from the authorities.

In June 2025 news emerged of the death of Fr Luka Jomo, a Catholic priest in the city of El Fasher. The priest was killed by a stray fire during an attack by the Rapid Support Forces. The Diocese of El-Obeid, which covers El Fasher, confirmed his death, but said in a statement that it did not believe he had been intentionally targeted.

In September 2025 the Apostolic Nuncio to South Sudan visited many of the Christian communities in Sudan. The 10-day visit began in Port Sudan and was facilitated by the Sudanese Armed Forces. Archbishop Seamus Patrick Horgan also visited the outlying areas of Khartoum, such as Mayo, Haj Yousif, Jabarona and Masalma in Omdurman, where he celebrated several masses, according to pontifical foundation Aid to the Church in Need. The nuncio also visited the cities of Shendi, Omdurman and Atbara before ending his trip back in Port Sudan, where he met with high-level representatives of the Sudanese government as well as leading clerics from other Christian communities.

In May 2026 Fr Diego Dalle Carbonare, who spent many years in Sudan as a missionary, called on Christians everywhere to remember the war in Sudan, saying: "The Catholic Church teaches that we share a common home. Distance should not be an issue. What is happening in Sudan, what is happening in Africa, to civilians, children and women, concerns all of us in some way."

In June 2026 Fr Youhanna Al-Amin, who had remained in the Nuba Mountains with his flock despite the insecurity, was murdered, allegedly for complaining about the theft of medicine.

== See also ==
- List of saints from Africa
- Archdiocese of Khartoum
  - El Obeid
- Religion in Sudan
- Christianity in Sudan
- Orthodoxy in Sudan
- Religion in South Sudan

== Sources ==
- GCatholic.org
- Christian Churches in Sudan
