= Mining industry of South Sudan =

Local mining industry

South Sudan oil concessions

South Sudan mineral deposits

South Sudan is one of the African countries known as an important oil producer, whereas, South Sudan also has mineral resources like copper, gold, diamonds, limestone among others. Government is promoting investment particularly in exploration and also developing the mining projects in South Sudan.

The mining industry of South Sudan started operating from the time South Sudan became a regional government of Sudan in 2005. Its inheritance was a well developed petroleum industry with an extensive network of pipelines passing through Sudan. However, contractual allotments in mining lacked any form of regulatory framework, resulting in the legislative assembly imposing a moratorium on mining licenses in November 2010. With independence in 2011, the petroleum industry was halted. Subsequent to this event, interest in mining non-fuel minerals has emerged and a new Mining Act has come into effect from December 2012.

== History ==
Oil and gas concessions, and pipeline, in Sudan and South Sudan

Oil resources are known in the area of Bentiu while potential reserves have been identified in Jonglei, Warrap, and Lakes. Block 5A is one of the country's oil concessions. After oil production began during the Second Sudanese Civil War, extensive fighting took place there. Other oilfields include Adar, Fula, Palogue, and Unity. The Greater Nile Oil Pipeline begins in the Unity oilfield and extends to the Port Sudan crude oil refinery on the Red Sea.

== Production and impact ==
In 2011, petroleum extraction accounted for 98% of the country's exports and contributed to 60.2% of gross domestic product, but in the following year production declined drastically to about 14%. Other minerals produced consisted of gold and quarry materials for construction such as brick clay.

In the late 1970s, a mineral exploration programme into metallic, radioactive, and industrial minerals took place throughout an area of 25,000 square kilometres in the Juba region of the Eastern Equatoria state. Gold prospecting has been undertaken since 2008 in Luri area under a contract with Gold and Consolidated Minerals and Energy Resource Investment Company Equator Gold, a British company. Gold is extracted by artisanal miners at Nanakanek. Following a dispute with Sudan on additional compensation per barrel as pipe line transit charges, the Government of South Sudan closed down its crude petroleum by the end of January 2012.

Gold, copper, lead, zinc, nickel, marble, and various rare earth metals were discovered but quantification was not done. Prospects for diamonds, gold, chromite, copper, uranium, manganese and iron ore are optimistic.

Oil production was slated for a restart in December 2012 and achieved a production rate of 230,000 barrels per day. According to World Bank's assessment, by 2034 there will be very few resources left to extract.

== Legal framework ==
Due to the lack of a regulatory framework, the government of South Sudan imposed a moratorium on the issue of mining licences in 2010. The Mining Act of 2012 has since come into force and is the "framework for the management of South Sudan’s mining sector with international standards, including licensing, environmental protection guidelines and the use of technology to ensure as much Mineral Resources as possible are recovered from the ground." A drafting Policy Framework for the Minerals and Mining Sector, 2013 was under process of approval by the parliament.

== Bibliography ==
- Rone, Jemera (2003). Sudan, oil, and human rights. Human Rights Watch. p. 8. ISBN 1-56432-291-2.
