= Economy of Sudan =

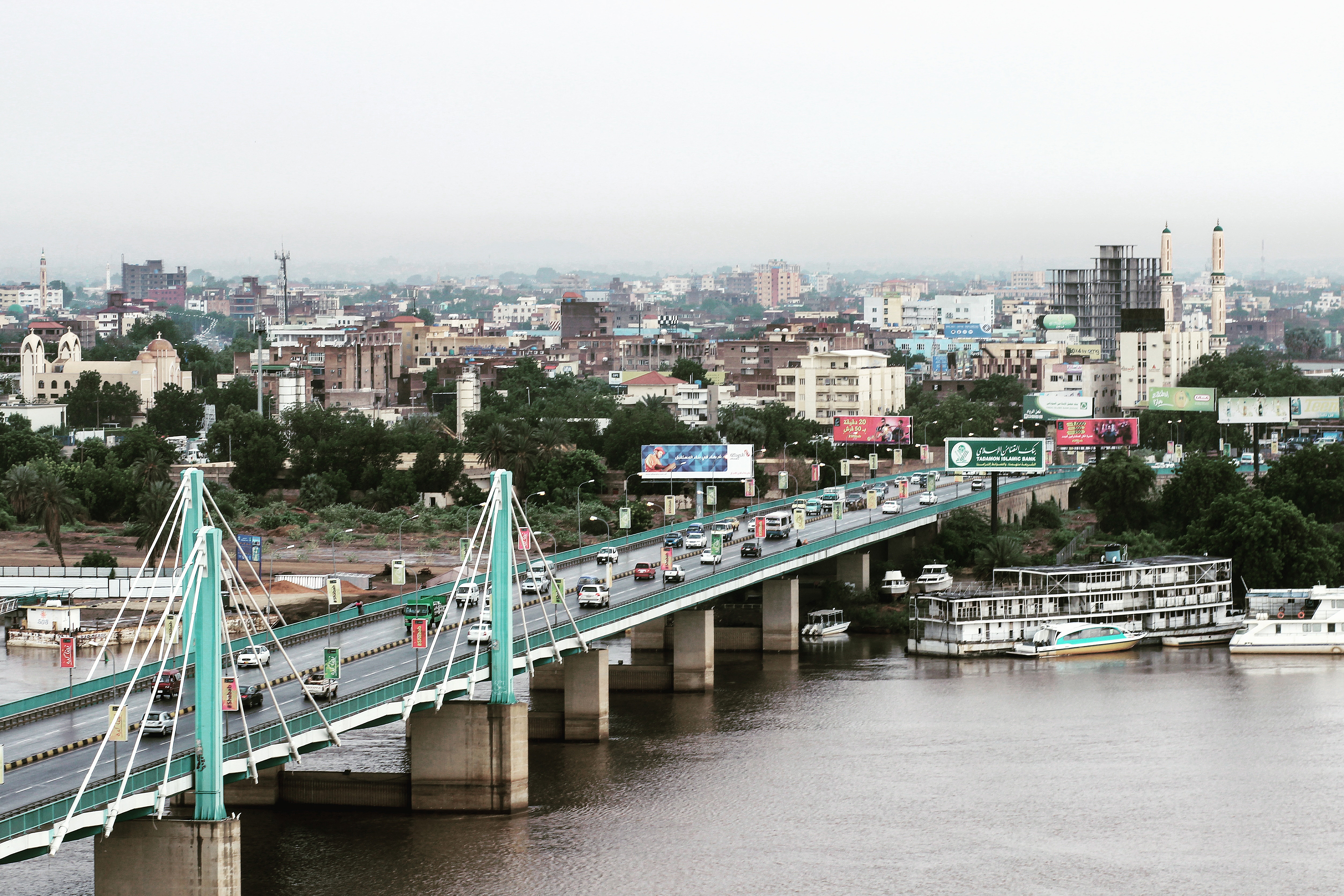
- Capital city Khartoum is the economic centre of Sudan
- Currency: Sudanese pound (SDG)
- Fiscal year: Calendar Year
- Trade organisations: AU, AfCFTA (signed), Arab League, COMESA, WTO
- Country group: Least developed; Low-income economy

Statistics
- Population: ▲48,109,006 (2023)
- GDP: ▲$31.51 Billion (nominal; 2025); ▲$117.77 Billion (PPP; 2025f)
- GDP rank: 111th (nominal; 2025); 98th (PPP; 2025)
- GDP growth: -0.4% (2025f)
- GDP per capita: ▲$624 (nominal; 2025); ▲$2,341 (PPP; 2025)
- GDP per capita rank: 173rd (nominal, 2019); 138th (PPP, 2018)
- GDP per capita growth: -14.7% (2024)
- GDP by sector: agriculture: 39.6%; industry: 2.6%; services: 57.8%; (2017 est.)
- Inflation (CPI): ▼56.39% (2026)
- Population below national poverty line: 46.5% in poverty (2009); 41% on less than $3.20/day (2009)
- Gini coefficient: 35.3 medium (2013)
- Human Development Index: 0.511 low (2023) (176th); 0.332 IHDI (2018)
- Labour force: ▲12,064,673 (2019); 41.1% employment rate (2011)
- Labour force by occupation: agriculture: 80%; industry: 7%; services: 13%; (1998 est.)
- Unemployment: ▲25.0% (2020 est.); ▼19.6% (2017 est.)
- Informal employment: 94.2% (2022)
- Main industries: oil, cotton ginning, textiles, cement, edible oils, sugar, soap distilling, shoes, petroleum refining, pharmaceuticals, armaments, automobile/light truck assembly, and milling.

External
- Exports: ▲$4.1 billion (2017 est.)
- Export goods: gold; oil and petroleum products; cotton, sesame, livestock, peanuts, gum Arabic, sugar
- Main export partners: UAE 21.3%; China 17.3%; Saudi Arabia 15.8%; Malaysia 9.23%; Egypt 7.6%; India 6.98% (2023)
- Imports: ▲$8.22 billion (2017 est.)
- Import goods: foodstuffs, manufactured goods, refinery and transport equipment, medicines, chemicals, textiles, wheat
- Main import partners: China 20.6%; India 19.2%; Egypt 15.7%; UAE 13.8%; Saudi Arabia 6.54% (2023)
- FDI stock: $25.47 billion (31 December 2016 est.); Abroad: NA
- Current account: ▼ −$4.811 billion (2017 est.)
- Gross external debt: ▲$56.05 billion (2017 est.)

Public finance
- Government debt: ▲121.6% of GDP (2017 est.)
- Foreign reserves: ▲$198 million (31 December 2017 est.)
- Budget balance: −10.6% (of GDP) (2017 est.)
- Revenue: 8.48 billion (2017 est.)
- Spending: 13.36 billion (2017 est.)
- All values, unless otherwise stated, are in US dollars.

Sudan has a developing economy largely based on agriculture and oil exports, with additional revenue coming from mining and manufacturing. GDP growth registered more than 10% per year in 2006 and 2007. Sudan had $30.873 billion by gross domestic product (GDP) as of 2019, and has been working with the International Monetary Fund (IMF) to implement macroeconomic reforms, including a managed float of the exchange rate. Sudan began exporting crude oil in the last quarter of 1999.

Agricultural production remains important, because it employs 80% of the work force and contributes a third of the GDP. The War in Darfur, the aftermath of two decades of war in the Second Sudanese Civil War (1983–2005) in the south, the lack of basic infrastructure in large areas, and a reliance by much of the population on subsistence agriculture ensure much of the population will remain at or below the poverty line for years. The problem remains, despite rapid rises in average per capita income. In January 2007, the government introduced a new Sudanese pound, at an initial exchange rate of US$1 = £S.2. Sudan is still a least developed country according to United Nations.

== History ==
Current GDP per capita of Sudan grew 46% in the 1960s, reaching a peak growth of 170% in the 1970s. But this proved unsustainable and growth consequently scaled back to 34% in the 1980s. Finally, it shrank by 26% in the 1990s.

Until the early 1970s, Sudan's agricultural output was mostly dedicated to internal consumption. In 1972, the Sudanese government became more pro-Western, and made plans to export food and cash crops. However, commodity prices declined throughout the 1970s causing economic problems for Sudan. At the same time, debt servicing costs, from the money spent mechanizing agriculture, rose. In 1978, the International Monetary Fund (IMF) negotiated a Structural Adjustment Program with the government. This further promoted the mechanized export agriculture sector. This caused great economic problems for the pastoralists of Sudan.

During the late 1970s and to 1980s, the IMF, World Bank, and key donors worked closely to promote reforms to counter the effect of inefficient economic policies and practices. By 1984, a combination of factors, including drought, inflation, and confused application of Islamic law, reduced donor disbursements and capital flight led to a serious foreign-exchange crisis and increased shortages of imported inputs and commodities. More significantly, the 1989 revolution caused many donors in Europe, the U.S., and Canada to suspend official development assistance, but not humanitarian aid.

However, as Sudan became the world's largest debtor to the World Bank and International Monetary Fund by 1993, its relationship with the international financial institutions soured in the mid-1990s and has yet to be fully rehabilitated. The government fell out of compliance with an IMF standby program and accumulated substantial arrearages on repurchase obligations. A 4-year economic reform plan was announced in 1988 but was not pursued.

An economic reform plan was announced in 1989 and began implementing a 3-year economic restructuring program designed to reduce the public sector deficit, end subsidies, privatize state enterprises, and encourage new foreign and domestic investment. In 1993, the IMF suspended Sudan's voting rights and the World Bank suspended Sudan's right to make withdrawals under effective and fully disbursed loans and credits. Lome Funds and EU agricultural credits, totaling more than one billion euros, also were suspended.

=== During the civil war (2023–present) ===
Since 15 April 2023, there has been an active civil war in Sudan between two rival factions of the country's military government. The UN estimated that economic activity in Sudan fell by more than a third during the first three weeks of the conflict. In July, Sudanese economists estimated the total amount of damage brought by the conflict at $9 billion, or an average of $100 million per day, while the value of property and goods looted was estimated at another $40 billion, with the most affected areas being Khartoum and South Darfur. The exchange rate of the US dollar against the Sudanese pound in the black market rose to SDG730 in September, while it reached SDG625 at the official rate. This later reached SDG1250 in February 2024. The formal economy was described as being in a "near standstill". Gold production was also reduced to just 2 tons from the previous year's output of 18 tons. Sudanese minister for minerals Muhammad Bashir Abu Nammu accused the RSF of looting around 15 tons of silver and 1,273 kilograms of gold from the Sudan Gold Refinery at the start of the conflict.

In February 2024, finance minister Gibril Ibrahim said that the Sudanese economy had contracted by 40 per cent in 2023 due to the fighting, with an additional decline of 28 per cent expected in 2024. He added that state revenues had also decreased by 80 per cent. Sudanese port authorities estimated that international trade had fallen by 23 per cent in 2023. The Sudanese finance ministry was unable to set a national budget for 2023 or 2024 and stopped issuing quarterly reports. It also raised the exchange rate for imports and exports from SDG650 to SDG950. The fighting also rendered more than 60 per cent of Sudan's agricultural land out of service, according to Fikra for Studies and Development.

In May 2024, The Wall Street Journal reported that both the RSF and SAF were using revenue from the sale of gum arabic – a crop primarily grown in Sudan – to finance their operations.

== Sectors ==
=== Agriculture ===
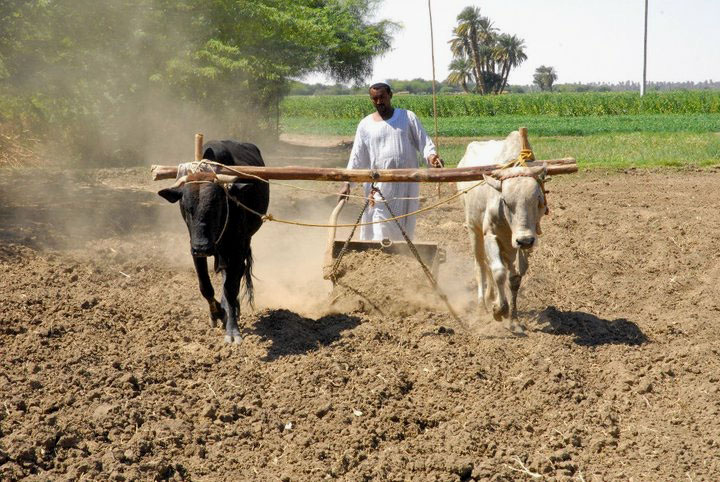
A Sudanese farmer

Primary resources are agricultural, including cotton, peanuts, gum arabic, and sesame seeds. Although the country is trying to diversify its cash crops, cotton and peanuts remain its major agricultural exports. Grain sorghum (dura) is the principal food crop, and wheat is grown for domestic consumption. Sesame seeds and peanuts are cultivated for domestic consumption and increasingly for export.

Three main agricultural sub-sectors are active in Sudan: pastoral livestock, cropping and fish production. Livestock production has vast potential, and many animals, particularly cows, sheep, and camels, are exported to Saudi Arabia and other Arab countries. However, Sudan remains a net importer of food. Problems of investment finance, production and transportation remain the greatest constraints to a more dynamic agricultural economy. A major problem which has been growing for decades is the continual loss of open lands previously used for animal grazing to mechanized drylands and irrigated farming.

Sudan has 84 million hectares of arable land and less than 20% is cultivated. Major agricultural projects such as the Gezera Scheme in Gezira state are underway in order to make Sudan food self-sufficient. Sudan is one of the world's potential breadbaskets and Sudan is nicknamed as the Arab world food basket as it accounts for 45% of arable land in the Arab world. In 1998 there was an estimated 16.9 million ha (42 million acres) of arable land and approximately 1.9 million ha (4.7 million acres) set aside for irrigation, primarily in the north of the country along the banks of the Nile and other rivers.

Cash crops (as of 1999) grown under irrigation in these areas include cotton and cottonseed, which is of primary importance to the economy with 172,000 tons and 131,000 tons produced annually respectively, sesame (220,000 tons), sugarcane (5,950,000 tons), peanuts (980,000 tons), dates (176,000 tons), citrus fruits, yams (136,000 tons), tomatoes (240,000 tons), mangoes, coffee, and tobacco. The main subsistence crops produced in Sudan are sorghum (3,045,000 tons), millet (1,499,000 tons), wheat (168,000 tons), cowpeas, beans, pulses, corn (65,000), and barley. Cotton is the principal export crop and an integral part of the country's economy and Sudan is the world's third largest producer of sesame after India and China.

=== Industry ===
Sudan's rapid industrial development consists of agricultural processing, electronics assembly, plastics manufacturing, furniture, tanning, sugar production, meat processing and various light industries located in any of the 10 Industrial areas in Khartoum. Due to the many countries depending on Sudan for medicines and medical services, Sudan is now concentrating on becoming a hub for the medical industry in East Africa, providing facilities and concessions for medical investments and succeeding in covering about 70% of needs and exporting to many neighboring nations. In recent years, the Giad Industrial Complex in Al Jazirah state introduced the assembly of small autos and trucks, and some heavy military equipment such as armored personnel carriers and the “Bashir” and "Zubair" main battle tanks as well as handguns, light and heavy machine guns and howitzers and, recently, drone production. Sudan is reputed to have great mineral resources, and exploration has started extensively for gold, of which is produced nearly 30 tons annually providing a great boost to the foreign exchange reserves of the nation, with the participation of many investment companies from all over the world. Quantities of asbestos, chromium, mica, kaolin and copper are now exploited commercially, especially for export to China.

=== Petroleum ===
Extensive petroleum exploration first began in Sudan in the mid-1970s. Significant finds were made in the Upper Nile region and commercial quantities of oil began to be exported in October 2000, reducing Sudan's outflow of foreign exchange for imported petroleum products. Today, oil is an important export industry in Sudan. Estimates suggest that oil accounts for between 70% and 90% of Sudan's total exports. The primary importers of Sudanese oil are Japan, China, South Korea, Indonesia, and India.

Most of Sudan's oil reserves are located in the Muglad and Melut rift basins in the south of the country. Oil fields in the south, such as those at Heglig and in the South Sudanese state of Unity, formerly part of Sudanese territory, are linked to the country's refineries via pipelines. The two largest oil pipelines are the Greater Nile Oil Pipeline, which travels 1,600 kilometres from the Unity oil field to Port Sudan on the Red Sea via Khartoum, and the PetroDar pipeline, which extends 1,380 kilometres from the Palogue oil field in the Melut Basin to Port Sudan.

Crude oil from the Muglad Basin is known as "Nile Blend" and is refined at the Khartoum crude oil refinery. In 2006, the China National Petroleum Corporation upgraded the Khartoum refinery, doubling its capacity to 100,000 barrels per day (16,000 m^{3}/d). Oil from the Melud Basin is known as "Dar Blend" and is refined at the Port Sudan Refinery, which has a capacity of 21,700 barrels per day (3,450 m^{3}/d). In 2005, the Sudanese government contracted Petronas to build a new refinery at Port Sudan.

=== Mining ===
The mining industry contributed little to GDP until the discovery of commercially exploitable quantities of petroleum in the late 1970s offered hope that the sector would play an increased role in the economy in the future. Nonhydrocarbon minerals of actual or potential commercial value include gold, chrome, copper, iron ore, manganese, asbestos, gypsum, mica, limestone, marble, uranium, silver, lead, talc, tungsten, zinc, and diamonds.

== Employment ==
The size of Sudan's labor force is difficult to determine because of the various definitions of participation in economic activity and the absence of accurate data from official sources. In rural areas, large numbers of women and girls engage in traditional productive occupations, but many probably are not included in calculations of the active workforce.

More than 7.9 million people were employed in Sudan in 1989, according to an International Labour Organisation (ILO) estimate. In the early 1990s, the employment scene was exacerbated by the 1991 Persian Gulf War, which resulted in the return home of thousands of Sudanese workers who had been based in Kuwait and Iraq, leaving many of their possessions behind. Sudan's support of Iraq was also a factor in the departure of thousands of Sudanese workers from Saudi Arabia. By 2000, the total labor force of Sudan had grown to an estimated 12 million, of which the government counted 9.6 million as actively employed. Approximately 30 percent of the workforce was female.

=== Unemployment ===
Unemployment figures were affected by the severe drought that spread throughout Sudan in the 1980s. In 1983–84, for example, several million people migrated from the worst-hit areas in both Western and Eastern Sudan to Khartoum and other urban areas along the Nile. Many remained in these areas once the drought had eased, living in shantytowns and contributing to unemployment, underemployment, or employment in the informal sector in the cities. In addition, more than 2 million people from the South migrated to the North over the years, as a result of the civil war and famines in these areas. In 2009 the government estimated unemployment at about 20 percent, perhaps not an accurate figure, because a large proportion of Sudanese engaged in small-scale and subsistence agriculture.

=== Labor force by sector ===
Agriculture was formerly the predominant activity in Sudan, although its share of the labor force gradually declined as other sectors of economic activity expanded. In the 1955–56 census, almost 86 percent of those then considered as part of the workforce were involved in agriculture, livestock raising, forestry, fisheries, or hunting. The ILO estimated that by 1998, the figure had declined to 70–80 percent. By 2008 the government claimed that the percentage was significantly lower. The services sector, which included a government workforce that grew about 10 percent a year in the 1970s, emerged as the second largest area of activity, encompassing an estimated 13–22 percent of those economically active in 1998, compared with 4.6 percent in 1955–56. The industry sector, including manufacturing, mining, electric power, and construction, accounted for 7–9 percent during 1998, compared to 5.6 percent in 1955–56. The proportions of the labor force in each of these sectors undoubtedly changed after the estimates were made in 1998, as the relative importance of these sectors altered in the succeeding years. It was difficult to determine the extent of the changes, however, as despite the oil sector's great importance, it did not directly employ many people. Its impact on employment occurred as a result of the increased spending allowed to the government, which created new jobs, often in the public sector.

=== Child labor ===
The minimum working age in the early 2000s was 18 in theory; however, the law was not enforced, and some 27 percent of Sudanese children aged 10 to 14 were estimated to be in the labor force. For example, children as young as 11 or 12 years of age worked in a number of factories outside the capital that produced edible oils. Child labor was widespread in the informal economy, and children traditionally worked on the family farm from a young age. Sudan did not adhere to ILO Convention no. 182, the Worst Forms of Child Labor. The Child Act of 2010, among other laws, governed hours and working conditions of young people, but the law was not effectively enforced, particularly in the informal sector, where enforcement was especially difficult.

=== Forced labor ===
The 1998 constitution prohibited forced and bonded labor, although it did not specifically prohibit trafficking in persons. Nevertheless, there were credible reports that slavery persisted, particularly affecting women and children, and that the seizure and sale of women as domestic servants continued. All sides in the Sudanese conflict also conscripted men and boys forcibly into their fighting forces. In May 1998, the government formed the Committee for the Eradication of the Abduction of Women and Children, which resulted in the identification and release of several hundred abductees, but the government did not police the laws on forced and bonded labor effectively. In November 2001, the government announced the establishment of special civilian tribunals in the border regions separating the South and the North of the country to prosecute persons involved in the abduction, transport, holding, and selling or exchanging of women and children from war zones. Even so, as late as 2010, the Committee surmised that possibly 10,000 or more abductees from groups such as the Misiriyyah and Rizayqat as well as South Sudanese were engaged in some form of forced labor in the border regions.

== Infrastructure ==
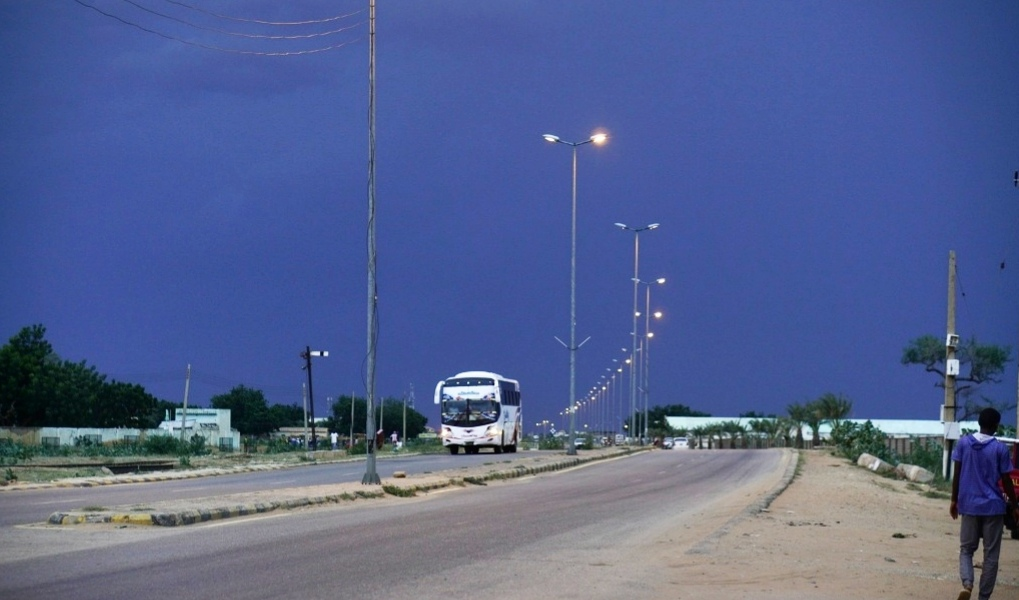
Highway in El Obeid

=== Transport ===
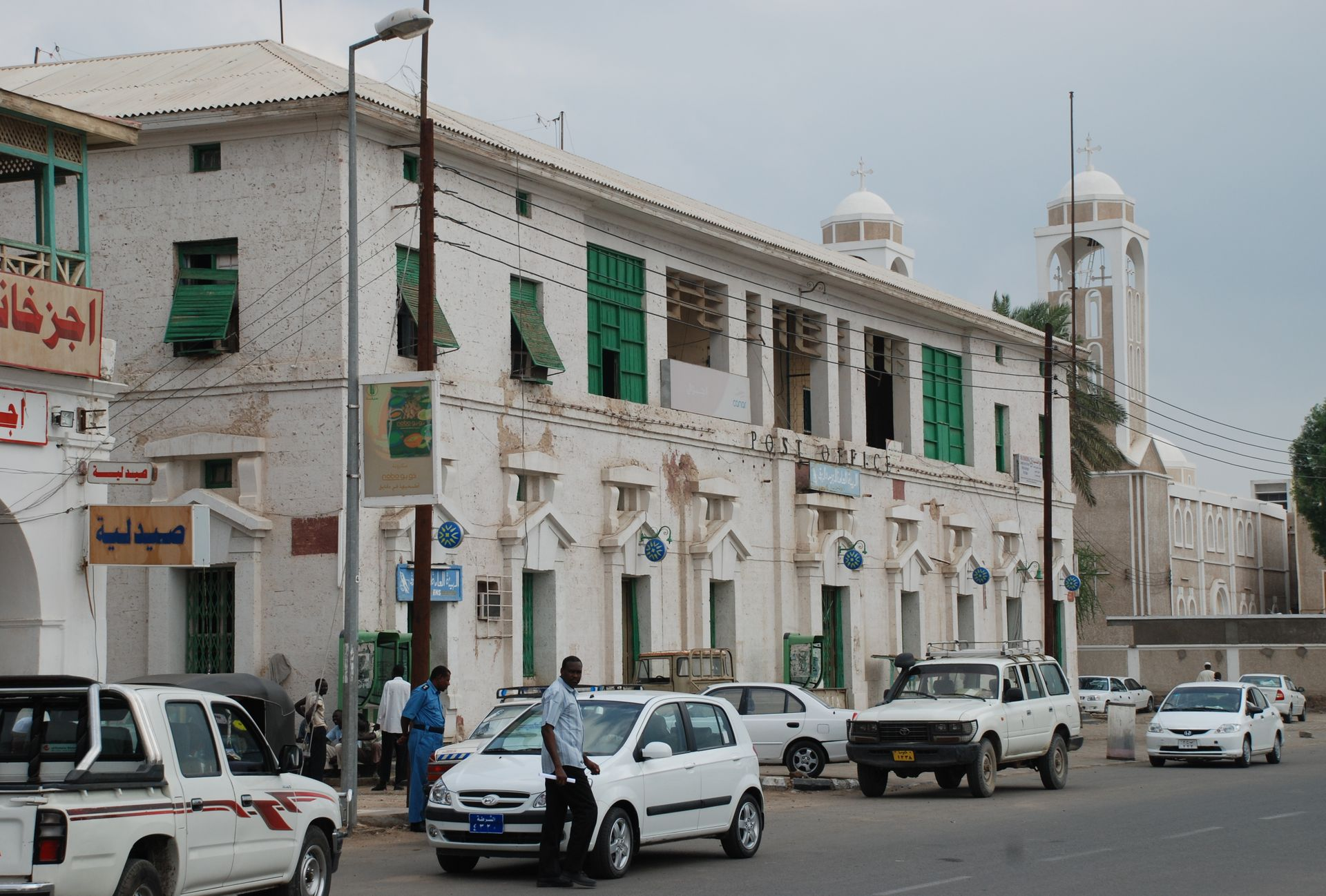
The post office in Port Sudan.

Two trans-African automobile routes pass through Sudan: the Cairo-Cape Town Highway from north to south and the N'Djamena-Djibouti Highway from west to east.

Sudan has 4,725 kilometers of narrow-gauge, single-track railroads that serve the northern and central portions of the country. The main line runs from Wadi Halfa on the Egyptian border to Khartoum and southwest to Al Ubayyid via Sannar and Kusti, with extensions to Nyala in Southern Darfur and Wau in Bahr al Ghazal.

Other lines connect Atbarah and Sannar with Port Sudan, and Sannar with Ad Damazin. A 1,400-kilometer line serves the al Gezira cotton-growing region. A modest effort to upgrade rail transport is currently underway to reverse decades of neglect and declining efficiency. Service on some lines may be interrupted during the rainy season.

=== Energy ===
The chief sources of energy in 2010 were wood and charcoal, hydroelectric power, and oil.

Sudan is seeking to expand its installed capacity of electricity generation of around 300 MW;of which 180 MW is hydroelectric and the rest thermal. European investors, considering the continuing U.S. economic, trade, and financial sanctions regime, are the most likely providers of technology for this purpose.

More than 70% of Sudan's hydropower comes from the Roseires Dam on the Blue Nile grid. Various projects are proposed to expand hydro-power, thermal generation, and other sources of energy, but so far the government has had difficulty arranging sufficient financing. A new dam which is being established in Merowe which has been opened in 2008 and generates 125 MW of electricity.

== Trade, sanctions, and foreign aid ==
On 3 November 1997, the U.S. government imposed a trade embargo against Sudan and a total asset freeze against the Government of Sudan under Executive Order 13067. The U.S. believed the Government of Sudan gave support to international terrorism, destabilized neighboring governments, and permitted human rights violations. A consequence of the embargo is that U.S. corporations cannot invest in the Sudan oil industry, so companies in China, Malaysia and India are the major investors.

Historically, the United States, the United Kingdom, the Netherlands, Italy, Germany, Saudi Arabia, Kuwait, and other Organization of Petroleum Exporting Countries (OPEC) nations traditionally have supplied most of Sudan's economic assistance. Sudan's role as an economic link between Arab and African countries is reflected by the presence in Khartoum of the Arab Bank for African development. The World Bank had been the largest source of development loans.

Since 1 January 2026, cargo shipped to Sudan must be covered by an Advance Cargo Declaration (ACD), an electronic cargo tracking note that the shipper obtains before loading and whose reference number must appear on the bill of lading.

== Macro-economic trend ==
The following table shows the main economic indicators in 1980–2024. Inflation below 5% is in green.

Year	GDP (in bn. US$ PPP)	GDP per capita (in US$ PPP)	GDP (in bn. US$ nominal)	GDP growth (real)	Inflation, CPI	Government debt (Percentage of GDP)
1980	20.6	1,103	9.1	▲2.5%	▲26.5%	n/a
1985	▲27.2	▲1,241	▼5.5	▼−0.6%	▲45.6%	n/a
1990	▲39.6	▲1,538	▼2.2	▲0.8%	▲−0.9%	n/a
1995	▲58.5	▲2,092	▲6.7	▲8.9%	▲68.4%	▲239%
2000	▲86.9	▲2,794	▲13.1	▲8.4%	▲7.1%	▼143%
2005	▲135.1	▲3,828	▲35.2	▲5.6%	▲8.5%	▼75%
2006	▲148.4	▲4,098	▲45.3	▲6.5%	▲7.2%	▼64%
2007	▲161.2	▲4,337	▲59.4	▲5.7%	▲14.8%	▼54%
2008	▲170.6	▲4,475	▲64.8	▲3.8%	▲14.3%	▲56%
2009	▼166.9	▼4,267	▼54.8	▼−2.8%	▲11.3%	▲71%
2010	▲175.4	▲4,371	▲65.7	▲3.9%	▲13.0%	▲75%
2011	▼173.3	▲5,306	▲66.4	▼−3.2%	▲18.1%	▲78%
2012	▼146.5	▼4,180	▼48.9	▼−17.0%	▲35.6%	▲118%
2013	▲151.9	▲4,201	▲52.9	▲2.0%	▲36.5%	▼106%
2014	▲161.8	▲4,338	▲60.7	▲4.7%	▲36.9%	▼84%
2015	▲171.3	▲4,456	▲64.5	▲4.9%	▲16.9%	▲93%
2016	▲181.0	▲4,572	▲64.9	▲4.7%	▲17.8%	▲110%
2017	▲185.7	▼4,553	▼48.9	▲0.8%	▲32.4%	▲150%
2018	▲192.3	▲4,580	▼33.6	▼−2.3%	▲63.3%	▲210%
2019	▼183.6	▼4,248	▼31.5	▼−2.5%	▲51.0%	▲217%
2020	▲197.6	▲4,455	▲35.2	▼−3.6%	▲163.3%	▲278%
2021	▼171.1	▼3,761	▼35.1	▲0.5%	▲359.1%	▼190%
2022	▲178.7	▲3,829	▼33.5	▼−2.5%	▲138.8%	▼187%
2023	▼151.3	▼3,158	▲38.1	▼−18.3%	▲77.2%	▲252%
2024	▼123.5	▼2,513	▼29.8	▼−20.3%	▲200.1%	▲344%

== See also ==
- List of companies based in Sudan
- Foreign trade of Sudan
- Tourism in Sudan
