= Adar oilfield =

Oilfield in South Sudan

- Oil concessions in Sudan & South Sudan as of 2004. Block 3 (Adar) in the east.

- Location within South Sudan
- Country: South Sudan
- Region: Upper Nile State
- Block: 3
- Offshore/onshore: Onshore
- Coordinates: 10.008014°N 32.958759°E
- Operator: PetroDar

Field history
- Discovery: 1981
- Start of development: 1996
- Start of production: 1997

Production
- Producing formations: Yabus Formation

The Adar oilfield, also known as the Adar Yale, Adar Yeil or Adaril field, is an oilfield situated in the Melut in South Sudan estimated to contain about 276 million barrels (43,900,000 m^{3}) of oil. The Chevron Corporation discovered the Adar Yale field in 1981, shortly before the start of the Second Sudanese Civil War (1983–2005). Soon after Chevron had suspended operations in 1984, Sudanese government troops began attacking civilian settlements in the area, burning the houses and driving the people away, and in the late 1990s, Nuer militias from Nasir helped the army in clearing away the people to make way for the roads and infrastructure of the oilfield.

President Omar al-Bashir inaugurated the site in March 1997, and it initially produced just 5,000 barrels (790 m^{3}) a day. Production from this oilfield, which lies close to the borders with Sudan and Ethiopia, has the potential to bring significant economic benefits to the region. However, until recently the focus has been on clearing the population away from the oilfield rather than on a longer term strategy for developing the region. China has provided a large investment in the Adar oilfield and others in South Sudan and Sudan and has made plans to make extensive further investments.

== Background and location ==
Adar is an area southwest of Mabaan, which lies on the White Nile in Upper Nile state, and to the west of Ethiopia. The Khor Adar, which drains the Machar Marshes, flows through the region in a northwest direction to the Nile, which it reaches just above Melut. The Khor Machar swamps lie in a triangle north of the Sobat River and east of the White Nile. When flooded during the wet season, they extend for 6,500 square kilometres (2,500 sq mi). The swamps and marshes are fed by local rainfall and by many small torrents from the Ethiopian foothills, which extend for 200 kilometres (120 mi) along the eastern border, and by spill water from channels of the Sobat.

Discharge from the marshes along the Adar river is low except in years with exceptionally heavy rainfall. Most of the water is lost through evaporation before reaching the Nile. It has been proposed to build a canal from Machar via Adar to the White Nile to increase the volume of water flowing to Northern Sudan and Egypt, which apparently could be done without major environmental impact, but political instability has prevented the project from starting.

The Chevron Corporation discovered the Adar Yale field in 1981, shortly before the start of the Second Sudanese Civil War (1983–2005). Four exploratory wells had flow rates that exceeded 1,500 barrels (240 m^{3}) a day. The oil is held in the Yabus Formation sandstone from the Paleogene age. The field has an area of about 20 square kilometres (7.7 sq mi) but the average pay zone is only 2.9 square kilometres (1.1 sq mi). Initially the field was estimated to hold 168 million barrels (26,700,000 m^{3}), but Seismic data acquired in 2000 pushed that up to 276 million barrels (43,900,000 m^{3}). Also, three small oil pools were discovered south of Adar-Yale with another 129 million barrels (20,500,000 m^{3}). Chevron started to pull out of Sudan in 1984 when three of its employees were killed, finally selling all of its Sudanese interests in 1992.

== Development and production ==
Chevron suspended operations in 1984, and their concession was later divided into smaller units. In 1992 Gulf Petroleum Corporation-Sudan (GPC) was awarded the Melut Basin - Blocks 3 and 7. GPC was owned 60% by Qatar's Gulf Petroleum Corporation, 20% by Sudapet and 20% by a company owned by the National Islamic Front (NIF) financier Mohamed Abdullah Jar al-Nabi. The GPC consortium was reported to have invested US$12m in developing the Adar Yale field. In October 1996 GPC began to drill and reopen Chevron's wells and to build an all-weather road connecting Adar Yale to the garrison town of Melut.

President Omar al-Bashir inaugurated the Adar Yale site in March 1997. At first, production was just 5,000 barrels (790 m^{3}) a day, taken by truck to Melut and then by barge down the Nile to Khartoum for export. Although export volumes were tiny compared to the field's potential, it was the first Sudanese crude to be exported and therefore had symbolic significance. In March 2000 Fosters Resources, a Canadian company, signed an agreement with the government of Sudan to develop the concession that covered most of the Melut Basin, including the Adar Yeil field, in partnership with a consortium of Arab and Sudanese companies. Fosters was forced to withdraw in May 2000 when its financial backing collapsed due to pressure from human rights groups. The U.S. government had been highly critical of Canadian involvement in Sudan oil development and in February 2000 the U.S. Treasury announced that American persons were forbidden to do business with the Greater Nile Petroleum Operating Company (GNPOC) and Sudapet.

Petrodar was incorporated in October 2001 owned 41% by China National Petroleum Company (CNPC) and 40% by Petronas of Malaysia. Petrodar implemented major upgrades to the oil development infrastructure, including 31,000-barrel (4,900 m^{3})/day production facilities at the Adar Yale field, now largely cleared of its original inhabitants. In November 2005 CNCP brought the Petrodar pipeline into operation, linking Blocks 3 and 7 (Adar Yale and Palogue fields) to Port Sudan on the Red Sea. The pipeline has throughput of 150,000 barrels (24,000 m^{3}) per day, and maximum capacity of 500,000 barrels per day (79,000 m^{3}/d). By January 2007 combined output from Blocks 3 and 7 was 165,000 with potential to reach a peak of 200,000 barrels per day (32,000 m^{3}/d) by late 2007. By 2009, the two blocks were producing close to 240,000 barrels per day (38,000 m^{3}/d) of Dar blend. Because this blend of crude oil is heavy and highly acidic, it fetches lower prices than benchmark crudes such as Brent or Minas.

== People ==
Adar is predominantly inhabited by the Mabaan people, who mainly cultivate crops and raise cattle. Many of the Mabaanese use riverine pastures along the east bank of the White Nile, but in dry seasons can usually find alternative pasturage along the Khor Adal and Khor Wol and on the edges of the marshes. The country is well suited to cultivation of crops watered by rain.

Soon after Chevron had closed operations, government troops began attacking civilian settlements in the area, burning the houses and driving the people away. This resulted in many deaths. In the late 1990s, Nuer militias from Nasir helped the army in clearing away the people to make way for the roads and infrastructure of the oilfield. Aid workers were also targeted in attacks, with NGO compounds, farm supply distribution centers and primary health care centers vandalized and destroyed.

One estimate is that 12,000 people were forced to move in 1999-2000 while the all-weather road was being built between Melut, Paloic and Adar. Another source said church leaders reported that government militias burned 48 villages and displaced 55,000 people in the Adar area in 2000. According to International Relief and Development agency (IRD) director Derek Hammond, the areas around Adar contained "Fields of destroyed crops with no evidence of any type of food, a handful of local people scratching around in a swamp for something to eat".

== Security ==
In July 1996 the Government of Sudan attacked Sudan People's Liberation Army (SPLA) positions at Delal Ajak, west of the Nile. Their goal was to secure passage for barge shipments of oil from the Adar-1 field. In November 1996, SPLA leader John Garang gave warning that his forces would attack the Adar Yale oil field. In June 1998 the SPLA captured the town of Ulu, close to the Adar Yale field, and in March 1999 the SPLA 13th battalion defeated a government brigade at the town. With this victory, the Adar Yale oilfield was within range of the SPLA's artillery.

In April 2001 a Russian-made Antonov airplane broke in two after it skidded off the runway at Adaril, apparently due to a sandstorm. The crash killed Sudan's deputy defense minister, Colonel Ibrahim Shamsul-Din, and 13 other high-ranking officers who had been touring the southern military area. 16 people survived the crash. A spokesman for the SPLA denied responsibility for the accident, saying they did not have forces in the area.

The Sudanese Civil War officially ended in January 2005, and the Juba Declaration of 8 January 2006 laid out the basis for unifying rival military forces in South Sudan. Gordon Kong Chuol, Deputy Commander of the South Sudan Defense Forces (SSDF), which had been supported by the Government of Sudan, resisted the merger. His core faction, the "Nasir Peace Force" was based in the village of Ketbek, just north of Nasir, with 75-80 fighters as of August 2006 and perhaps 300 reserve forces in the area. His position on the border with Sudan to the north and near to the functioning Adar Yale oilfield was sensitive. In July 2006, four busloads of SSDF recruits arrived in the area from Khartoum. In August 2006 there were reported to be 300-400 active SSDF militiamen in the Adar area.

China has provided a large investment in the Adar oilfield and others in South Sudan, as well as in oilfields in Sudan, and in the pipeline to Port Sudan. China established a consulate in Juba in September 2008 and upgraded it to an embassy in November 2010. China has made plans to make significant investments in South Sudan. A pipeline to the Kenyan port of Lamu is being discussed which could provide an alternative route if Sudan chooses to close the northern pipeline. It is in China's interest to resolve security problems, and as a major investor and customer of both countries China may have the leverage to achieve this goal.
