= Muglad Basin =

Large rift basin in southern Sudan and South Sudan

Mesozoic rift basins including Muglad develop oblique to East African Rift.

The Muglad Basin is a large rift basin in Northern Africa. The basin is situated within southern Sudan and South Sudan, and it covers an area of approximately 120,000 square kilometres (46,000 sq mi) across the two nations. It contains a number of hydrocarbon accumulations of various sizes, the largest of which are the Heglig and Unity oil fields. During the 1960s and 1970s, Chevron made the first oil discoveries in the basin near the towns of Bentiu, Malakal, and Muglad. Taken together, the Muglad and Melut rift basins account for the majority of Sudan's known oil reserves.

The oil fields of the Muglad Basin are connected to Port Sudan on the Red Sea by the Greater Nile Oil Pipeline, which begins at the Unity oil field. Oil extracted in Muglad is known as "Nile Blend" crude. It is refined at Khartoum for export and domestic consumption. Further oil exploration in the Muglad Basin commenced in February 2008.

== See also ==
- Economy of Sudan
- Greater Nile Oil Pipeline – Oil pipelime in South Sudan and Sudan
- Melut Basin – Rift basin in South Sudan
