= Giad Auto =

Automobile manufacturer

- Industry: Automotive
- Founded: 1997
- Headquarters: Khartoum, Sudan
- Products: Automobiles; Motorcycles; Trucks; Buses; Agricultural equipments compressors paints

Giad Auto, in complete form Giad Automotive Industry Co., Ltd., Is an automobile manufacturer headquartered in Khartoum in Sudan. Founded in March 1997, Giad Auto is a joint venture of the SMT Engineering Co., Ltd. arms companies with the state Military Industry Corporation and operates as a holding company for seven subsidiaries. The production facilities of the company are located 50 kilometers south of the state capital in the newly built industrial city of Giad. The plant has an area of 15 square kilometers. The company started work on 26 October 2000. A source confirms that the company produces trucks under license from Renault and MAN, and passenger cars from Hyundai.

== Giad Motors Co. Ltd. ==
With the establishment of the holding company, Giad Vehicles began production and has since built the Hyundai Accent and the Hyundai Sonata. Later came Mercedes-Benz and Youjin brand buses. One of the most popular models of the manufacturer in the Sudan is the Giad Pickup. Some of the vehicles are used as so-called CKD - Assemblies of the Chinese Zhengzhou Nissan Automobile Company delivered.

Giad also imports and markets Iranian and Turkish motorcycles brands, as well as the Chinese brands Eugin & Modan.

For Renault models are the Renault Symbol, the Renault Megane, Renault Fluence and Renault Scala. In contrast, the commercial vehicle range is only the Renault Kerax offered as a truck. Previous models of the work, however, are the Renault 19 and the Renault Clio in the sedan. Only for export are the Renault Scénic and the current version of the Renault Mégane, which is mainly marketed in Egypt.

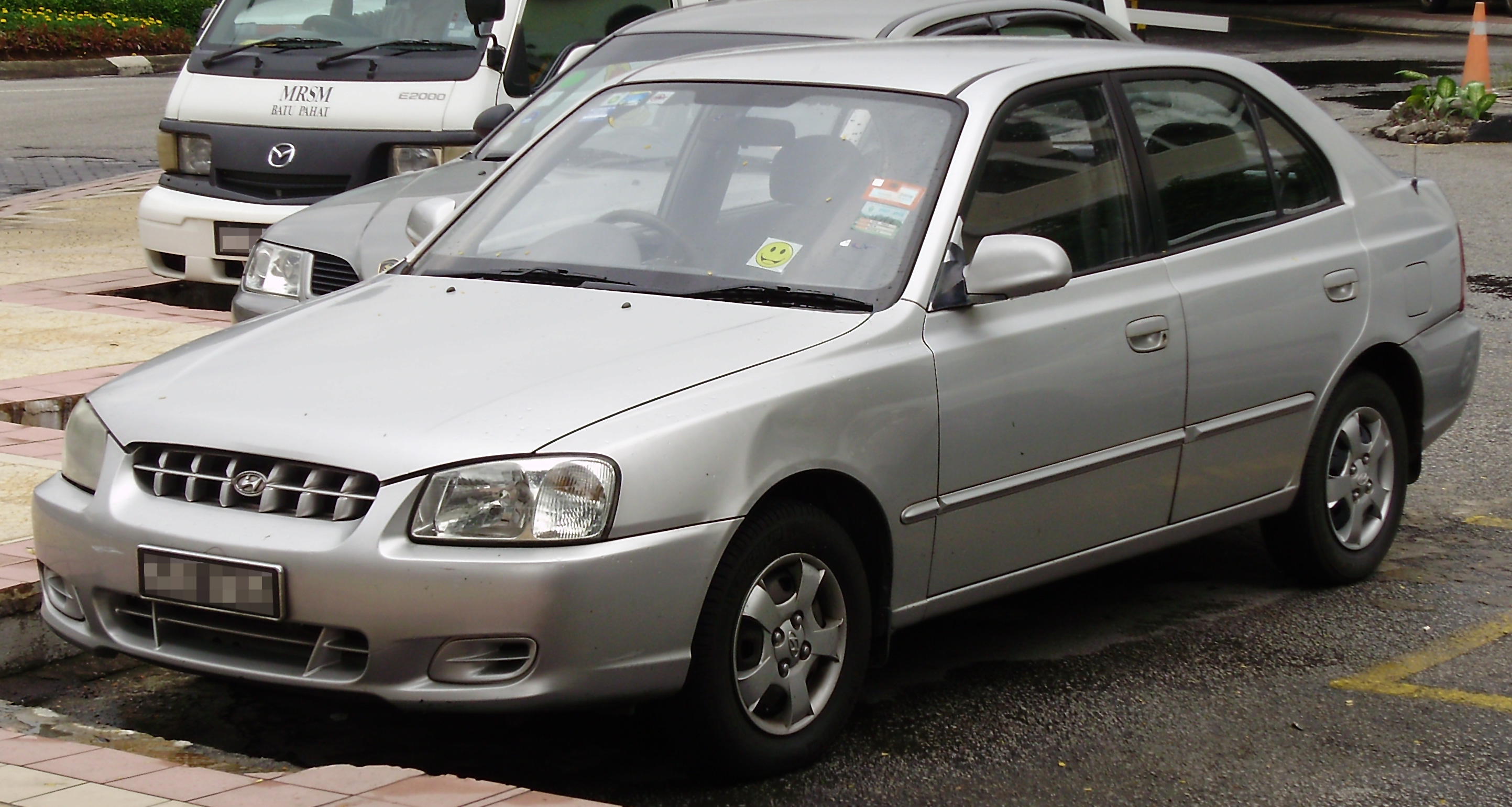
Hyundai Accent
2000 to 2006

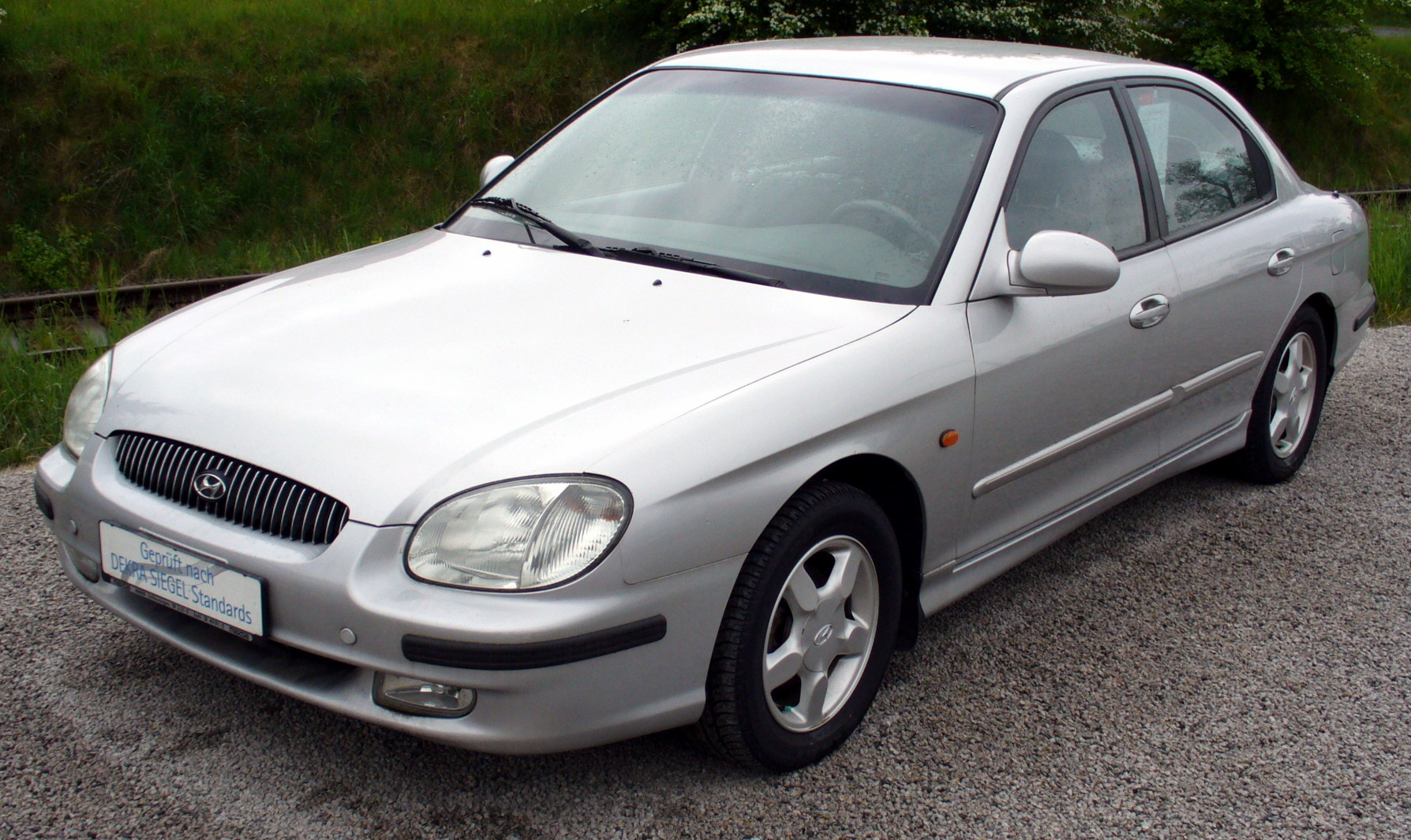
Hyundai Sonata
2000 to 2003

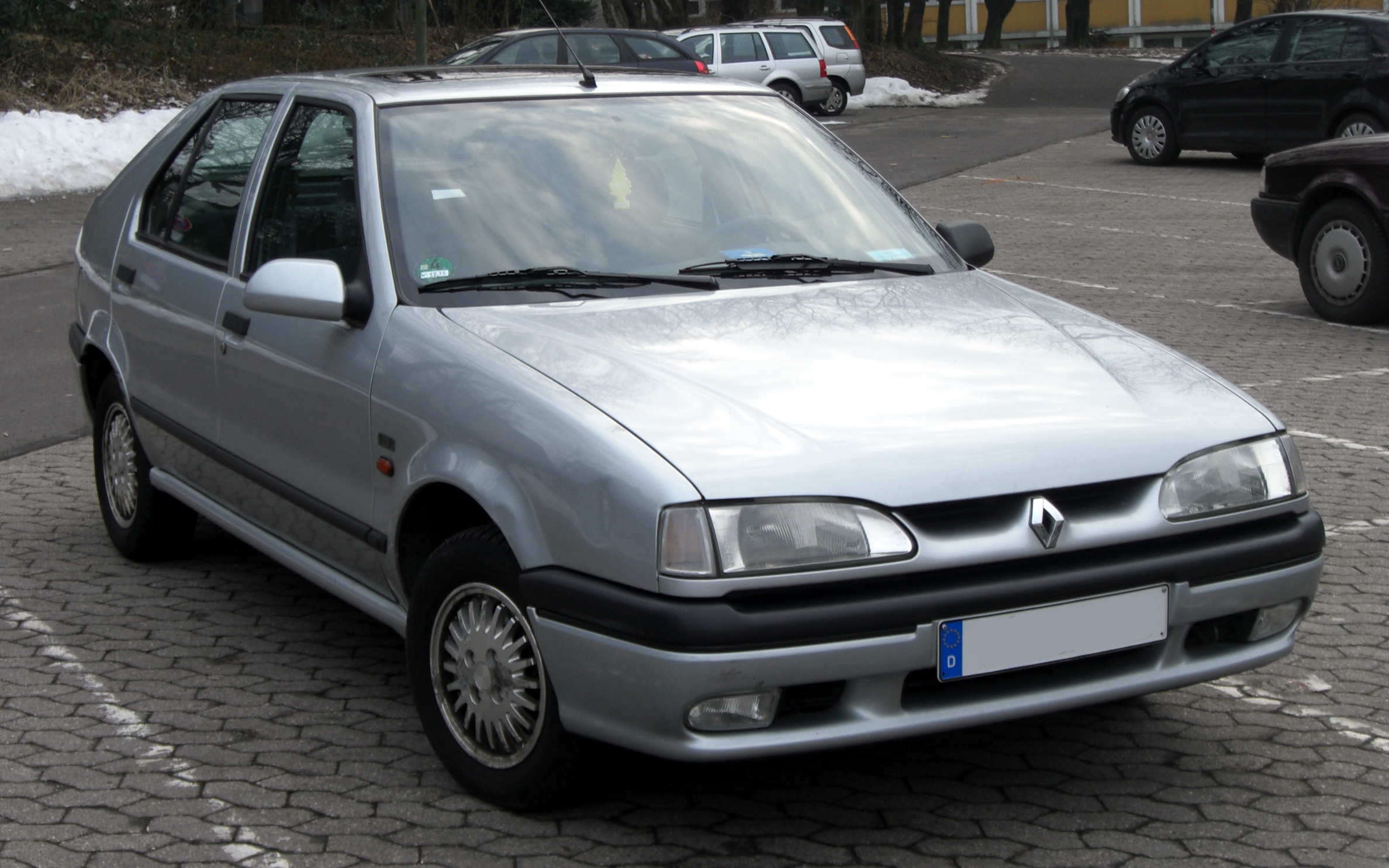
Renault 19
2000 to 2003

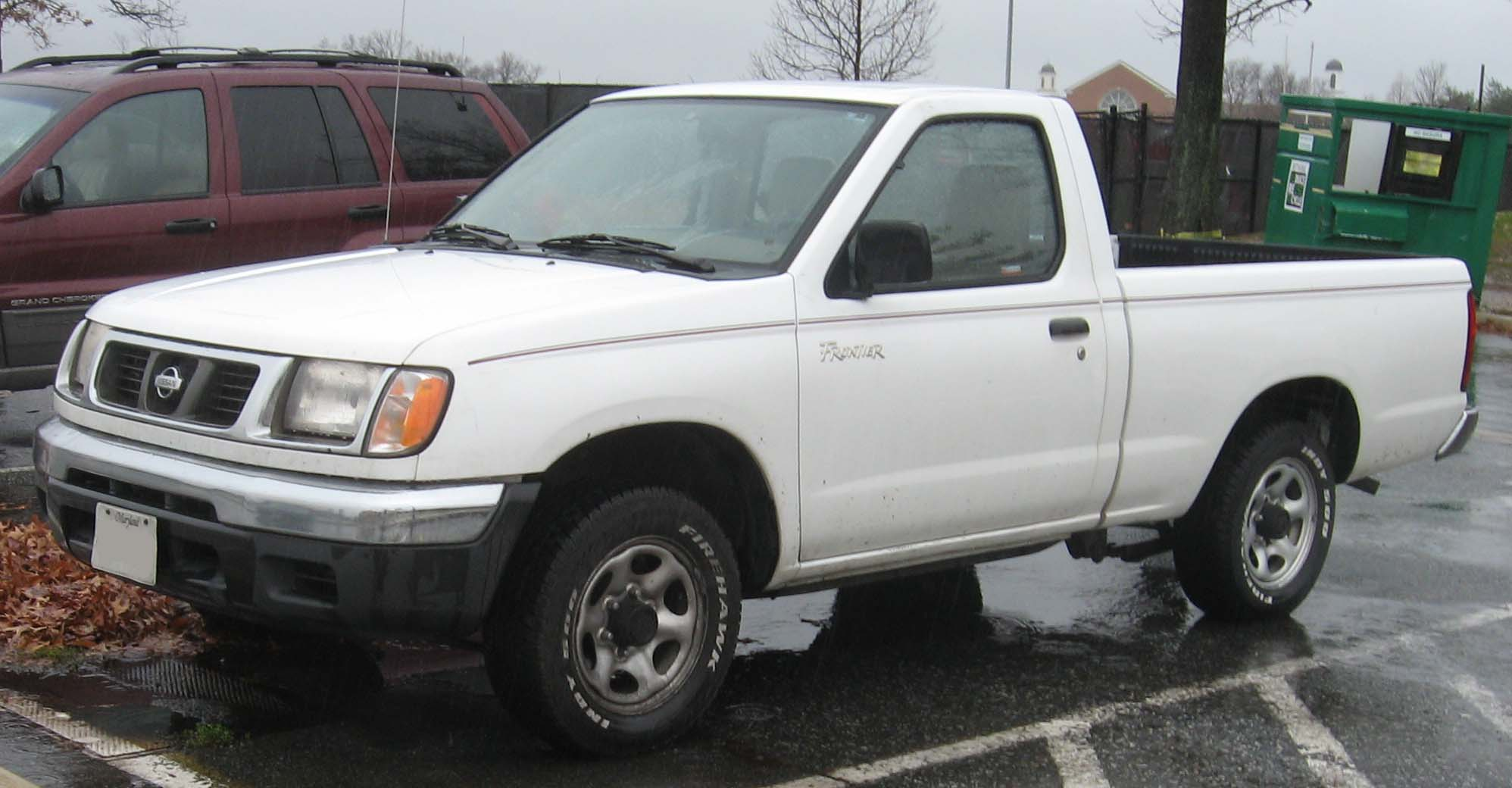
Giad PickUp
2000 to 2008

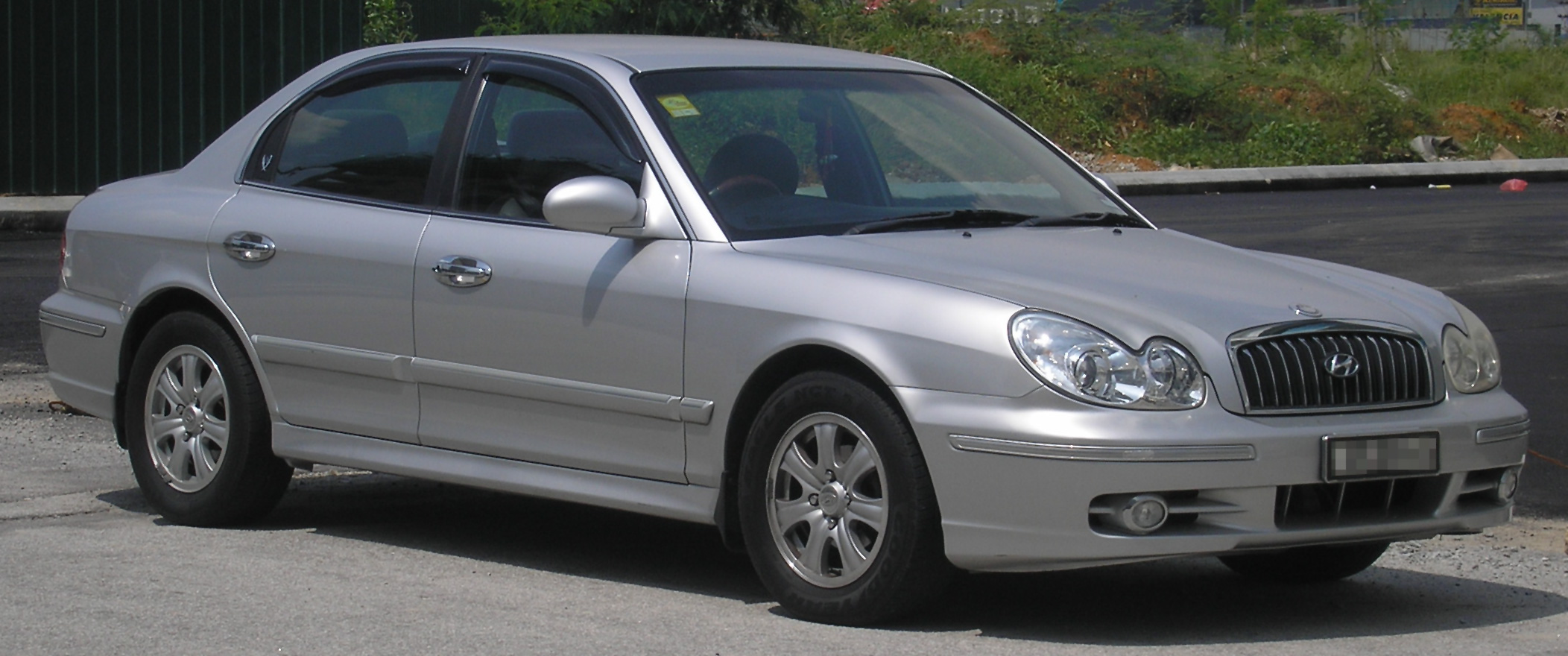
Hyundai Sonata
since 2003

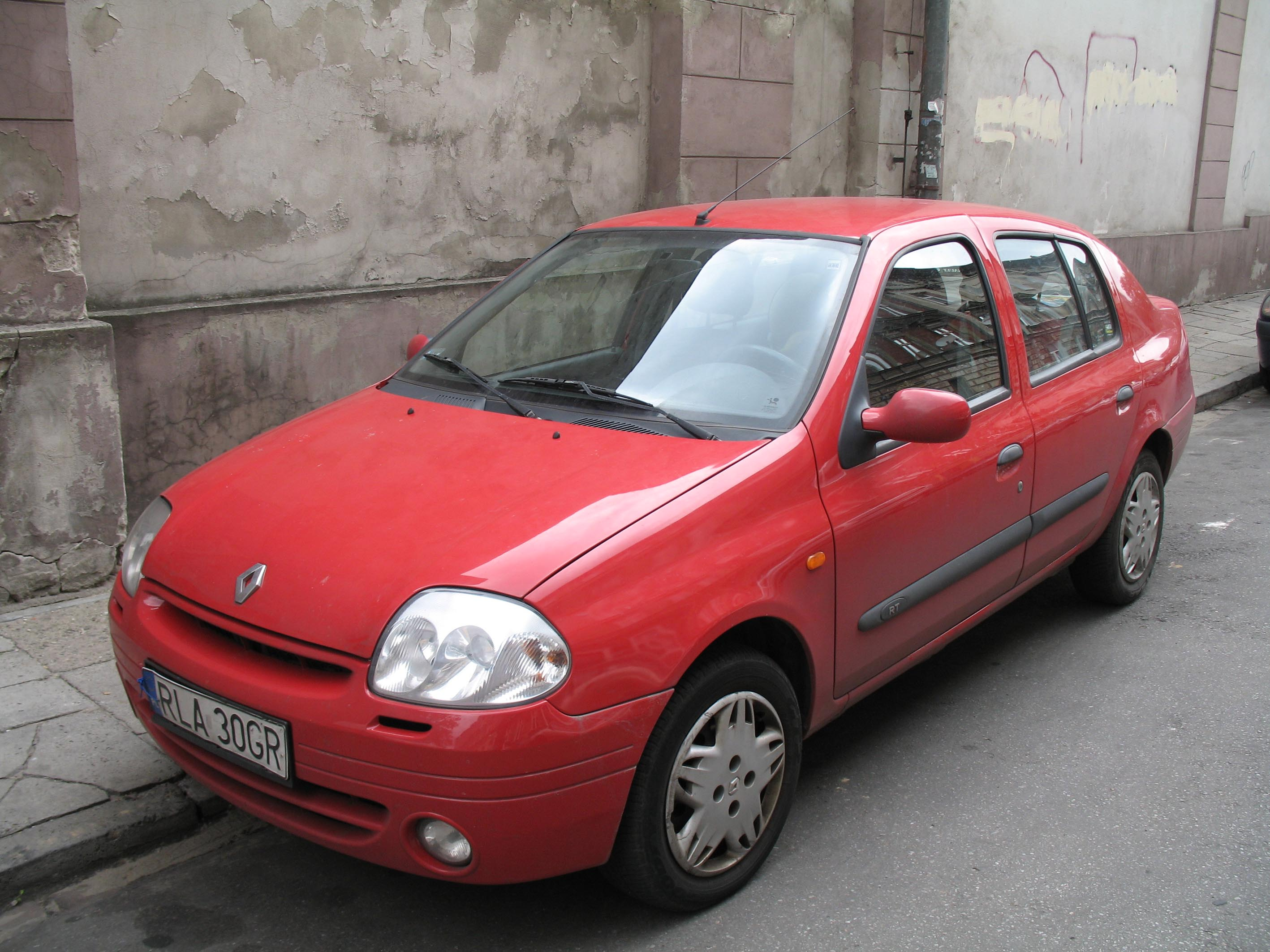
Renault Clio
2003 to 2010

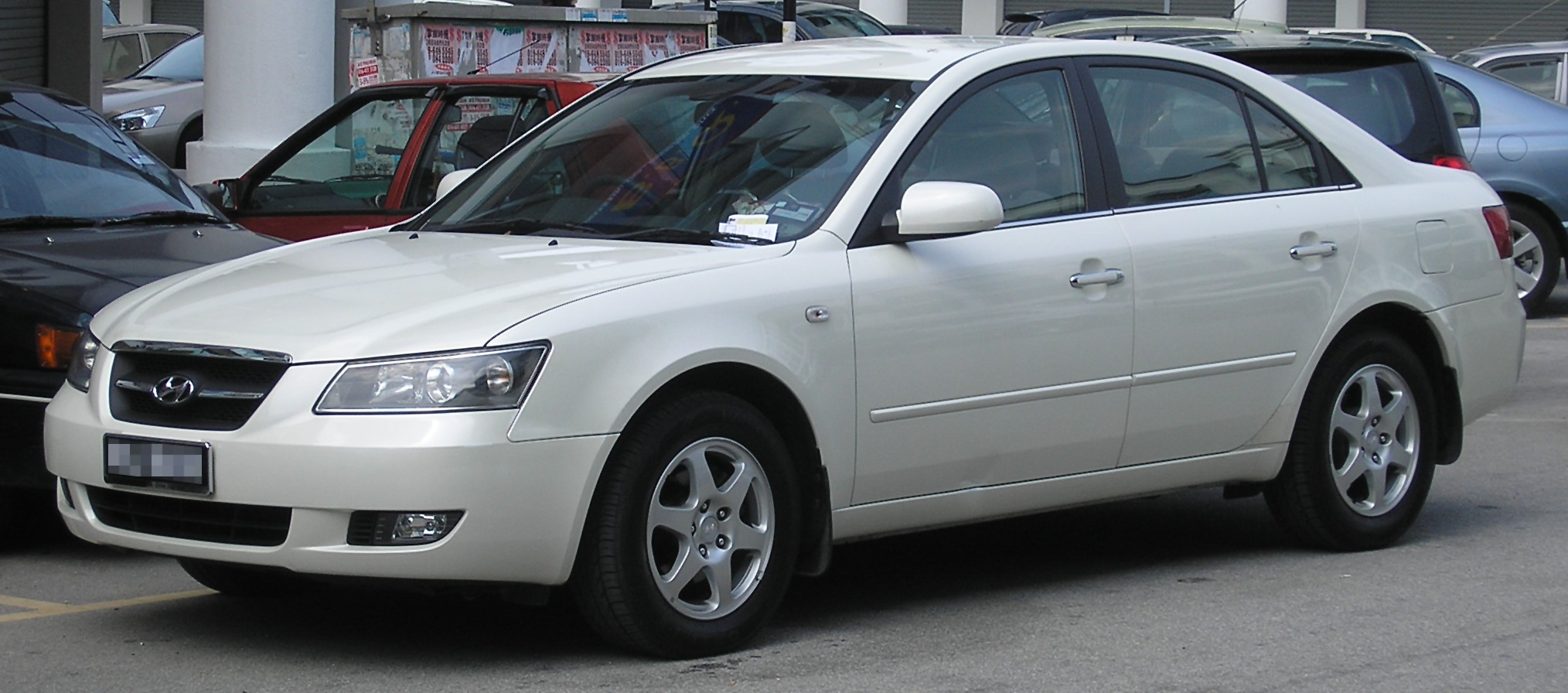
Hyundai Sonata NF
since 2005

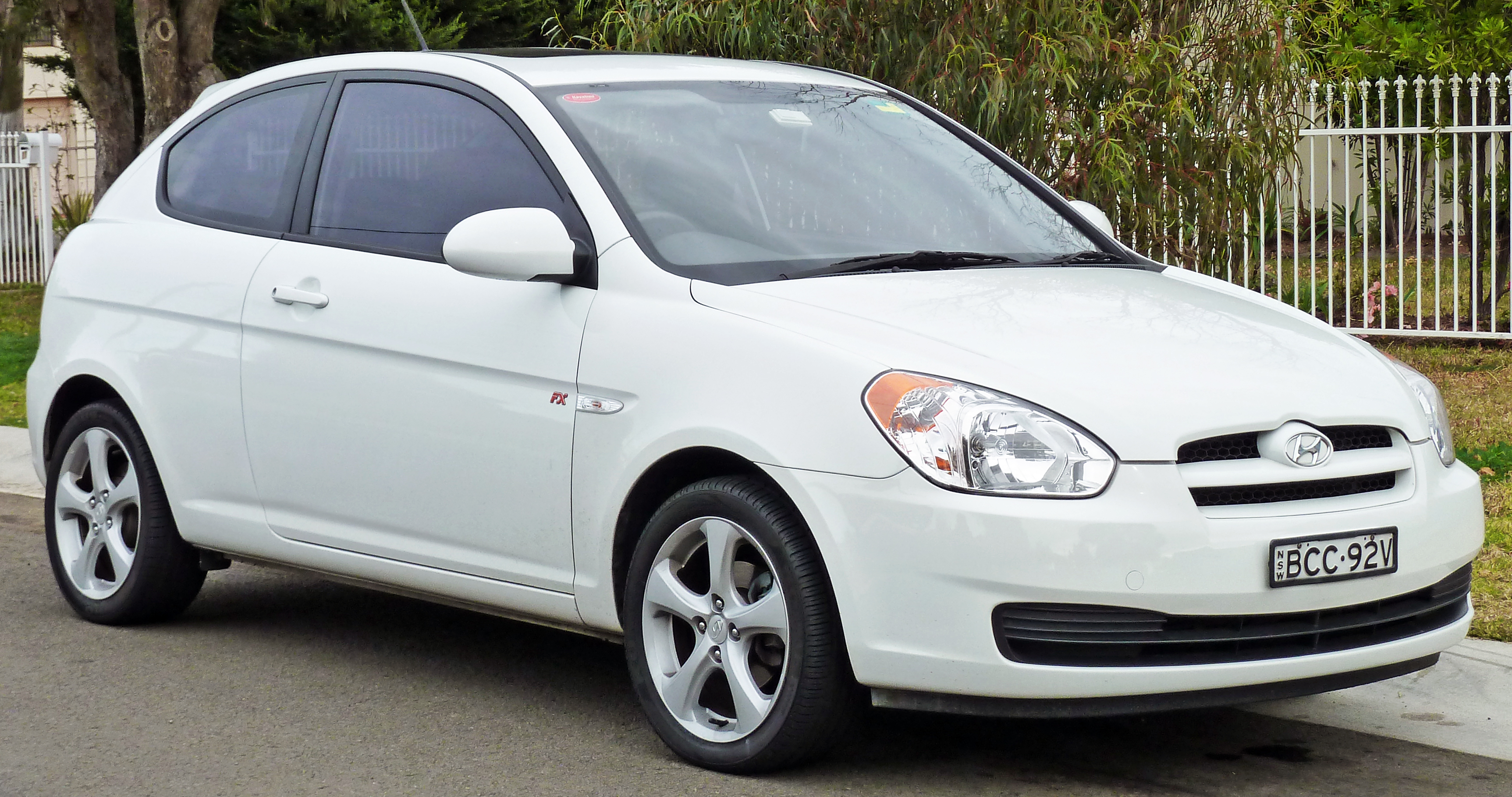
Hyundai Accent
since 2006

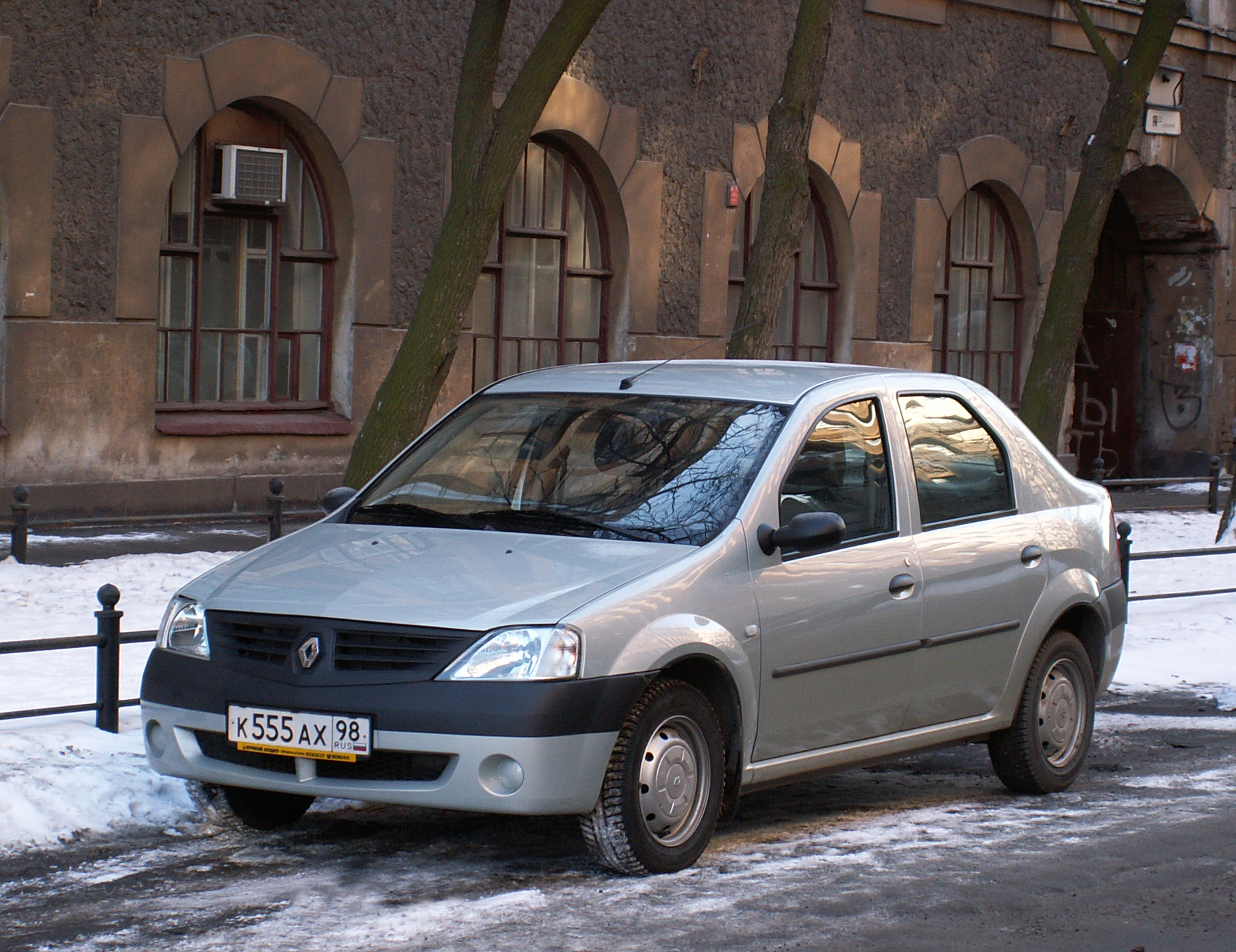
Renault Logan
2006 to 2014

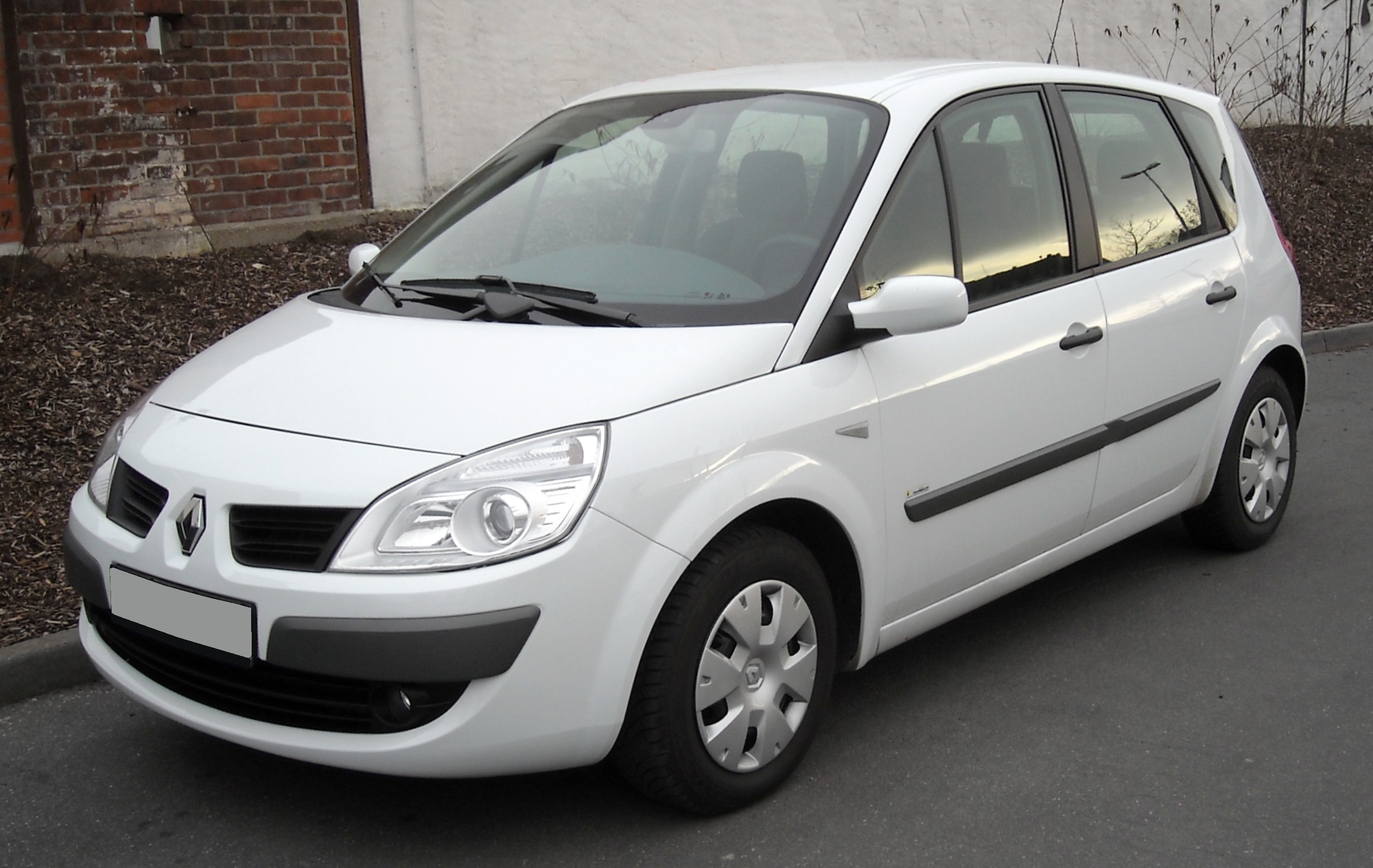
Renault Scénic
2006 to 2010

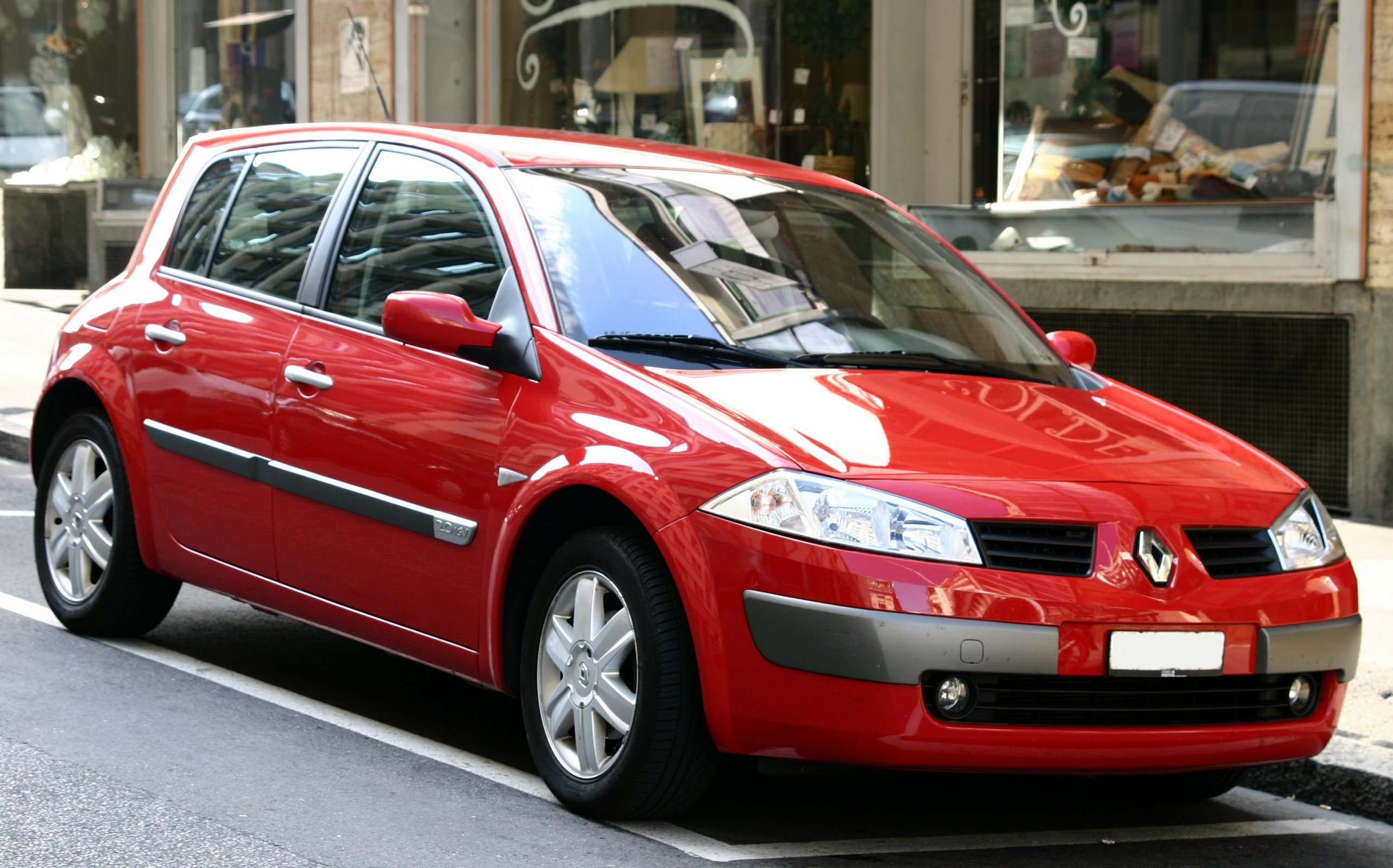
Renault Mégane
since 2007

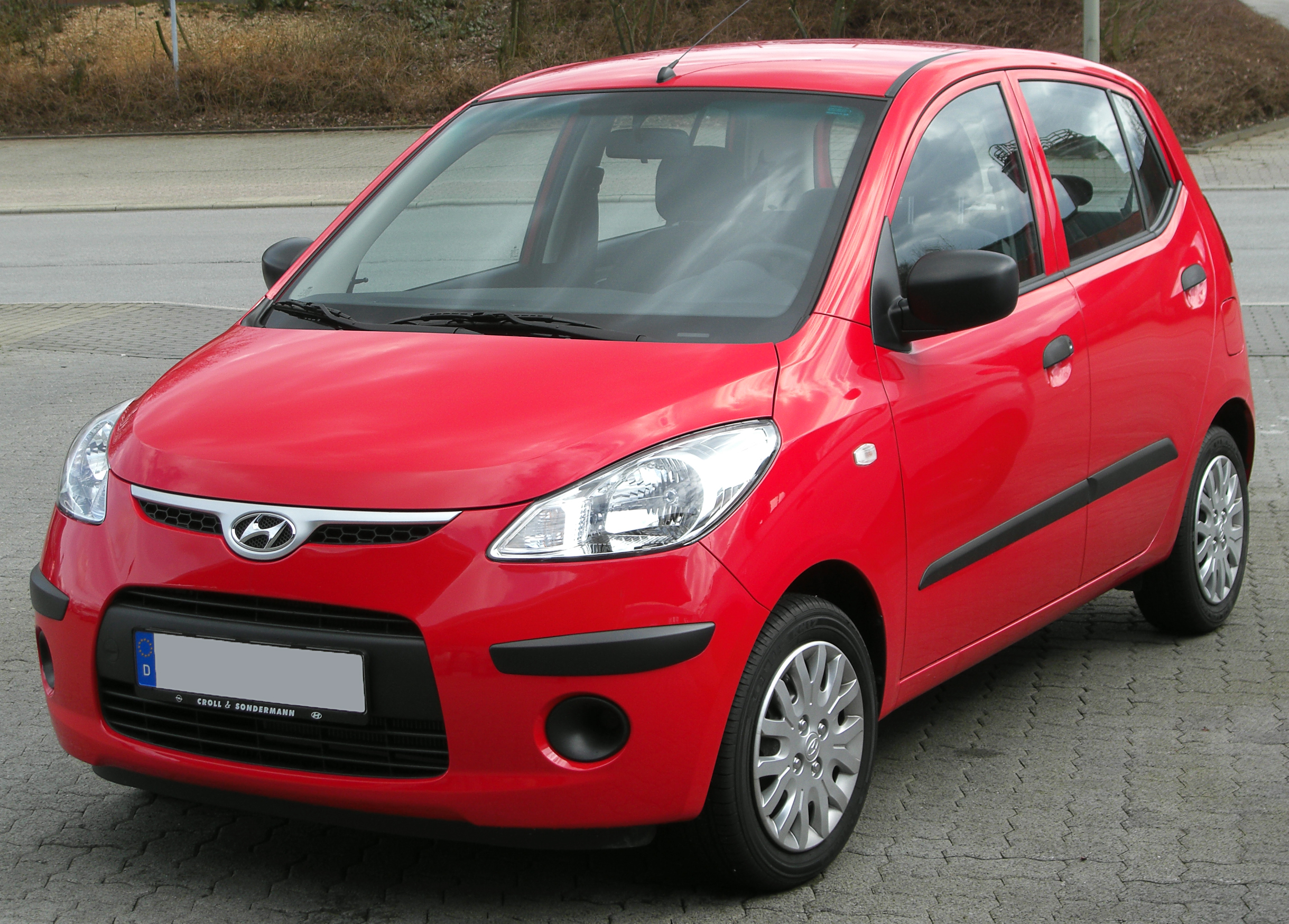
Hyundai i10
since 2009

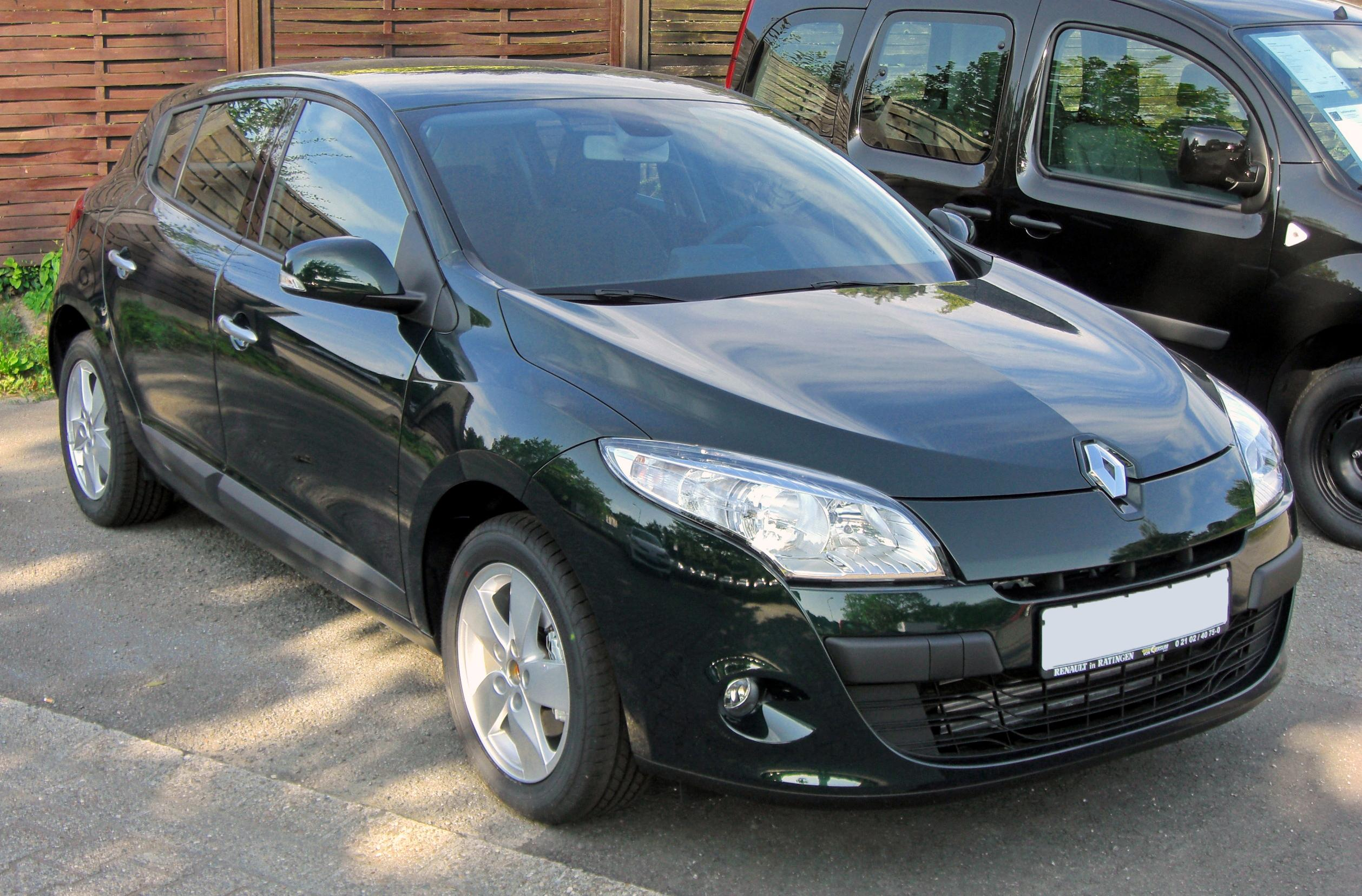
Renault Mégane
since 2009
for export

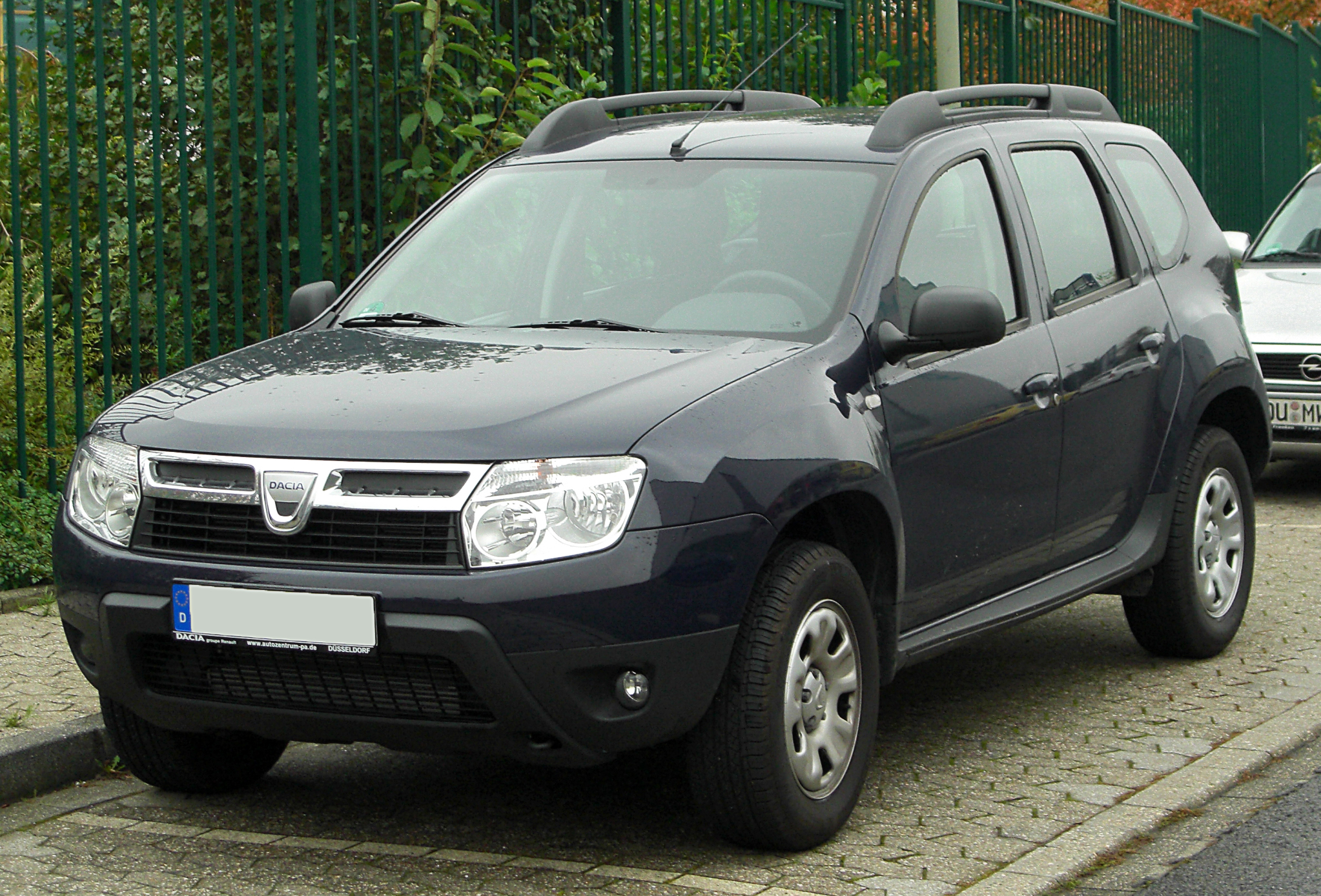
Renault Duster
since 2010

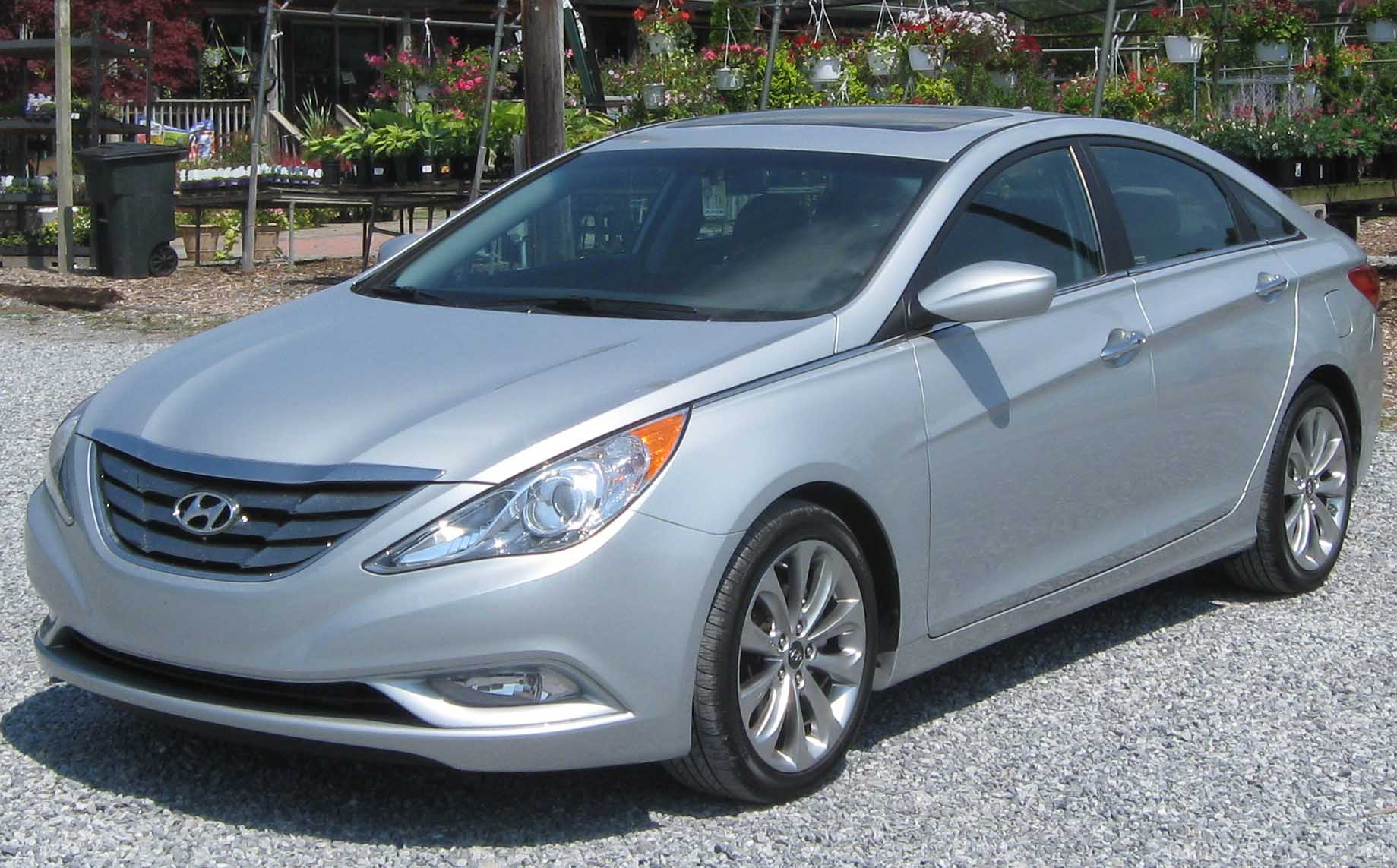
Hyundai Sonata
since 2010

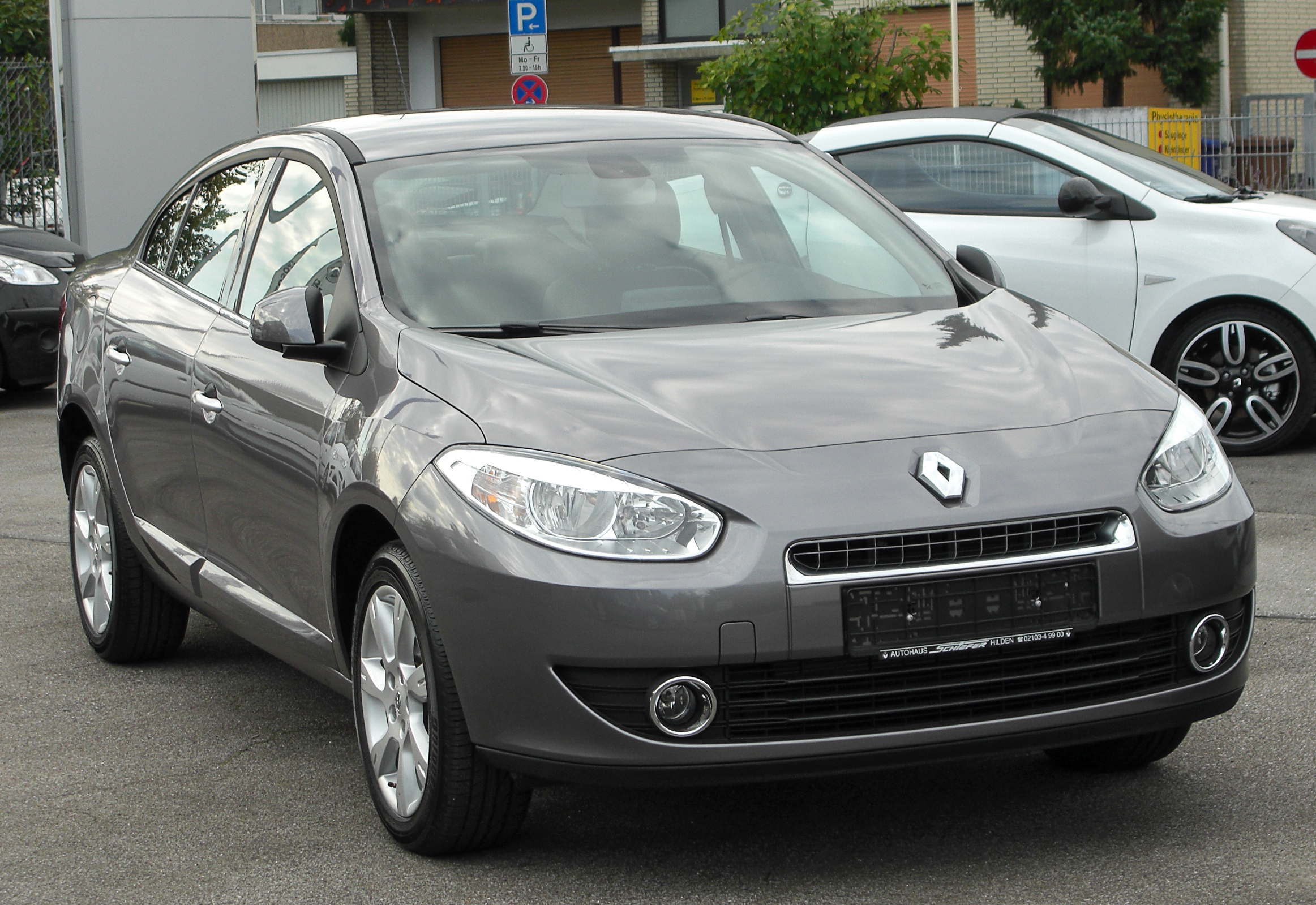
Renault Fluence
since 2010

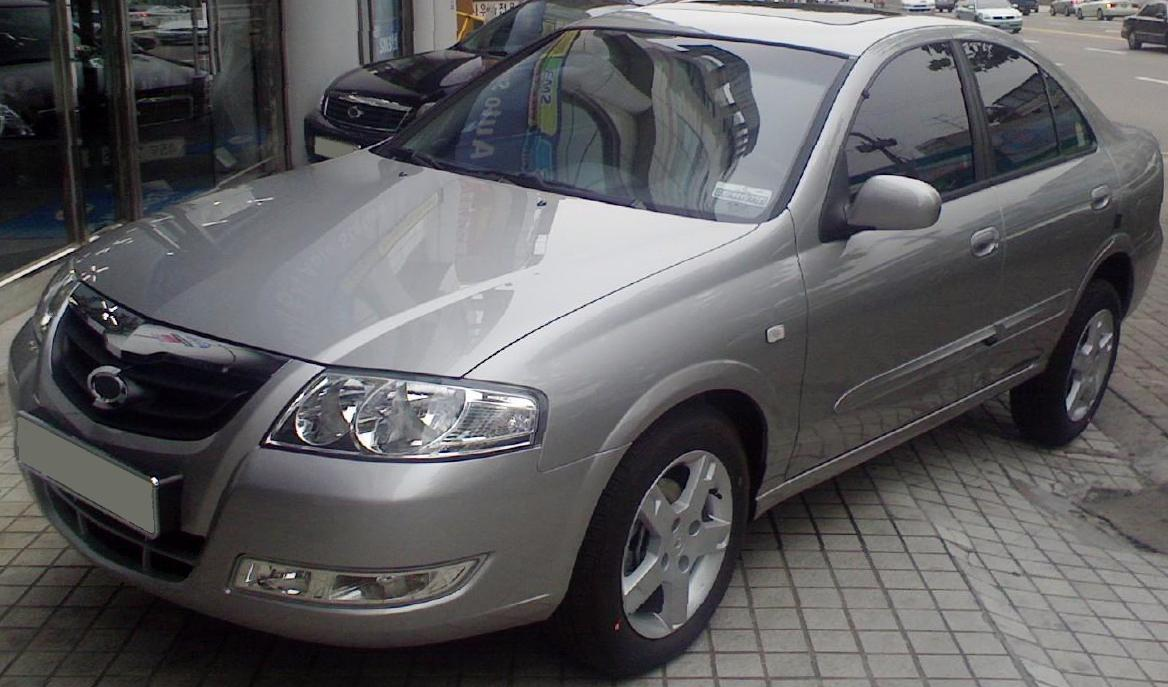
Renault Scala
since 2010

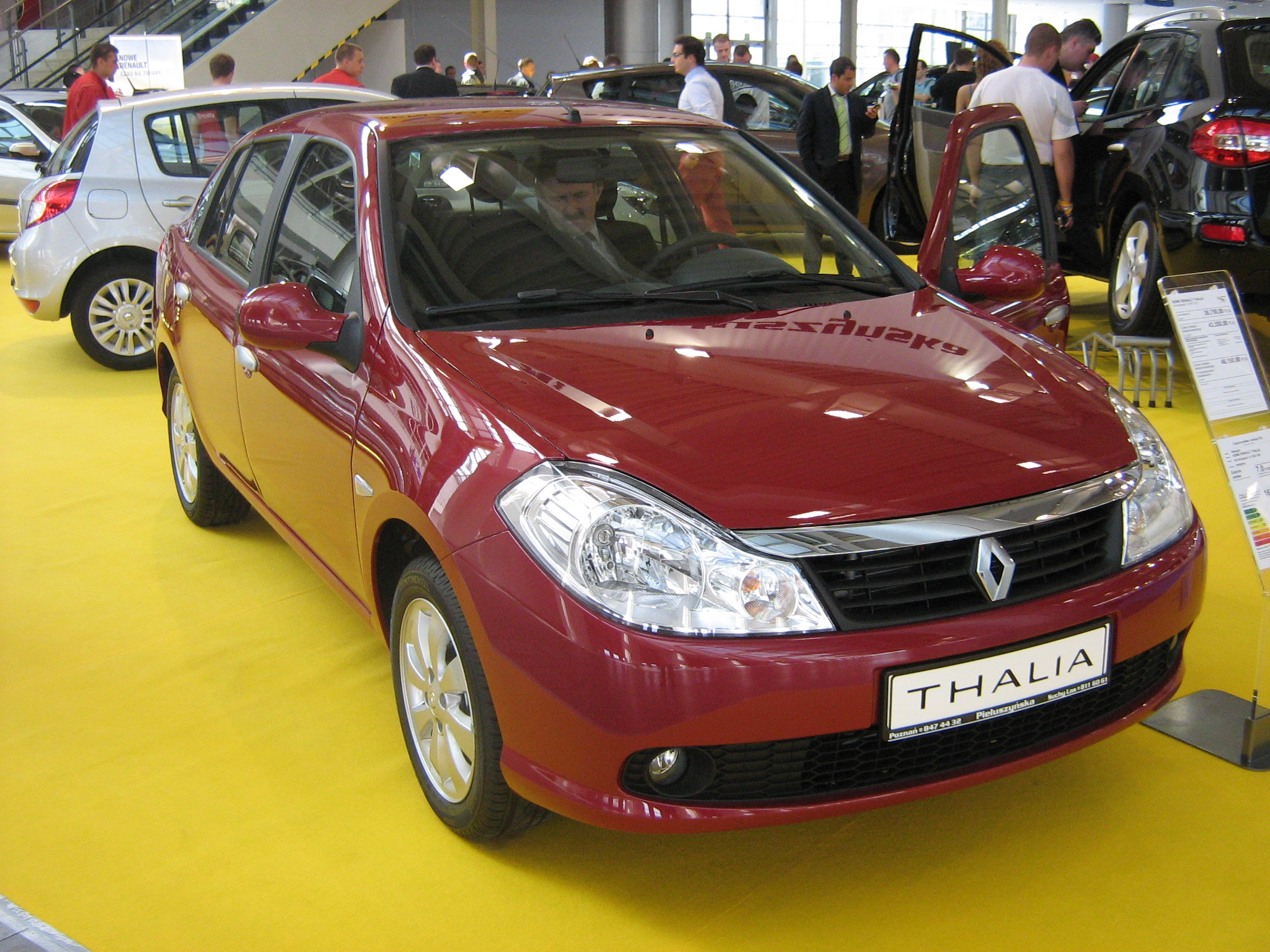
Renault Symbol
since 2010

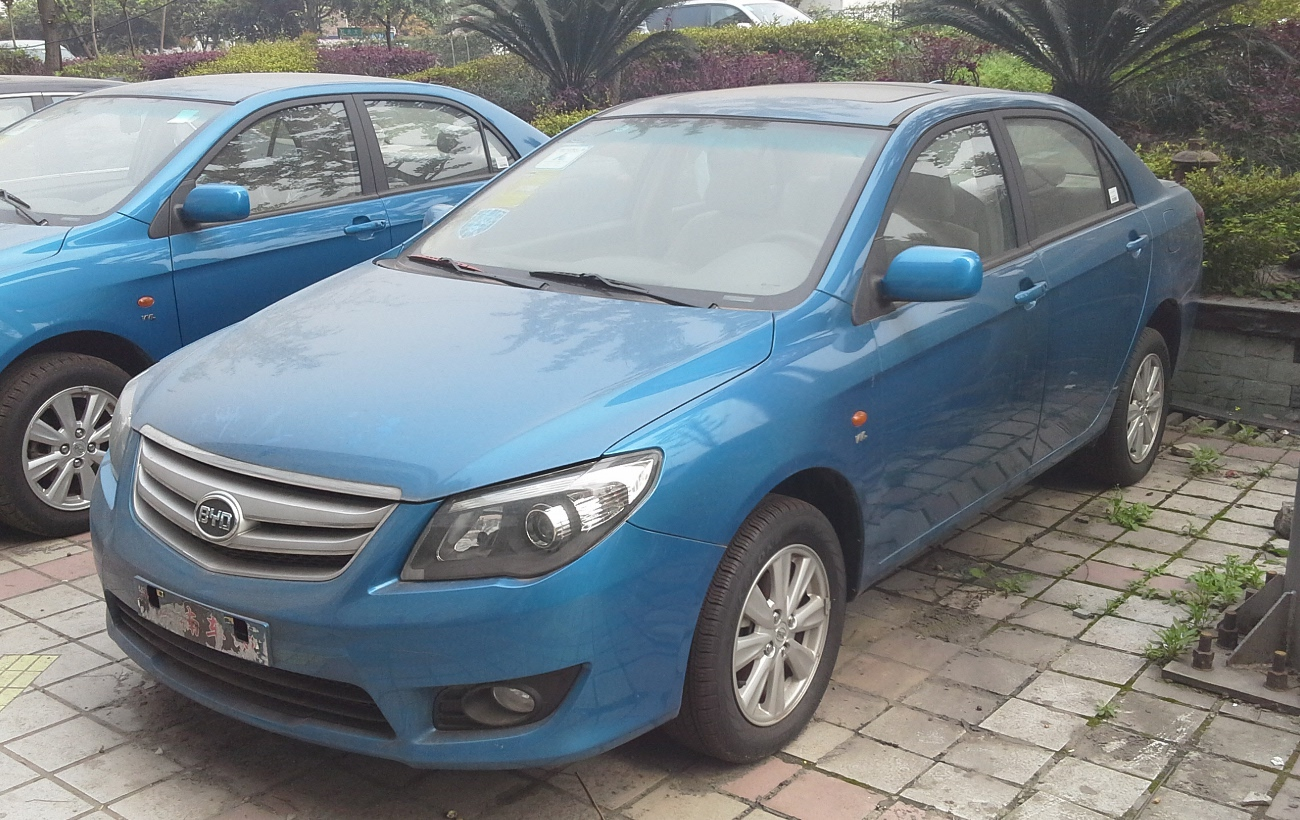
BYD L3
since 2013

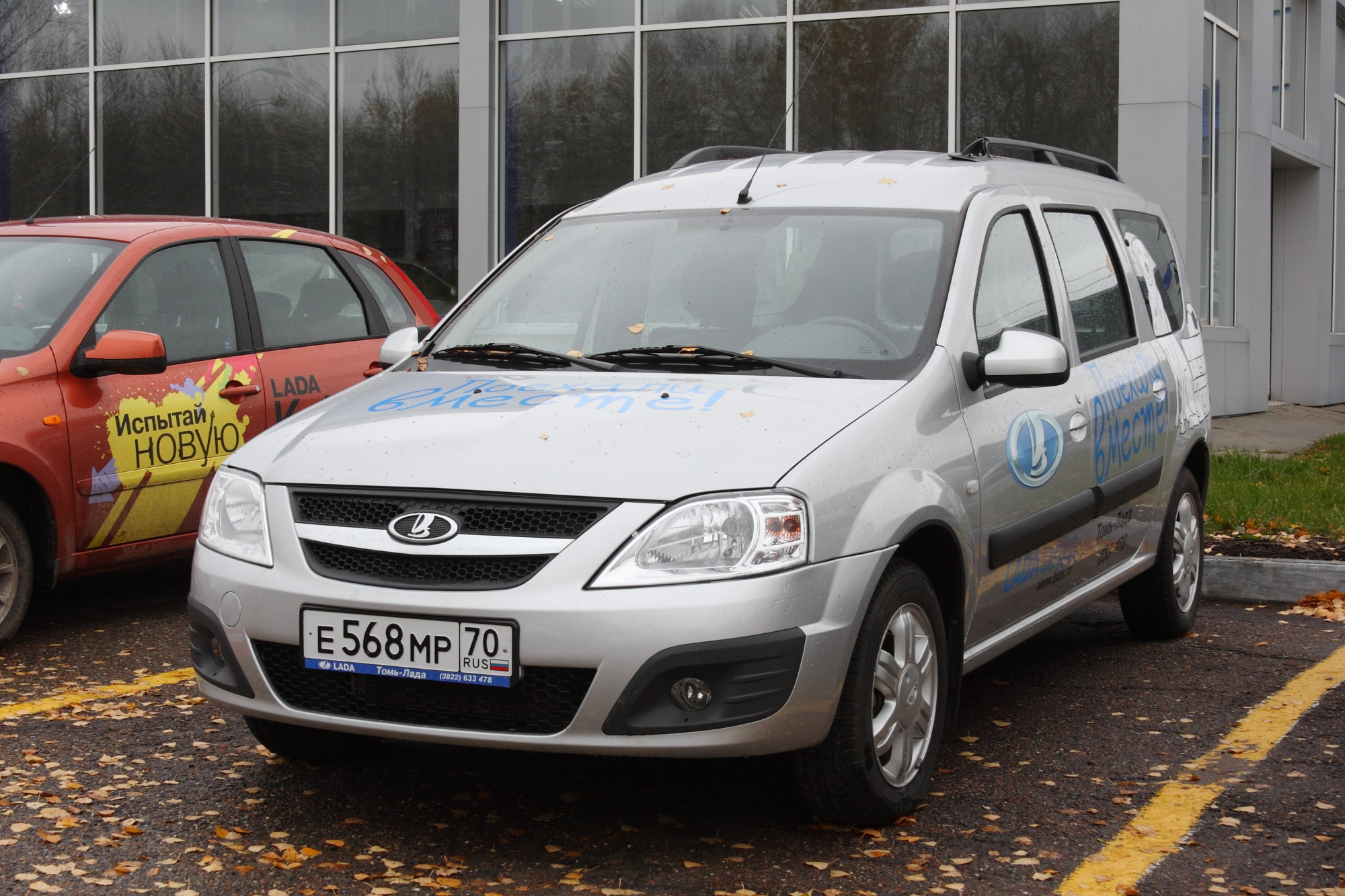
Lada Largus
since 2014

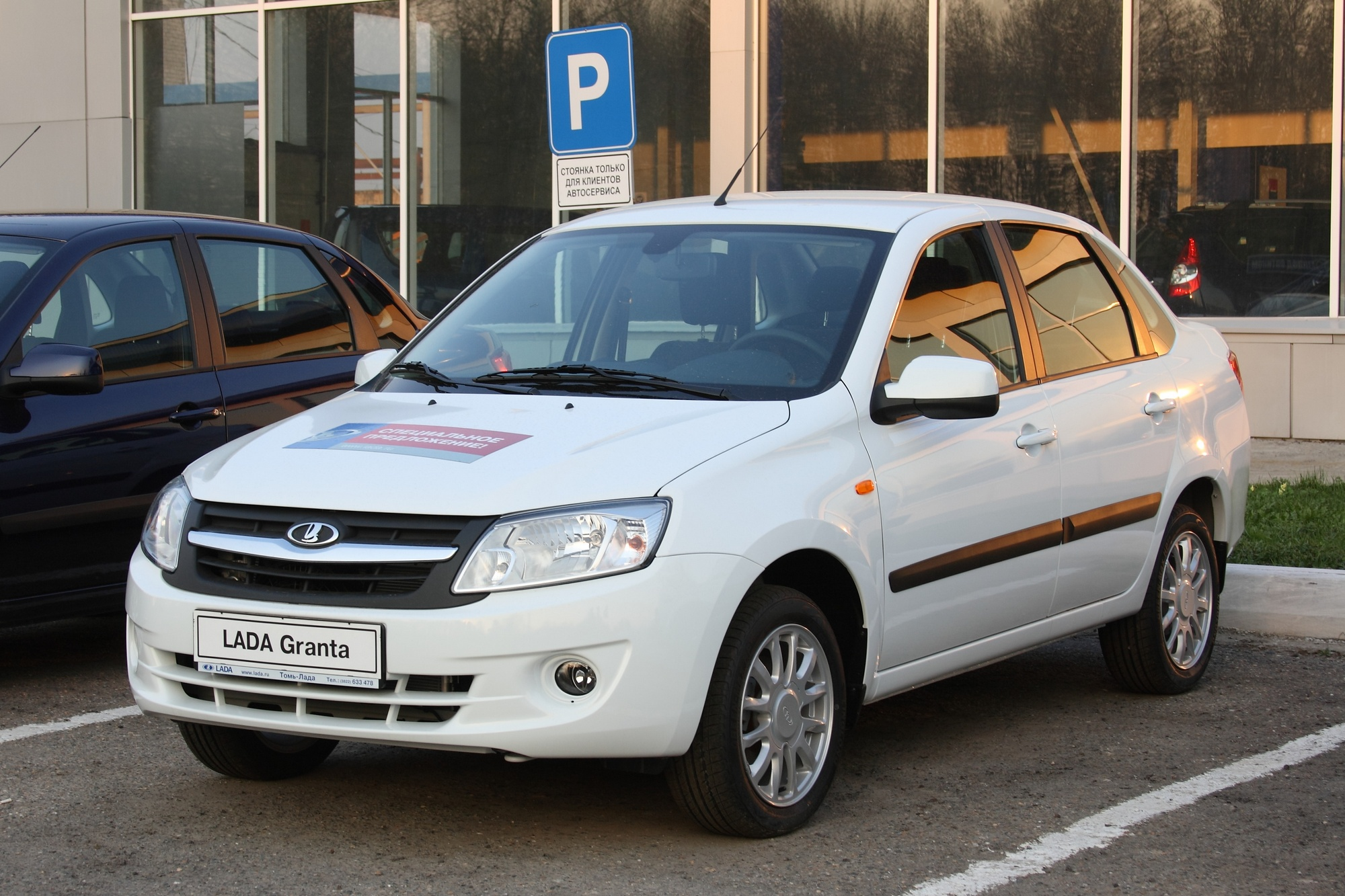
Lada Granta
since 2014

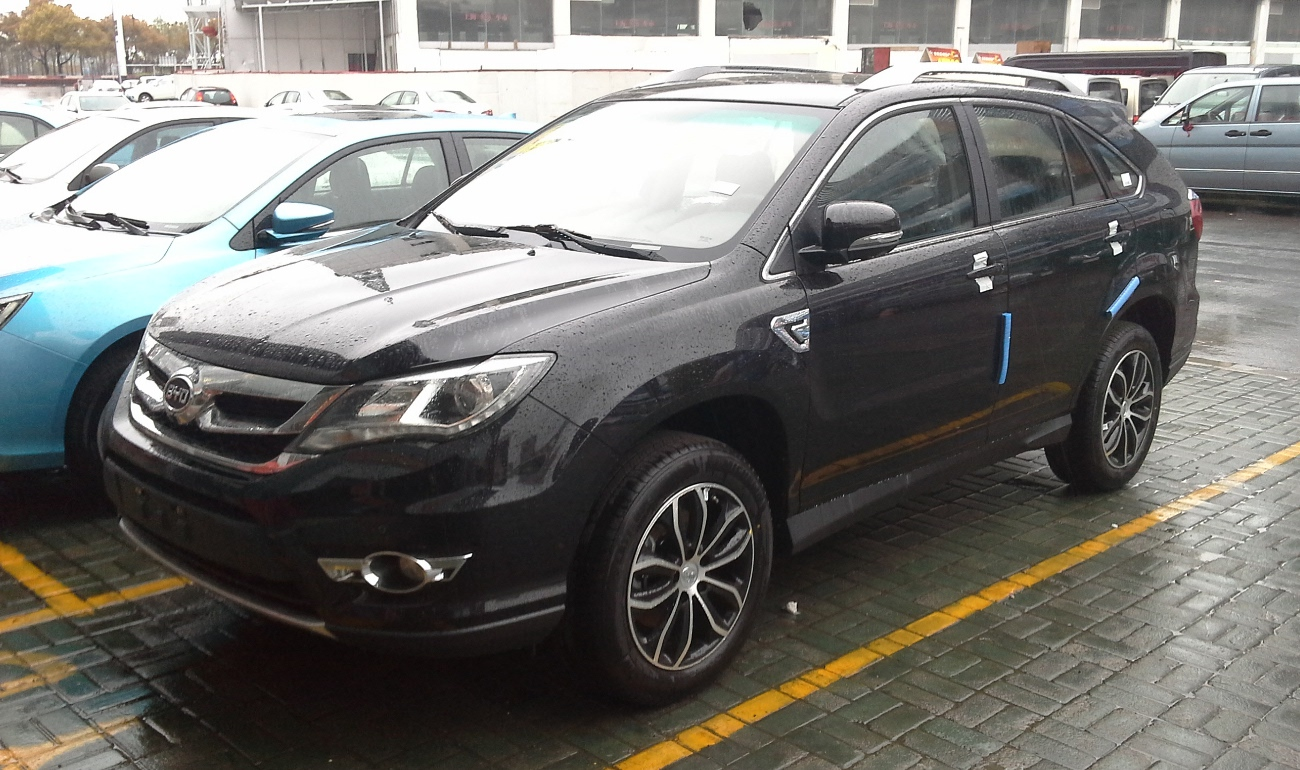
BYD S7
since 2015

== Giad Trucks Co. Ltd. ==
In Giad trucks are buses and trucks produced. Besides Volvo vehicles are also here Renault models produced. Every year, 1400 trucks and 900 buses the workshops.

== Giad Tractors and Agricultural Equipment Co. Ltd. ==
Tractors and other farm machinery, the company produces under another subsidiary. Produced equipment of brands Massey Ferguson, Sinkad and Cetinel Sanmak . Current products are the tractors Massey Ferguson 285, Massey Ferguson MF 290 and 285 Giad. 2500 units are produced here annually.

== Giad Compressor Co. Ltd. ==
The Giad Compressor is a small subsidiary which held 7 of hydraulic and 12 mechanical presses is. The company thus fenders, hoods, trunk lids and tonneau for Toyota forth. Giad Furniture and Medical Appliances Co. Ltd..

With the company founded in May 2003, the manufacturer is also represented on the medical market. Products are medical equipment such as furniture for schools and educational institutions. The materials are mainly wood, aluminum, plastic and fiberglass used. The metallic equipment, the firm relies on a nickel - coating . However one of the main products of the subsidiary are car seats for physically handicapped persons.

== Giad Motor Service Co. Ltd. ==
For after-sales management Giad the Motor Service is responsible to the Group. This company is responsible for the supply of spare parts as well as the maintenance of the vehicles. In order to maintain the service, even an international training center for budding is engineers and technicians out.

== Giad Paints Co. Ltd. ==
Giad Paints is responsible for the painting of vehicles and vehicle parts. In addition to its core business operations, it also undertakes specialized work. A total of two paint lines are operated.
