= PDOC Headquarters =

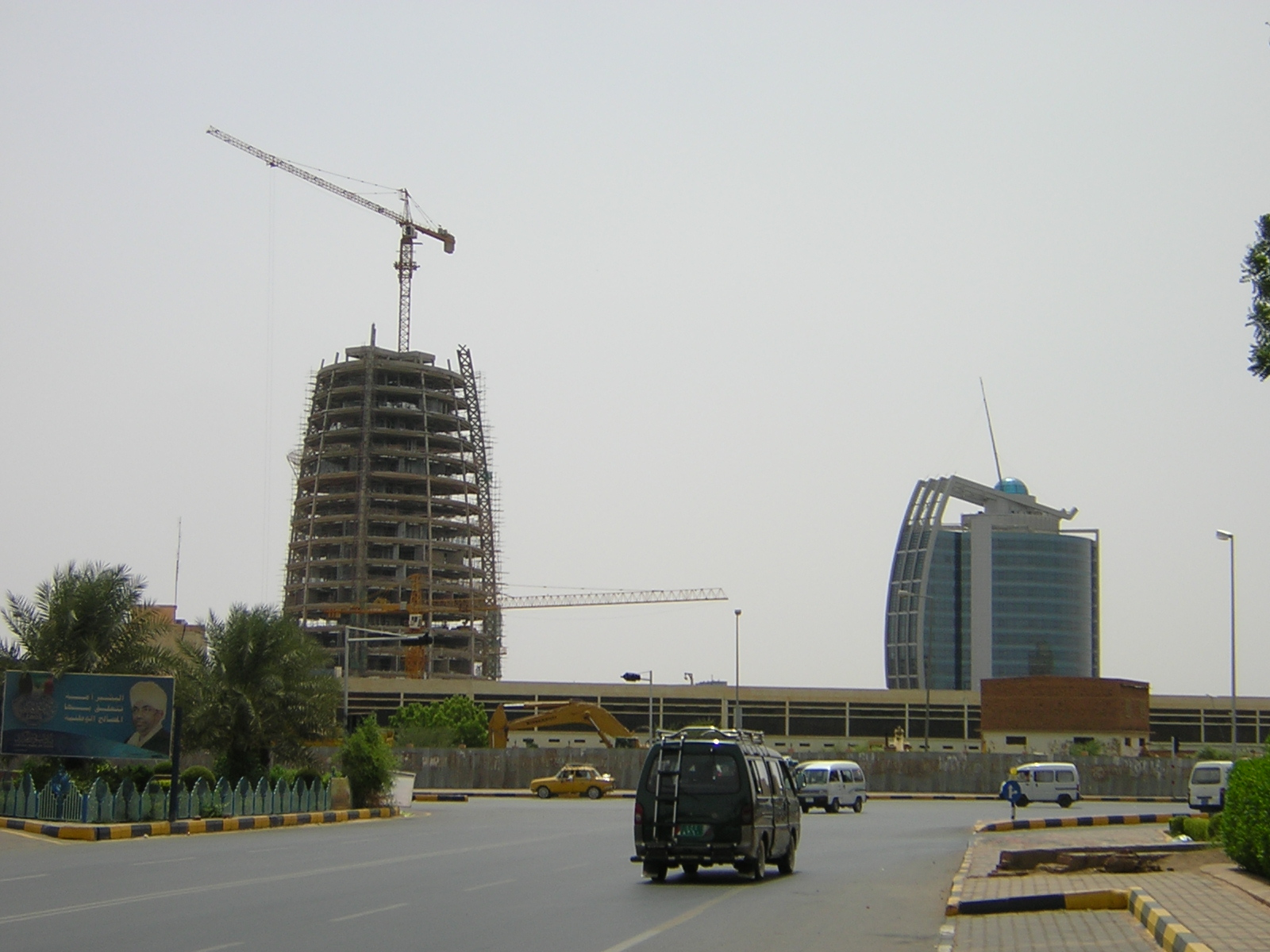
- The near-finished PDOC Headquarters in 2009 on right (the under-construction GNPOC Tower on left)
- Alternative names: PDOC Tower

General information
- Status: Completed
- Type: Office
- Location: Khartoum, Sudan
- Coordinates: 15°36′22″N 32°29′58″E
- Construction started: 2008
- Completed: 2010
- Owner: PetroDar Operating Company Ltd

Height
- Roof: 71.35 m (234 ft)

Technical details
- Floor count: 15

Design and construction
- Architect: Engineering Consultants Group S.A.

The PDOC Headquarters (PetroDar Operating Company) is a high-rise building located in Khartoum, Sudan. Construction of the 71.35 m (234.1 ft), 15-story building was finished in 2010. The building was designed by Engineering Consultants Group S.A.

During the Sudanese Civil War which started in 2023, the building caught fire during the Battle of Khartoum. The building was gutted and nearly destroyed, leading to questions if it would be rebuilt or demolished.
