= Fula oil field =

Oil field in South Sudan

Fula
- Country: Sudan
- Region: Muglad Basin
- Offshore/onshore: onshore
- Operator: China National Petroleum Corporation

Field history
- Discovery: 2001
- Start of production: 2004

Production
- Estimated oil in place: 100 million tonnes (~ 118×10^{6} m^{3} or 745 million bbl)

The Fula oil field is an oil field located in Muglad Basin. It was discovered in 2001 and developed by China National Petroleum Corporation. It began production in 2004 and produces oil. The total proven reserves of the Fula oil field are around 745 million barrels (100 million tonnes), and production is centered on 55,000 barrels per day (8,700 m^{3}/d).
