= Tourism in Sudan =

Tourism in Sudan is a minor contributor to the country's economy. As of 2019, travel and tourism contributed about 2.4% of Sudan’s gross domestic product (GDP). Sudan is infrequently visited compared to other African countries, and long-running internal conflict has damaged the country's tourism industry.

International tourists numbered approximately 591,000 in 2013, an increase from 29,000 as of 1995. As of 2013, approximately 1.3% of the Sudanese labor force was employed in tourism.

Popular activities include rafting, kayaking, trekking, and Nile cruises. Popular attractions include Dinder National Park, the Marrah Mountains, the National Museum, and the Red Sea coast. Archaeological sites are also of tourist interest and include the Pyramids of Meroë, tombs at Kerma, and the temple at Soleb.

There has been recent investment in tourism, but Sudan's tourist infrastructure is underdeveloped. The Sudanese government's tourism strategy focuses on ecotourism. Since 2010, the private Sudan International University has offered education in tourism through its Faculty of Tourism and Hotels.
