= Greater Nile Petroleum Operating Company =

Petroleum production company in Sudan

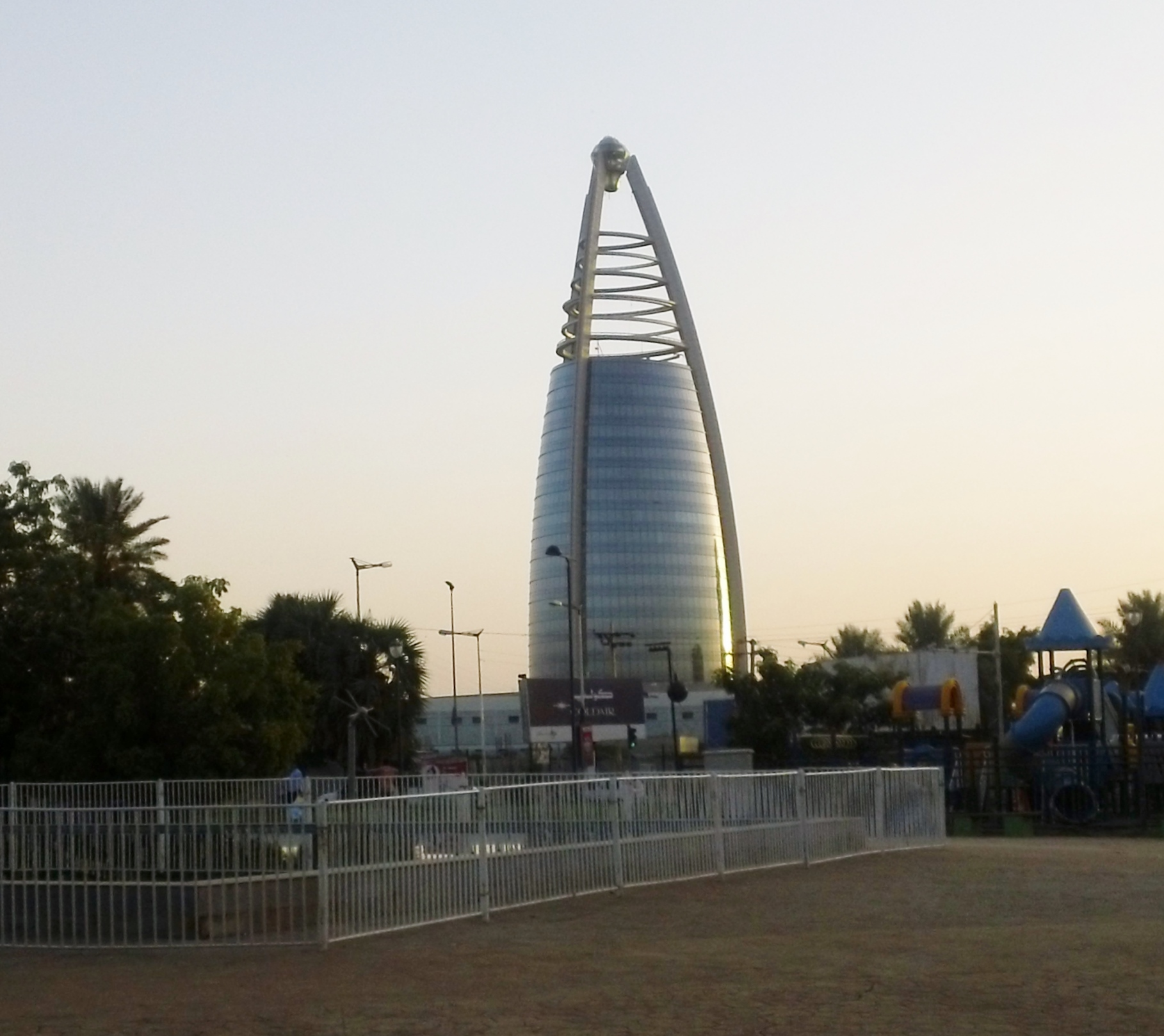
- GNPOC Headquarters in Khartoum, Sudan also known as GNPOC Tower as seen from al-Taif Park in 2015
- Type: Joint venture
- Industry: Oil and gas industry
- Founded: 18 June 1997
- Headquarters: 15°36′18″N 32°30′5″E, Khartoum, Sudan
- Key people: Zhang Pinxian (President); Fadul (VP)
- Products: Petroleum
- Website: www.gnpoc.com

The Greater Nile Petroleum Operating Company (GNPOC) is a petroleum exploration and production company operating in Sudan. It was incorporated on 18 June 1997 and undertook construction of the Greater Nile Oil Pipeline which links Sudan's inland oil fields with refineries at Khartoum and Port Sudan.

The GNPOC concession in the Western Upper Nile area includes the large Unity and Heglig oil fields plus smaller fields at El Toor, El Noor, Toma South, Bamboo, Munga and Diffra.

== Headquarters ==
GNPOC Headquarters building is known the Greater Nile Petroleum Oil Company Tower or GNPOC Tower. The building is a skyscraper in Khartoum, Sudan. Construction of the 65.72 m (215.6 ft), 18-storey building was finished in 2010 and was designed by KEO International Consultants. The 14,000 m^{2} (150,000 sq ft) building housed the headquarters of the Greater Nile Petroleum Operating Company and it was designed by KEO International Consultants.

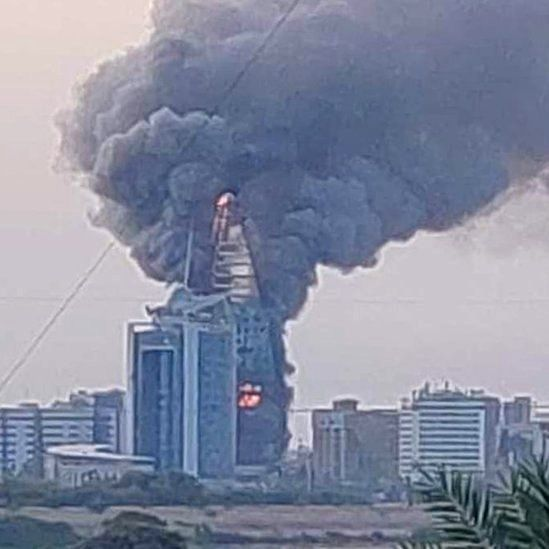
The tower on 17 September 2023

On 17 September 2023, the building suffered heavy fire damage amid the Sudanese civil war during clashes between the Sudanese Armed Forces and Rapid Support Forces. The fire was severe, and the building was gutted and nearly destroyed, leading to questions if it would be rebuilt or demolished.

== Stakeholders ==
GNPOC is a joint operating company owned by:

- China National Petroleum Corporation: 40%
- Petronas Carigali Overseas of Malaysia: 30%
- ONGC Videsh (the overseas arm of ONGC) of India: 25%
- Sudapet (Sudan National Petroleum Corporation, the national oil company of Sudan): 5%

Both Gulf Petroleum and Al Thani Corporation formerly owned a 5% share each. Canadian company Talisman Energy (previously known as Arakis) was an original stakeholder. Its share was sold to ONGC Videsh in 2003.

The U.S. government imposed economic sanctions against Sudan in 1997, due to the Sudanese government's alleged sponsorship of international terrorism and poor human rights record. The sanctions prohibited trade between the United States and Sudan, as well as investment by U.S. businesses in Sudan. In February 2000, the U.S. government extended its sanctions to include Sudapet and GNPOC. These sanctions were lifted after the Sudanese revolution of 2018/19 and ensuing negotiations between the two governments at the end of 2020.

== See also ==
- Economy of Sudan
- Greater Nile Oil Pipeline
- SPPHC
- GNPOC Headquarters Building
