= Greater Nile Oil Pipeline =

Oil pipelime in South Sudan and Sudan

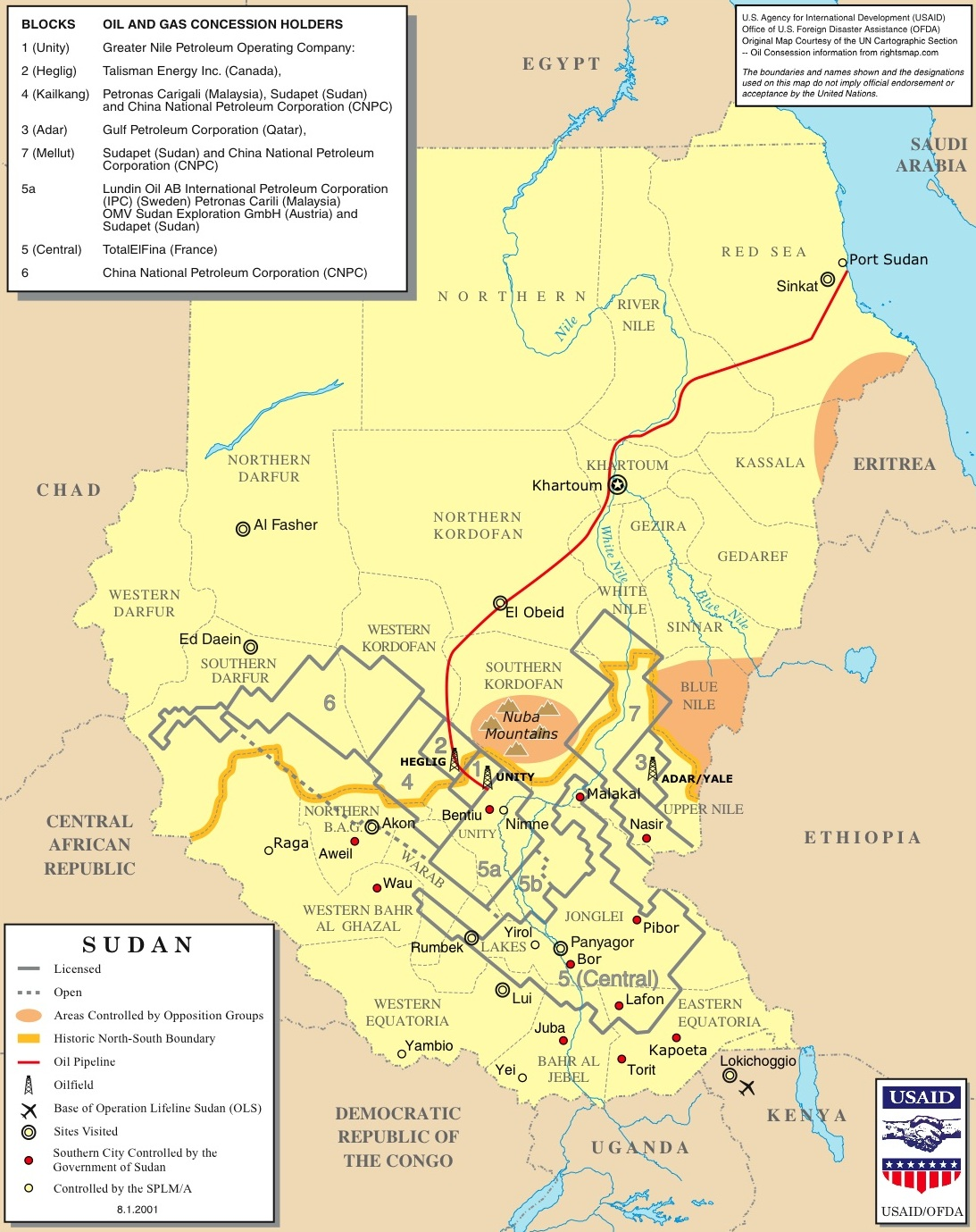
The route taken by the Greater Nile Oil Pipeline is shown in this USAID map of 2001. State borders have changed since 2001.

The Greater Nile Oil Pipeline is an important oil export pipeline in Sudan. It extends for approximately 1,600 kilometres (990 mi) of which approximately 1.8 kilometres is submarine. It was constructed by the Greater Nile Petroleum Operating Company (GNPOC) and commenced operation in 1999. It is operated by the China National Petroleum Corporation (CNPC) which is a 40% stakeholder in GNPOC.

Initially, the pipeline began at the Heglig oil field in South Kurdufan state. Since 1999, the pipeline has been extended and it now begins in the Unity oil field. The pipeline extends to the Port Sudan crude oil refinery on the Red Sea, via the Nuba Mountains and Khartoum.

== See also ==
- Economy of Sudan
