= PetroDar =

Sudanese fossil fuel consortium

PetroDar Operating Company Ltd (PDOC)
- Type: Joint venture
- Industry: Oil & Gas
- Founded: 31 October 2001
- Headquarters: Khartoum, Sudan
- Key people: Azhan Ali (President)
- Products: Oil

The PetroDar Operating Company Ltd is a consortium of oil exploration and production companies operating in Sudan with its headquarters in Khartoum. The consortium was incorporated in the Virgin Islands on 31 October 2001. PetroDar is composed of the China National Petroleum Corporation (CNPC) (41% share), Petronas of Malaysia (40%), Sudapet of Sudan (8%), SINOPEC of China (6%), and Egypt Kuwait Holding Company through its subsidiary Tri-Ocean Energy of Kuwait (5%).

In 2008, PetroDar was engaged in oil exploration and production in blocks 3 and 7, which are oil concession areas located in the Melut Basin in Southern Sudan. The company's production in this area reportedly accounted for almost half of Sudan's total crude oil output in late 2006.

== The Melut oil export pipeline ==
PetroDar operates the Melut oil export pipeline, also known as the PetroDar Pipeline. The pipeline connects the oil fields of the Melut Basin with the refinery and export terminal located at Port Sudan on the Red Sea.

PetroDar pipeline starts from Palouge in the south of the Sudan and continues almost 1600 km to the city of Port Sudan. The pipeline took four years to complete with six pumping stations; Palouge, Algabaleen, Wad-shalaai, Alaylafon, Jebel Umm Ali and Musmar. All the pumping stations are equipped to facilitate the crude oil temperature and flow until it reaches Port Sudan.

== See also ==
- Economy of Sudan
- SPPHC
- PDOC Headquarters Building
