= Melut Basin =

Rift basin in South Sudan

Coordinates: 8.7590°N 32.3580°E

Central African rifts: Melut Basin near center.

The Melut Basin is a rift basin in South Sudan, extending into Ethiopia, where it is called the Gambella basin. Melut is situated in the Upper Nile and Jonglei, south of the capital of Sudan, Khartoum and east of the river Nile. Some parts of the Melut contain several known hydrocarbon accumulations, although oil exploration, as elsewhere in Sudan and South Sudan, has been hindered by instability and conflict. The largest oil field in the Basin is the Great Palogue Field in South Sudan, with estimated reserves of 900 million barrels. The Melut oil export pipeline travels 1,380 km from Palogue to Port Sudan on the Red Sea, and has been on stream since June 2006.

The export pipeline is also known as the PetroDar Pipeline after the name of the consortium which operates it. Crude oil from the Melut Basin is known as "Dar Blend" and is refined at Port Sudan.

== See also ==
- Economy of South Sudan
- Greater Nile Oil Pipeline – Oil pipelime in South Sudan and Sudan
- Muglad Basin – Large rift basin in southern Sudan and South Sudan
- PetroDar – Sudanese fossil fuel consortium
