= Giad =

City in Sudan

Giad, more formally Giad Industrial City, is an industrial city located 50 miles south of Khartoum in Sudan. It is owned and operated by the GIAD Industrial Group. The Group was established in 1993.

== See also ==
- Planned city
