= Port Sudan Refinery =

Oil refinery in the city of Port Sudan, Sudan

- Location within Sudan
- Location: Port Sudan, Red Sea, Sudan; 19.598715°N 37.226296°E

Refinery details
- Owner: Port Sudan Petroleum Refinery Limited
- Opened: 1964
- Capacity: 21,700 barrels per day (3,450 m^{3}/d)
- No. of employees: 184

The Port Sudan Refinery is an oil refinery located in the city of Port Sudan, Sudan, on the shores of the Red Sea. The refinery has been de-commissioned and is no longer in service, as it cannot process Sudanese crude oil.
