= Unity oilfield =

Oilfield in Rubkona, South Sudan

Unity oil field
- Location within South Sudan
- Country: South Sudan
- Offshore/onshore: Onshore
- Coordinates: 9°28′39.37″N 29°40′28.67″E

Field history
- Discovery: 1982

The Unity oilfield is a major oilfield in Chotjiok at Rotriak Boma, Budang Payam, northern territory of Rubkona County, Unity State, South Sudan. It lies to the North of the state capital Bentiu.

The oil field, and the Heglig field further north, were discovered by Chevron Corporation in 1982, and it was to become one of the most productive fields in Sudan. Chevron spent almost $880 million in exploration, but suspended operations soon after the Second Sudanese Civil War (1983–2005) began. The trigger was the killing, in 1984, of three Chevron workers by Anyanya II rebels. Chevron demanded a special oilfield protection force in addition to the army. Dissatisfied with security, by 1988, Chevron had closed its operations in Unity province.

Oil production in Unity State was halted in 2013 following the outbreak of the civil war, which badly damaged the country's oil infrastructure.

As of January 2019, South Sudan resumed production at the oilfield, and it was producing 15,000 barrels per day.

It has an airstrip near which the 2025 Light Air Services Beechcraft 1900 crash occurred on 29 January 2025, killing 20 of 21 persons on board.
