= Architecture of Sudan =

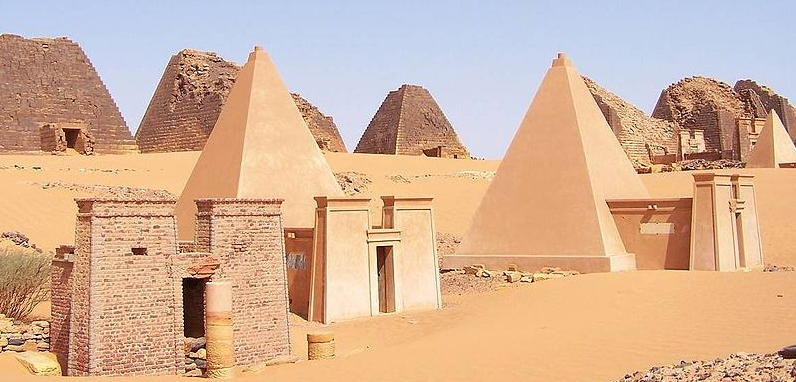
Nubian pyramids of Meroë

The architecture of Sudan mirrors the geographical, ethnic and cultural diversity of the country and its historical periods. The lifestyles and material culture expressed in human settlements, their architecture and economic activities have been shaped by different regional and environmental conditions. In its long documented history, Sudan has been a land of changing and diverse forms of human civilization with important influences from foreign cultures. (Note: In the article on the cultural life in Sudan, the Encyclopædia Britannica writes: "The key to an understanding of contemporary Sudanese culture is diversity. Each major ethnic group and historical region has its own special forms of cultural expression. (...) Because of Sudan's great cultural diversity, it is difficult to classify the traditional cultures of the various peoples. Sudan's traditional societies have diverse linguistic, ethnic, social, cultural, and religious characteristics. And, although improved communications, increased social and economic mobility, and the spread of a money economy have led to a general loosening of the social ties, customs, relationships, and modes of organization in traditional cultures, much from the past still remains intact." Source: "Sudan - Cultural life". Encyclopedia Britannica.)

The earliest known architectural structures and urbanization go back to the eighth millennium BCE. Cultural relations with Sudan's northern neighbour of Ancient Egypt, with which it shared long historical periods of mutual influence, brought about both Egyptian as well as distinctly Nubian settlements with temples and pyramids that emerged in the Kingdom of Kush and its last capital of Meroë.

From around 500 CE until circa 1500 CE, Christian kingdoms were thriving in Upper Nubia and southwards along the Nile. They built important cities, known by their flourishing culture, with monasteries, palaces and cities with fortifications and cathedrals, showing influences of Coptic and Byzantine cultures from Egypt and the eastern Mediterranean.

Following the growing influence of Arab Muslim migrants from the 7th century onwards, the Christian kingdom of Makuria established the Baqt, a treaty with the Muslim rulers of Egypt allowing Muslims to freely trade and travel. This bought about the first establishment of mosques and cemeteries in Upper Nubia, documented from 1317 CE onwards. From about 1500 CE and up to the early 19th century, the Muslim Sultanates of the Funji and of Darfur established new kingdoms in the southern and western parts of Sudan. Prosperous cities such as Sennar or Al Fashir had buildings for administration and personal housing, agriculture and crafts, worship and trade, - including the slave trade.

Located on the southern bank of the Blue Nile, the city of Khartoum developed as the centre of the Turkish-Egyptian state, but was largely destroyed by the Mahdi's followers in 1885, who established their capital in Omdurman across the White Nile. In the early 1900s, Khartoum, was rebuilt by the British administration under Lord Kitchener, following standards of a modern European city. In 2021, greater Khartoum is a metropolis with an estimated population of almost six million people, consisting of Khartoum proper, linked by bridges across the Blue and White Nile with the cities of Khartoum North and Omdurman to the West.

The rural landscape of Sudan is still largely characterized by traditional African architecture, but also has undergone important changes in the development of settlements, infrastructure and corresponding architecture during the 19th and 20th centuries.

== Early historical periods ==
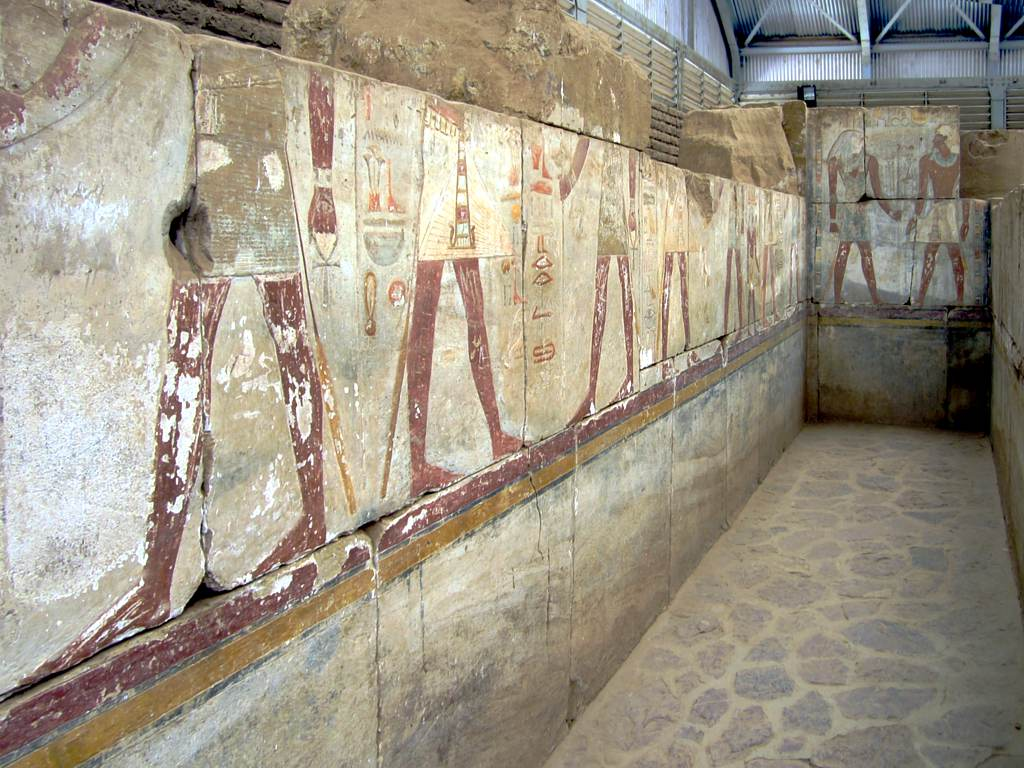
Walls of the Horus temple of Buhen in the National Museum of Sudan

=== Prehistory ===
By the eighth millennium BCE, people of a Neolithic culture had settled into a sedentary way of life in the Nile valley in fortified mud-brick villages, where they supplemented hunting and fishing on the Nile with grain harvesting and cattle herding.

In eastern Sudan, the Butana Group appeared around 4000 BCE. Not much is known about settlement patterns, but some sites are almost 10 hectare large, indicating longer occupations. The people of the Butana Group lived in small, round huts. Not many cemeteries are known, but people were most often buried in a contracted position.

=== Settlements of Ancient Egypt in Nubia ===
The city of Buhen was an ancient Egyptian settlement near today's city of Wadi Halfa in Sudan's Northern State. It is known for its large fortress, probably constructed during the rule of Senusret III around 1860 BCE (12th Dynasty). Its fortifications included a moat three meters deep, drawbridges, bastions, buttresses, ramparts, battlements, loopholes, and a catapult. The outer wall included an area between the two walls pierced with a double row of arrow loops, allowing both standing and kneeling archers to fire at the same time. In 1962, an archaeological expedition of Buhen revealed elements like slags from the smelting process that belonged to an ancient copper factory. Buhen also had a temple of Horus, built by Hatshepsut. Walls of this temple, along with architectural elements from the Semna cataract and other locations were re-erected in the museum garden of the National Museum of Sudan prior to the flooding of Lake Nasser.

=== The Kingdom of Kush ===
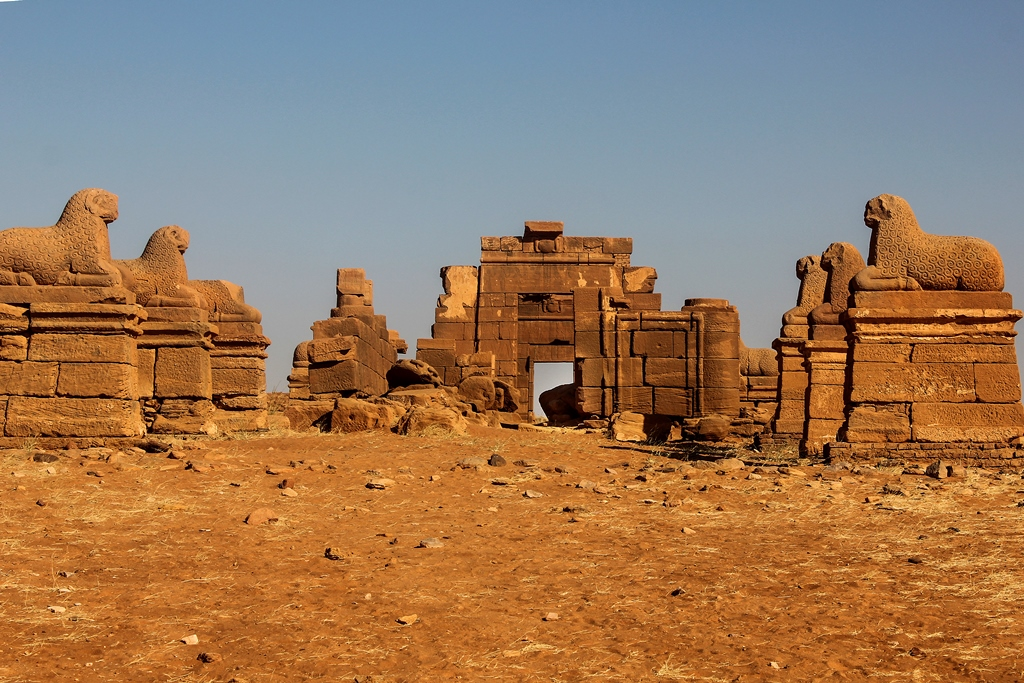
Amun temple at Naqa

During the Kingdom of Kush (about 950 BCE – CE 350), when the monarchs of Kush ruled their northern neighbour Egypt as pharaos for over a century and a strong Egyptian influence was present in Nubian culture, important cities with temples were built, such as the city of Naqa with its temples dedicated to ancient deities Amun and Apedemak. Another building in the same place is a small temple called The Roman Kiosk with indigenous Nubian as well as Hellenistic elements.

Further examples of ancient Nubian architecture are rock-cut temples, big mudbrick buildings with temples called deffufa, graves with stoned walls or dwellings made of mudbricks, wood and stone floors, palaces and well laid-out roads. Archaeological campaigns have brought to light the remnants of Nubian cities, such as the Royal City of Meroë, where the so-called 'Roman baths', were characterised as "an outstanding example of cultural transfer between the African kingdom and the Greco-Roman culture of the Mediterranean." Among Sudan's World Heritage Sites, the Nubian pyramids in Meroë are probably the best known architectural remnants of this historical period.

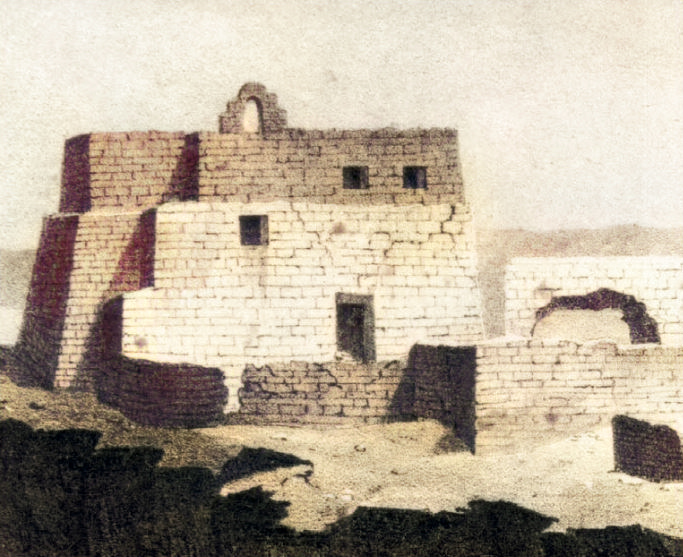
The 9th century Throne Hall of Dongola, as pictured in 1821

=== Medieval Nubia ===
In medieval Nubia (c. 500–1500 CE), the inhabitants of the Christian kingdoms Makuria, Nobadia, and Alodia built distinct forms of architecture in their cities, such as the Faras Cathedral with elaborate friezes and wall paintings, the Great Monastery of St Anthony or the Throne Hall of the Makurian kings, a massive defence-like building, in Old Dongola. Most of these buildings were excavated and documented, before they were submerged in the waters of Lake Nasser in the 1960s and 70s.

=== Arrival of Islam and Arabization ===
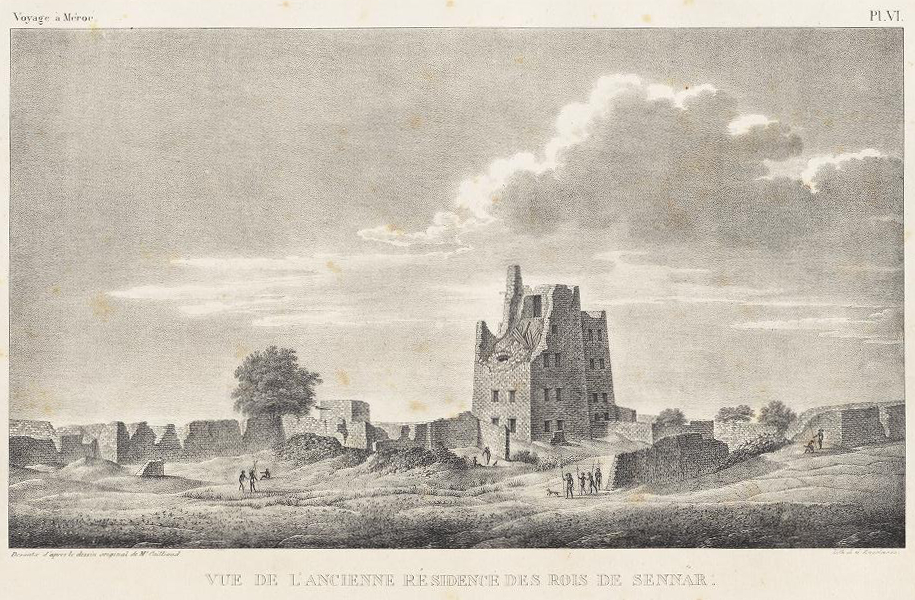
The ruined palace of Sennar, drawing by Frédéric Cailliaud, 1821

In the 16th and 17th centuries, Islamic kingdoms were established in the southern and western parts of Sudan – the Funj Sultanate with its capital in Sennar and the Sultanate of Darfur with Al-Fashir. The changes in religion and society at large marked a long period of gradual Islamization and Arabization in Sudan. These sultanates and their societies existed until the Sudan was conquered through the Ottoman Egyptian invasion in 1820, and, in the case of Darfur, even until 1916.

Major cultural changes of this period were the adoption by growing numbers of people of the Islamic religion and the use of the Arabic language, with the building of mosques and Islamic schools as elements of social life. Other cultural developments were reported by foreign visitors such as Frédéric Cailliaud and included the architecture of towns and buildings.

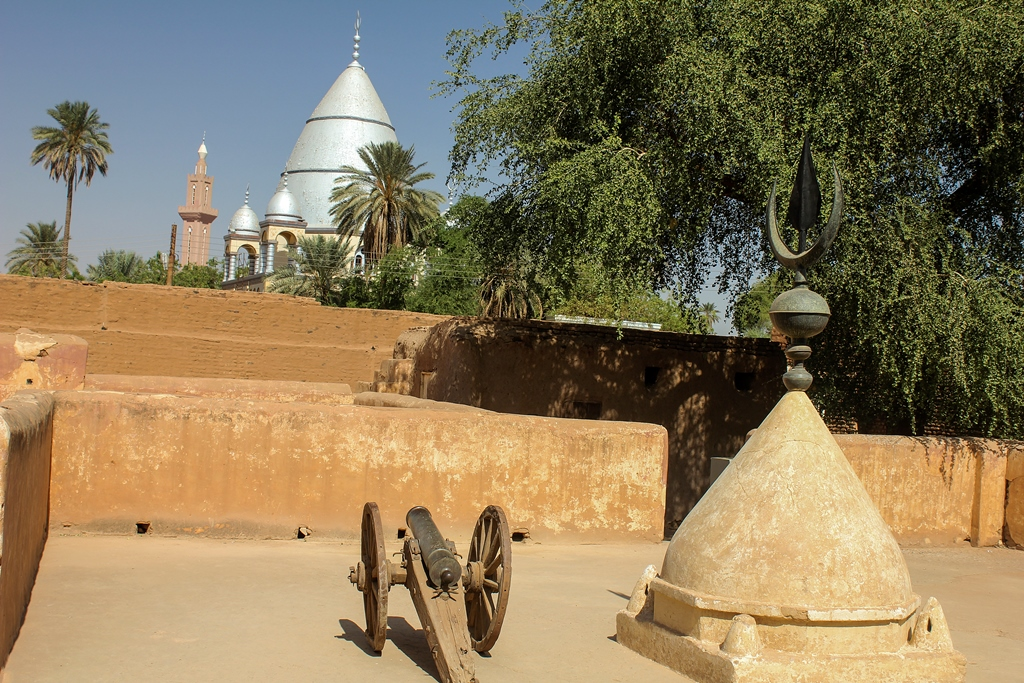
View from the Khalifa House towards the tomb of the Mahdi

During the Turkish-Egyptian rule (1821–1885), Turks, Egyptians, British and other foreign inhabitants of Khartoum expanded the city from a military encampment to a regional centre with hundreds of brick-built houses, official buildings like the first governor's palace, the mudiriya (government offices) and several foreign consulates. In 1829, the first mosque was erected in Khartoum under governor-general Ali Khurshid Agha, who also had a dockyard and new military barracks built.

Following the defeat of General Gordon's troops in 1885, the Mahdist state (1885–1899) built important architectural monuments in Omdurman, the country's capital during this period. Today, the reconstructed tomb of Muhammad Ahmad, known as al-Mahdi, the former residence of his successor Abdallahi ibn Muhammad, now the Khalifa House Museum, as well as the Abdul Qayyum Gate and some remnants of the fortifications, known as Al Tabia, bear witness to the Islamic tradition of Omdurman. Other characteristic buildings include mosques and graves of important religious leaders, such as Sheikh Hamed el Nil. Furthermore, Souk Omdurman is an important traditional market.

== Traditional architecture ==
Traditional homes and other structures of vernacular architecture in large parts of the country have been built using locally available materials, such as cow dung, mudbricks, stones or trees and other plants. The buildings are often embellished with painted ornaments, reflecting the local culture. This type of rectangular or square house is typically constructed by the future inhabitants themselves, relying on helping hands from the community.

The traditional, rectangular or square box-house (bayt jalus) with a flat roof, made of pure dried clay, sun-dried mud, brick or cow-dung plaster (zibala), continues to be the dominant architectural type in Sudan. In its pure form, wooden frames are used only for the roof, windows and doors. It is widespread everywhere, except in the south where the heavy rains make sloping grass roofs essential. The traditional box-house style was seen at its most complete in Omdurman, the city built by the khalifa ῾Abdallahi (r. 1885–98) in 1885, which was the country's capital for 13 years.

— The Grove Encyclopedia of Islamic Art and Architecture

In the southern parts of the country, where there is more rainfall and vegetation than in the North, round huts with thatched conical roofs are widespread. These tukul huts are traditionally made of dried mud, grass, stalks and wooden poles. Also, the various (semi-)nomadic peoples who live in Sudan, such as the Beja, Baggara, Rachaida or others have developed mobile camps and often still today live in tents. (Note: Apart from nomads, one has to consider the large numbers of camps for international refugees and Internally displaced persons (IDPs), often living in tents and other transitional shelters. According to the Office of the United Nations High Commissioner for Refugees (UNHCR), by the end of 2014, there were 2.3 million internally displaced people, which represented one of the world's largest internally displaced populations. Source: "Population of Sudan". fanack.com. Archived from the original on 12 April 2021.)

Traditional architecture
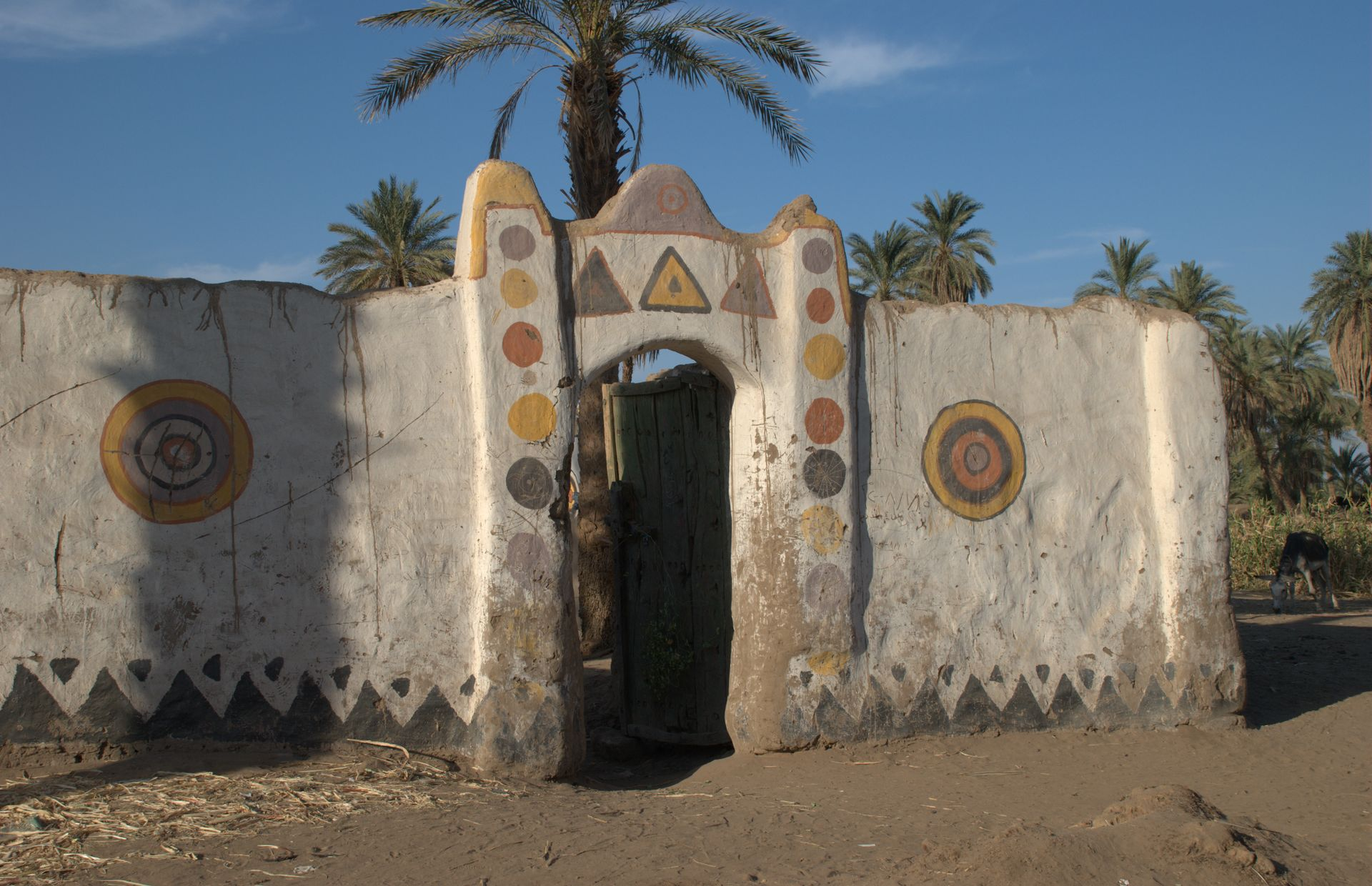
Nubian house in Dongola with traditional wall painting

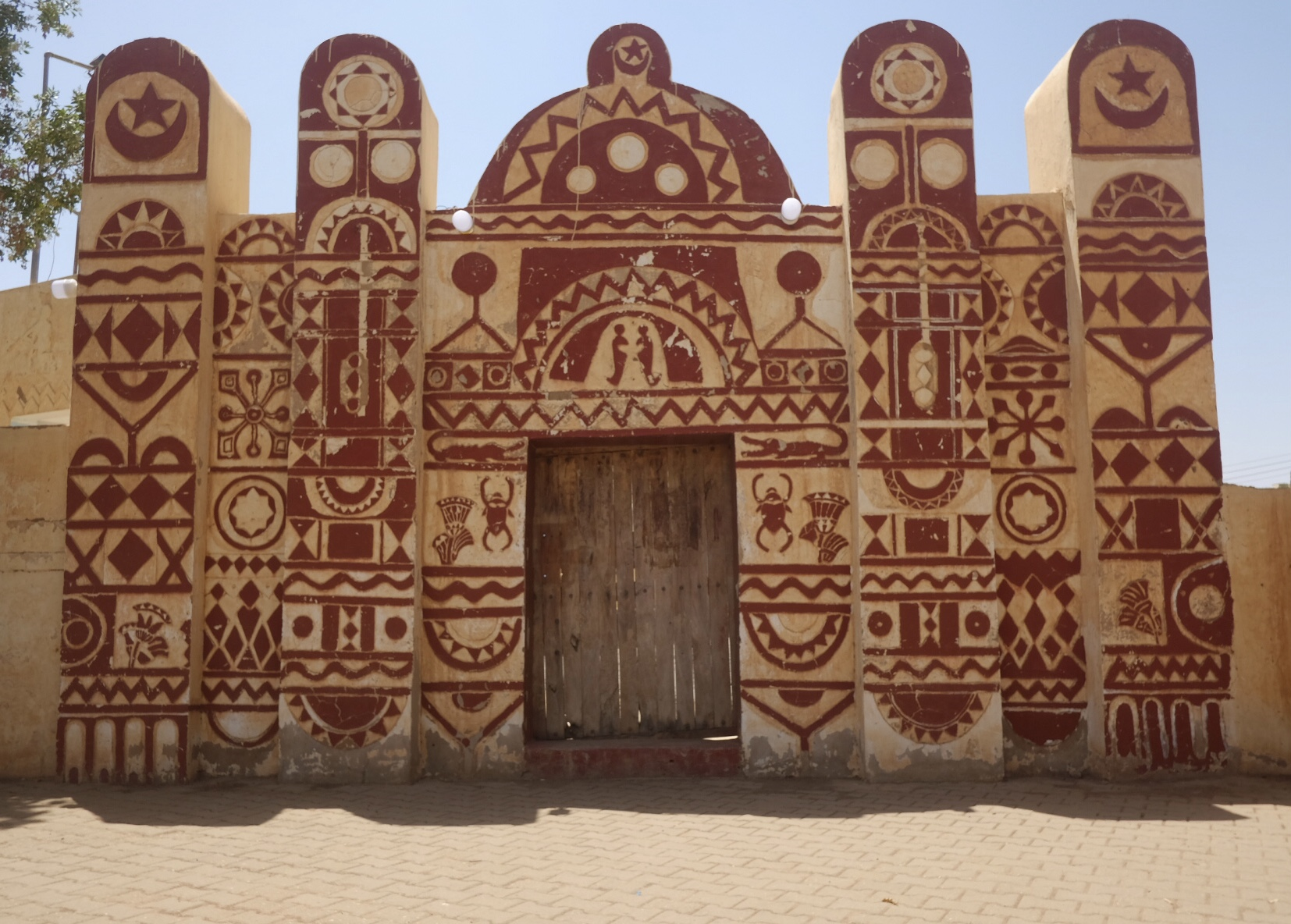
Entrance with wall painting at Nubian Club, Khartoum

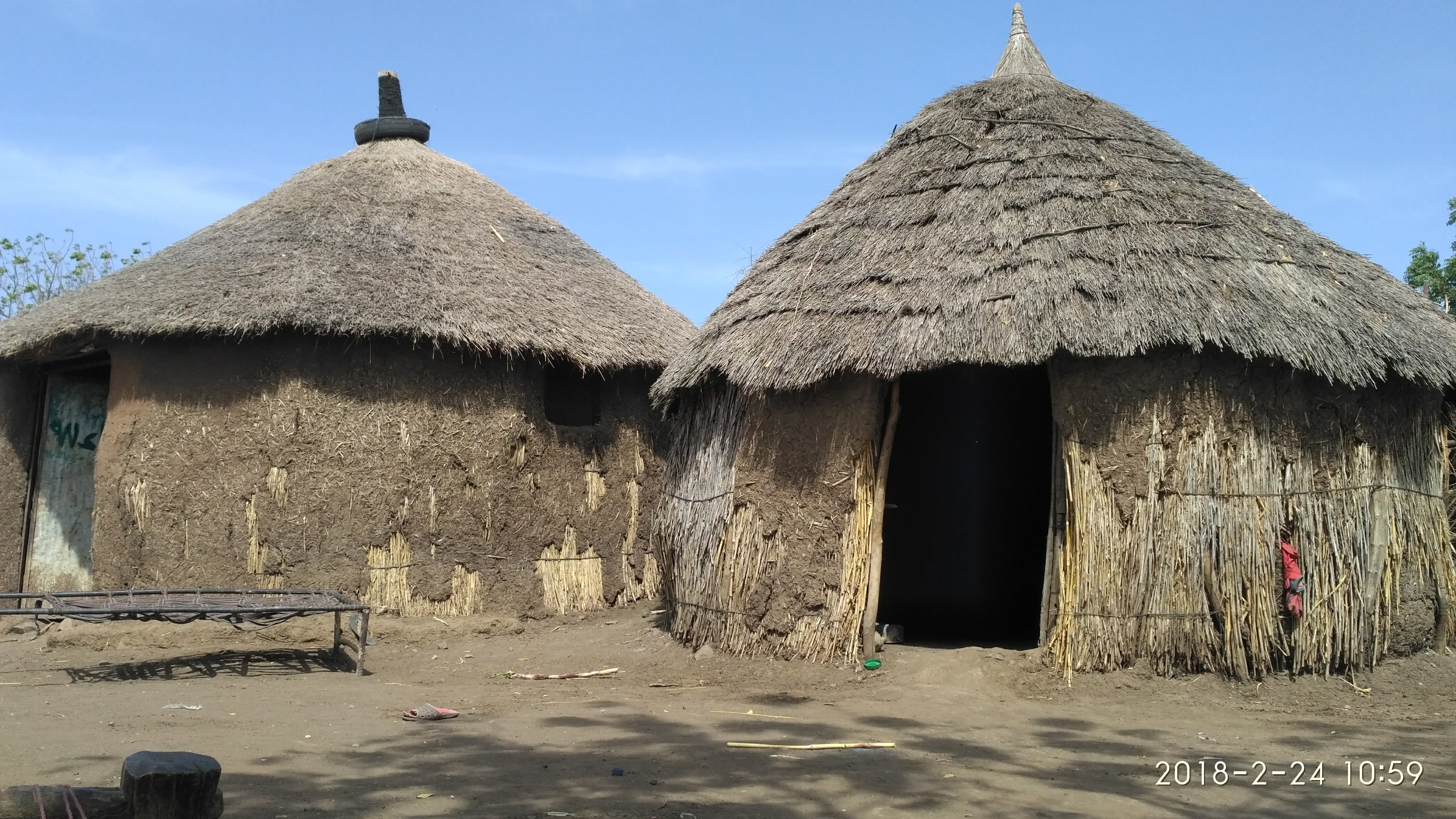
Tukul huts in southern Sudan

=== Turkish architecture in Suakin ===
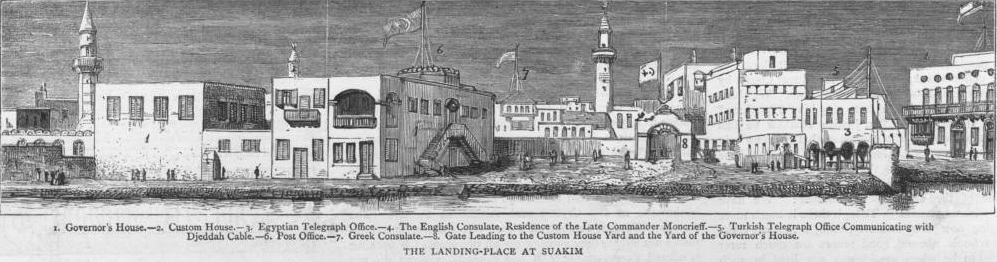
The Landing Place at Suakin, 1871

Long before the Turkish invasion of Sudan in the early 1820s, the city of Suakin on Sudan's Red Sea coast had been developed as an important port and commercial centre by its Turkish and Arab inhabitants. After the construction of Port Sudan as a modern city and harbour in 1909, Suakin fell into disrepair, with only some ruins of its former buildings left. In his book on The Coral Buildings of Suakin, Jean-Pierre Greenlaw, a British art teacher, who had set up the School of Design in Khartoum, documented the former state of the town and gave the following description: (Note: In his review of Greenlaw's book, G. King wrote: "Hijazi Islamic Architectural Character (HIAC) is a style that encompasses architectural features made popular by the Ottoman Empire over a period of 300 years beginning in the 16th century. As the Ottoman Empire's span of influence expanded across the Red Sea coastal region so did the replication of the HIAC in various coastal cities (Greenlaw 1995). The HIAC can be seen in the ornamentation of major city buildings such as mosques and on the homes of wealthy citizens scattered throughout these coastal cities. HIAC style ornamentation includes various doors, window types, woodwork designs, trimmings, and the creative use of internal and external spaces." Source: King, G. (June 1996). "Jean-Pierre Greenlaw: The coral buildings of Suakin: Islamic architecture, planning, design and domestic arrangements in a Red Sea port. 132 pp. London: Kegan Paul International, 1994". Bulletin of the School of Oriental and African Studies, University of London. 59. doi:10.1017/S0041977X00031669. S2CID 128886056 – via www.researchgate.net.)

Built between the 16th and the 20th centuries, Suakin was a jewel-like example of the special sort of architecture which evolved to suit the conditions around the coasts of the Red Sea. The style consisted of two- or three-storeyed houses with vertical walls pierced by many-shuttered windows and characteristic mashrabiyas, and with roof-terraces (kharjahs) on which to sleep in the welcome coolness of the moon- or star-lit evenings. The outside walls of the buildings were white-washed, which set off the mashrabiyas and carved wooden doors which were surmounted by carved stone door-hoods. Its situation on a flat island in a lagoon provided a setting which gave it a unique beauty.

— Jean-Pierre Greenlaw, The coral buildings of Suakin: Islamic architecture, planning, design and domestic arrangements in a Red Sea port

Other buildings bearing witness to Turkish cultural influence in Sudan are the graves of Ottoman rulers with characteristic qubba domes in today's Baladiya Street in Khartoum.

== Anglo-Egyptian rule in the 20th century ==
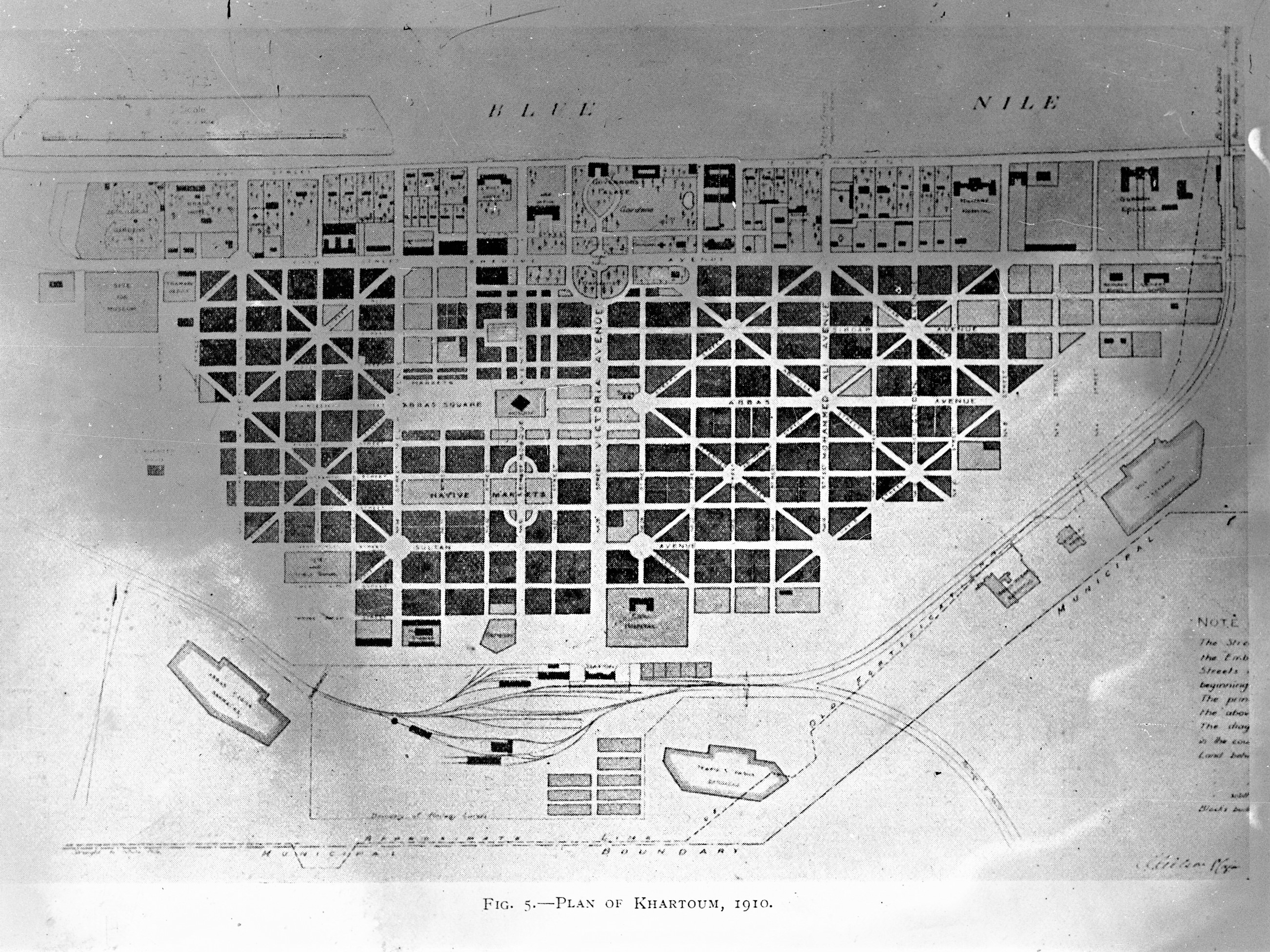
Plan of Khartoum, 1910

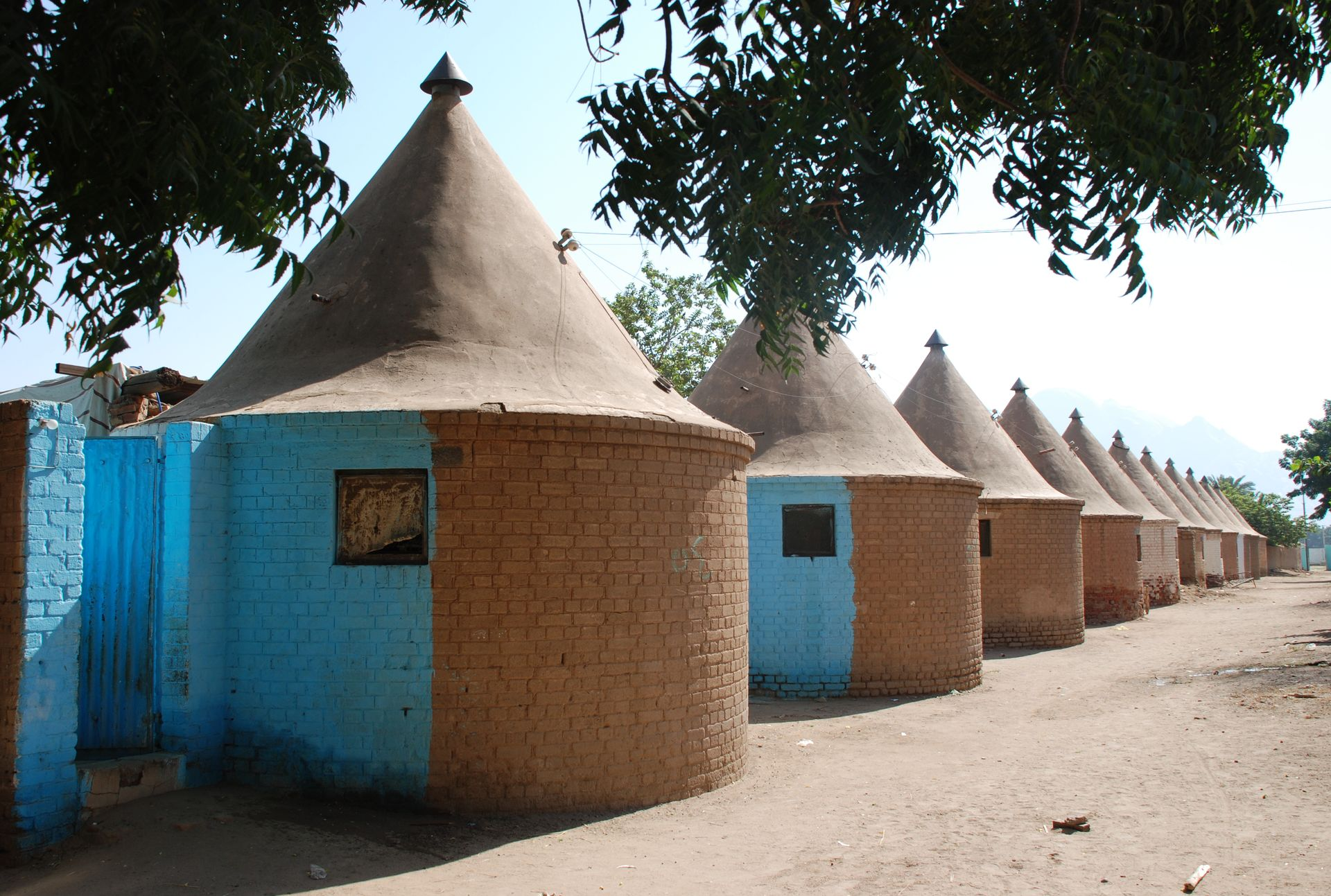
Round living quarters built for railway workers in Sikka Hadid neighbourhood, Kassala

After the British Imperial Army under Lord Kitchener had defeated the Mahdist State with its capital in Omdurman in 1898, the urban district of downtown Khartoum was developed according to colonial rules of space zoning in a series of Union Jack patterns. British urban planner William Mclean designed the first master plan for Khartoum, and it was once called "the jewel in the crown" of British colonies in Africa.

New buildings in European styles were built between 1900 and 1912, such as the Government House (now the President's Palace) and other government buildings along Nile Street. Important buildings for education included the Gordon Memorial College, which later became the main building of today's University of Khartoum, its School of Medicine and the Catholic Comboni College. In 1902, the first school for girls was opened, which still exists as Unity High School.

The al-Kabir mosque for Friday prayers in Khartoum, built in Egyptian style, was inaugurated, when Khedive Abbas Pasha Helmy visited Sudan on 4 December 1901. The former Anglican All Saints cathedral (now Republican Palace Museum) and the Catholic St. Matthew's cathedral were both completed around 1910 in neo-Romanesque style. In 1926, the Ohel Shlomo synagogue was built in Sephardic style on former Victoria Avenue, now Al-Qasr Street, for the Jewish community of greater Khartoum.

For visitors, Khartoum also offered accommodation in several hotels, such as the Gordon Hotel and later, the Acropole hotel, run since 1952 by Greek owners. Other urban structures were marketplaces, such as Souq al-Arabi, banks and offices, as well as the infrastructure for railway services and the first bridges spanning the Nile. (The Blue Nile Bridge opened in 1909 and Omdurman Bridge in 1926.) In Khartoum North, a large prison, today called Kobar prison and still in use, was established in 1903 and gave its name to the adjacent neighbourhood. Even though these changes were made by and for foreigners and excluded most Sudanese inhabitants, the newly independent Republic of Sudan "inherited a fairly efficient system of education, public administration, transportation, recreation and other amenities." (Note: "With the advent of the Anglo-Egyptian condominium, Kitchener reinstated Khartoum in 1898 and ordered a proper colonial plan and rebuilding the city in one year. Work proceeded diligently and Khartoum started transforming into one of the most beautiful cities of Africa, (...) Khartoum was laid out with proper colonial rules of space zoning, as to segregation of barracks, administration and housing of ranking categories, market places, etc. What is relevant here is that it was a very well thought of and a well executed plan with much consideration given to the ecology. Trees were part and parcel of the plan from the beginning and for that purpose, tens of thousands of seedlings were brought from India and perhaps Kenya and other tropical places, the first plant nursery was established and a solution for irrigation was innovated. Khartoum, in about ten years perhaps, was fully grown into a city with wide greened and asphalted roads, electricity and water networks and a properly designed surface drainage system, tramway and a rail line and a bridge over the Blue Nile, an airdrome, a city with gardens in houses and government buildings, landscaped open spaces and green beds along roads in addition to a flood control embankment along the Blue Nile." Source: Elkheir, Osman, The Urban Environment of Khartoum)

Provincial towns and cities like Kassala, El-Gadarif, El Obeid, Port Sudan, Shendi, Atbara, or Wad Madani also underwent important changes necessary for colonial rule, with modern buildings, long-distance roads and other infrastructure, such as a railway system linking the major economic centres. (Note: For an overview of the railway in 1952, see "Sudan Railways," in Railroad Magazine October 1952, at pp. 36-47. The article is illustrated with black and white photos of what was then a flourishing railroad.)

Colonial buildings in Khartoum
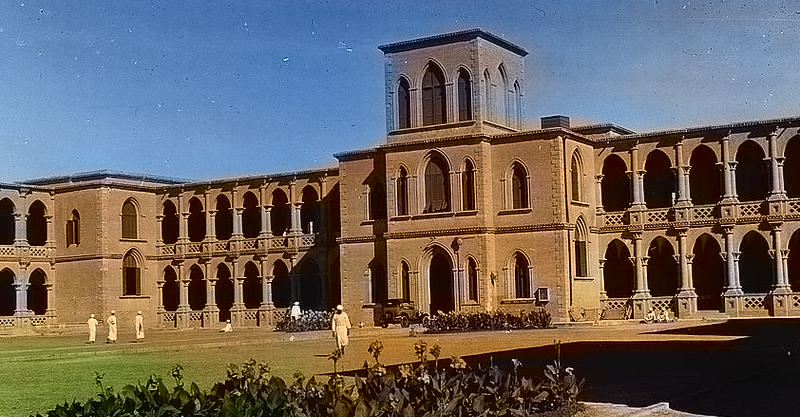
Gordon Memorial College founded in 1902

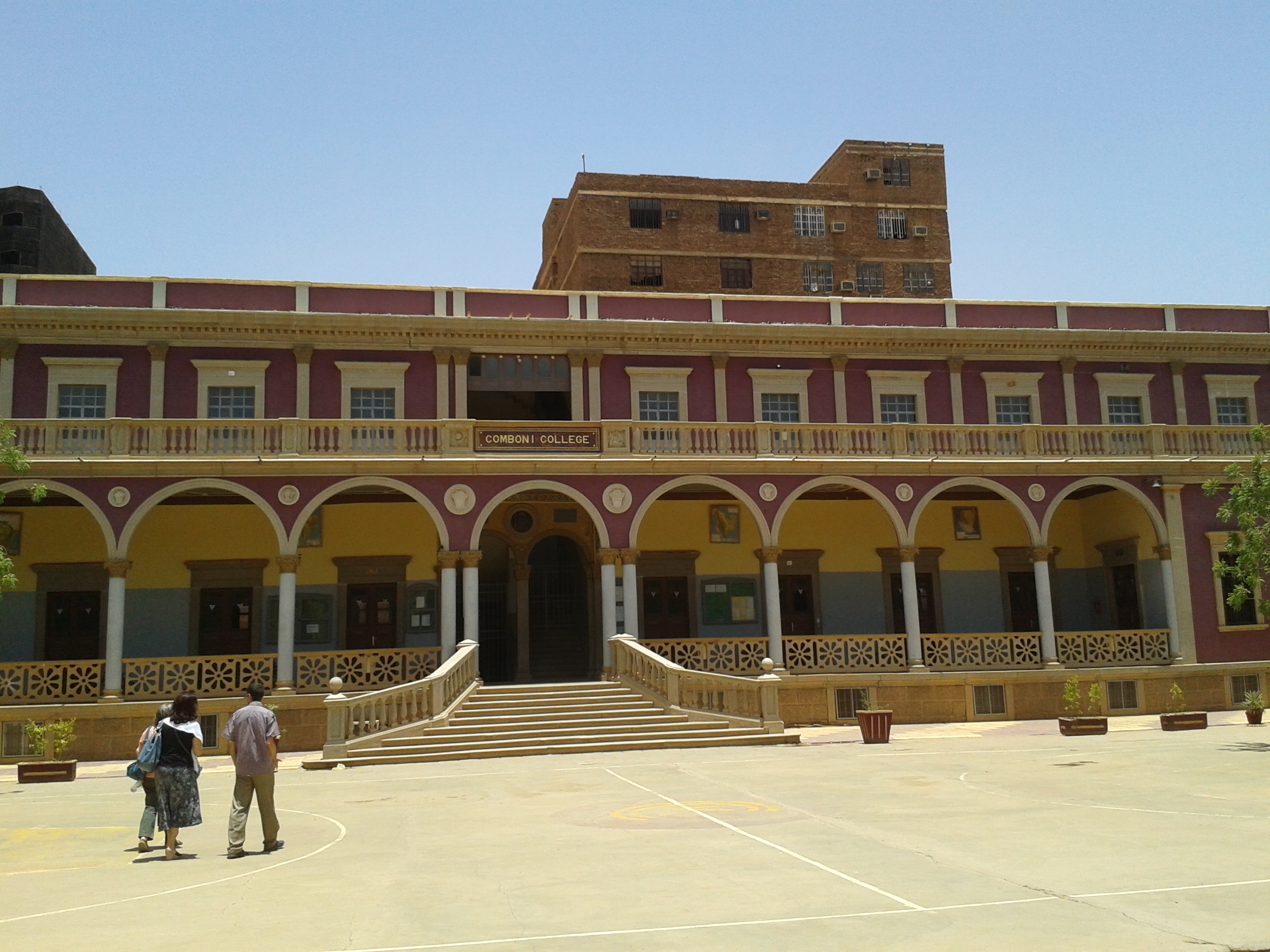
Comboni College with arcades in Italian style, founded in 1930

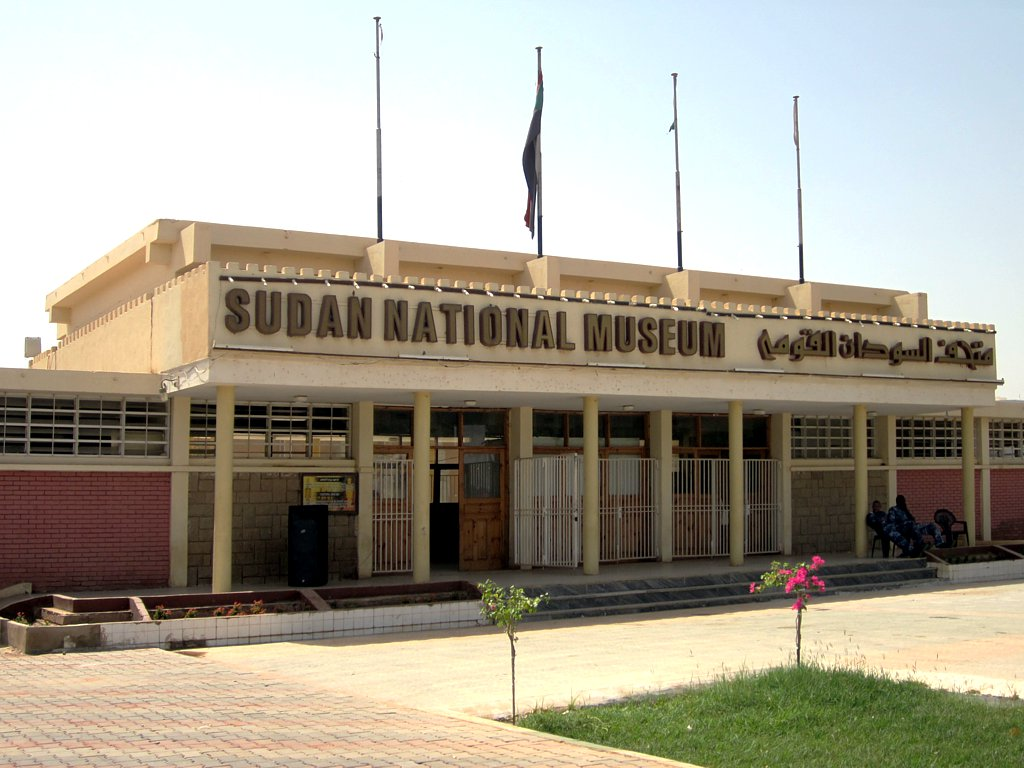
National Museum of Sudan, built in 1955

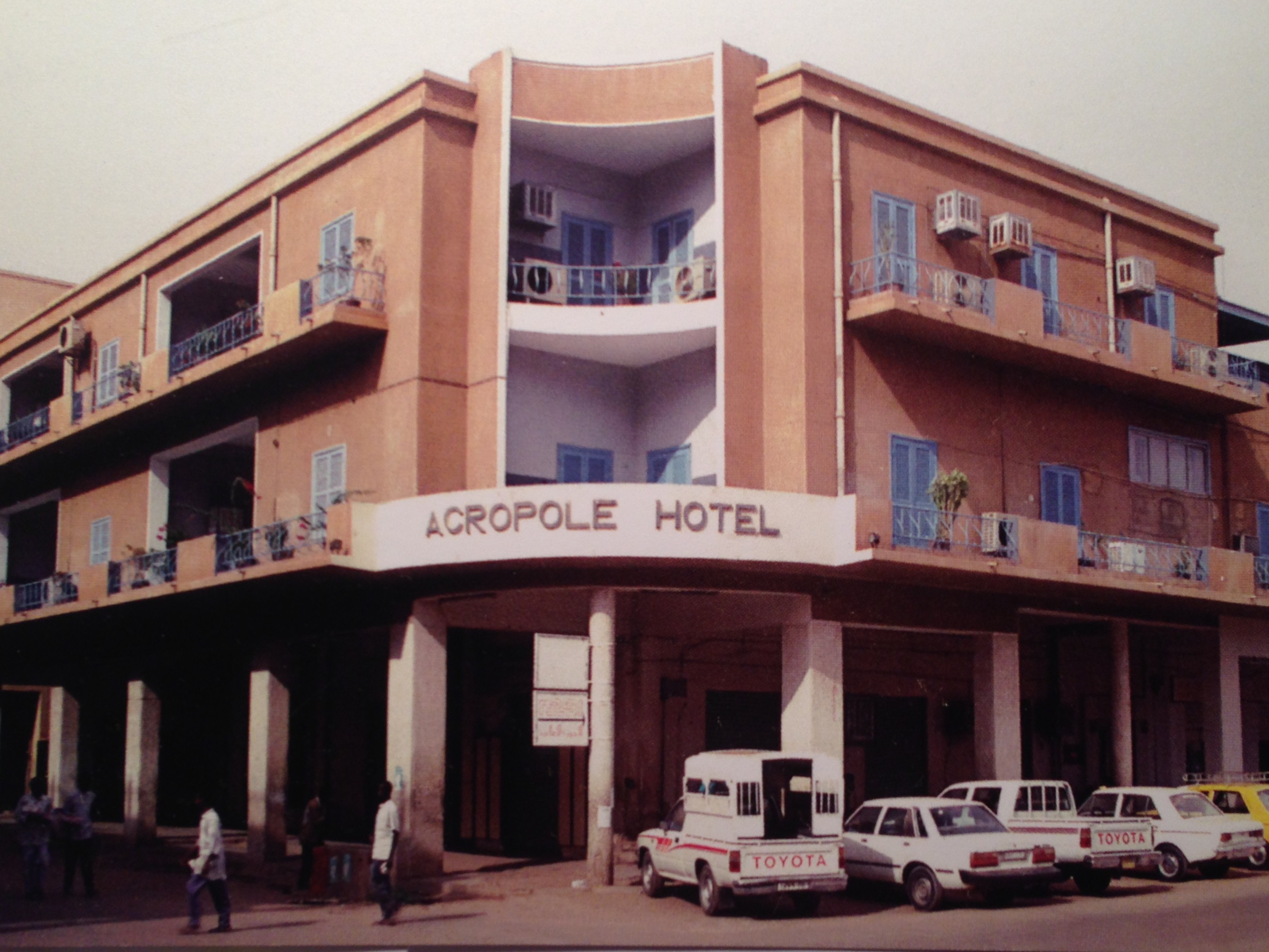
Acropole Hotel near Suq al-Arabi market, opened 1952

== Modern architecture after independence ==
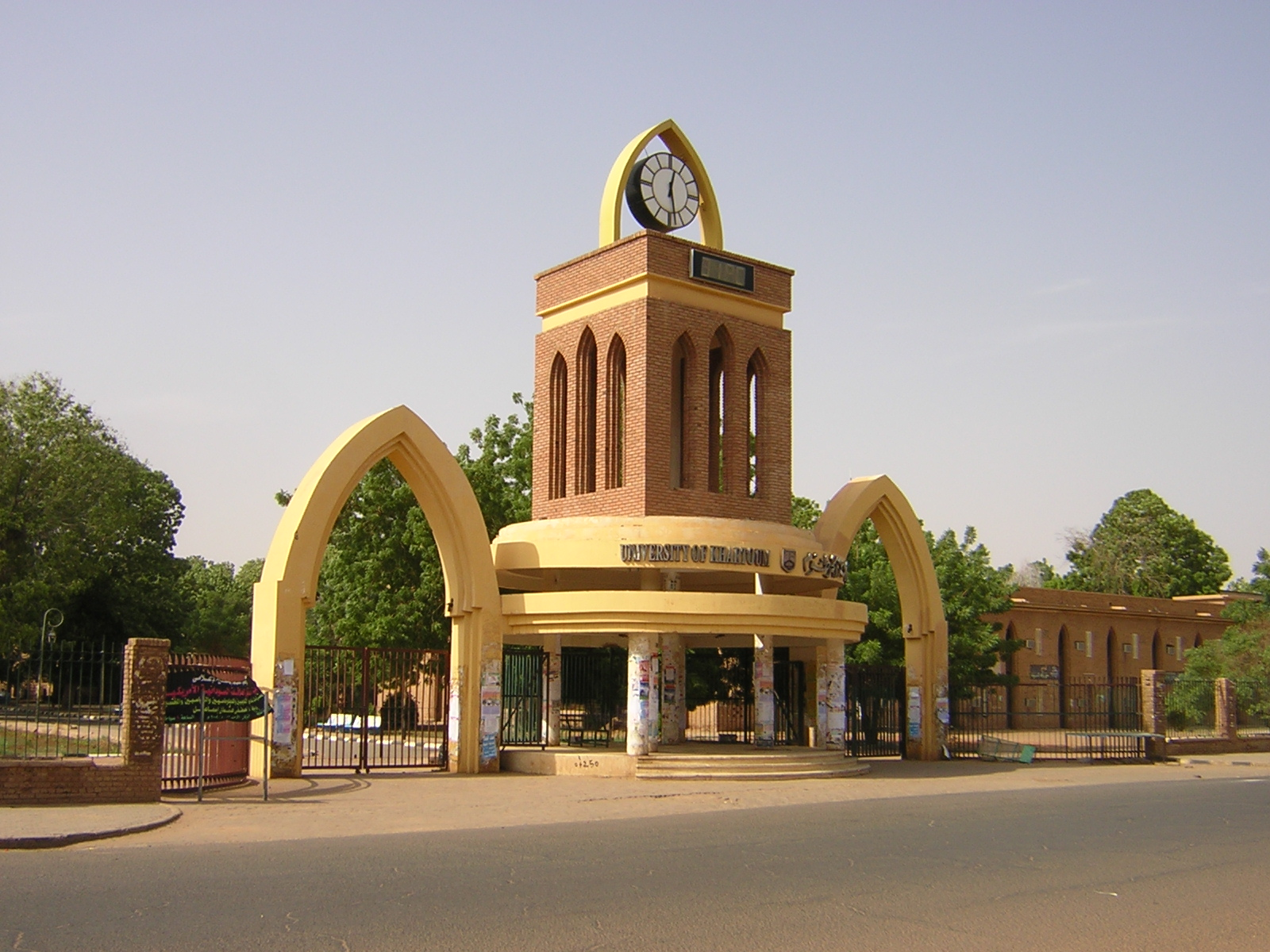
Main entrance to University of Khartoum

In the first years after independence, new buildings, for example the Examination Hall of the University of Khartoum, were designed by foreign architects, such as Peter Muller, George Stefanidis, Alick Potter and Miles Danbi. A Faculty of Architecture was opened at the University of Khartoum in 1957, with Alick Potter as first Head of Department and professor of architecture.

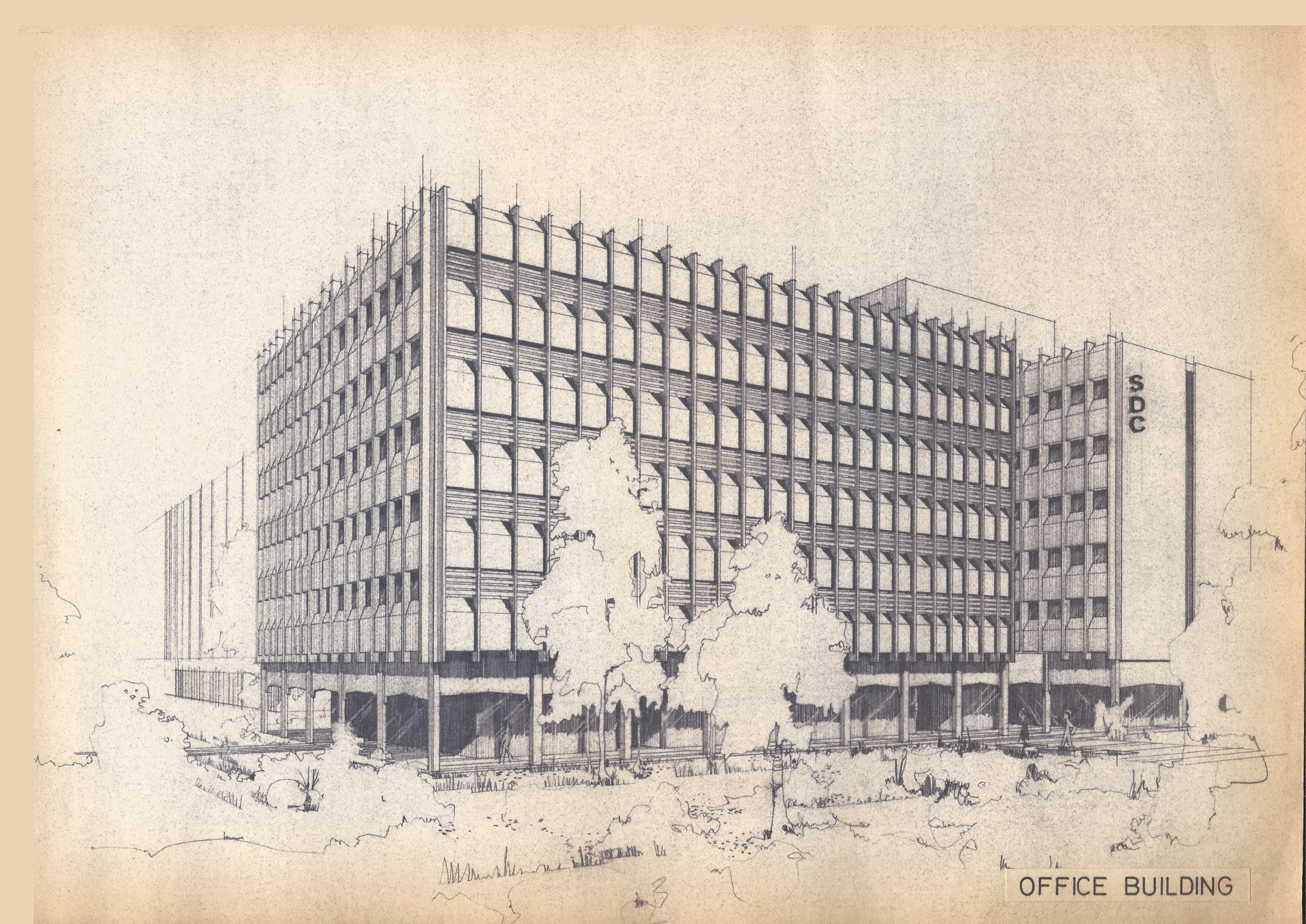
Sudan Development Corporation, Khartoum, designed by Abdel-Moneim Mustafa

From the 1960s onwards, Sudanese architects Abdel Moneim Mustafa and Hamid El Khawad, who had returned from their studies in the United Kingdom, designed numerous contemporary Sudanese projects. These include the University of Khartoum's Lecture Theatre, buildings for the Department of Biochemistry - Faculty of Agriculture, as well as the Structures Laboratory of the Faculty of Engineering and Architecture.

Other buildings by Abdel Moneim Mustafa are the headquarters for the Arab Bank for Economic Development in Africa, El-Ikhwa commercial building, El-Turabi primary school and apartment buildings in Khartoum's central business district. Among the first graduates of the Faculty of Architecture were Omer Al Agraa and El Amin Mudather, who designed the university's building for the Faculty of Veterinary Medicine.

Peter Muller, an Austrian architect, designed the new Polytechnic complex, which later became the Sudan University of Science and Technology. The campus includes several multi-storey teaching blocks, a library, workshops, hostels, staff houses, and a stadium. He also designed the Bata Shoe factory in the industrial area of Khartoum North.

In Omdurman, the Al-Nilin Mosque (Mosque of the two Niles), with its distinct dome and devoid of supporting pillars inside, located at the confluence of the White and Blue Nile, was inaugurated in the mid-1970s. Close to this, the National Assembly building was designed in the style of brutalist architecture, and "reminiscent of classical temple architecture", by Romanian architect Cezar Lăzărescu, and completed in 1978. As one of several universities in Omdurman, the campus of Ahfad University for Women was built in 1966.

== Contemporary architecture in the 21st century ==
In the early 21st century, major new buildings in Khartoum were the 5-star Corinthia Hotel, opened in 2009 and financed by the Libyan government, or the Telecommunications Tower, also of 2009. El Mek Nimr Bridge, finished in 2007, spans the Blue Nile between downtown Khartoum and Khartoum North, and Tuti Bridge is considered to be the first suspension bridge in Sudan.

The Salam Centre for Cardiac Surgery, designed by an Italian company, was completed in 2010 and won the 2013 Aga Khan Award for Architecture. The same year, the Greater Nile Petroleum Oil Company Tower was built by a company based in Abu Dhabi. The main building of the Open University of Sudan, opened in 2004 in the Khartoum suburb of Arkaweet, is another example of contemporary architecture in the capital.

21st-century buildings in Khartoum
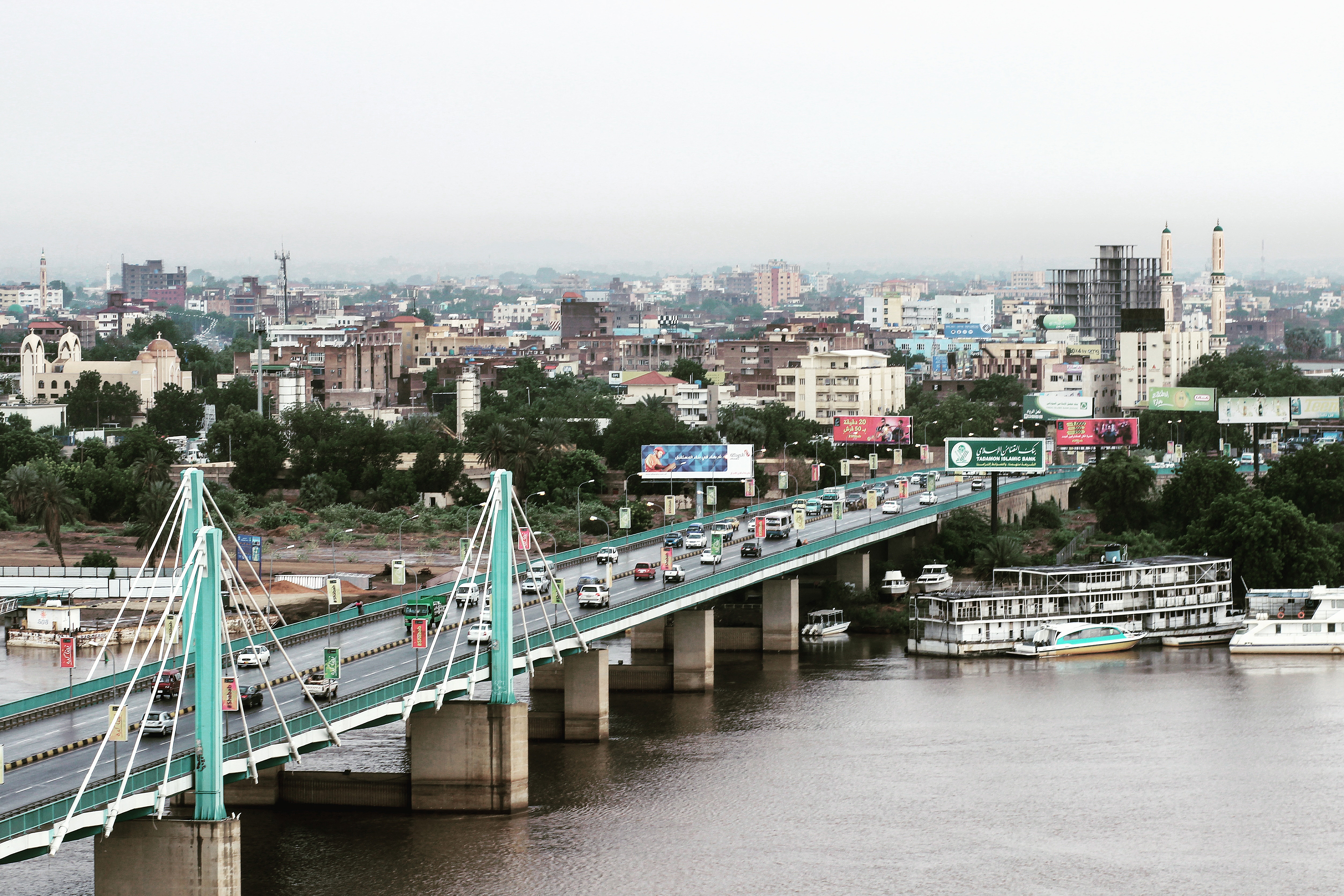
El Mek Nimr Bridge

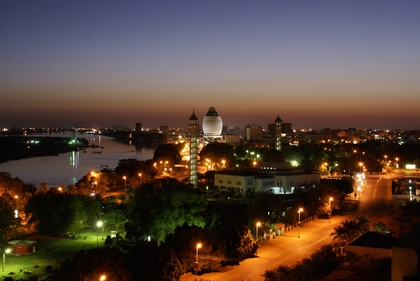
View of Khartoum with Corinthia Hotel and the Blue Nile

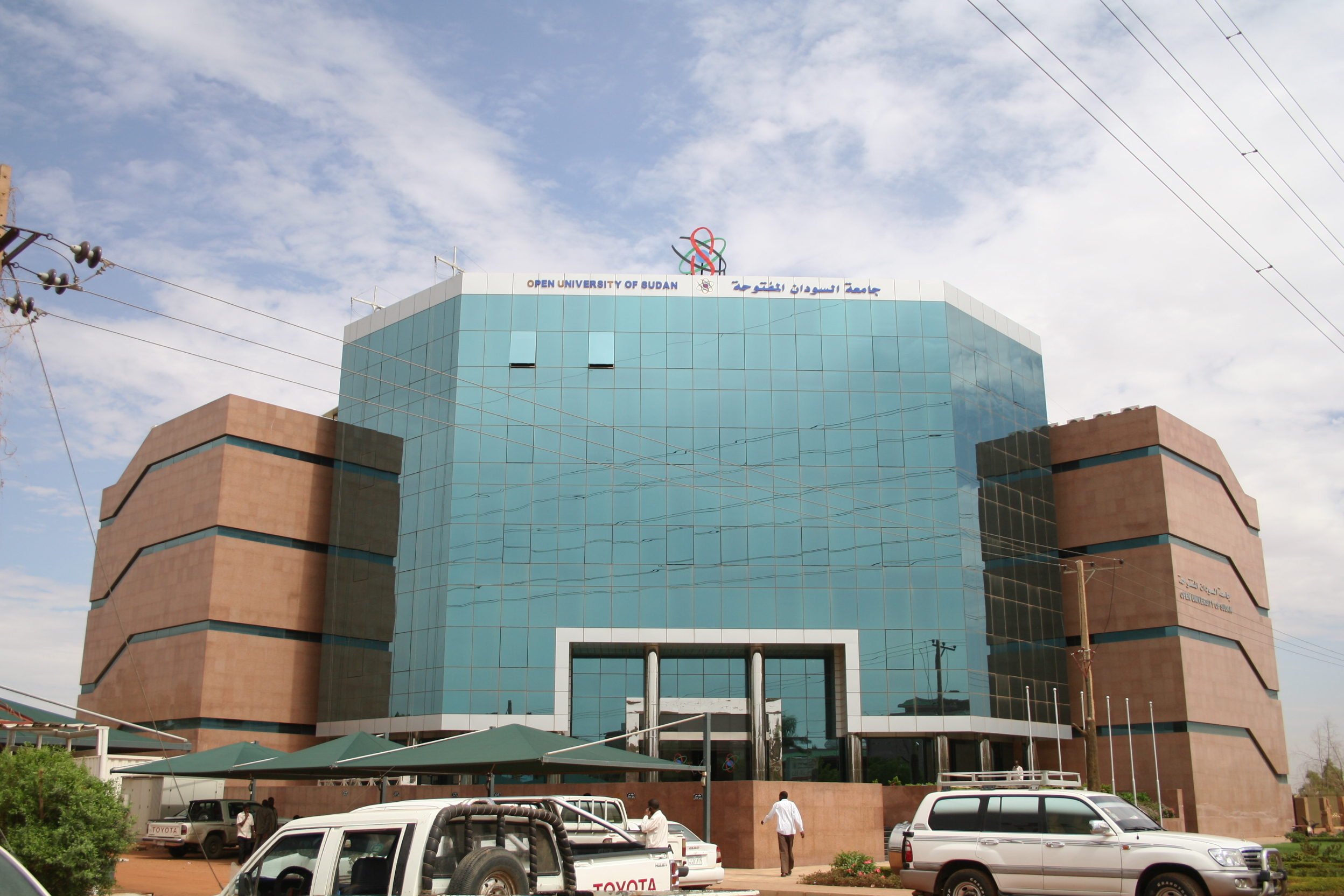
Open University of Sudan

== See also ==
- List of palaces and fortifications in Sudan
- History of Sudan
- Visual arts of Sudan
- Timeline of Khartoum

== Bibliography ==
- Ahmad, Adil Mustafa (2000). "Khartoum blues: the 'deplanning' and decline of a capital city". Habitat International. Vol. 24, no. 3. pp. 309–325. doi:10.1016/S0197-3975(99)00046-6.
- Bani, Maha Omer; Saeed, Tallal Abdalbasit (2005). "Critical regionalism: studies on contemporary residential architecture of Khartoum - Sudan".
- Bashir, Fathi (2007). Modern Architecture in Khartoum 1950-1990. pp. 589–602. doi:10.13140/2.1.4402.9125. ISBN 978-9957-8602-2-6.
- Jonathan M. Bloom, Sheila S. Blair (eds.) "Sudan, Democratic Republic of the." In The Grove encyclopedia of Islamic art and architecture. Oxford Islamic Studies Online. ISBN 978-0-19-530991-1, 978-0-19-537304-2
- Greenlaw, Jean-Pierre (1994) The coral buildings of Suakin: Islamic architecture, planning, design and domestic arrangements in a Red Sea port. 132 pp. London: Kegan Paul International.
- Maillot, M. (2015). The Meroitic Palace and Royal City. Sudan & Nubia, No 19, published by The Sudan Archaeological Research Society. Online publication with many drawings and photographs.
- Osman, Omer S.; Osman, Amira O. S.; Bahreldin, Ibrahim Z. (1 August 2011). "Architecture in Sudan: The Post–Independence Era (1956-1970). Focus on the Work of Abdel Moneim Mustafa". Docomomo Journal (44): 77–80. doi:10.52200/44.A.DQKNX1LV. ISSN 2773-1634.
- Welsby, Derek (2002). The Medieval Kingdoms of Nubia. Pagans, Christians and Muslims along the Middle Nile. The British Museum. ISBN 0-7141-1947-4.
