= African round hut =

African architecture

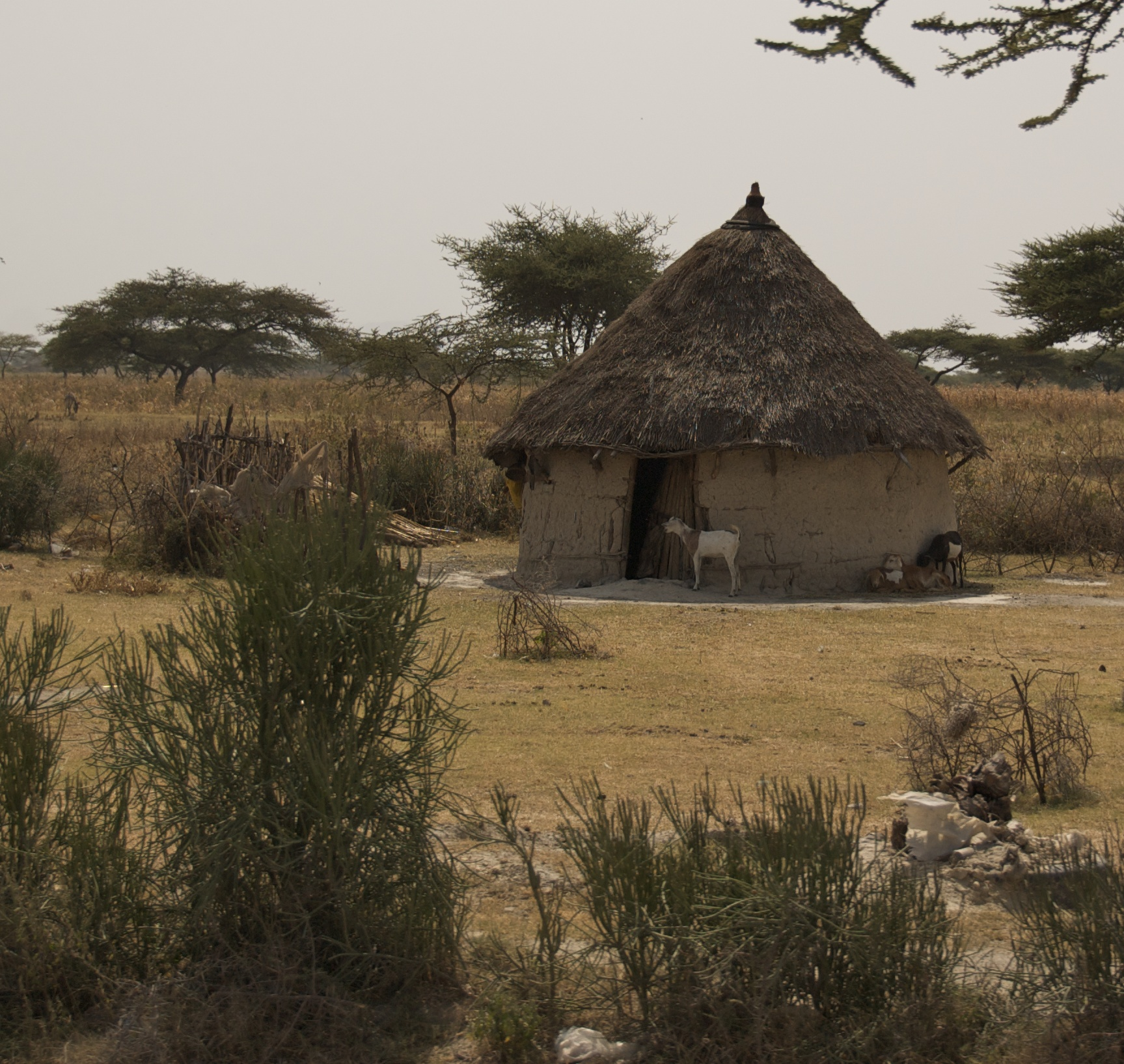
A traditional African hut in Ethiopia

The African round hut known in literature as cone on cylinder or cone on drum hut. The hut has different names in various African languages. It is constructed usually with a conical foundation and peaked thatched roof. It is most commonly made out of mud and its roof is often made with grass and with local materials. It has been constructed for thousands of years. The thatched-roofed, plastered type mud houses construction was found early in East Africa, where various local indigenous tribes built them, using them as homestead alongside lifestyle with agriculture and farming. The mud hut is extremely common throughout rural parts of the African continent. They can be different in shape and size depending on the region in which they are built.

== Architecture ==
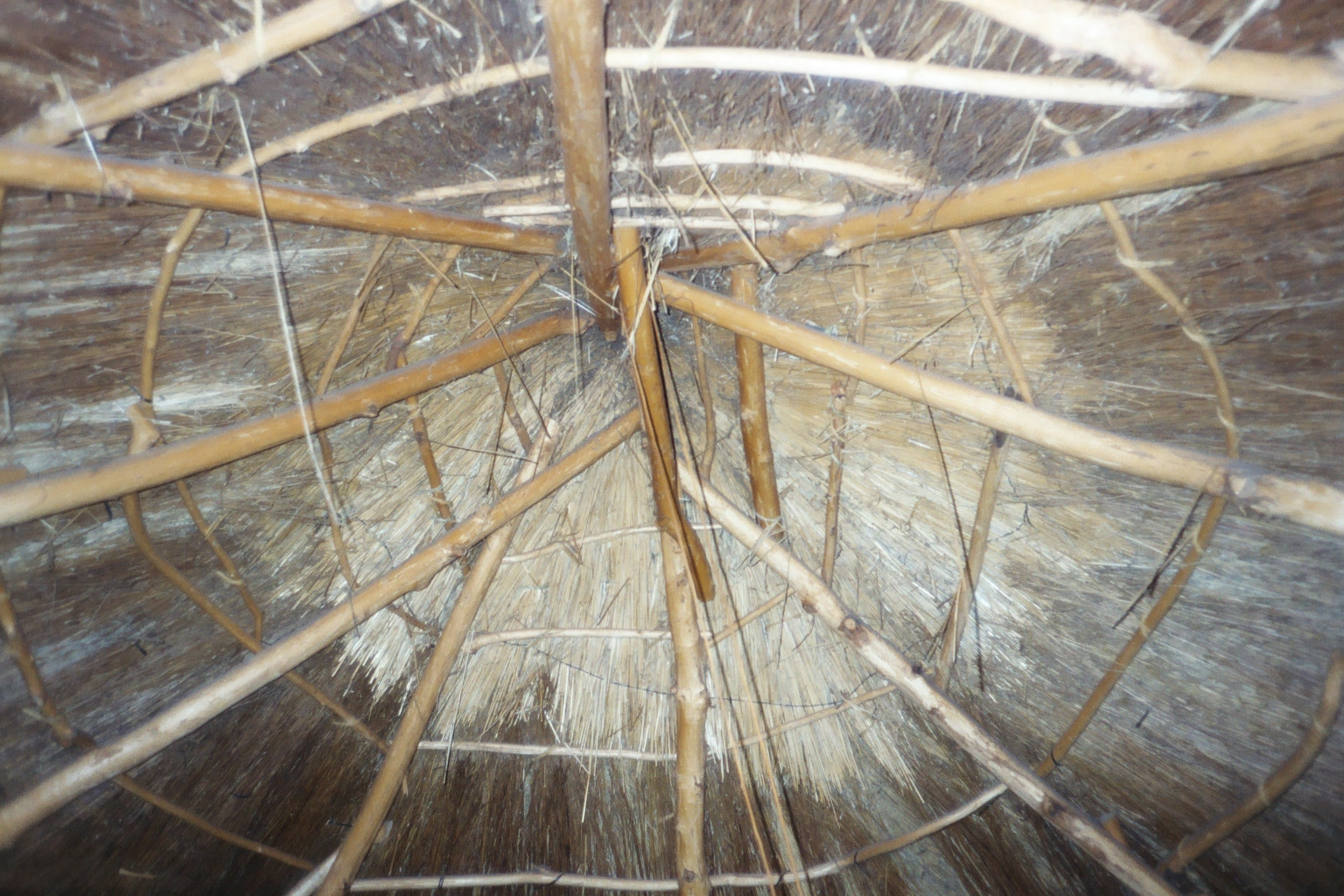
Inside a hut looking towards the ceiling

An African round hut is a seen as vernacular architecture since they are built of readily available materials. The huts can be built using mud, cow manure, bricks or grass in some cases. A new mud hut will last 1-2 years, depending on the amount of rain and erosion. The huts were built so they could be loosely clustered around open spaces, which provided ventilation and breezes, in order to provide comfort in the warm conditions of the tropics.

== Names and types ==
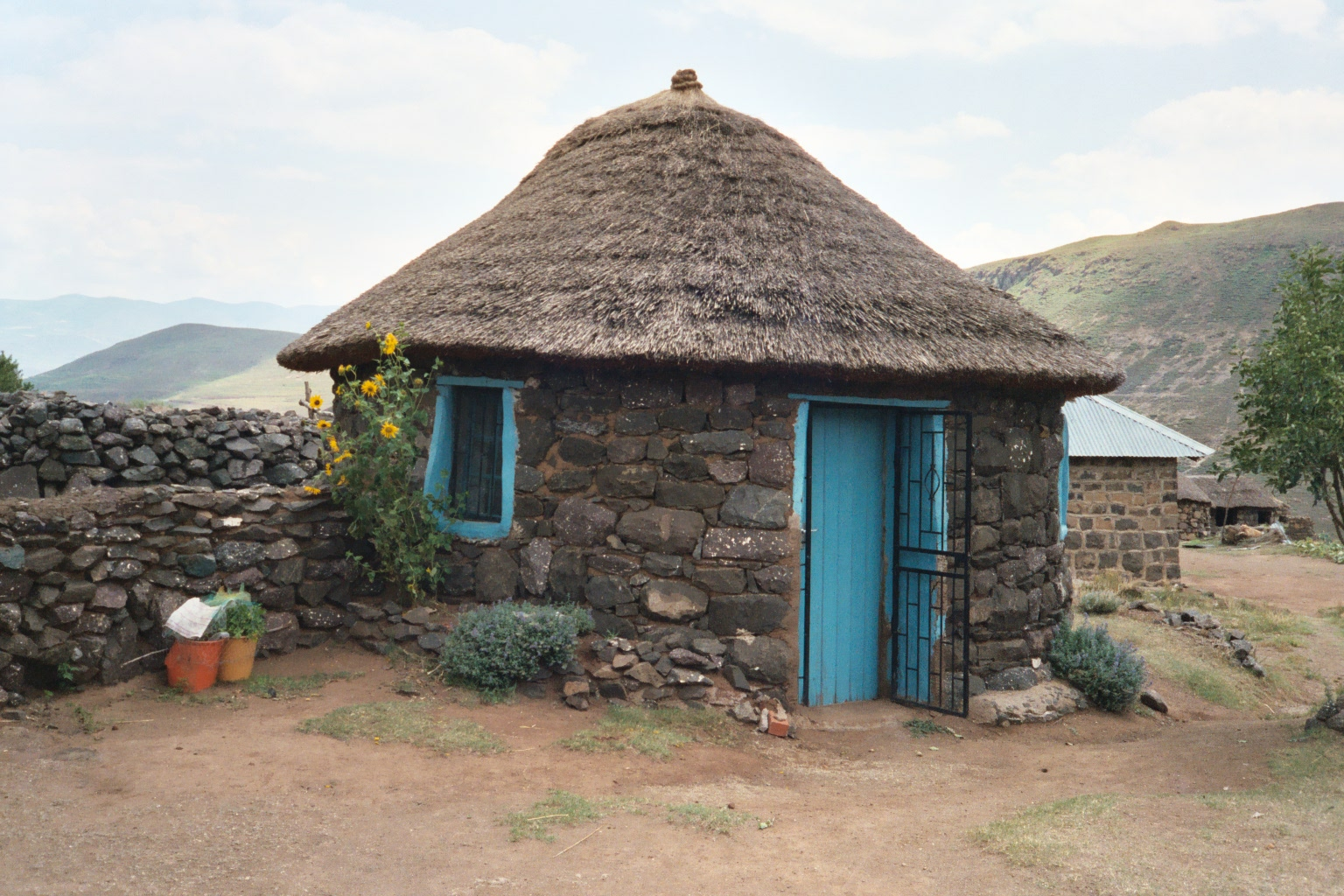
An undecorated rondavel

Depending on location the name of the African round hut can vary. Here is a list of what the huts are called in various African countries:

Regions of Africa
Country	Local name
Angola	Mbukushu
Botswana	Dumela
Congo	Cob/Adobe
Eritrea	Tukul/Agudo
Ethiopia	Godjo
Kenya	Itambi
Namibia	Kraals
Lesotho	Mokhoro
South Africa	Rondavel
South Sudan	Hotnhial
Ghana	Atta Kwame
