= Timeline of Khartoum =

Coordinates: 15.633333°N 32.533333°E

The following is a timeline of the history of the city of Khartoum, Sudan.

== Prehistoric times ==
- circa 5000 BCE, first documented skull, human bones and tools found in 1945

== 19th century ==
- 1821 – Settlement established by Ibrahim Pasha of Egypt.
- 1824 – "Egyptian governor Uthman Bey establishes Khartoum as a military centre."
- 1826 – Ali Khurshid Pasha in power.
- 1829 – Mosque built.
- 1830 – Town becomes capital of "the Sudanese possessions of Egypt."
- 1838 – Disease outbreak; capital relocated temporarily to Shendi.
- 1840 – Flood.
- 1841 – Flood.
- 1854 – Muhammad Sa'id Pasha in power.
- 1856 – Disease outbreak; capital relocated temporarily to Shendi.
- 1862 – Chamber of Commerce established.
- 1866 – Consulates of Austria, France, Italy, Persia, and Tuscany established.
- 1869 – Flood.
- 1874 – Flood.
- 1878 – Flood.
- 1884 – 13 March: Siege of Khartoum begins.
- 1885
  - 26 January: Mahdists in power.
  - Capital relocated to Omdurman from Khartoum.
- 1898
  - 2 September: Conflict between Mahdist and British forces.
  - Seat of government relocates to Khartoum from Omdurman.
- 1899
  - Town becomes capital of Anglo-Egyptian Sudan.
  - Railway begins operating (Wadi Halfa-Khartoum).
  - Sudan Gazette (government newspaper) begins publication.

== 20th century ==
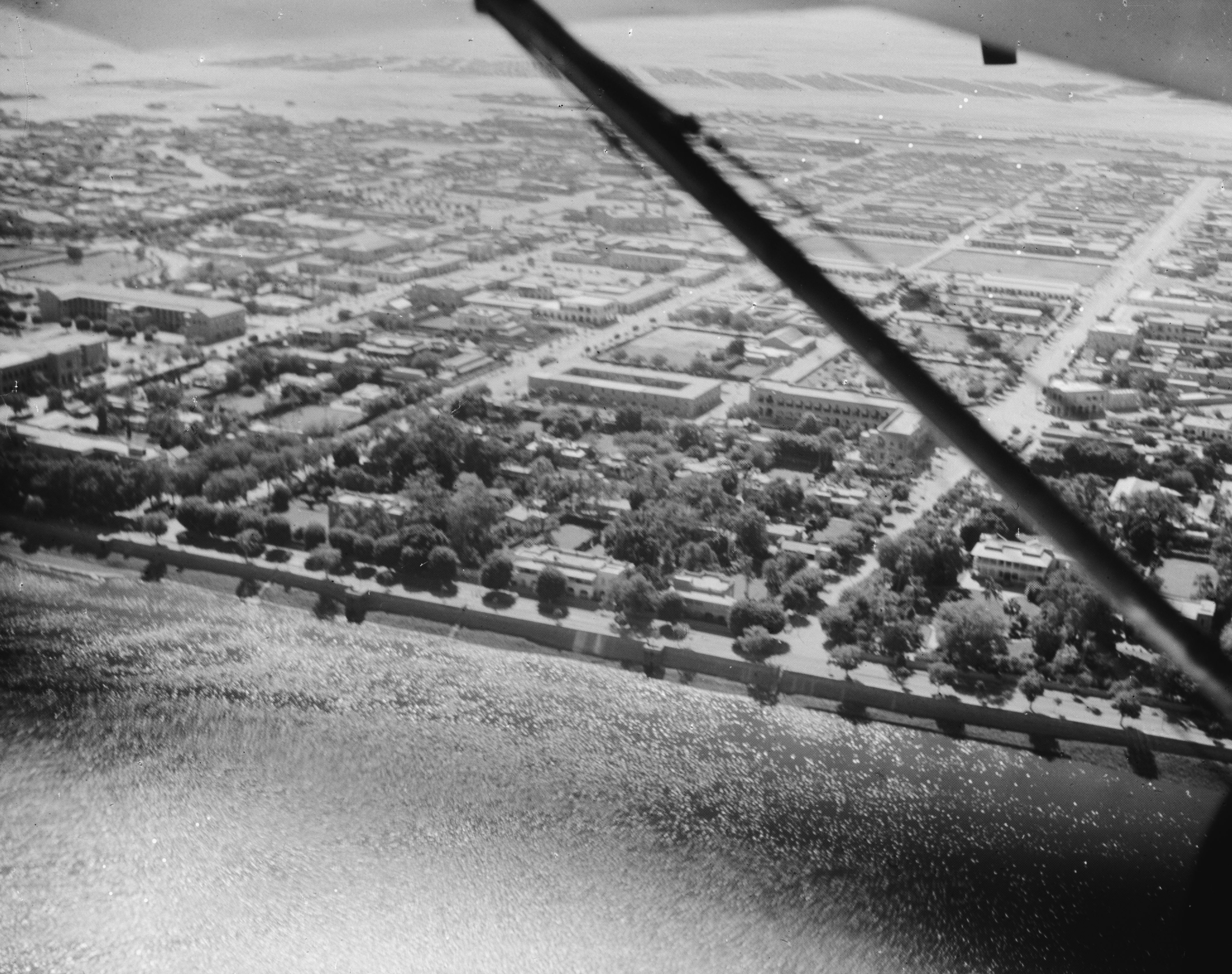
Aerial view of Khartoum, 1936

- 1902
  - Wellcome Tropical Research Laboratories and Coptic Girls School open.
  - Population: 25,000.
- 1903 – Gordon Memorial College opens.
- 1905 – Military academy opens.
- 1907 – Population: 69,349.
- 1909 – Blue Nile Road and Railway Bridge built to Halfaya.
- 1911 – Sudan Herald newspaper begins publication.
- 1912 – Cathedral Church of All Saints consecrated.
- 1913 – Famine.
- 1924
  - Demonstrations.
  - Flood.
  - Kitchener School of Medicine established.
- 1926 – White Nile Bridge to Omdurman built.
- 1928 – Unity High School for Girls founded.
- 1946 – Flood.
- 1950 – Al Khartoum Sports Club formed.
- 1952 – Acropole Hotel in business.
- 1954 – Population: 100,000 (approximate).
- 1955 – Area of city: 7.9 square kilometers.
- 1956
  - 1 January: City becomes capital of independent Republic of Sudan.
  - University of Khartoum established.
- 1957
  - Municipal Stadium opens.
  - Khartoum American School established.
- 1960 – Bank of Sudan headquartered in Khartoum.
- 1962 – Industrial Bank of Sudan opens.
- 1964 – Population: 173,500.
- 1967 – August: Arab League summit held.
- 1970
  - Area of city: 13.3 square kilometers.
  - Bank of Khartoum established.
- 1971
  - National Museum of Sudan established.
  - Population: 261,840.
- 1973
  - August: Anti-government unrest.
  - Saudi embassy held by Palestinian militants.
- 1974 – Catholic Metropolitan Archdiocese of Khartoum formed.
- 1976 – Friendship Hall built.
- 1977 – Oil pipeline to Port Sudan completed.
- 1978 – July – Organisation of African Unity summit held.
- 1980 – Area of city: 101.3 square kilometers.
- 1983
  - September: Islamic law in effect.
  - University of Juba relocates to Khartoum (approximate date).
- 1984
  - March: Teacher/doctor strike begins.
  - El-Sheikh Mosque built.
- 1985
  - March: Economic protest.
  - Population: 1,611,000 (urban agglomeration).
- 1988 – Flood.
- 1990 – Population: 2,360,000 (urban agglomeration).
- 1991
  - City becomes part of Khartoum federal state (administrative region).
  - Popular Arab and Islamic Congress held in city.
- 1992 – Khartoum International Airport terminal opens.
- 1993
  - Khartoum Bank Group formed.
  - Sudatel headquartered in Khartoum.
  - Population: 924,505 city.
- 1994 – Venezuelan criminal Carlos the Jackal arrested in Khartoum.
- 1995
  - Khartoum Stock Exchange begins trading.
  - Population: 3,088,000 (urban agglomeration).
- 1997 – Greater Nile Petroleum Operating Company incorporated.
- 1998
  - August: Al-Shifa pharmaceutical factory in Khartoum North bombed by U.S. forces.
  - Area of city: 343.8 square kilometers.
- 1999
  - Ibrahim Malik Islamic Center built.
  - Republican Palace Museum opens.
  - Greater Nile Oil Pipeline in operation.
- 2000
  - Khartoum Monitor newspaper begins publication.
  - Population: 3,505,000 (urban agglomeration).

== 21st century ==
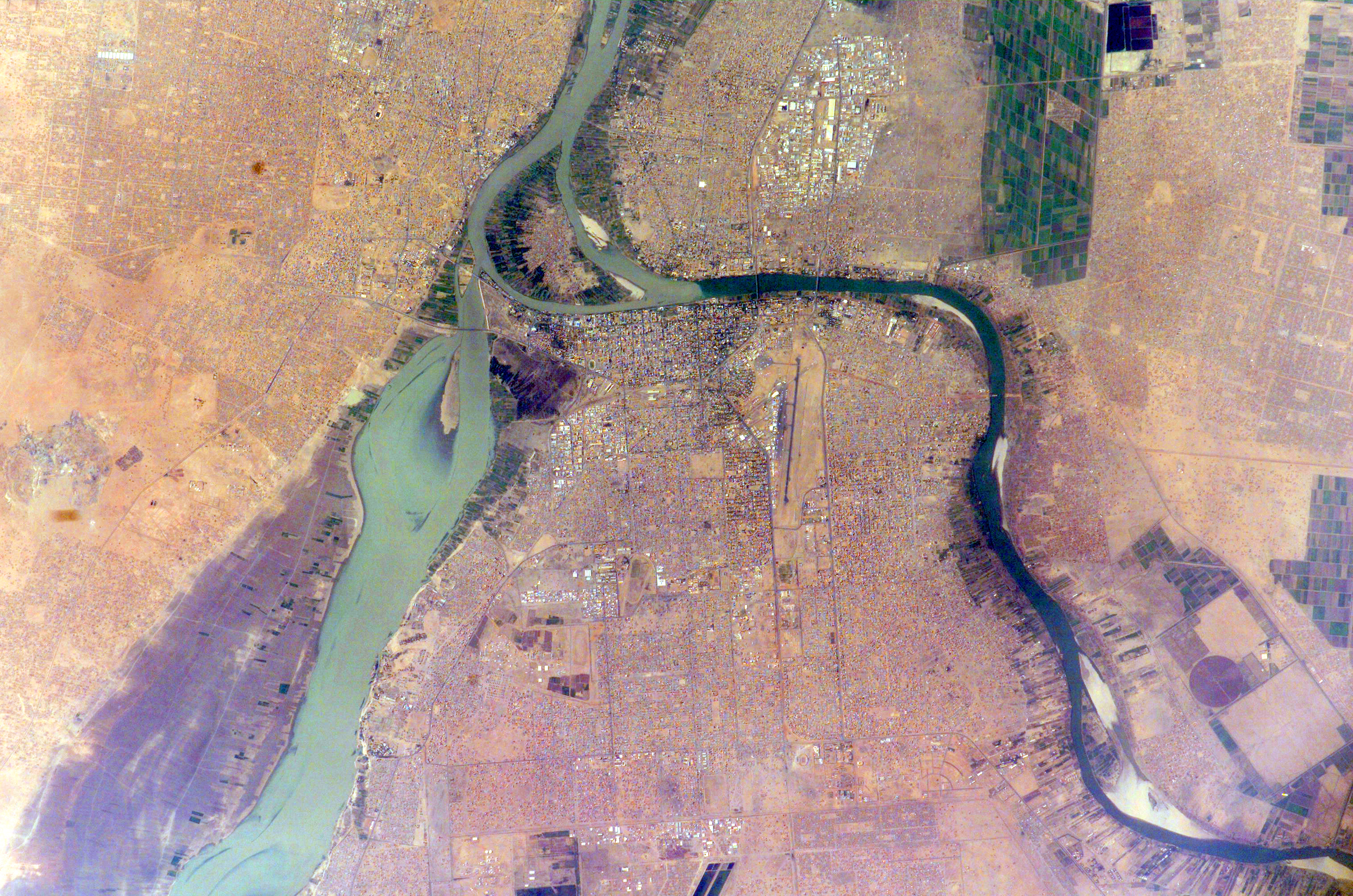
Aerial view of the cities of Omdurman (top left), Khartoum (lower half), and Bahri (top right), 2005

=== 2000s ===
- 2005
  - July: Demonstrations.
  - Citizen (Juba) newspaper begins publication.
  - Population: 3,979,000 (urban agglomeration).
  - City designated an Arab Capital of Culture by Arab League/UNESCO.
- 2006
  - January: African Union summit held.
  - March: Arab League summit held.
- 2007 – El Mek Nimr Bridge to Khartoum North built.
- 2008
  - 10–12 May: City besieged by anti-government forces.
  - Population: 639,598.
- 2009 – Tuti Bridge opens.

=== 2010s ===
- 2010 – Population: 4,516,000 (urban agglomeration).
- 2012
  - June: Economic protest.
  - October: al-Yarmook armament factory bombed.

== See also ==
- Khartoum history
- Timeline of Sudanese history
- List of universities in Khartoum

== Bibliography ==
Published in 20th century

- "Omdurman, Khartoum North, and Khartoum", Anglo-Egyptian Sudan: a compendium prepared by officers of the Sudan government, London: H.M. Stationery Office, 1905
- Arkell, A. J. Early Khartoum. CUP, Cambridge 1949.
- Ernest Alfred Wallis Budge (1906), "Khartum", Cook's Handbook for Egypt and the Sudan (2nd ed.), London: T. Cook & Son, OCLC 7434398
- Eustace A. Reynolds-Ball (1907), "Khartoum", Cairo of To-Day (5th ed.), London: Adam & Charles Black
- "Khartum". Guide to Egypt and the Sudan (5th ed.). London: Macmillan and Co. 1908.
- "Khartum" . Encyclopædia Britannica. Vol. 15 (11th ed.). 1910. p. 773.
- "Khartum and Omdurman", Egypt and the Sudan (7th ed.), Leipzig: Karl Baedeker, 1914
- McLean, W. H. The planning of Khartoum and Omdurman; transactions of the Town Planning Conference, October 1910. London 1919.
- El-Bushra, El-Sayed (1979). "Some Demographic Indicators for Khartoum Conurbation, Sudan". Middle Eastern Studies. 15 (3): 295–309. doi:10.1080/00263207908700413. JSTOR 4282756. PMID 11614947.
- H. R. J. Davies (1994). "A Rural 'Eye' in the Capital: Tuti Island, Khartoum, Sudan". GeoJournal. 33 (4): 387–392. doi:10.1007/BF00806421. JSTOR 41146238. S2CID 154051487.
- Stevenson, R. C. (1966). "Old Khartoum, 1821-1885". Sudan Notes and Records. 47: 28f. ISSN 0375-2984. JSTOR 44947302.
- R.P.D. Walsh; et al. (1994). "Flood Frequency and Impacts at Khartoum since the Early Nineteenth Century". Geographical Journal. 160 (3): 266–279. doi:10.2307/3059609. JSTOR 3059609.
- Noelle Watson, ed. (1996). "Khartoum". International Dictionary of Historic Places: Middle East and Africa. UK: Routledge. pp. 420+. ISBN 1-884964-03-6.
- Walkley, C. (1935). The story of Khartoum. Sudan Notes and Records, 18(2), 221–241.

Published in 21st century

- Galal Eldin Eltayeb (2003). "The Case of Khartoum, Sudan". Understanding Slums: Case Studies for the Global Report 2003. United Nations Human Settlements Programme and University College London.
- Paul Tiyambe Zeleza; Dickson Eyoh, eds. (2003). "Khartoum, Sudan". Encyclopedia of Twentieth-Century African History. Routledge. ISBN 0-415-23479-4.
- Kevin Shillington, ed. (2005). "Khartoum". Encyclopedia of African History. Fitzroy Dearborn. ISBN 978-1-57958-245-6.
- Bruce E. Stanley; Michael R.T. Dumper, eds. (2008), "Khartoum", Cities of the Middle East and North Africa, Santa Barbara, US: ABC-CLIO
- Sara Pantuliano; et al. (2011), City Limits: Urbanisation and Vulnerability in Sudan: Khartoum Case Study, London: Overseas Development Institute – via International Relations and Security Network
