= Disasters (journal) =

- Discipline: Planning and Development
- Language: English
- Edited by: Sara Pantuliano, Helen Young, John Twigg

Publication details
- History: 1977–present
- Publisher: Wiley-Blackwell for the Overseas Development Institute
- Frequency: Quarterly
- Impact factor: 0.692 (2011)

Standard abbreviations
- ISO 4: Disasters

Indexing
- ISSN: 0361-3666 (print); 1467-7717 (web)

Links
- Journal homepage; Online access; Online archive

Disasters is a quarterly peer-reviewed academic journal published by Wiley-Blackwell for the Overseas Development Institute (ODI). Disasters is managed by the Humanitarian Policy Group at the ODI. The journal was established in 1977 and covers aspects of disaster studies, policy and management. Disasters publishes field reports, case study articles and academic papers. It is currently edited by Sara Pantuliano (Overseas Development Institute), Helen Young (Tufts University), and John Twigg (University College London).

According to the Journal Citation Reports, the journal has a 2011 impact factor of 0.692, ranking it 36th out of 54 journals in the category "Planning & Development".
