= History of the Jews in Sudan =

The location of Sudan in Africa

The history of the Jews in Sudan goes back to a small but vibrant community of Jews who lived there from about 1885 to around 1970. Most of the community left for Israel or Europe after antisemitic attacks began to spread against both the Jews in Israel and those still living in Sudan.

== History ==
=== Pre-History ===
The earliest known mention of the name Yahweh occurs in Egyptian hieroglyphic inscriptions from the 14th century BC (c. 1400–1352 BC) at Soleb in Sudan, Due to other Jewish presence near Sudan, such as in Elephantine, Abyssinia, and Yemen, there is a possibility that there were Jews in the region earlier than the 15th century. However, David Reubini (1490–1540), is thought to be the first Jewish traveler to the region.

=== Mahdist Rule ===
There was a small Jewish presence consisting of eight Sephardi Jewish families in 1885 living in Omdurman in Sudan, under Turkish and Egyptian rule. The origins of these families and how they settled in Sudan is largely unknown. They were free to practice Judaism until the rebel leader Muhamed Ahmed Ibn Abdulla El-Mahdi seized control of Sudan from its Ottoman-Egyptian rulers in 1885 and established Mahdist Sudan. During Mahdist rule, the Jewish community was forcibly converted to Islam. The leader of the Sudanese Jews at this time was a Turkish Jew name Ben-Zion Coshi, who practiced crypto-Judaism after his forced conversion. During Mahdist rule, the community was forced to go to the Grand Mosque of Omdurman, especially on Fridays. With agents assigned to watch over them and ensure they complied.

=== Anglo-Egyptian Rule ===
In September 1898, General Kitchener and 20,000 Anglo-Egyptian troops including a young Winston Churchill entered Omdurman and regained control of the Sudan. The country became an Anglo-Egyptian condominium and with this new political status it began to economically flourish. The railway line built by the British from Cairo to Khartoum (originally for the military campaign) became particularly important for opening up a previously long and difficult route for traders, including many Jews.

When the British arrived in 1898, there were 36 people who declared themselves to be Jewish in Sudan. After Anglo-Egyptian rule had been established, six of the formerly Jewish families who had been forcibly converted to Islam reverted to Judaism, though some did not return. They were quickly joined by many more Jewish families who saw the economic opportunities of the developing country. Beginning in approximately 1900, Jews from all over the Middle East and North Africa, in particular from Egypt, Iraq, and Syria, began to arrive in Sudan and settle along the Nile in the four towns of Khartoum, Khartoum North, Omdurman and Wad Madani. Predominantly small-time merchants of textiles, silks and gum, their businesses soon began to flourish. In 1905, Farag Shua, an Egyptian-Jewish merchant who had migrated to Sudan in 1900, established a makeshift synagogue in a small rented room and began teaching Jewish children Torah, Hebrew, and Jewish prayers. In 1908 the community established an organization called the Sudan Jewish Community, with Ben-Zion Coshi being elected as its president for life, serving until his death in 1917.

Sudan did not have a rabbi until 1908, when Moroccan rabbi Suleiman Malka moved to Sudan with his family at the request of the Egyptian-Jewish religious authorities, who oversaw the affairs of the Sudanese Jews. The Jewish community of Khartoum was first officially organized in 1918. By 1926 the small synagogue they had quickly erected had been replaced by a brand new, self-funded building and several of its members owned large, successful businesses. In the 1930s, a few Jews escaping persecution in Europe settled in Sudan.

Despite the fact that the Jewish community as a whole was split between Khartoum, Khartoum North and Omdurman, it was incredibly tight-knit. There was only one synagogue in Sudan and two mikvehs, one in the synagogue and the other in the rabbi's house. A single mohel and shochet served the entire community and at the centre of the social scene was the bustling Jewish Social Club (sometimes referred to as the Jewish Recreational Club). There were no Jewish schools; Jewish children primarily went to English or Catholic schools with some going to a local Sudanese school. Most Jewish boys went to the Comboni College, a private Catholic school run by Italian priests.

At the time Jewish leaders would frequently travel between South Africa and Mandatory Palestine, but do the mechanical limits of aircraft they would do stopovers in either French Madagascar or Sudan, with these stopover being turned into opportunities for the Jewish leaders on these flights to visit the Sudanese Jewish community, with the most notable visits being from Rabbi Yitzchak Herzog, Nahum Solokov, and Rabbi Israel Brodie.

At its peak, between 1930 and 1950 the Jewish community in Sudan numbered between 800 and 1,000 people, with about 250 Jewish families.

=== Decline ===
During the World War 2, anxiety and uncertainty began to rise in the Jewish community. The vigorously antisemitic broadcasts of Amin Al-Husseini reached Sudan, in these broadcasts Husseini called upon all Arabs to "kill the Jews wherever you find them. It pleases Allah". While at the same time Erwin Rommel's invasion of Egypt and the sympathy shown by many Egyptian nationalists caused some Egyptian Jews to relocate to Sudan for their own safety.

During the 1948 Israeli War of Independence groups of Sudanese merchants raised money for the Palestinian cause, heavily pressuring Sudanese Jewish merchants with many being pressured into donating. At the same time, Sudanese Jews who had stopover flights in Egypt were harassed and heavily monitored by the Egyptians for being Jewish. After Israeli independence in 1948, a small number of Sudanese Jews immigrated to Israel between 1948 and 1950. Most of them were among the poorer members of the Jewish community and migrated for economic reasons. The community banded together to purchase tickets to Israel for its poorest members so they could start a new life there.

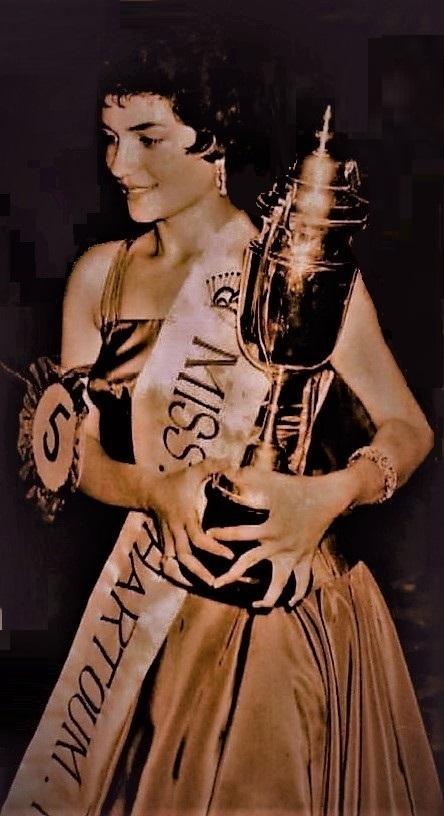
Yvonne Cohen, a Jewish teenager, winning Miss Khartoum 1956

Rabbi Suleiman Malka died in 1949 and the community was left without a rabbi. In 1956, Sudan gained independence and hostility towards the Jewish community began to grow as the Pan-Arabism of Egyptian President Gamal Abdel Nasser, with the anti-Israel rhetoric it entailed, gained popularity. Antisemitic attacks appeared in the press and Jews were accused of being fifth columnists.

However, as antisemitism intensified, many members of the community began to leave Sudan for Israel (via Greece), the United States, and European countries - mostly to the United Kingdom and Switzerland. Israel and Switzerland were the primary destinations of emigrating Sudanese Jews. Much of the community had left by 1960. In 1967, following the Six-Day War, there was a mass arrest of Jewish men and antisemitic attacks appeared in Sudanese newspapers advocating the torture and murder of prominent Jewish community leaders. Jewish emigration subsequently intensified, with the vast majority of Jews still in the country soon leaving. The last remaining Jews in Sudan left the country in the early 1970s. Overall, about 500 Sudanese Jews immigrated to Israel while the rest went to other countries. In response to a ruling from the Sahedrin calling on all Jews in exile to go up to Israel, a letter of 30 December 2024 from remnant of Jews in Sudan and Ethiopia who have declared their willingness to go up to Israel.

== Legacy ==
In 1975 an air-transfer of some of the human remains from the Jewish Cemetery in Khartoum was organized by several prominent members of the community and reburial was arranged in Jerusalem after reports of desecration and vandalism occurring there. The bodies were moved and reburied at the Givat Shaul Cemetery in Jerusalem. As of 2005 there were at least 15 Jewish graves left in the Jewish Cemetery at Khartoum. However, in recent years even these have been desecrated and the site was used as a dumping ground for used car parts. In the last year efforts have been made to preserve and clean up the cemetery. The Synagogue was sold for $200,000 and demolished in 1986 and a bank now occupies the site.

== Notable Sudanese Jews ==
- Nessim Gaon (1922-2022) President of World Sephardi Federation, vice president of the World Jewish Congress
- Leon Tamman (1927-1995) Head of World Sephardic Federation, philanthropist, businessman.

== See also ==
- History of the Jews in Africa

=== Regions: ===
- History of the Jews in Central Africa
- History of the Jews in East Africa
- History of the Jews in North Africa
- History of the Jews in Southern Africa
- History of the Jews in West Africa

=== Topics: ===
- Jewish exodus from Arab and Muslim countries
