= Tukul =

Term of round-shaped home native to East Africa

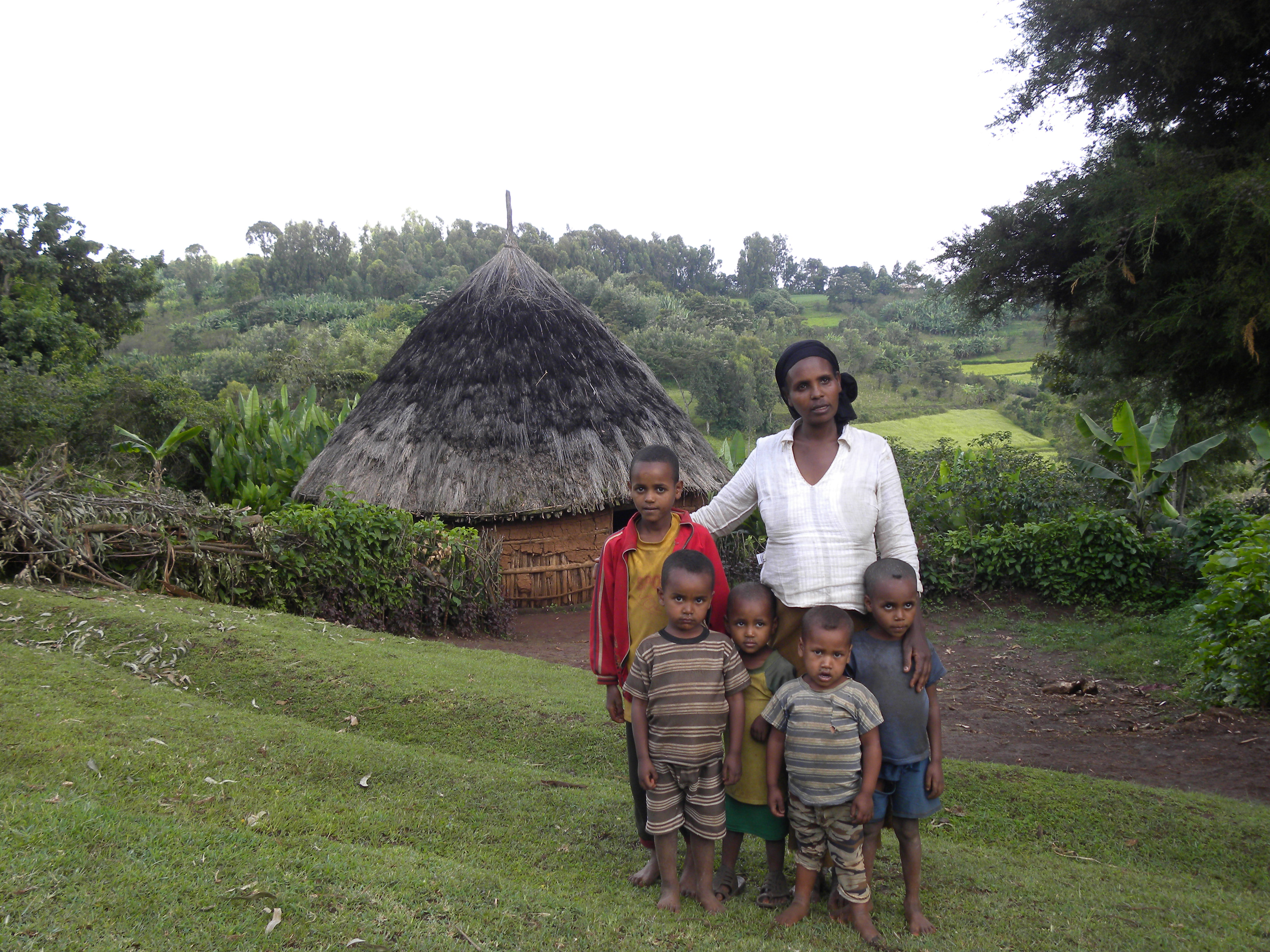
Kambaata mother with her children in front of their tukul in the Kembata Tembaro Zone, Ethiopia

A Tukul (also spelled "Tekul") is a type of round hut found in Ethiopia, Eritrea, Sudan, South Sudan and other parts of East Africa.

A tukul was the emblem of Ethiopia's former Southern Nations, Nationalities, and Peoples' Region, and has been the emblem of the Central Ethiopia Regional State since 2013, as a symbol of local culture.
