= Turkish graves (Khartoum) =

Historic cemetery for Ottoman governors in Sudan

Turkish Military Cemetery

Details
- Established: 1885
- Location: Khartoum, Sudan
- Style: Neo-Ottoman
- Owned by: Government of Sudan

The Turkish graves in Khartoum were built for Ottoman provincial governors of the Turkish Sudan in Neo-Ottoman style in the mid-19th century.

== History ==
In his article about the graves, historian Andrew McGregor described "the complicated sequence of power politics in Egypt and in the Sudan, which 'explains' the existence of those two burial monuments in an area where most such monuments were destroyed after the Mahdi's conquest in 1885. These qubba-s are grave monuments of two nineteenth century Circassian governors-general of the Sudan in the service of Viceroy Muhammad 'Ali and his descendants. In the qubba-s can be seen the passing of an extraordinary age of Circassian prominence in the Nile Valley."

The eastern dome or qubba marks the grave of Ahmad Pasha Abu Widan, who ruled the country in 1839 and died in 1843. Under the western qubba are buried Ahmad Pasha al-Munikili, who ruled from 1844 to 1845, and Musa Pasha Hamdi, who ruled from 1862 to 1865, and there is a small tomb for one of his family members.

In the open part of the enclosure, Muhammad Pasha Mumtaz was buried, as well as a group of Sudanese officers in the Egyptian army, including Adam Pasha Al-Arifi, Almaz Pasha Muhammad, and there is a tomb for Ibrahim Bey Marzouq, an Egyptian writer.

== See also ==
- History of Sudan
- Turkish Sudan
