= Souq al Arabi =

Open-air market in Khartoum, Sudan

Coordinates: 15.601°N 32.525°E

The Souq al Arabi (Arabic: السوق العربي, lit. 'Arab Market') is the largest open-air market in Khartoum, Sudan.

== Structure and size ==
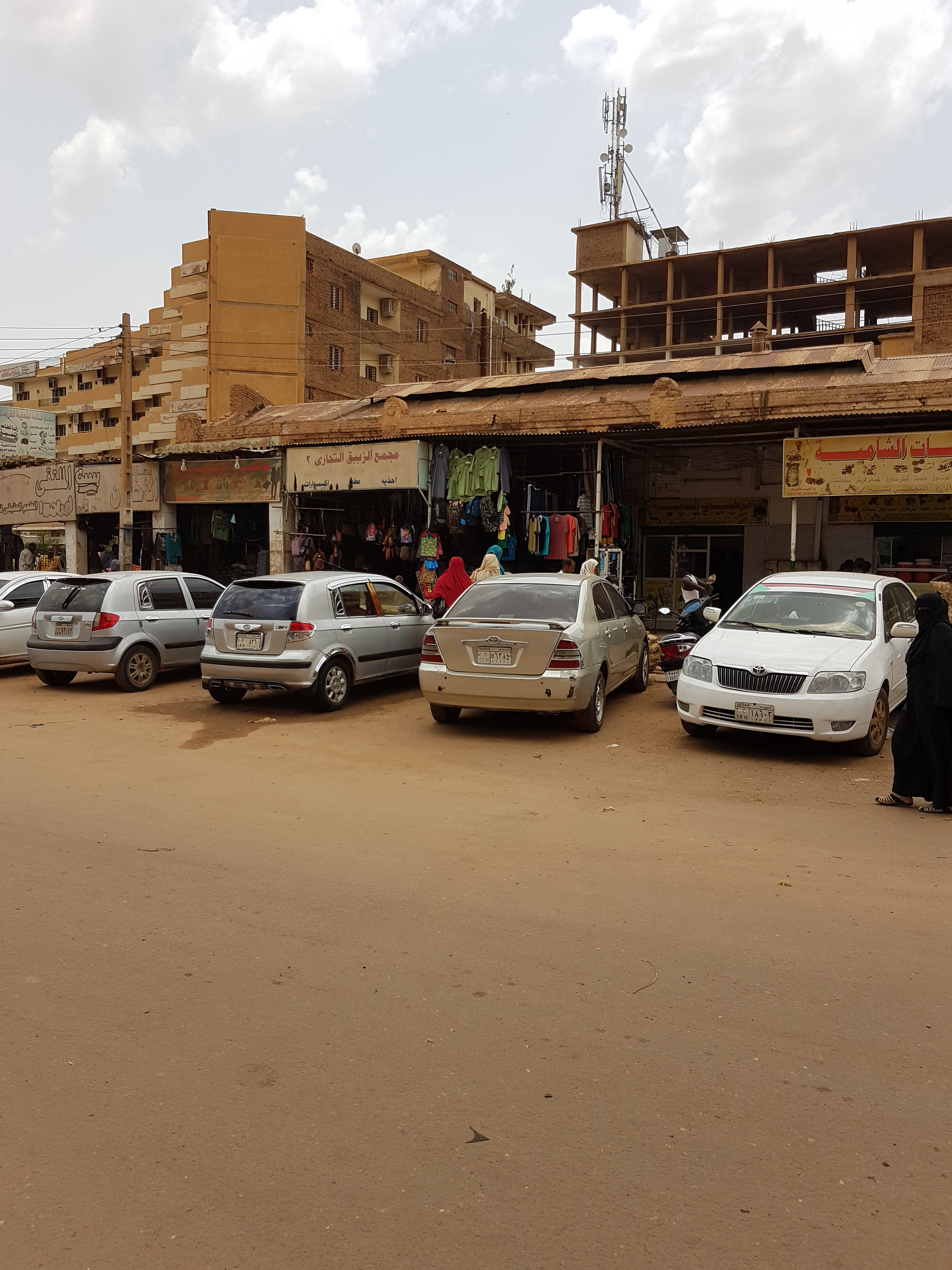
Souq Al Arabi Khartoum

The market is spread over several blocks in the center of Khartoum proper, just south of the Great Mosque (Masjid al-Kabir) and the minibus station. Sellers are located in sections according to the type of goods they offer.
