= Atta-Kwame mud house =

Type of Ghanaian mud house

Houses made from mud commonly called "Atta Kwame" are ancient and traditional buildings mostly found in villages in Ghana. People from Ashanti region in Ghana believe that houses made from mud are for the poor and could not create beauty and good living conditions for long-term. These houses are not enough protected from the rain and large surfaces of mud or concrete are not flexible enough and has tendency to crack.

Traditional architecture is part of a nation's heritage. An example are Ghana's old mud houses, some of which give shelter to entire extended families. Many buildings are, however, affected by erosion and poorly maintained. Policymakers should pay attention.

Many traditional mud houses are in bad shape. The general problem is poor maintenance. Many mud houses are dilapidated. A core challenge is that their foundations are exposed to erosion and show signs of weakness.

Modifications are being made to the traditional mud houses to meet contemporary demands. The rammed earth technique is just a mixture of laterite, clay and then granite chippings.

In order to understand the modification of mud houses are constructed. A mud house is a building constructed with the soil excavated from the same land where the house is built. This soil is enhanced by natural additives that are locally available like rice husk, paddy straw, etc. The soil is tempered by thoroughly breaking up, watering and kneading and moulded into compressed stabilized earth blocks, which are reusable and have high heat resisting capacity, thus slowing down the rate of temperature changes in the ambient air.
