= Timeline of Sudanese history =

This is a timeline of Sudanese history, comprising important legal and territorial changes and political events in Sudan and its predecessor states. To read about the background to these events, see History of Sudan. See that the list of governors of pre-independence Sudan and list of heads of state of Sudan.

== 10th to 14th centuries ==
Year	Date	Event
c. 975		Ibn Selim al-Aswani visits the Christian kingdoms of Makuria and Alodia, recording a comprehensive geopolitical and economic account of the Nubian courts.
1172		Ayyubid forces commanded by Turan-Shah invade Banu Kanz lands in Nubia, seizing the strategic frontier fortress of Qasr Ibrim.
1272		King David of Makuria launches a military offensive against the Egyptian maritime port of Aidhab on the Red Sea coast.
1276		Mamluk forces under Sultan Baibars invade Makuria, capture Old Dongola, and displace King David to install a puppet ruler subject to tribute payments.
1317	29 May	The Throne Hall of Old Dongola is formally converted into a mosque.
1323		The Christian dynasties of Makuria effectively disintegrated.

== 15th to 18th centuries ==
Year	Date	Event
c. 1504		The Funj Sultanate (Kingdom of Sennar) is founded by Amara Dunqas following the final collapse of the tribal monarchy of Alodia.
c. 1612		The Keira dynasty consolidates the Sultanate of Darfur under Sulayman Solong, establishing Islam as the official state religion.
1744		Battle of the Dindar River: The Funj Sultanate successfully repels a major invasion army launched by the Ethiopian Empire under Emperor Iyasu II.
1762		The Hamaj Coup occurs as military commander Muhammad Abu Likaylik overthrows the ruling Funj monarch, instating the Hamaj Regency and precipitating internal state decay.

== 19th century ==
Year	Date	Event
1881		Mahdist War: A war began against the United Kingdom and Egypt
1899		Sudan fell under the rule of an Anglo-Egyptian condominium.

== 20th century ==
Year	Date	Event
1955		First Sudanese Civil War begins
1956		The country becomes independent as the Republic of the Sudan
1983		Second Sudanese Civil War begins
1998	20 August	Al-Shifa pharmaceutical factory destroyed in a missile strike by the United States

== 21st century ==
Year	Date	Event
2001	February	Al-Turabi was arrested for signing a memorandum with the SPLA.
2001	March	The United Nations (UN) World Food Programme struggled to feed millions facing starvation.
2001	April	The SPLA threatened to attack foreign oil workers.
2001	June	Peace talks in Nairobi broke down.
2001	July	Egypt and Libya proposed a peace plan for Sudan.
2001	September	The UN lifted sanctions against Sudan.
2001	October	United States Senator John Danforth was appointed Special Envoy to Sudan.
2001	November	The United States imposed sanctions on Sudan.
2002	January	A ceasefire was agreed between the government and the SPLA.
2002	20 July	Second Sudanese Civil War: The Machakos Protocol ended the nineteen-year civil war.
2003	February	War in Darfur: The war began.
2004	January	The army moved into Darfur to quell the rebellion, prompting hundreds of thousands of refugees to flee into neighbouring Chad.
2004	March	A UN official accused pro-government Janjaweed militias of carrying out systematic killings in Darfur.
2004	September	United States Secretary of State Colin Powell described the Darfur killings as genocide.
2005	9 January	The Comprehensive Peace Agreement was signed between the SPLA and the government.
2005	March	The United Nations Security Council authorised sanctions against any violators of the Darfur ceasefire.
2005	June	Al-Turabi was freed.
2005	July	John Garang was sworn in as vice-president.
2005	1 August	Garang died in a plane crash and was succeeded by Salva Kiir.
2005	September	A power-sharing government was established.
2005	October	An autonomous government was formed in southern Sudan.
2006	May	The government signed a peace accord with a Darfur rebel group, the Sudan Liberation Movement.
2006	October	Jan Pronk, head of the United Nations Mission in Sudan, was expelled from the country.
2006	November	African Union peacekeepers extended their stay in Darfur for a further six months.
2007	May	The United States placed fresh sanctions on Sudan.
2007	31 July	United Nations Security Council Resolution 1769 authorised twenty-six thousand peacekeepers for Darfur.
2007	August	2007 Sudan floods: Floods began.
2007	September	2007 Sudan floods: The floods ended.
2007	November	Sudanese teddy bear blasphemy case: A British teacher was imprisoned for naming a teddy bear Muhammad.

On 11 and 15 April 2010, Southern Sudan Regional Elections: A South Sudanese There was a regional elections in Southern Sudan in which Salva Kiir won by 93% of the votes.

== See also ==
- Timeline of Khartoum history

== Bibliography ==
- Benjamin Vincent (1910), "Soudan", Haydn's Dictionary of Dates (25th ed.), London: Ward, Lock & Co., hdl:2027/uc2.ark:/13960/t41r6xh8t – via HathiTrust
- "Sudan". Political Chronology of Africa. Political Chronologies of the World. Europa Publications. 2001. p. 401+. ISBN 0203409957.
- Abdel Salam Sidahmed; Alsir Sidahmed (2004). "Chronology". Sudan. Routledge. ISBN 978-1-134-47947-4.
- Peter Woodward (2011). "Sudan". In Andreas Mehler; et al. (eds.). Africa Yearbook: Politics, Economy and Society South of the Sahara in 2010. Vol. 7. Koninklijke Brill. pp. 387+. ISBN 9789004205567. ISSN 1871-2525.
- Robert S. Kramer; et al. (2013). "Chronology". Historical Dictionary of the Sudan (4th ed.). Scarecrow Press. ISBN 978-0-8108-7940-9.
- Peter Woodward (2013). "Sudan". In Andreas Mehler; et al. (eds.). Africa Yearbook: Politics, Economy and Society South of the Sahara in 2012. Vol. 9. Koninklijke Brill. p. 398+. ISBN 9789004256002. ISSN 1871-2525.
