= Sara Pantuliano =

Italian-born British executive (born 1969)

Sara Pantuliano CMG
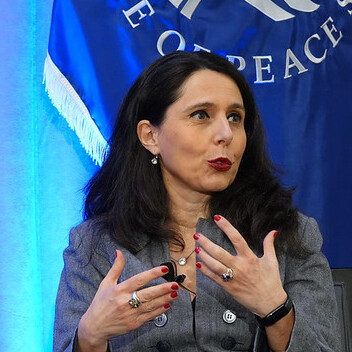
- Born: 1969 (age 56–57); Salerno, Italy
- Education: University of Leeds
- Employer: ODI Global

Sara Pantuliano CMG (born 1969) is the Italian-born British chief executive officer of the think tank ODI Global (formerly Overseas Development Institute). She chairs a United Nations advisory group and is a trustee of Muslim Aid. In 2024 she was made a member of the Order of St Michael and St George by the British King Charles III.

== Life ==
Pantuliano was born in Salerno in 1969. Her first degree was in 1993 at the Istituto Universitario Orientale in Naples.

In 2000, she was awarded a doctorate by the University of Leeds after four years of study in Politics and International Studies. She studied the Beja nomad people of Sudan under Professor Lionel Cliffe of the Leeds University Centre for African Studies.

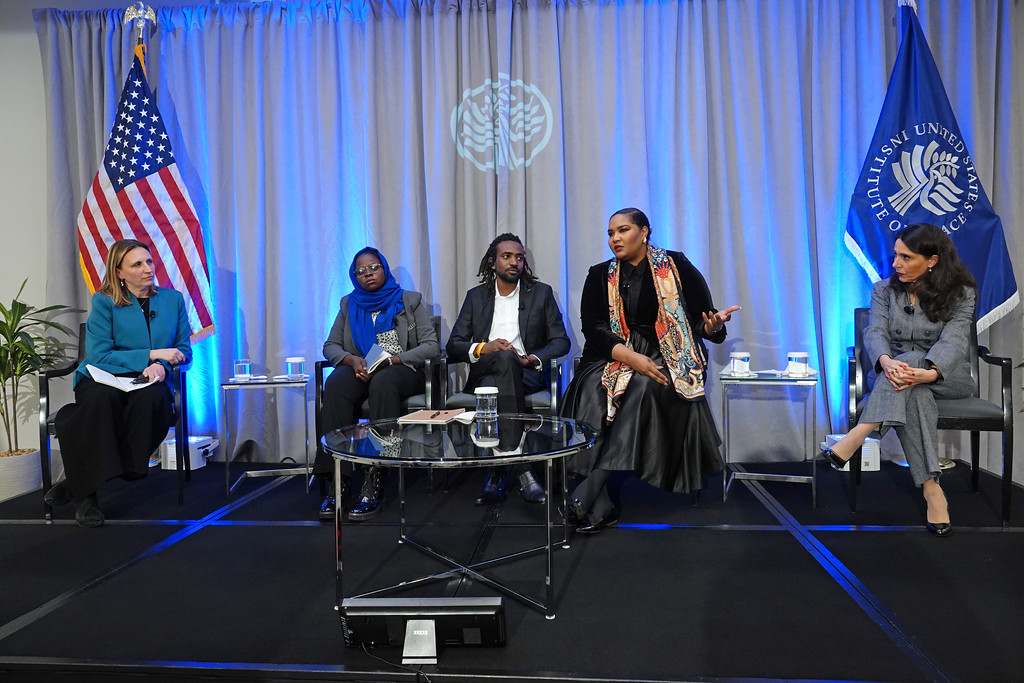
left to right at the United States Institute of Peace in 2024: Susan Stigant, Omima Omer Jabal Yagwb, Abuzar Osman, Kholood Khair and Pantuliano

In 2009 she and Sara Pavanello published a paper on drought in the Horn of Africa for ODI Global. She also published a paper titled Uncharted Territory: Land, Conflict and Humanitarian Action which looked at Human rights in Pakistan.

In 2018, she became a trustee of Muslim Aid.

In 2022, the UN Secretary-General appointed her to lead the seventh Advisory Group of the Peacebuilding Fund. The UN's Peacebuilding Fund aims to supply a rapid response to a crisis. In 2021 the fund gave aid worth nearly $200m to 32 different countries. The group's members include Lise Filiatrault, Marriët Schuurman and Almut Wieland-Karimi.

Pantuliano was one of the editors of the academic journal Disasters in 2024. The journal is published on behalf of ODI Global.

In 2024, she was made a member of the Order of St Michael and St George by Charles III as part of the New Years Honours in recognition of her work including that for the UN and ODI Global.
