= Comboni College of Science & Technology =

Private educational institution in Khartoum, Sudan

Coordinates: 15°36′3″N 32°31′40″E

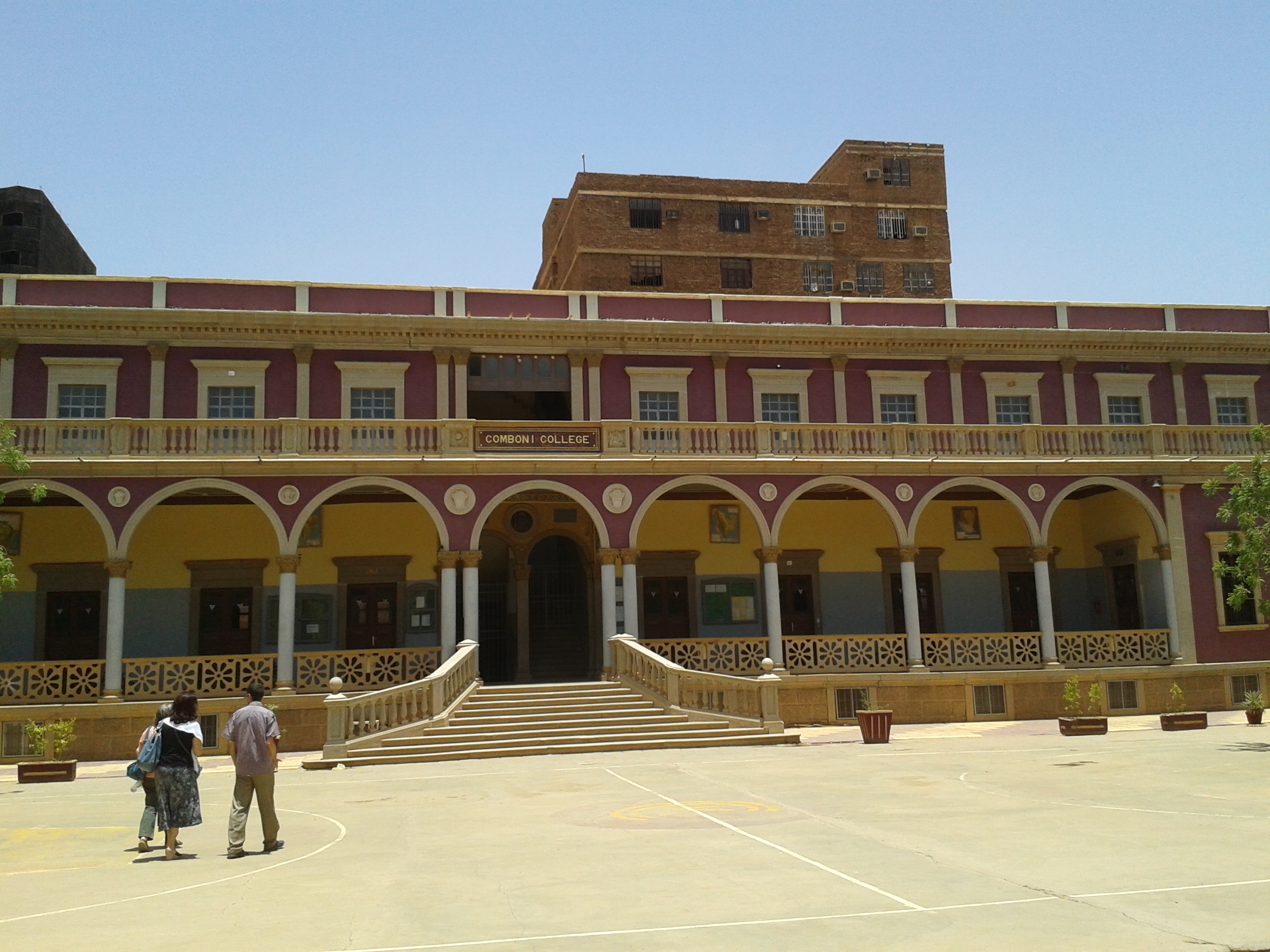
- Comboni College Khartoum
- Motto: Always More Always Better
- Type: Private
- Established: 2001
- Location: Khartoum, Sudan
- Colors: Blue and white
- Website: www.combonikhartoum.com

Comboni College for Science and Technology (CCST), originally Comboni College for Computer Science, is a private college in Khartoum, Sudan, established as a technical college since 2001. It goes back to the earlier school for boys, founded by Catholic priests from Italy in 1929.

== History ==
Comboni College Khartoum was founded in 1929 as a boys school by Catholic priests associated with the mission of Bishop Daniele Comboni. It was managed by priests and monks, who arrived in Sudan to continue Comboni´s work in education. Since its beginning, the college catered to students both with an international background, but most of them were Sudanese children.

In 1999, parents asked the management to develop a post-secondary section. In 2001, this initiative led to the present Comboni College of Science and Technology (CCST) as a separate institution from the primary and secondary sections of Comboni College Khartoum.

== Programs ==
- Computer Science (CS)
- Information Technology (IT)
- English Language and Literature (Eng)
- Education and Religious Studies
- Short Courses in computer skills, languages, teaching methods and palliative care

== See also ==
- The Catholic University of South Sudan
