= Outline of Sudan =

Overview of and topical guide to Sudan

Flag of Sudan

Emblem of Sudan

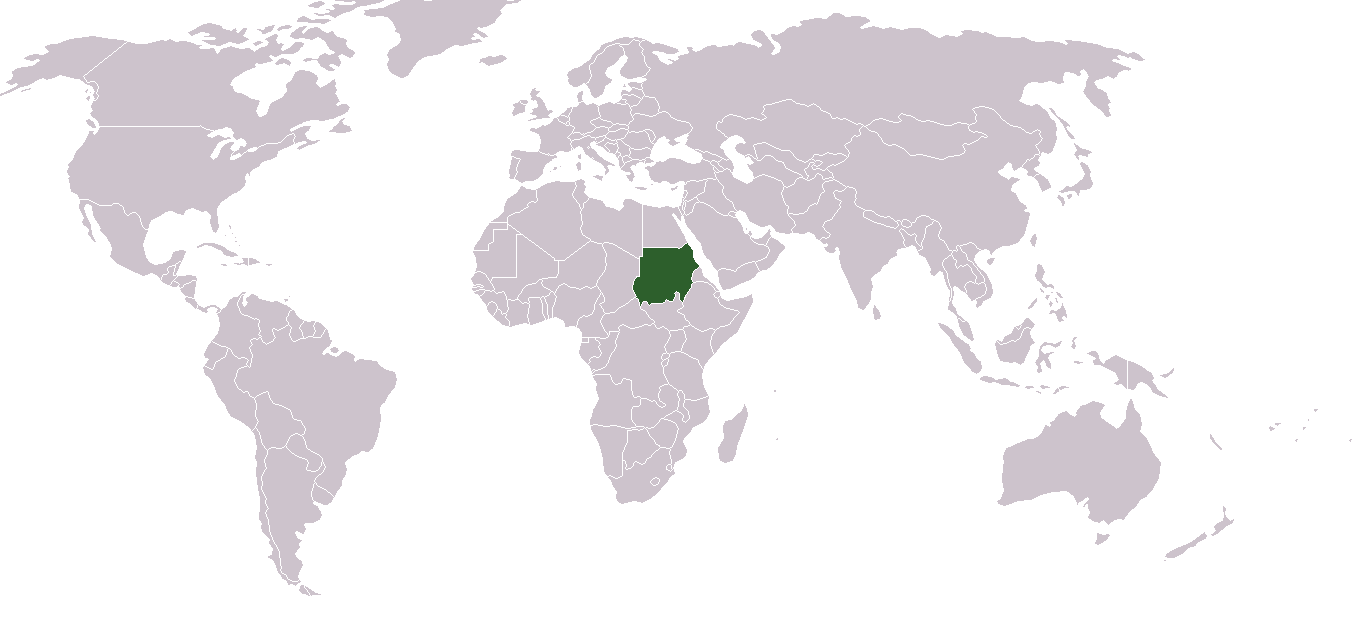
Sudan's location on the map of the world

The following outline is provided as an overview of and topical guide to Sudan:

Sudan – North Eastern African state, bordered by Egypt to the north, the Red Sea to the northeast, Eritrea and Ethiopia to the southeast, South Sudan to the south, the Central African Republic to the southwest, Chad to the west and Libya to the northwest. Internally, the river Nile divides the country into eastern and western regions. The population of Sudan is a combination of indigenous African inhabitants and descendants of migrants from the Arabian Peninsula. The overwhelming majority of the population today adhere to Islam.

== General reference ==
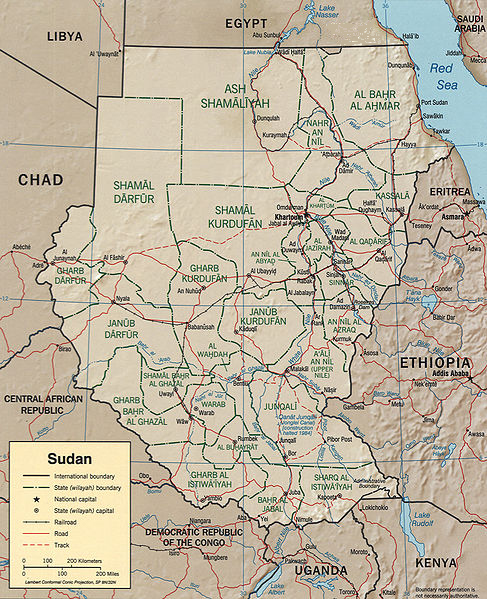
An enlargeable relief map of Sudan and South Sudan (before partition)

- Pronunciation:
- Common English country name: Sudan
- Official English country name: The Republic of Sudan
- Common endonym(s): As-Sudan السودان
- Official endonym(s): Jumhūriyyat as-Sūdān جمهورية السودان (Arabic)
- Adjectival(s): Sudanese
- Demonym(s): Sudanese
- ISO country codes: SD, SDN, 736
- ISO region codes: See ISO 3166-2:SD
- Internet country code top-level domain: .sd

== Geography of Sudan ==
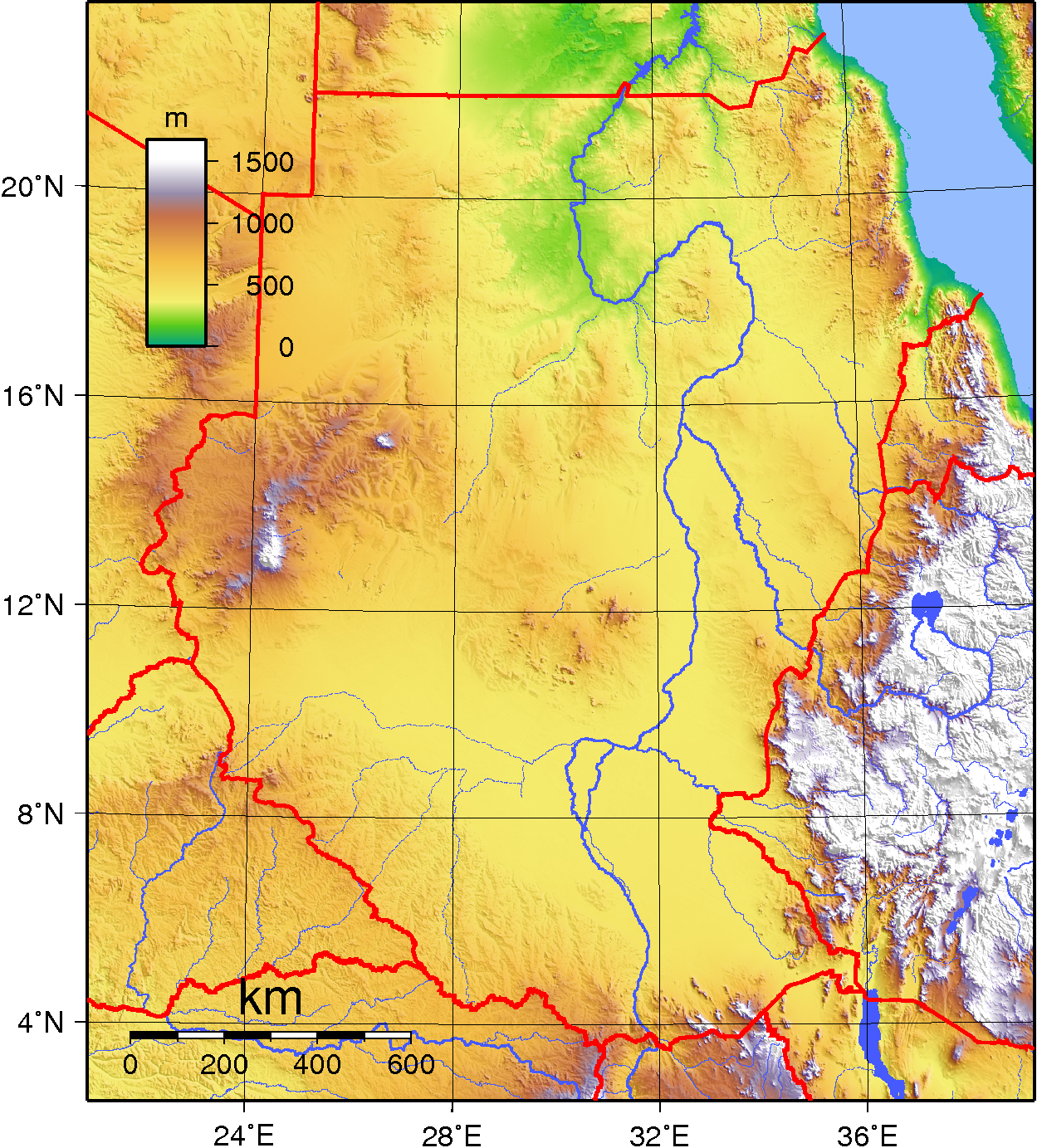
An enlargeable topographic map of Sudan and South Sudan (before partition)

Geography of Sudan

- Sudan is: a country
- Location
  - Sudan is situated within the following regions:
    - Northern Hemisphere and Eastern Hemisphere
    - Africa
      - North Africa
      - East Africa
      - partially within the Sahara Desert
    - Greater Middle East
  - Time zone: East Africa Time (UTC+03)
  - Extreme points of Sudan
    - High: Kinyeti 3,187 m (10,456 ft)
    - Low: Red Sea 0 m
  - Land boundaries: 6,751 km

Ethiopia 769 km
Chad 1,360 km
Egypt 1,273 km
Central African Republic 175 km
Eritrea 605 km
Libya 383 km
South Sudan 1 937 km

- Coastline: Red Sea 853 km

- Population of Sudan: 30,894,000 (2008) - 32nd most populous country
- Area of Sudan: 1,886,068 km^{2}
- Atlas of Sudan

=== Environment of Sudan ===
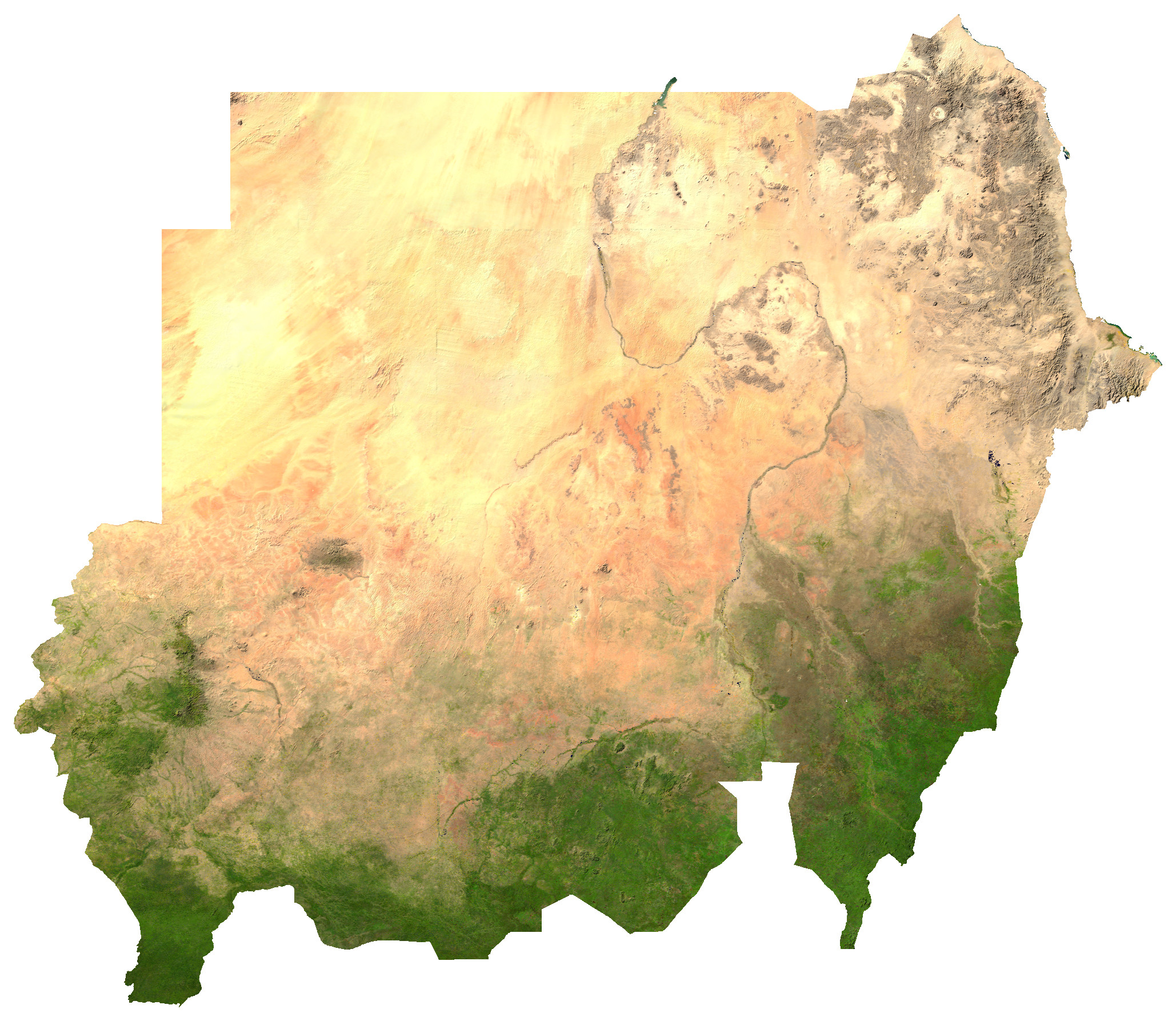
An enlargeable satellite image of Sudan

Environment of Sudan

- Climate of Sudan
- Environmental issues in Sudan
- Ecoregions in Sudan
- Wildlife of Sudan
  - Fauna of Sudan
    - Birds of Sudan
    - Mammals of Sudan

==== Natural geographic features of Sudan ====
- Glaciers in Sudan: none
- Mountains of Sudan
  - Volcanoes in Sudan
- Rivers of Sudan
- World Heritage Sites in Sudan

=== Regions of Sudan ===
Regions of Sudan

==== Ecoregions of Sudan ====
List of ecoregions in Sudan

- Ecoregions in Sudan

==== Administrative divisions of Sudan ====
Administrative divisions of Sudan

- States of Sudan
  - Districts of Sudan

===== States of Sudan =====
States of Sudan

- Blue Nile
- Al Jazirah
- Kassala
- Khartoum
- North Darfur
- North Kordofan
- Northern
- Al Qadarif
- Red Sea
- River Nile
- Sennar
- South Darfur
- South Kordofan
- West Darfur
- White Nile

===== Districts of Sudan =====
Districts of Sudan

The States of Sudan are subdivided into 133 districts.

=== Demography of Sudan ===
Demographics of Sudan

== Government and politics of Sudan ==
Politics of Sudan

- Form of government: authoritarian democracy
- Capital of Sudan: Khartoum
- Elections in Sudan
- Political parties in Sudan

=== Branches of the government of Sudan ===
Government of Sudan

==== Executive branch of the government of Sudan ====
- Head of state: President of Sudan, Abdel Fattah al-Burhan
- Head of government: Prime Minister of Sudan, Kamil Idris
- Cabinet of Sudan

==== Legislative branch of the government of Sudan ====
- Parliament of Sudan (bicameral)
  - Upper house: Senate of Sudan
  - Lower house: House of Commons of Sudan

==== Judicial branch of the government of Sudan ====
Court system of Sudan

=== Foreign relations of Sudan ===
Foreign relations of Sudan

- Diplomatic missions in Sudan
- Diplomatic missions of Sudan

==== Membership in international organizations ====
The Republic of Sudan is a member of:

- African, Caribbean, and Pacific Group of States (ACP)
- African Development Bank Group (AfDB)
- African Union (AU)
- Arab Bank for Economic Development in Africa (ABEDA)
- Arab Fund for Economic and Social Development (AFESD)
- Arab Monetary Fund (AMF)
- Common Market for Eastern and Southern Africa (COMESA)
- Council of Arab Economic Unity (CAEU)
- Food and Agriculture Organization (FAO)
- Group of 77 (G77)
- Inter-Governmental Authority on Development (IGAD)
- International Atomic Energy Agency (IAEA)
- International Bank for Reconstruction and Development (IBRD)
- International Civil Aviation Organization (ICAO)
- International Criminal Court (ICCt) (signatory)
- International Criminal Police Organization (Interpol)
- International Development Association (IDA)
- International Federation of Red Cross and Red Crescent Societies (IFRCS)
- International Finance Corporation (IFC)
- International Fund for Agricultural Development (IFAD)
- International Labour Organization (ILO)
- International Maritime Organization (IMO)
- International Monetary Fund (IMF)
- International Olympic Committee (IOC)
- International Organization for Migration (IOM)
- International Organization for Standardization (ISO)
- International Red Cross and Red Crescent Movement (ICRM)
- International Telecommunication Union (ITU)
- International Telecommunications Satellite Organization (ITSO)
- Inter-Parliamentary Union (IPU)
- Islamic Development Bank (IDB)
- League of Arab States (LAS)
- Multilateral Investment Guarantee Agency (MIGA)
- Nonaligned Movement (NAM)
- Organization of Islamic Cooperation (OIC)
- Organisation for the Prohibition of Chemical Weapons (OPCW)
- Permanent Court of Arbitration (PCA)
- United Nations (UN)
- United Nations Conference on Trade and Development (UNCTAD)
- United Nations Educational, Scientific, and Cultural Organization (UNESCO)
- United Nations High Commissioner for Refugees (UNHCR)
- United Nations Industrial Development Organization (UNIDO)
- Universal Postal Union (UPU)
- World Customs Organization (WCO)
- World Federation of Trade Unions (WFTU)
- World Health Organization (WHO)
- World Intellectual Property Organization (WIPO)
- World Meteorological Organization (WMO)
- World Tourism Organization (UNWTO)
- World Trade Organization (WTO) (observer)

=== Law and order in Sudan ===
Law of Sudan

- Constitution of Sudan
- Human rights in Sudan
  - LGBT rights in Sudan
  - Freedom of religion in Sudan
- Law enforcement in Sudan
- Narcotic Drugs and Psychotropic Substances Act (Sudan)

=== Military of Sudan ===
Military of Sudan

- Command
  - Commander-in-chief:
- Forces
  - Army of Sudan
  - Navy of Sudan
  - Air Force of Sudan

=== Local government in Sudan ===
Local government in Sudan

== History of Sudan ==
- Timeline
- Pre-independence governors
- Pre and early history
- Medieval
- Islamization
- Turkish occupation
- Mahdiyya
- Anglo-Egyptian occupation
  - History
- Independent Sudan
  - First Civil War
  - 1958 coup
- Nimeiry Era
  - 1969 coup
  - Communist coup
  - National Reconciliation
  - Second Civil War
  - 1985 coup
- First Transitional Military Council
- Kezan/Bashir Era
  - 1989 coup
  - RCCNS
  - War in Darfur
  - Peace process
  - Nomadic conflicts
  - Conflict in South Kordofan and Blue Nile
- United Nations Mission
- 2019–2021 transition to democracy
  - Revolution
  - 2019 coup
  - Second Transitional Military Council
  - Transitional Sovereignty Council
  - October 2021 coup
- Sudanese civil war (2023–present)

== Culture of Sudan ==
=== Visual and performing arts in Sudan ===
- Literature of Sudan
- Music of Sudan
- Cinema of Sudan
- Photography of Sudan
- Visual arts of Sudan
- Architecture of Sudan
- Fashion of Sudan

=== General culture of Sudan ===
- Cuisine of Sudan
- Languages of Sudan
- Media in Sudan
- Television in Sudan
- National symbols of Sudan
  - Coat of arms of Sudan
  - Flag of Sudan
  - National anthem of Sudan
  - Orders, decorations, and medals
- People of Sudan
- Public holidays in Sudan
- Religion in Sudan
  - Islam in Sudan
  - Christianity in Sudan
  - Hinduism in Sudan
- Archaeological sites in Sudan
- National Museum of Sudan

=== Sports in Sudan ===
- Football in Sudan
- Sudan at the Olympics
- Nuba fighting

== Displacement ==
- Refugees and internally displaced people of Sudan
  - Sudanese refugees in Chad
  - Sudanese refugees in Egypt
- Sudanese refugee crisis
  - El Fasher refugee crisis
  - Deportation of Eritreans from Sudan
  - Evacuation of foreign nationals during the Sudanese civil war
- Sudanese Americans
- Sudanese in Israel
- Tawila
- Zamzam camp

== Economy and infrastructure of Sudan ==
Economy of Sudan

- Economic rank, by nominal GDP (2007): 66th (sixty-sixth)
- Agriculture in Sudan
- Banking in Sudan
  - National Bank of Sudan
- Communications in Sudan
  - Internet in Sudan
- Companies of Sudan
- Currency of Sudan: Pound
  - ISO 4217: SDG
- Energy in Sudan
- Health care in Sudan
- Mining in Sudan
- Postage stamps and postal history of Sudan
- Tourism in Sudan
- Transport in Sudan
  - Airports in Sudan
  - Rail transport in Sudan

== Education in Sudan ==
Education in Sudan

== Health in Sudan ==
Health in Sudan

== See also ==
Sudan

- List of international rankings
- List of Sudan-related topics
- Member state of the United Nations
- Outline of Africa
- Outline of geography
