= List of newspapers in Sudan =

This is a list of newspapers in Sudan. It comprises both daily newspapers as well as general news magazines, published both by Sudanese journalists working in Sudan and abroad, in print and/or online version.

== Arabic language newspapers ==
=== A–M ===
- Akhbar Al Youm
- Al Ayaam
- Akhir Lahza
- El Baath El Sudani (print runs confiscated 11 times in early 2019 during 2018–19 Sudanese protests; editor-in-chief Mohamed Widaa assaulted on 24 July 2019; office raided on 29 July 2019)
- Goan (http://www.goansport.net)
- Khartoum Star (https://khartoumstar.com)
- Al Mshaheer
- Al-Mushahid Al-riyadiya (https://web.archive.org/web/20111119110704/http://www.mushahidsd.net/)

=== N–Z ===
- sudan independent
- Al-Nilin
- Al-Osboa
- Ray' al-Shaab
- Al-Ray al-Aam
- Radio Dabanga
- Al-Sadda (http://www.alsadda.net)
- Al-Sahafa (Sudan)
- Sudan Daily (https://sudandaily.org)
- Sudan Vision
- Sudanese Online (http://sudaneseonline.com)
- Sudanese Society (https://www.sudanesesociety.com)
- Al-Sudani (http://www.alsudani.info)
- Al-Taghyeer Newspaper

== English language newspapers ==
- Sudanese Voice (https://www.sudanesevoice.com)
- Khartoum Monitor
- Khartoum Star (https://khartoumstar.com/en)
- Sudan Daily (https://sudandaily.org/en)
- Al-Taghyeer Newspaper
- The Vigilant (1965-1969)
- 500 Words Magazine

== Bilingual Arabic/English news magazines ==
- Andariya magazine (digital cultural platform from Sudan, South Sudan & Uganda, cultural and sociopolitical features)

== See also ==
- Media of Sudan
- Telecommunications in Sudan
