= Ayam =

Ayam may refer to:

- Ayam (cap), a Korean hat
- Ayam (people), Kuwaiti citizens of Persian origins.
- Ayam, the Indonesian and Malay word for chicken, used in names of dishes and chicken or food-related entities:
  - Ayam Brand, food company
  - Ayam bumbu rujak, Indonesia traditional grilled chicken
  - Ayam gulai, Indonesian curry dish
  - Ayam goreng, Indonesian fried chicken
  - Ayam goreng kalasan, Indonesia traditional fried chicken
  - Ayam pansuh, Indonesian chicken dish
  - Ayam penyet, Indonesian traditional fried chicken
  - Opor Ayam, Indonesian coconut milk chicken dish
  - Soto ayam, a yellow spicy chicken soup with vermicelli
- Al Ayam ("The Days"), referring to several newspapers`:
  - Al Ayam (Bahrain)
  - Al Ayam (Malaysian)
  - Al Ayam (Sudan)
  - Al-Ayyam (disambiguation)
- Amur–Yakutsk Mainline - partially complete railway in Eastern Siberia.
