= Media of Sudan =

As of the early 2000s, Sudan had one of the most restrictive media environments in Africa. Sudan's print media since independence generally have served one of the political parties or the government in power, although there occasionally were outspoken independent newspapers.

There was more press freedom under civilian governments than during military regimes. Radio and television were always under much firmer government control, irrespective of the type of government.

During the 2023 war in Sudan, journalists and independent media organizations have been working under considerable threats, mainly caused by intimidation and hostility from the warring parties, political and ethnic animosity, as well as financial and psychological distress.

== Legal framework and censorship ==
The Interim National Constitution of 1986 provided an unrestricted right to freedom of expression, dissemination of information, and access to the press without prejudice to order, safety, or public morals “as determined by the law.” It added that the state guaranteed freedom of the press and other media “as shall be regulated by law in a democratic society.” Finally, the constitution stated that all media must abide by professional ethics, refrain from inciting religious, ethnic, racial, or cultural hatred, and must not agitate for violence or war. The constitution clearly left most of the implementation of press freedom to the passage of laws.

In 2003 President Omar al-Bashir proclaimed the lifting of censorship and the transfer of responsibility for monitoring the media from the National Security Organization to the 21-member National Press Council (NPC). The president of the republic selected seven members and the National Assembly chose five members. The Journalists’ Union elected seven members and leaders of the union selected the final two members. Transfer of responsibility for monitoring the media resulted in only marginal improvement because state security officials circumvented the NPC by relying on the government prosecutor in charge of subversive crimes. The Sudanese government continued to censor print and broadcast media, and journalists also practiced self-censorship.

== Radio ==
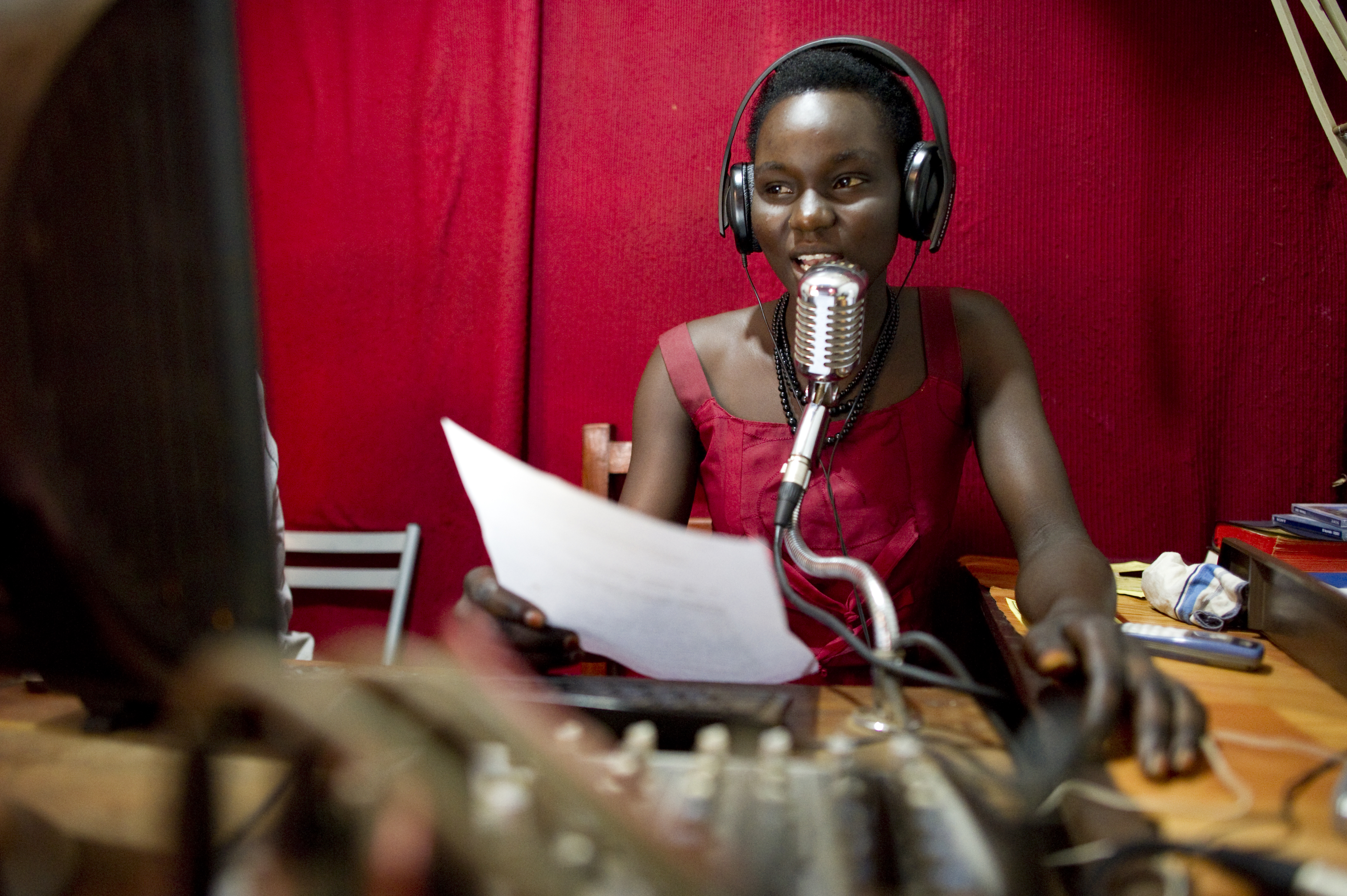
Radio broadcaster in Yei, 2010

First radio service began in 1940 in Sudan. As of the early 2000s, the government directly controlled radio broadcasting. In a country as large as Sudan, radio was especially important in disseminating information.

The Sudan National Radio Corporation, which dated back to 1940, broadcast a mixture of news, music, and cultural programs through national and regional networks in Arabic, English, French, and Swahili. There was only one private radio station in Northern Sudan; it was an FM station that broadcast music in Khartoum.

As of the early 2000s, several opposition and clandestine radio networks were in operation. The Voice of Sudan, operated by the opposition NDA, broadcast shortwave intermittently from neighboring Eritrea beginning in 1995 until the parties that made up the NDA returned to Sudan. The New Sudan Council of Churches had a weekly broadcast called the Voice of Hope produced in studios in Uganda and the Netherlands and transmitted via the Radio Netherlands relay station in Madagascar. In 2010, Sudan suspended the BBC’s license to broadcast in Arabic on local FM frequencies in four Northern cities, including Khartoum.

Another clandestine radio station, Radio Dabanga, began broadcasting in December 2008 using shortwave transmitters of Radio Netherlands Worldwide. Government-run Radio Omdurman ran jamming signals to attempt to interfere with reception during Radio Dabanga's broadcast times, but these jamming efforts were ineffective, in part because Radio Dabanga used two shortwave frequencies.

The Sudan Radio Service, developed by the Education Development Center, supported by the U.S. Agency for International Development, began broadcasting from Nairobi, Kenya, in July 2003. Sudanese producers broadcast programs in 10 Sudanese languages, focusing on civic education, health, agriculture, and education, as well as on music and entertainment.

Capitol Radio FM is a private, Khartoum-based music radio station, broadcasting only in English.

== Television ==
Sudan officially began television transmission in 1963. In the early years, it only reached a short distance from Khartoum. As of 2011, the Sudan National Broadcasting Corporation operated two television channels; both reflected government policies. Sudan had a military censor to ensure that the news did not contradict official views. Satellite dishes were common in affluent areas and pan-Arab television stations were popular. In addition to domestic and satellite TV services, there was a subscription cable network, which directly rebroadcast uncensored foreign news and other programs. The government shut down the Al-Jazeera bureau late in 2003 and arrested the bureau chief for alleged false programming and poor analysis of atrocities in Darfur. The bureau chief went to prison, but Al-Jazeera subsequently reopened the office.

== Newspapers ==
=== History ===
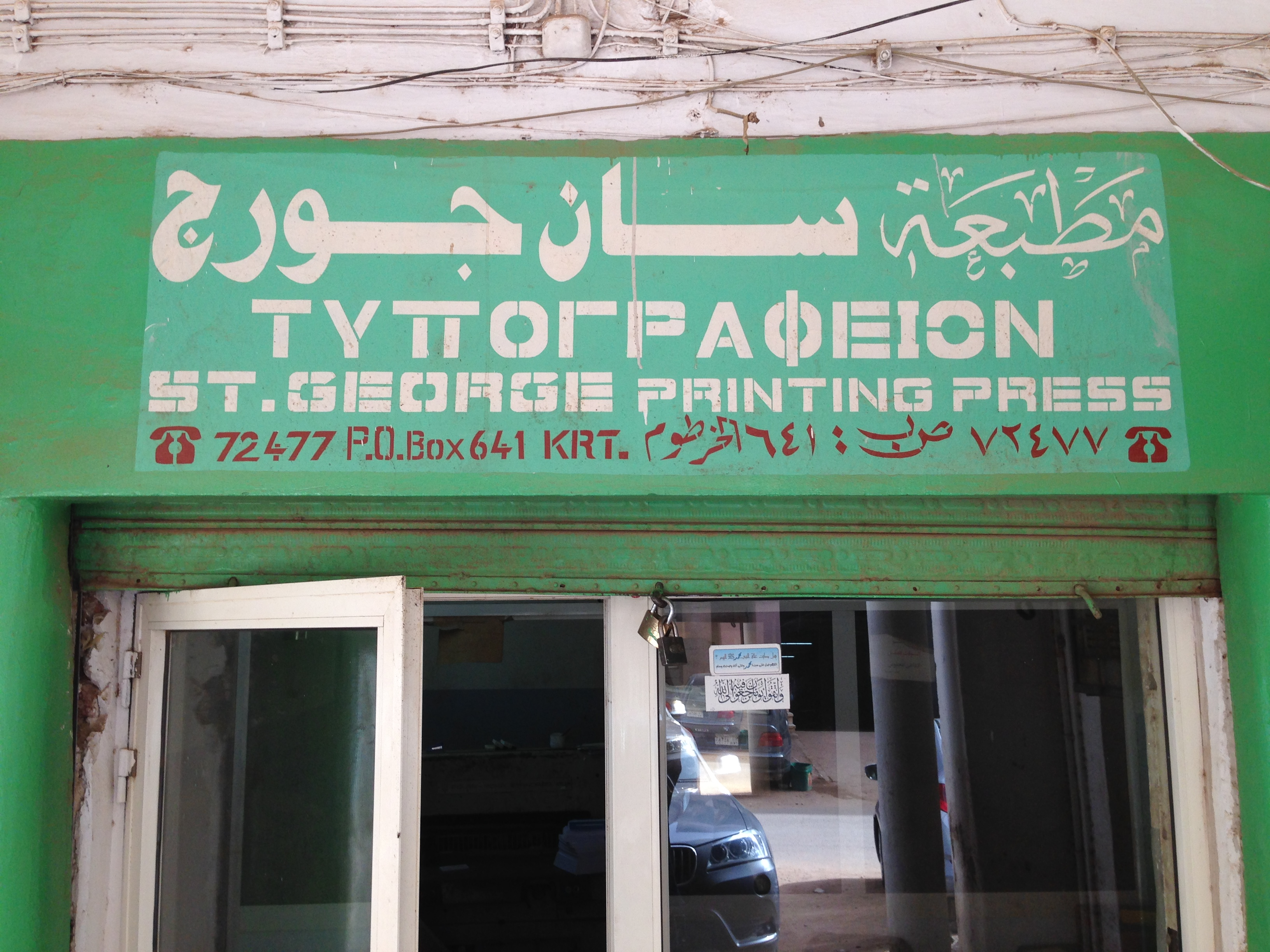
St. George Printing Press in Zubeir Pasha Street, Khartoum, one of the oldest in Sudan. Until the 1970s it was run by three Sudanese Greek sisters.

The first newspaper in Sudan, called El Sudan, began publication on 23 September 1903. With two pages in English and another two in Arabic and two editions per week, it was produced and edited by Syrian businessmen who also imported the first printing press into the country. There were hardly any Sudanese readers, and this semi-governmental paper catered mainly to British, Egyptian and Syrian government officials and merchants. Presenting both foreign and local news and editorials, it received international news through Reuters in London, and carried reports from the provinces as well as on economic developments. The second newspaper, named Ra'id el Sudan/Sudan Herald, was published in 1912 by Greek businesspeople, who also owned the Victoria Press. Initially, it was edited by Syrians and Egyptians and, among daily news, it presented literature and poems by the first generation of Sudanese poets, such as Sheikh el Banna, Ahmed Muhammad Saleh and Tawfik Saleh Gibril. Its first Sudanese editor was the well-known poet and journalist Abdul Raheem Glailati. By this time, an important factor for the development of modern newspapers and magazines was the spread of modern educational institutions, like the Gordon Memorial College in Khartoum and other non-religious schools in major cities like Omdurman or Wad Madani. Following an article criticising the poor living conditions of Sudanese, Ra'id el Sudan was closed in 1918, and the first fully Sudanese newspaper, Hadarāt al-Sudan, started in February 1919. After their official visit in London, three eminent leaders Ali al-Mirghani, Abd al-Rahman al-Mahdi, and Sherif Yussuf el Hindi took over the publication, and it became the first Sudanese publication with a political and nationalist orientation. The paper published several articles calling for public education for girls, among other improvements to the educational system.

In 1934, the fortnightly magazine El Fajr (The Dawn) was founded by "young men revolting against traditional thinking". One of their aims was to merge European and Sudanese cultures, and to "dispel causes of ignorance and hatred". Because of its support for literary expression, El Fajr became an important place for the first Sudanese short stories.

=== Since independence ===
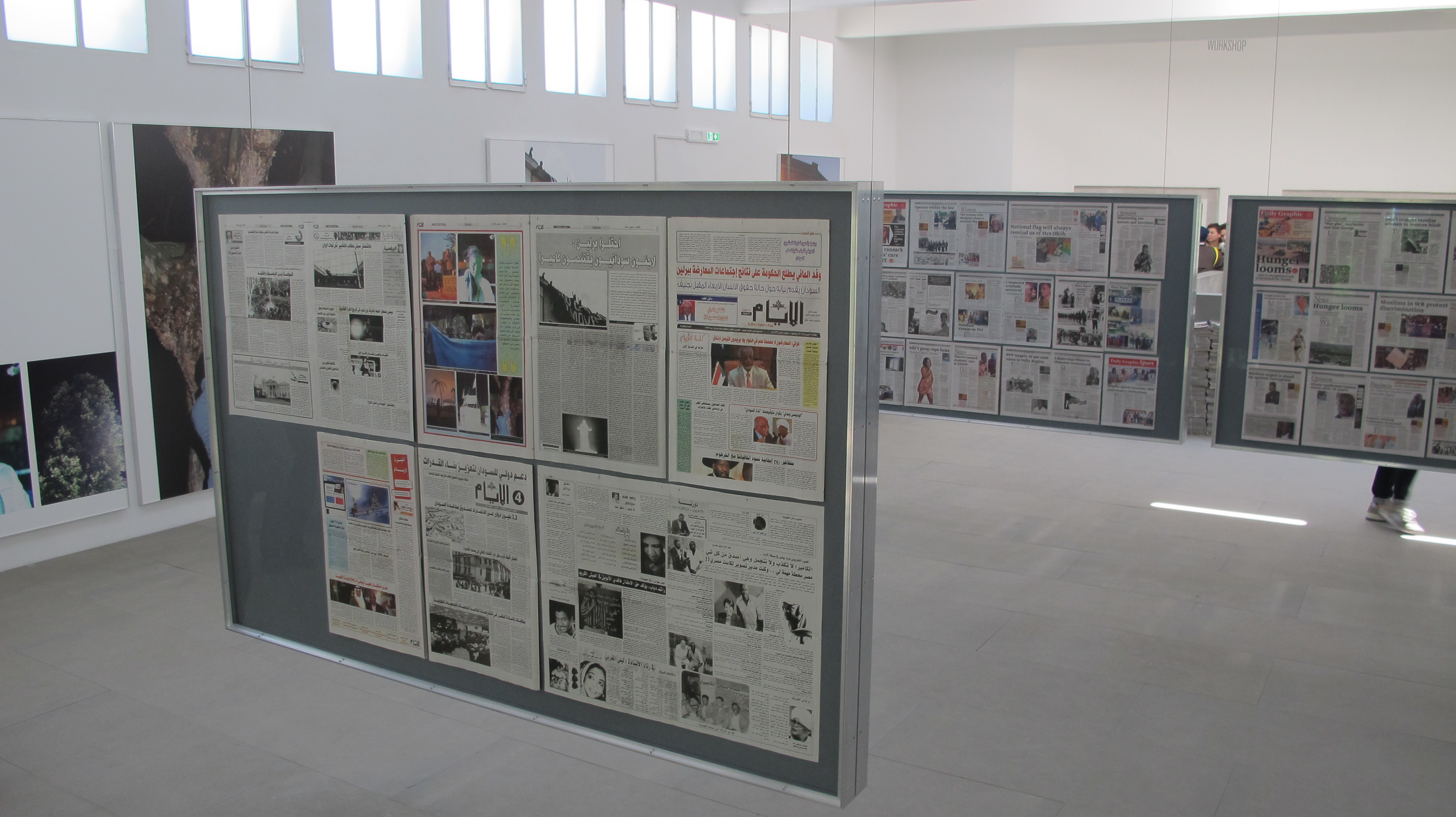
"The Citizen" exhibition by German art photographer Tobias Zielony containing excerpt from Sudanese news outlets

The official Sudan News Agency (Suna) was established in 1971 and continues to distribute information in Arabic, English, and French.

Before the 1989 coup, Sudan had a lively press. There were 22 daily papers, 19 in Arabic and three in English, published in Khartoum. In total, Sudan had 55 daily or weekly newspapers and magazines. In 1989, the Revolutionary Command Council banned all of them and dismissed more than 1,000 journalists. Slowly, the al-Bashir government allowed private dailies to return to publication, although they were all subject to censorship. Some of them periodically experienced harassment, including the jailing of journalists, seizure of newspapers, and suspension of publication.

After the announced end of censorship on all Sudanese newspapers in July 2003 and a brief improvement in press freedom, a number of independent publications again experienced intimidation, interruption, and arrest of their editors. Reporters Without Borders stated that the government ordered seven Arabic-language newspapers not to print certain articles “out of protection for journalists.” In the 2010s, the government of Sudan sought to control the press through ownership rather than simply censorship. The National Intelligence Security Service (NISS) purchased the country's two most influential independent newspapers, Al-Sahafa and Al-Kartoum. Following these purchases, the NISS owned 90% of the previously independent newspapers in the country.

Estimated total newspaper circulation in 2005 was 23 papers for each 1,000 persons. The Arabic-language press was much more important than the English-language media. Al-Sahafa was a leading daily Arabic-language paper as of 2011, and was then often critical of the government; however, it was purchased by the NISS in 2013. The independent daily Al-Ayam, which was periodically ordered closed for critical reporting of the government, had a daily circulation of 18,000 to 20,000 copies per day. The largest Arabic-language daily was Akhbar Al-Youm. It had strong links to the government and distributed 30,000 to 35,000 copies per day. Al-Rayaam, with a daily circulation of about 18,000, was a private, daily Islamist paper with strong links to the government, but also had columnists who were anti-government. The government funded the pan-Arab Al-Hayat, which had close ties to Vice President Ali Osman Taha.

Other Arabic-language dailies included Al-Wifaq (pro-government and anti-West), Al-Khartoum (purchased by the NISS in the early 2010s), Al-Sharia Al-Siyasi (pro-government), Al-Watan (independent), Al-Sudani (independent with a large readership in the diaspora), Al-Intibaha (anti-SPLM but supported secession of South Sudan), Rai Al-Shaab (mouthpiece of al-Turabi’s PCP), and Akhir Lahza (usually pro-government). In 2010 security personnel shut down the offices of Rai Al-Shaab. Another newspaper is al-Anba, which is owned by the government. The newspaper Alwan was shut down in 2020 by the new Sudanese government, following the Sudanese revolution and the 2019 coup.

In 2007, the leading English-language daily was the Khartoum Monitor, with a distribution of 3,000 to 3,500 copies per day. It experienced periodic harassment. This independent paper tended to reflect the views of Southerners. Sudan Vision was a progovernment paper with a daily circulation of about 3,200 copies. The Citizen supported the views of the SPLM and distributed about 2,000 copies per day. The Sudan Tribune was an Internet paper from Paris that tended to be critical of the NPC. In 2008 the NPC suspended the publishing license of both the Citizen and Sudan Tribune.

=== Since the Sudanese revolution of 2018/19 ===
After 30 years of military government under Omar al-Bashir in 1989, the first independent union for Sudanese journalists was established in August 2022, comprising more than 1000 members. Since the Sudanese revolution of 2019 and the establishment of a transitory government, journalists could work under less restrictions than before, but after the military seized power again in a coup in October 2021, journalists have been threatened and arrested. According to the president of the union, their aims are freedom of speech, a minimum wage, health and social insurance. Further, and for the first time, the union demands equal pay for women and men, paid maternity leave and leading positions in newspapers for women journalists.

Reuters, Agence France Press (AFP) as well as Al Jazeera and other news agencies have offices and corresponding journalists in Khartoum.

== Journalism during the 2023 war in Sudan ==
During the 2023 Sudan conflict, news magazine Dabanga Radio TV Online published a joint statement by 17 Sudanese media and human rights organizations about the critical state of freedom of the media in Sudan. Relating to the period from April 15, 2023, to August 15, 2023, the statement emphasised "the perilous situation faced by Sudanese journalists who have become collateral victims caught between opposing factions."

Journalist El Baqir Faisal, general coordinator of Journalists for Human Rights was quoted stating "What distinguishes this statement is the leaders of 17 Sudanese press institutions presenting a unified front for the first time on the war, as well as issues of protection and safety of journalists, and freedom of the press and expression." A founding member of the Sudanese Women’s Media Network stressed that the statement included cases of gender-based violence (GBV) against women journalists in conflict zones. She also stressed the call for accountability and media campaigns against hate speech and fake news. Speaking for the Sudanese Journalists Syndicate, Abdel Moneim Abu Idris said the main reasons of the statement were "the deteriorating conditions in which journalists have been living, and the continuous violations and repeated attacks, whether on their homes or workplaces."

The dire circumstances have resulted in loss of life, injuries, imprisonment, and the flight of numerous journalists to neighbouring countries. Media organisations have been abandoned or directly targeted, leading to a media blackout in conflict zones. The statement highlights the urgent need for both conflicting parties to immediately halt hostilities, grant journalists’ safe access to conflict areas, and ensure their protection.

— Joint statement by Sudanese media institutions and press organisations, August 2023,

In the 2023 report In the Shadow of Violence: The Pressing Needs of Sudanese Journalists, German media organization MICT published their findings of an in-depth study of 213 Sudanese journalists faced with the ongoing war in Sudan. This report was compiled with the assistance of the Al Adwaa Media and Journalism Services Centre, the Sudanese Journalists Syndicate (SJS), the Sudanese Journalists Network (SJN), the Global Forum for Media Development (GFMD) and the International Press Association of East Africa (IPAEA).

It highlighted the difficult situation of journalists in Sudan, ranging from personal threats to their freedom of expression. Further, it stressed the importance of protecting journalists' professional and independent research and publications as well as their crucial role in shaping local and global perceptions of Sudan’s current state. In particular, the journalists' answers to the questionnaire stressed the growing intimidation and hostility toward journalists, often based on political and ethnic animosity, the economic collapse of a free press in Sudan, frequent financial and psychological distress and the wish to relocate to safer working conditions both in Sudan or abroad.

== Cinema and movie production ==
Cinema in Sudan goes back to the time of the Anglo-Egyptian period. After the decline of film making from the 1980s onwards, cinema and public interest in film shows have shown a revival since the 2010s.

== Social media ==
Based on his studies in the mid 2010s of active social media users from urban Sudan on the social impact of internet and mobile communication, with a focus on changing established patriarchal norms, relations between the sexes, as well as between young people and their parents’ generation, Albrecht Hofheinz, a scholar on Middle Eastern history and sociology, published an academic paper on the use and changing attitudes of Sudanese users of social media. He found that young people are "often impatient with the pace of change in their society, while at the same time professing that the new technologies have enabled them, in their own lives, to break established norms, to expand the realm of their private sphere, and to assert their own voice."

On January 23, 2025, South Sudan's government directed telecommunications firms to block access to social media platforms, including Facebook and TikTok, for up to three months. This decision, effective from Wednesday night, was made in response to escalating revenge violence within the country. The National Communication Authority (NCA) cited recent upheaval in Sudan, where graphic videos depicting attacks on South Sudanese refugees in Wad Madani, Gezira state, were circulated on social media, leading to unrest in South Sudan. The NCA emphasized that the content violated local laws and posed significant threats to public safety and mental health, particularly among vulnerable groups. Major telecom companies, including MTN and Zain, have begun implementing the directive. However, the ban has faced widespread criticism from South Sudanese citizens, who view it as censorship and a violation of digital rights.

In South Sudan, authorities lifted the ban on Facebook and TikTok after videos of alleged killings in Sudan sparked violence. They emphasized balancing content regulation with protecting citizens' rights.

== See also ==
- Telecommunications in Sudan (including Internet in Sudan)
- Photography of Sudan
- Cinema of Sudan
- National Council for Press and Publication (Sudan)
