= Madiha Abdalla =

Sudanese journalist and editor

Madiah Abdalla
- Citizenship: Sudan
- Occupations: Journalist, editor, human rights activists
- Organization: Sudanese newspaper El Meidan

Madiah Abdalla is a Sudanese journalist and the first female chief editor of the Sudanese newspaper El Meidan since 2011, the Sudanese Communist Party newspaper. She is among the pioneer women in journalism following the steps of women's rights activists, such as Fatima Ahmed Ibrahim in the early forties, who issued the Women's Voice newspaper.

== Career ==
Abdalla started her career as a journalist at the El Meidan newspaper in 1985. She then worked for different newspapers, such as Alayam. Abdalla also wrote a number of columns in El Meidan after the Comprehensive Peace Agreement CPA in Sudan.

== Work ==
Abdalla is a women's rights activist, calling for women's equality and strives to reduce the gender discrimination gap in Sudan. She has written articles about women's issues in different online portals, such as the popular forum Sudaneseonline.

== Arrest and court case ==
As a result of her writing, Abdalla has been subject to detention and faced trial in April 2017. In another case in 2014, where Abdalla faced accusations by the Sudan National Intelligence and Security Service (NISS) of publishing false news, she was found guilty.
