= SudaPost =

Governmental agency in Sudan

Sudanese Postal Services Co. Ltd
- Trade name: SudaPost
- Native name: بريد السودان
- Company type: State-owned
- Industry: Postal services, courier
- Founded: 27 June 2009
- Headquarters: Al Siteen Street, Khartoum, Sudan
- Services: Letter post, parcel service, EMS, delivery, Financial services
- Website: sudapost.sd

Sudapost (Arabic: بريد السودان), officially Sudanese Postal Services Co. Ltd, is the public operator responsible for postal service in Sudan.

== See also ==
- Communications in Sudan
