= Al Wefaq (disambiguation) =

Al Wefaq or Al Wifaq (Arabic: الوفاق, lit. 'The Concord') may refer to:

- Al Wefaq, Bahraini political party
- Al Wifaq (organization), Moroccan Jewish nationalist organization
- Al Wifaq (newspaper), Sudanese newspaper
