= Zeinab Mohammed Salih =

Sudanese freelance journalist

- زينب محمد صالح
- Born: Khartoum, Sudan
- Education: City, University of London, Cardiff University
- Occupation: freelance journalist
- Years active: 2009–present
- Known for: Reporting from conflict zones across Sudan, South Sudan, Chad, Central African Republic, Libya, and East and Central Africa
- Awards: 2024/25 Visiting Arab Journalist Fellow, Wilson Center, US; 2025 Rainforest Investigations Fellow, Pulitzer Center, US

Zeinab Mohammed Salih (Arabic: زينب محمد صالح, born in Khartoum, Sudan) is a Sudanese freelance journalist, working mainly on political, human rights, social and gender-related issues in Sudan and neighbouring countries. Reporting from conflict zones across Sudan, South Sudan, Chad, Central African Republic, Libya, and East and Central Africa, she has published numerous reports for national Sudanese as well as for international news media, such as The Guardian, The New York Times, The Independent, BBC News, Financial Times and Al Jazeera.

== Biography ==
Salih earned an MA degree in international politics from City University of London and in international journalism from Cardiff University in the United Kingdom. Ahead of the Sudanese presidential 2010 elections and the 2011 referendum on southern Sudanese self-determination, Salih joined The Niles project in 2009, a German government-funded transnational newspaper, published in Arabic and English. She was one of a group of young freelance journalists from northern and southern Sudan who acquired professional training to report about current and cultural affairs. In 2017, she also worked as journalist at the United Nations Headquarters in New York City.

Among Salih's more than 100 articles published by The Guardian up to March 2022, there are several reports about the Sudanese Revolution. In particular, she has written about pro-democracy activists, atrocities committed by the Sudanese military or security forces, the role of women in the Sudanese revolution, rape and lack of justice after the killing of a teenage girl. In a 2019 article for the BBC News published before the revolution, she reported about Sudanese women using a Facebook group to share photographs of as yet unidentified sexual perpetrators, where the members of the group then tried to identify and denounce the perpetrators publicly. Among other issues, Salih has written on Al-Jazeera News about ongoing human rights violations in Sudan's Darfur region, and for BBC News about racial abuse and glorification of past slave traders in Sudan.

Salih founded the Sudanese Network for Human Rights Information and has also reported on political and human rights issues in neighbouring South Sudan, Egypt, Chad, Central African Republic, Libya, and Ethiopia. During the 2023 Sudan conflict, The Observer published her memoir about challenges of reporting about Sudan under the military regime of Omar al-Bashir and the following transition towards democracy in Sudan. Faced by the ongoing war, she explained, why she and her family did not want to leave the country despite the ongoing battles in the metropolitan area and why she continued reporting from the ground, even in life-threatening situations.

== Reception ==
In 2024 and 2025, Salih was awarded fellowships by the Wilson Center as well as by the Pulitzer Center, both in Washington, D.C., US. During this time, she wrote several articles about the ongoing Sudan conflict, including the role of regional and international actors. In 2026, she was honoured with the Knight International Journalism Award of the International Center for Journalists (ICFJ).

In the 2019 book Pioneers, Rebels and a few Villains. 150 years of journalism in Eastern Africa, Salih was described as a "tireless freelance reporter about and beyond the Sudanese Revolution."

== Awards and recognition ==
- 2024/25 Visiting Arab Journalist Fellow, Wilson Center, US
- 2025 Rainforest Investigations Fellow, Pulitzer Center, US
- 2026 ICFJ Knight International Journalism Award, US
