= Al-Mushahid Al-riyadiya =

- Language: Arabic
- Website: http://www.mushahidsd.net

Al-Mushahid Al-riyadiya is a newspaper in Sudan.

== See also ==
- List of newspapers in Sudan
