= Mohammed Taha Mohammed Ahmed =

Sudanese journalist (1965–2006)

Mohammed Taha Mohammed Ahmed (Arabic: محمد طه محمد أحمد; 1965 – 6 September 2006) was a Sudanese journalist and editor of the newspaper Al-Wifaq.

== Life ==
Taha was known for writing articles critical of many groups in the country, and in 2000 survived an assassination attempt after criticizing the National Congress Party. In 2005 his paper reprinted an article casting doubt on the ancestry of the prophet Mohammed. In 2006 he was kidnapped and his body found decapitated in Khartoum.

== Murder trial ==
In November 2007, nine men were found guilty of killing Taha. On April 13, 2009, the Sudanese authorities executed the convicted criminals by hanging at Kobar Prison in Khartoum. According to the police authorities, the motives of the murder were political, ethnic, and financial.
