= Al Ayam =

Al Ayam (Arabic for "The Days") may refer to:

- Al Ayam (Bahrain), newspaper
- Al Ayam (Sudan), newspaper

== See also ==
- Al-Ayyam (disambiguation)
