= Television in Sudan =

Television in Sudan has a low penetration of around 17%, as many households cannot afford the cost of a satellite dish, and terrestrial television is the dominant platform. There are no private terrestrial television stations, and the government operates Sudanese Radio and Television Corporation.

== History and present ==
Sudan officially began television transmission in 1963. In the early years, it only reached a short distance from Khartoum. By the early 1970s, one in every 300 inhabitants owned a television set.

Sudan has 18 terrestrial channels, just one of which, Blue Nile TV, is not wholly state-owned. Sudan TV is the main terrestrial channel. There are eight free-to-air direct-to-home channels headquartered in Sudan, of which five are privately owned, two are government owned and one has mixed ownership. Pay-TV penetration is negligible in the country.

=== Censorship ===
Sudan TV stations are restricted by a military censor to ensure that the news do not contradict official views and perceived cultural values. Satellite dishes are common in affluent areas and pan-Arab television stations are popular. In addition to domestic and satellite TV services, there was a subscription cable network, which directly rebroadcast uncensored foreign news and other programs.

The government shut down the Al-Jazeera bureau late in 2003 and arrested the bureau chief for alleged false programming and poor analysis of atrocities in Darfur. The bureau chief went to prison, but Al-Jazeera subsequently reopened the office.
