= Al-Sahafa (newspaper) =

Sudanese Arabic daily newspaper

Al-Sahafa الصحافة
- Owner: National Intelligence Security Service
- Founded: 1961; 64 years ago
- Language: Arabic

Al-Sahafa (in Arabic الصحافة meaning The Press) is an Arabic daily newspaper published in Sudan.

== History and profile ==
Al Sahafa was established in 1961. In its initial phase the paper had a left-wing political stance. The paper was suspended in different periods, including in 2003 because it carried an Ethiopian Airlines advertisement that mentioned the drinking of alcohol. Often critical of the government, Al-Sahafa distributed 25,000 to 27,000 copies daily as of 2011.

In September 2013, the Sudanese National Intelligence Security Service bought the paper.

== See also ==
- List of newspapers in Sudan
