= Sudatel =

Telecommunication company in Sudan

SUDATEL Group
- Type: Telecommunications and Internet service provider
- Industry: Telecommunications ICT
- Founded: 1993
- Headquarters: Khartoum
- Key people: Magdi Taha (President and CEO)
- Products: Telecommunications services Internet services
- Website: http://www.sudatel.sd/

Sudatel is a telecommunications and Internet service provider in Sudan. The company is responsible for the construction and maintenance of Sudan's telecom infrastructure. Sudatel is more than 60% owned by the Sudanese government; the remainder being owned by private interests. Its stock is listed on the Bahrain Stock Exchange.

The company is active in the development of the Al Zariba / North Kurdufan area.

== Ownership Structure and Key Information on Sudatel Telecom Group ==
Sudatel Telecom Group is a Public Joint Stock Company and one of the leading Information and Communication Technology (ICT) providers in the region, serving customers across Sudan and Africa.

Sudatel was established in 1993, and since then has experienced steady growth, expanding from a local market player into regional markets

Sudatel is listed on both the Khartoum Stock Exchange and the Abu Dhabi Securities Exchange (ADX).

43% of Sudatel shares are traded in Abu Dhabi Securities Exchange (ADX), while the government of Sudan holds 22.6% of Sudatel shares. In addition, more than 14 regional banks, 80 companies, several regional organizations such as Arabsat, and individuals from Sudan and another 27 nationalities hold shares in the company.

== Geographical Presence and Services Portfolio ==
Sudatel offers a wide range of ICT services, including:

=== 1. Mobile and Fixed Telecommunications Services ===
- Sudani

=== 2. Data Center Hosting Services (including PaaS & SaaS) ===
Sudatel owns one of the largest Tier III+ data centers in Africa, in addition to another Tier III data center in Port Sudan. Through these facilities, the company provides:

- Hosting services
- Software as a Service (SaaS)
- Platform as a Service (PaaS)

=== 3. Marine and Terrestrial Connectivity ===
Sudatel is a key player in international connectivity, leveraging its strategic geographic location in Sudan. It is a member of several subsea and terrestrial cable consortiums, including:

- EASSy Subsea Cable – connects East Africa to Southern Africa, landing in 9 countries (South Africa, Madagascar, Mozambique, Comoros, Tanzania, Kenya, Djibouti, Somalia, and Sudan)
- SAS1 and SAS2 Subsea Cables – link Africa to Asia via connectivity through STC in Saudi

To support this international connectivity, Sudatel has invested in more than 25,000 km of terrestrial optical fiber cables and over 11,000 km of subsea cables.

== Sudatel’s Associates ==
- SUDASAT – provides satellite backhaul and enterprise connectivity services; Sudatel owns 60% of the shares
- Electronic Banking Systems (EBS) – the national operator of electronic payment systems; Sudatel owns 30%
- SUDANI FINTECH – a newly established financial technology company; Sudatel owns 60%
- Arab Submarine Cable Company (ASC) – specializes in operating subsea cable systems; Sudatel owns 50%

Mr. Magdi Mohamed Abdallah Taha has served as the President and Chief Executive Officer (CEO) of Sudatel Telecom Group since 2020 and continues to lead the company to date
