= Al-Sudani (newspaper) =

Sudanese local newspaper

Al Sudani السوداني
- Founded: 1980; 45 years ago
- Language: Arabic
- Headquarters: Khartoum
- Circulation: 305,000 (2004)
- Website: Al Sudani

Al-Sudani (in Arabic السوداني, meaning The Sudanese) is an Arabic daily newspaper in Sudan.

== History and profile ==
Al Sudani was established in 1980 and the Carnegie Endowment gives its 2004 circulation as 305,000 copies.

Its headquarters is in Khartum.

Al Sudani is described as a paper which claims to be independent, but is known to be supported by the regime of the country. However, the paper has been suspended by the Sudanese authorities in different periods and its editor-in-chief and another journalist writing for the paper were arrested in 2006.

== See also ==
- List of newspapers in Sudan
