= Telecommunications in Sudan =

Telecommunications in Sudan includes fixed and mobile telephones, the Internet, radio, and television. Approximately 12 million out of 45 million people in Sudan use the Internet, mainly on smartphones and mobile computers.

== Pre-privatization era (up to 1994) ==
Sudan had telecommunication services as early as 1897. All of the organizations established to deliver telecommunications services were government-owned. They were, for all practical purposes, entities with little or no operational and financial autonomy and little control over their own destiny. Despite many development plans and efforts, the state of telecommunication sector in the country remained extremely poor through 1994. At that time, Sudan had one of the lowest penetration rates (0.23%) even by regional standards.

== Privatization era (1994 and beyond) ==
The Three-Year Economic Salvation Programme (1990–1993), adopted by the Government of Sudan, emphasized the role of telecommunications in the socio-economic development process and called for the removal of the monopolistic environment in the sector and for the involvement of the private sector—whether local or foreign—in the telecommunication sector as well as in other sectors to overcome the persistent shortfalls in investment and performance. As an outcome of this programme, the structure of the telecommunication sector in the country at present is as follows:

a) The Ministry (Ministry of Information & Communications): in charge of policies and legislation.
b) The Regulator (National Telecom Corporation, NTC): in charge of regulatory functions.
c) The licensed operators and service providers: in charge of the operation of licensed networks and of the provision of services.

Providers

Operator/service provider	Date of licence	Technology	Network Capacity	Country wide Coverage	Subscribers
Zain Sudan	14 August 1996	3.5G (GSM and WCDMA)+ 4G (LTE)	Unknown	120 locations	12,000,000+
MTN Sudan	25 October 2003	3G+ (GSM) 4G (LTE)	1,100,000	35 locations	1,788,237
Sudani One	2 February 2006	3.75G (CDMA) 4G (LTE)	4,000,000	145 locations	3,000,000
Canar Telecommunications	April 2005	3G (CDMA)	Unknown	unknown	unknown

== Evolution of the telecommunication sector (1994 to September 2006) ==
Fixed Services

SUDATEL	19 April 1993	TDM/MPLS	1,493,674	200 locations	411,000
CANAR (Limited Mobility)	11 October 2004	IP-MPLS/CDMA	250,000	5 locations	104,720

Growth of fixed and mobile communications

		1994	2000	2004	2005	2006
Fixed	Capacity x 1000	150	416	1500	1500	1500
	Subscribers x 1000	64	386	1929	680	515
Mobile	Capacity x 1000	—	20	1250	2000	4800
	Subscribers x 1000	—	1	1050	1866	3370

== Telephones ==
- Calling code: +249
- International call prefix: 00
- Main lines: 425,000 lines in use, 101st in the world (2012).
- Mobile cellular: 27.7 million, 38th in the world (2012).
- Domestic: well-equipped system by regional standards; cellular communications started in 1996 and have expanded substantially with wide coverage of most major cities, microwave radio relay, cable, fiber optic, radio telephone communications, tropospheric scatter, and a domestic satellite system with 14 earth stations (2010).
- Communications cables: EASSy and FLAG / FALCON fiber-optic submarine cable systems (2010).
- Satellite earth stations: 1 Intelsat (Atlantic Ocean), 1 Arabsat (2010).

== Internet ==
By 2011, internet access was widely available in urban areas, but limited by lack of infrastructure in rural areas.

In 2019, following the 2019 Sudanese coup d'état, the Sudanese government began launching nationwide internet shutdowns.

Since 2023, the ongoing Sudanese civil war has seen the continuation of disruption to internet availability within Sudan. Disruptions have been caused by both damage to infrastructure caused by fighting and intentional government shutdowns and restrictions. Outages, both localized and nationwide, are frequent. Government-ordered nationwide internet shutdowns have occurred repeatedly throughout 2023, 2024, 2025, and 2026. These shutdowns have led to difficulty delivering humanitarian aid and coordinating emergency assistance.

As of 2012/2013:

- Internet users: 12 million users, 46th in the world; 21.0% of the population, 142nd in the world (2012).
- Fixed broadband: 18,472 subscriptions, 131st in the world; 0.1% of population, 172nd in the world (2012).
- Wireless broadband: 5.6 million subscriptions, 31st in the world; 16.4% of the population, 78th in the world (2012).
- Internet hosts: 99, 211th in the world (2012).
- IPv4: 283,904 addresses allocated, less than 0.05% of the world total, 6.3 addresses per 1000 people (2012).
- Top-level domain: .sd

=== Internet censorship and surveillance ===
Sudan was listed as engaged in substantial Internet filtering in the social and Internet tools areas, in selective filtering in the political area, and as no evidence of filtering in conflict/security area by the OpenNet Initiative in August 2009. Sudan openly acknowledges filtering content that transgresses public morality and ethics or threatens order. The state's regulatory authority established a special unit to monitor and implement filtration; this primarily targets pornography and, to a lesser extent, gay and lesbian content, dating sites, provocative attire, and many anonymizer and proxy Web sites.

The government monitors Internet communications, and the National Intelligence and Security Services (NISS) reads e-mail messages between private citizens. The National Telecommunications Corporation blocks some Web sites and most proxy servers deemed offensive to public morality. While there generally are no restrictions on access to news and information Web sites, authorities regularly block access to YouTube. During the June and July 2012 antigovernment demonstrations, authorities blocked access to several popular online discussion forums. Security agencies also arrested several bloggers during this period, and commentators speculated the government used social media to track and arrest protesters.

The interim national constitution provides for freedom of thought, expression, and of the press "as regulated by law"; however, the government severely restricts these rights. Individuals who critici£e the government publicly or privately are subject to reprisal, including arrest. Journalists are subjected to arrest, harassment, intimidation, and violence due to their reporting. The government, including NISS, practices direct prepublication censorship of all forms of media. Journalists also practice self-censorship. NISS resorts to legal action against journalists, bringing libel lawsuits for stories critical of the government and security services. The Supreme Court in December 2011 overturned a lower court decision against several of the accused journalists, but NISS petitioned for a review of the higher court's decision. The Supreme Court rejected the NISS appeal in September 2012, but the security service continued to pursue defamation cases against several other journalists. The interim national constitution and law prohibit arbitrary interference with privacy, family, home, or correspondence, but the government routinely violates these rights. Emergency laws in Darfur and Blue Nile states legalize interference in privacy, family, home, and correspondence. Security forces frequently conduct searches without warrants and target persons suspected of political crimes. The government monitors private communication and movement of individuals without due legal process.

In 2019, Internet services were blocked in Sudan from June 3 to July 7.

== Internet service providers (ISPs) ==
Internet services have evoloved over the years. The country’s ISP market is regulated by the National Telecommunications Corporation (NTC), which oversees licensing, spectrum allocation, and internet governance. Sudan's ISP sector is dominated by a few key players, including:

- Sudatel Group, one of the oldest and largest telecommunications companies in Sudan. Sudatel provides broadband services through its subsidiary Sudani. It offers ADSL, FTTH, and mobile internet services across major cities.
- Zain Sudan, a subsidiary of the Kuwaiti-based Zain Group. Zain Sudan is a major mobile network operator that also offers mobile broadband services via 3G and 4G LTE technologies.
- MTN Sudan, part of the MTN Group headquartered in South Africa. MTN Sudan provides mobile internet access and has expanded its 4G LTE services in urban areas.
- Canar Telecom, originally owned by Etisalat (UAE). Canar was a prominent broadband and fixed-line service provider in Sudan, focusing on corporate internet services and VoIP solutions. Its role has diminished in recent years following changes in ownership and service coverage.

== Radio and television ==
- Radio: directly controlled by the Sudanese Government (2007); a private radio station is in operation (2007); 22 AM and 1 shortwave (HF) broadcast stations.
- Radio sets: 13.7 million.
- TV: directly controlled by the Sudanese Government (2007); 95 broadcast and relay stations.
- TV sets: 6.7 million.

Radio and television broadcasting are operated by the government. Sudan Television operates three stations located in Omdurman, Al Jazirah, and Atbarah. The major radio station of the Sudan National Broadcasting Corporation is in Omdurman, with a regional station in Juba for the south. Some foreign shortwave radio broadcasts are available, and a private FM radio station continues to operate. The government restricts UN radio. In addition to domestic and satellite television services, there is a private cable network that directly rebroadcasts uncensored foreign news and other programs.

The government, including the National Intelligence and Security Services (NISS), continues to practice direct prepublication censorship of all forms of media. TV has a permanent military censor. The government directly controls radio and television and requires that both reflect government policies. Following the 1989 coup, the Revolutionary Command Council for National Salvation (RCC-NS) dismissed several broadcasters from Sudan Television because their loyalty to the new government and its policies was considered suspect.

In opposition to the official broadcast network, the Sudan People's Liberation Army operated its own clandestine radio station, Radio SPLA, from secret transmitters within the country and facilities in Ethiopia. Radio SPLA broadcasts were in Arabic, English, and various languages of the south. In 1990, the National Democratic Alliance began broadcasts on Radio SPLA's frequencies.

Another clandestine radio station, Radio Dabanga, began broadcasting in December 2008 using shortwave transmitters of Radio Netherlands Worldwide. Government-run Radio Omdurman ran jamming signals to attempt to interfere with reception during Radio Dabanga's broadcast times, but these jamming efforts were ineffective, in part because Radio Dabanga used two shortwave frequencies.

== See also ==
- Media of Sudan, includes information on radio, television, and newspapers.
- Sudan TV, Sudan National Broadcasting Corporation (SNBC), government-owned and operated Arabic language national television network.
- Sudatel, a telecommunications and Internet service provider, more than 60% owned by the Sudanese government with the remainder owned by private interests.
