= Al-Ayyam =

Al-Ayyam may refer to:

== Newspapers ==
- Al-Ayyam (Ramallah)
- Al-Ayyam (Yemen)
- Al-Ayyam (Damascus), main Damascus daily until 1963

== Other ==
- The Days (Arabic: Al-Ayyam), the autobiography of Egyptian writer Taha Hussein

== See also ==
- Al Ayam (disambiguation)
