= Al-Sadda =

Sudanese daily newspaper

Al Sadda الصدى
- Type: Daily sports newspaper
- Language: Arabic
- Headquarters: muzamil abulgassim
- Website: http://www.alsadda.net

Al Sadda (in Arabic الصدى meaning The Echo) is a daily sports newspaper published in Sudan. In September 2011, the paper along with five other sports newspapers was suspended by the Sudan Press Council for allegedly violation of press law.
