= Sudan TV =

National television network of Sudan

Sudan TV Sudan National Broadcasting Corporation (SNBC)
- Type: Broadcast and satellite television network
- Country: Sudan
- Headquarters: Omdurman, Sudan; Temporary: Port Sudan, Sudan

Programming
- Language: Arabic

Ownership
- Owner: Sudan National Broadcasting Corporation

History
- Founded: December 1962
- Launched: 1962

Links
- Website: sudan-tv.net

Sudan TV (Arabic: تلفزيون السودان) is a Sudanese national television network owned and operated by the Sudan National Broadcasting Corporation (SNBC), a state-owned broadcaster in Sudan. Sudan TV is one of six television networks in the country and it broadcasts in the Arabic language.

== History ==
In December 1962, Sudan TV started broadcasting in the Khartoum region, and it was operated regularly in 1963. It was broadcast for at least 38 hours during the first few years. The signal was accessible in the three municipalities of greater Khartoum, Omdurman and Khartoum Bahri. One year later, General Mohamed Talat Fareed established the station as a national broadcaster and signed a contract with a West German broadcaster to provide technical support, cameras and recorders.

In the 1970s, Sudan TV expanded its transmission range, when the General Company for Wireless and Wired Telecommunications built a satellite station. In 1976, Sudan TV started transmitting in colour.

Analog broadcasting finally-ended in 2020, On 15 April 2023, the station abruptly stopped broadcasting when it was attacked by the paramilitary Rapid Support Forces (RSF) at the start of the Sudanese civil war (2023-present). Its building was occupied by the RSF, who were subsequently besieged and evicted following heavy fighting by the Sudanese Armed Forces in March 2024. The Ministry of Information said that the fighting had left the station devastated, with "extensive fire damage to the radio buildings, destruction of television studios, and the complete loss of new external broadcasting equipment" from theft or fire, in addition to the theft of all its vehicles. It temporary moved its studios and headquarter in Port Sudan.

== Programming ==
Programming includes news, prayers, Qur'an recitation and a variety of entertainment, such as children's programmes, talent contests, dramas, sports and documentaries. A military censor works with Sudan TV to make sure the programmes reflect government policy.

== Stations ==
Sudan TV broadcasts on two channels and is also available via satellite.

== See also ==
- Communications in Sudan
- Media of Sudan
