= SudaneseOnline =

Sudanese online newspaper

SudaneseOnline "سودانيز أونلاين"
- Type: Online newspaper
- Owner: Bakri Abubakr
- Publisher: Sudanese Online
- Editor: Bakri Abubakr
- Founded: 1999; 27 years ago
- Headquarters: Peoria, Arizona, United States
- Website: sudaneseonline.com

SudaneseOnline (Arabic: سودانيز أونلاين) is an online bilingual newspaper for people from Sudan and South Sudan, based in Phoenix, Arizona, United States. The website was established in November 1999 by Bakri Abubakr, a Sudanese national residing in the US, with news and information about Sudan and South Sudan, and more than 500 archives in its library.

== Content ==
The newspaper includes a section for news and press releases, covering local, regional, Sudanese and world news, an Opinions section, an image library with over 1500 images hosted by Pinterest and an audio-visual library with over 5000 videos hosted by YouTube, with video clips from classic and modern Sudanese music. The audio-visual library also contains an interactive archive of Sudanese folklore and historical events as well as several TV talk shows.

SudaneseOnline focuses on the political and socioeconomic climate in Sudan and South Sudan, with Sudanese news and views and a blog for Sudanese in the diaspora.

The website is listed in the United States Library of Congress. SudaneseOnline has published several thousand articles that dealt with Sudan political affairs, regional and international issues.

In addition, SudaneseOnline aims to enable its readers to establish friendship with others, and has assisted in retrieving family ties among some of its visitors. It has facilitated the marriages of 14 couples, e.g. the marriage of Alaa Tmbis and Dalia.

== Campaigns ==
Members of the website collected more than eight thousand US dollars for the medical treatment of Sana'a Al-Amin Awadalkarim. They also financially contributed in the medical treatment of the Sudanese poet, the late Mahjob Sharrif and Ghada Noury (in Jordan) and the Sudanese child Mohammed Mahmoud Sayed Alyas. Readers of SudaneseOnline signed an appeal addressed to the Sudanese authorities to stop an execution verdict against the poet Abddul Monem Rahman, who was arrested by the Sudanese National Intelligence and Security Service in Damazin after the eruption of the Second Sudanese Civil War in Blue Nile province together with his nineteen colleagues who have been detained and transferred from Singa prison to Kober prison in the capital, Khartoum. Readers of the website collected more than ten thousand US dollars for the publication of a book written by the Sudanese politician AlKhatim Adlan titled: "What is the Exile? What is the Homeland?"

In addition, readers of SudaneseOnline and some Sudanese living abroad set up a network of reporters for Al-Rahil Awatef Ahmad Isaac from several countries, and a volunteer society with a $10 monthly membership fee.

== In academic research ==
Several Sudanese researchers and students conducted post-graduate researches about Sudaneseonline. These researchers included :

- Dr. Saifuddin Hassan AlAwad who obtained his PhD degree from the International Islamic University of Malaysia based on his dissertation titled: "Mutual Priorities of Conventional and Modern Mass Media- SudaneseOnline website as a case study"
- Dr. Abu Obeida Abdel Qader Obaid Mudawi who obtained his PhD degree from Ohio University –United States based on his dissertation titled: "The Role of SudaneseOnline in mass communication of Sudanese citizens around the world".

== Blockage, hacker attacks and censorship ==
SudaneseOnline has been exposed several times to blockage and hacking attacks from Sudanese government authorities. On 10 July 2004 the Arab Network for Human Rights Information issued a statement condemning blockage of SudaneseOnline by Sudanese government authorities, saying that it considered such blockage as a violation of freedom of opinion and expression according to human rights conventions, and an infringement of the right of information dissemination. The network pleaded with the Sudan government to immediately stop blockage of SudaneseOnline pursuant to article 19 of the Civil and Political Rights Convents, which guarantee provision and dissemination of information and ideas among people.

The writings and books of several Sudanese intellectuals and writers published and downloaded in SudaneseOnline have been blocked and hacked by the Sudanese government authorities. These writers included the novelist Muhsin, Khalid whose books have been confiscated in Sudan and severely criticized by the local media.

SudaneseOnline is supported solely by advertising.

== Awards ==
The Students Union of Khartoum University (KUSU) awarded its annual prize in 2004 to Sudaneseonline for its support to Sudanese students' demands.
