= Al-Wifaq (newspaper) =

Sudanese daily newspaper

Al Wifaq is a Sudanese Arabic-language daily newspaper. As of 2011, it was pro-government and anti-West.

In 2006, the Sudanese government ordered the murder of Mohamed Taha, the newspaper's editor. An Islamist extremist group claimed responsibility for the murder.
