= Radio Dabanga =

Sudanese shortwave radio station, TV and online news magazine

Radio Dabanga, Dabanga - Radio TV Online
- Sudan
- Frequency: 0430-0500 UTC: 7315 kHz + 15550 kHz 1530-1600 UTC: 13800 kHz + 15550 kHz

Programming
- Languages: Sudanese Arabic (Former languages: Darfuri Arabic, Fur, Masalit, Zaghawa)

Ownership
- Owner: Stichting Dabanga Foundation, https://www.dabangasudan.org/en/about-us

History
- First air date: 1 December 2008
- Former names: Radio Darfur

Links
- Webcast: dabangasudan.org/en/broadcasts
- Website: dabangasudan.org

Radio Dabanga (Arabic: راديو دبنقا) (part of Dabanga – Radio TV Online is a radio and online news service that serves Sudan. The shortwave radio has been broadcasting since 1 December 2008. Current broadcasts last for a total of two hours each day. Radio Dabanga introduced an online radio feed in April 2023, broadcasting twenty-four hours a day. Dabanga also publishes its content on Satellite TV, Facebook, WhatsApp, YouTube, and SoundCloud. Depending on the medium, Radio Dabanga produces news in Sudanese Arabic and/or English. Shortwave radio remains the mainstay of the radio station; a high percentage of all Sudanese people are illiterate, a number that is relatively higher in Sudan’s remote areas and camps for displaced people. Many people here have no lifeline to the outside world other than telephone and radio, so it is Radio Dabanga’s mission to provide this. The radio programming is also carried on Dabanga’s satellite TV channel. Both the shortwave and satellite TV can broadcast without censorship and/or technical interference from within Sudan.

== Broadcasting media ==
=== Radio ===
Radio broadcasting is split into the Morning News and Evening News. The morning news is broadcast from 0430 to 0500 UTC, at a frequency of 7315 and 15550 kHz and evening news is broadcast from 1530 to 1600 UTC, at a frequency of 13800 and 15550 kHz. This means that broadcasts reach Sudan between 07.30 and 08.00 in the morning and between 18:30 and 19:00 in the evening.

In addition to the news bulletins, Dabanga broadcasts Sudan Today in the evening, which contains analysis and longer content on the main news issues of the day. Alongside the news programs, content focuses on social, economic and political issues with programs such as Scales of Justice (transitional justice), Kandaka (gender), Youth Issues, and Sudan File (political analysis and interviews).

Broadcasts are made in Sudanese Arabic.

=== Television ===
Radio Dabanga has been broadcasting its TV satellite channel on Eutelsat since 18 February 2018 on frequency 11354 GHz. The TV Satellite broadcasts the latest radio programs 24 hours per day, showing the latest headlines of Radio Dabanga in text on-screen.

=== Online ===
Radio programs, which are broadcast via shortwave radio and satellite TV, are also available on Dabanga's Facebook page and YouTube channel. In addition Radio Dabanga can be heard 24-hours a day 7-days a week via an online stream.

Radio Dabanga produces news articles in Arabic, which are published on the Arabic website, social media and WhatsApp groups. Arabic news is often translated and reworked to suit an international audience on the English language part of the website and social media platforms.

== Reporting ==
Radio Dabanga's editorial HQ is based in exile in The Netherlands. Until 2012 the editorial team operated out of facilities at Radio Netherlands Worldwide, a public radio and television network based in the city of Hilversum. It then operated from the offices of Free Press Unlimited in Amsterdam. In 2020 Dabanga moved to and operated from its own HQ building in The Netherlands.

Before 2013, Radio Dabanga's main focus was conflict areas such as Darfur and the Blue Nile, producing independent news and relevant information for people of Darfur, including internally displaced persons and refugees. Since then the station increasingly shifted to being a reliable source of information for people in all parts of Sudan, covering a wide range of events and issues.

The editor-in-chief is Kamal Elsadig, overseeing a small group of reporters who work at the central desk in The Netherlands. The radio station receives news from people in the field. These stringers get in contact with the team with information about specific events, which the team then uses to verify and compile as news.

Audience participation is a significant source of information, as listeners call the radio studios with their own stories and tips. Increasingly, the editors use WhatsApp as a tool to receive, verify and publish news from interested individuals and specialist groups such as medics and civil servants in Sudan.

== Audience ==
Radio Dabanga radio broadcasts reach 2.3 million individual listeners per day (the population of Sudan is around 40 million) according to a listener survey conducted in 2009. The survey was held among 1,582 respondents over the age of 18 in cities, towns, and Darfur’s refugee camps. The satellite TV channel is watched by an average of 1 million people per day in Greater Khartoum. Overall, the 2009 survey and spot checks in Khartoum revealed that Radio Dabanga reaches 6.5 million people per week via shortwave radio and satellite TV. More information about the online audience of Radio Dabanga is presented in an infographic on their website.

== Supporters ==
Radio Dabanga was founded in 2008 by a coalition of Sudanese journalists, a number of international NGOs and the movers behind the Dutch campaign ‘Tot Zover Darfur’, including Stichting Vluchteling, Pax for Peace and Stichting Doen. It was operated and facilitated by the Dutch NGO Free Press Unlimited in the Netherlands. In 2021 Radio Dabanga became an independent organisation, Stichting Dabanga Foundation, brand name 'Dabanga - Radio TV Online'. As an exiled media house Dabanga is still based in The Netherlands, with the aim of 'returning' to Sudan once conditions allow.

== Controversies and state censorship ==
While Radio Dabanga has a large audience in Sudan, the organization has been criticized by the Sudanese government in the past. The station has survived a number of government efforts to take TV Satellite and shortwave radio broadcasts off-air, including attempts at jamming and prosecution of reporters.

=== Television blocking ===
Radio Dabanga's TV satellite channel was first set up in 2013 with Arabsat. After being taken down by the company in 2015 due to requests by the Sudanese government, Radio Dabanga began broadcasting with Nilesat instead. At the time, Arabsat stated that "Radio Dabanga is considered an enemy of the Sudanese government, it's not about a few controversial news items but about the whole station."

Radio Dabanga's channel was taken down from Nilesat in February 2018 due to a new request from the Sudanese government. Faisal El Bagir of the network of Journalists for Human Rights stated at the time: "This measure illustrates that the regime does not tolerate independent opinions and voices, especially when it comes to the voices of those who would otherwise never be heard." After that, Radio Dabanga has been broadcasting via Eutelsat, a Paris-based broadcasting company.
