= Al Ayam (Sudan) =

Sudanese newspaper

Al Ayam is a daily Sudanese newspaper. It is the oldest independent newspaper in Sudan.

Al Ayam was founded by Mahjoub Mohamed Salih in 1958. Twice closed by the Sudanese government during the 1960s, it became a product of it in 1970. Salih did not publish it again until 1986. It was again closed from 1989 to 2000. In 2004, it was again closed, primarily for its reporting on the crisis in Darfur. The Sudanese minister of justice ordered prosecutors in March 2004 to end indefinite closure of newspapers without trial. Nevertheless, Al-Ayamreported instances of harassment by security forces in 2006.

As of 2011, Al-Ayam had a daily circulation of 18,000 to 20,000 copies per day.
