= List of crossings of the Nile River =

== Crossings from Khartoum to the Mediterranean Sea ==
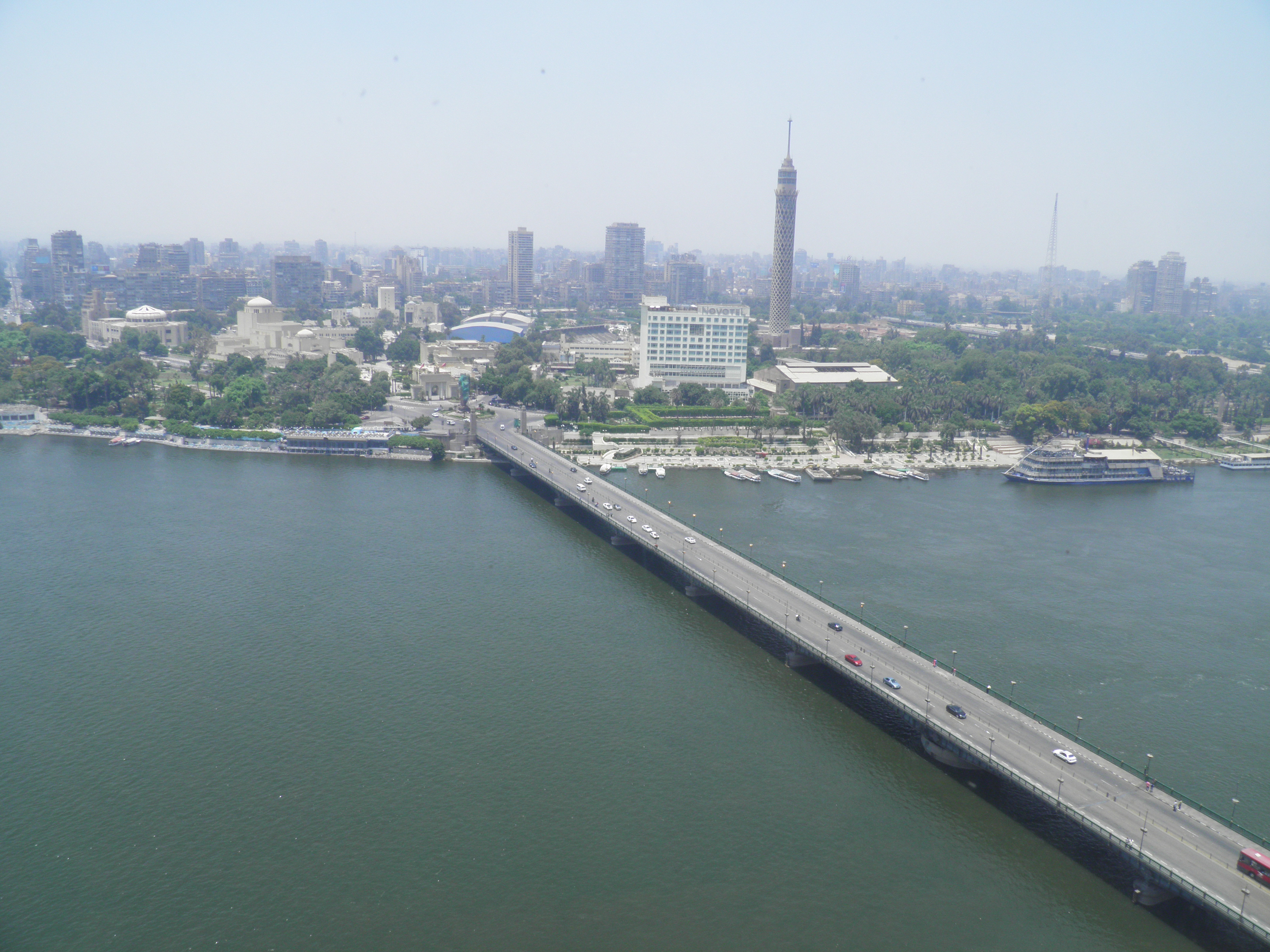
View of the Qasr El Nil Bridge in Cairo, with Gezira Island in the background

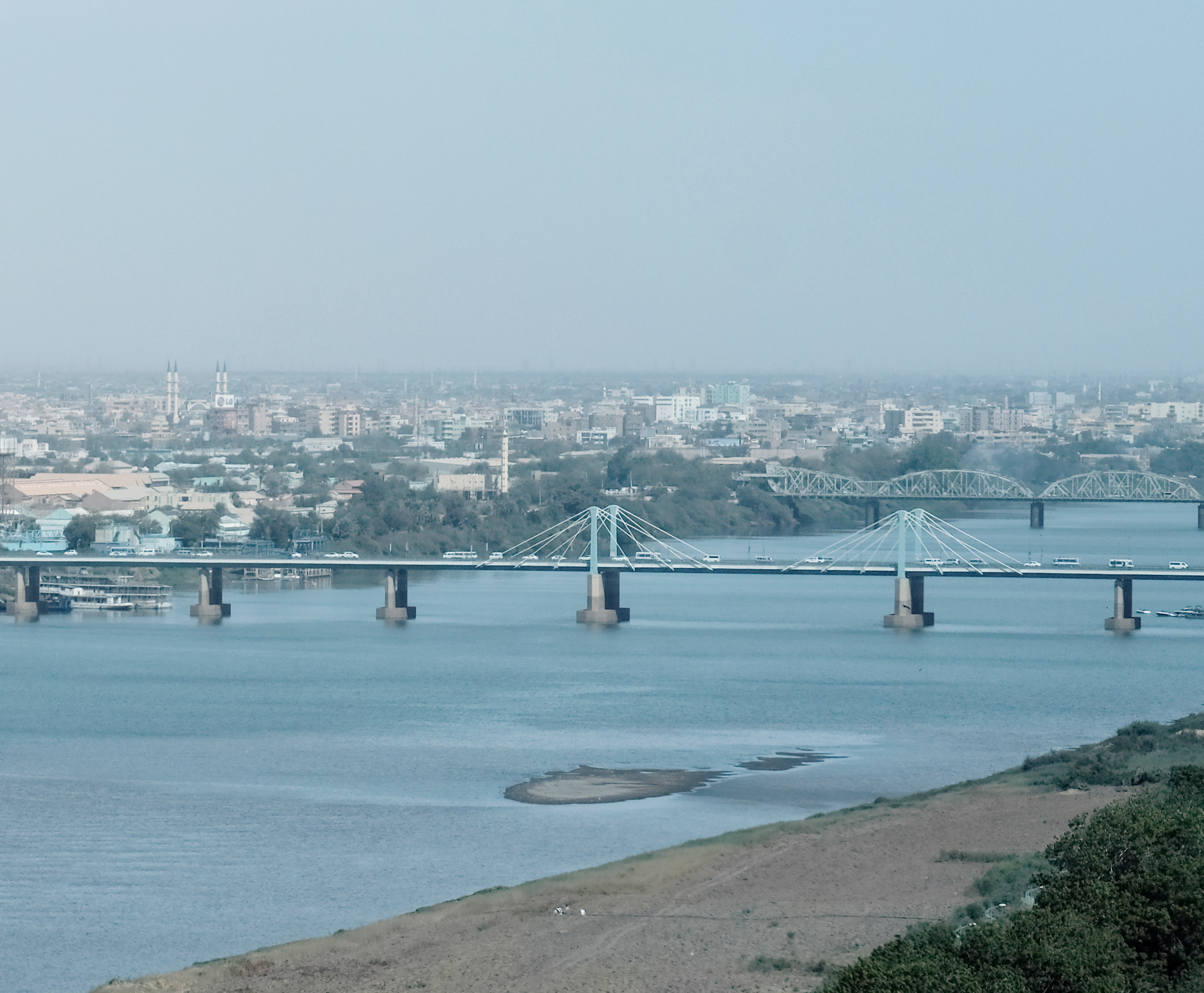
El Mek Nimr Bridge in Khartoum

The following bridges cross the Blue Nile and connect Khartoum to Khartoum North:

- Mac Nimir Bridge
- Blue Nile Road & Railway Bridge
- Burri Bridge
- Elmansheya Bridge
- Soba Bridge

The following bridges cross the White Nile and connect Khartoum to Omdurman:

- White Nile Bridge
- Victory Bridge, also known as El Fitihab Bridge

The following bridges cross from Omdurman to Khartoum North:

- Hafaya Bridge

The following bridges cross to Tuti from Khartoum state's three cities:

- Tuti Bridge (previously known as the Khartoum North-Tuti bridge)

Other bridges:

- Shandi Bridge, Shendi
- Atbarah Bridge, Atbarah
- Merowe Dam, Merowe
- Merowe Bridge, Merowe
- Aswan Bridge, Aswan
- Luxor Bridge, Luxor
- Suhag Bridge, Suhag
- Assiut Bridge, Assiut
- Al Minya Bridge, Minya
- Al Marazeek Bridge, Helwan
- First Ring Road Bridge (Moneeb Crossing), Cairo
- Abbas Bridge, Cairo
- University Bridge, Cairo
- Qasr al-Nil Bridge, Cairo
- 6th October Bridge, Cairo
- Abu El Ela Bridge, Cairo (removed in 1998)
- New Abu El Ela Bridge, Cairo
- Imbaba Bridge, Cairo
- Rod Elfarag Bridge, Cairo
- Second Ring Road Bridge, Cairo
- Banha Bridge, Banha
- Samanoud Bridge, Samanoud
- Mansoura 2 Bridges, Mansoura
- Talkha Bridge, Talkha
- Shirbine high Bridge
- Shirbine Bridge
- Kafr Sad – Farscor Bridge
- International Coastal Road Bridge
- Damietta high Bridge, Damietta
- Damietta Bridge, Damietta
- Kafr El Zayat Bridges, Kafr El Zayat
- Zefta Bridge, Zefta

== Crossings from Jinja, Uganda to Khartoum ==
- Source of the Nile Bridge, Jinja, Uganda
- River Nile Railway Bridge, Jinja, Uganda
- Nalubaale Bridge, Jinja, Uganda (Formerly Owen Falls Bridge)
- Karuma Bridge, Karuma, Uganda
- Pakwach Bridge, Uganda
