= History of the Dinka people =

The Dinka are a Nilotic ethnic group who primarily live in Sudan and South Sudan. Their history originates in what is now Gezira, continuing to the modern day.

== Origins ==
The Dinka originated from the Gezira in what became Sudan. In ancient times, this area was occupied by the Kingdom of Kush.

=== Medieval times ===
In medieval times, the Dinka occupied a region ruled by the kingdom of Alodia (also called Alwa), a Christian, multi-ethnic empire in Nubia. Living in its southern periphery and interacting with the Nubians, the Dinka absorbed a sizable amount of Nubian vocabulary. From the 13th century, with the disintegration of Alodia, the Dinka began to migrate out of Gezira, fleeing slave raids, military conflict, and droughts.

Conflict over pastures and cattle raids occurred between Dinka and Nuer as they battled for grazing land.

=== Dinka migration from Gezira and Alodia ===
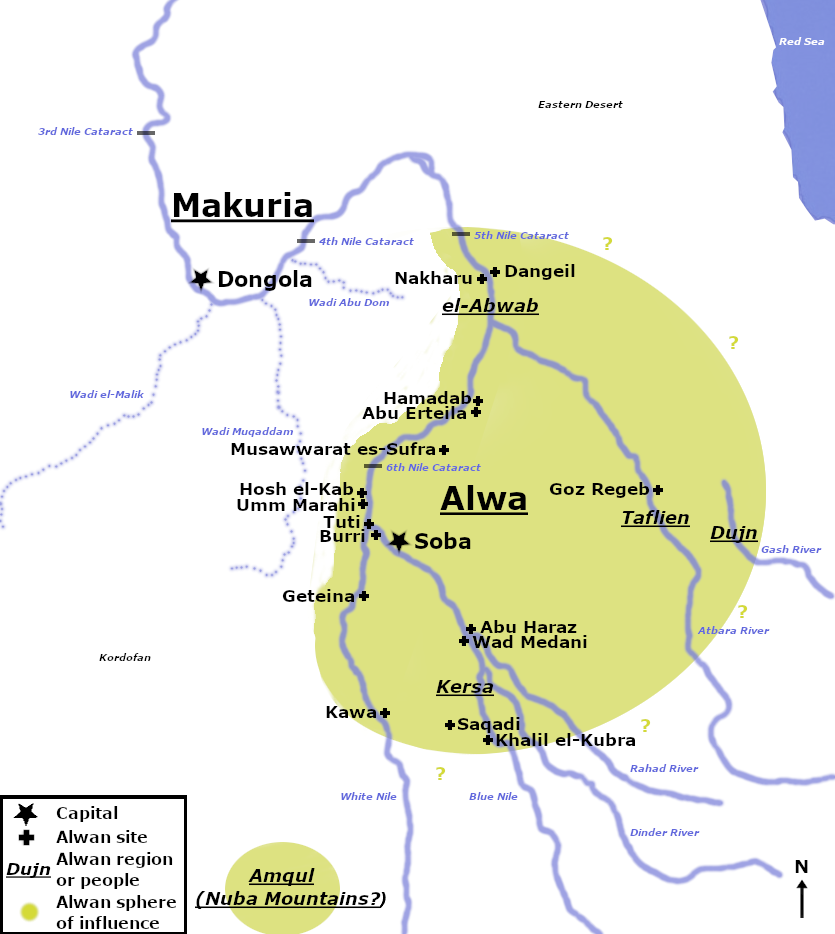
Approximate extension of Alodia based on accounts of Ibn Hawqal

The Dinka presence in Alodia suggests a significant historical connection in the region. Cultural practices, such as beer-drinking rituals during sowing and harvesting sorghum, reflect similarities to Nubian traditions noted by Ibn Selim el-Assouani, indicating a continuity of influence from Alodia. Historical accounts, including manuscripts from the 18th century, reference the Dinka's ancestral ties to Nubians, with early modern Sudanese manuscript writers noting that they are derived from the "Anag", a term used by Spaulding to describe Eastern Sudanic-speaking peoples who were a part of the kingdom of Alodia. Linguistic studies support the idea that the Dinka resided in the Gezira, which was under Alodia's influence before their migration southward, likely due to political upheaval and increased slavery following Alodia's decline in the 13th century. Shared Nilotic traditions, such as human sacrifice and ceremonial regicide, further indicate a cultural heritage influenced by Nubian practices. Additionally, 13th-century accounts by Ibn Sa'id al-Andalusi describe the Damadim, who were engaged in conflict with the Alodians, highlighting interactions between Nilotic groups and Nubian territories. Archaeological evidence, including the tradition of king-killing, links the Dinka to later groups who lived in Alodia's successor state, Fazughli, where the custom persisted into the 19th century.

The Damadim, a group of Africans mentioned by various medieval Arab writers during the 13th century, may have been ancestors of the Dinka and other Western Nilotic groups like the Luo peoples. They were reported to live southwest of Alodia, possibly in the Southern Gezira or around the Bahr al-Ghazal and Sobat regions of South Sudan. Stephanie Beswick suggests that the Dinka's ancestors could have been based along the White Nile in the Gezira plains. The Damadim were known for their raids and conquests, notably their sacking of the Christian Kingdom of Alodia's capital, Soba, around 1220 A.D. During this period, they were referred to as the "Tatars of the Sudan" due to their simultaneous raids with the Mongol invasions of Persia. Archaeological evidence from Soba indicates significant destruction, including the looting of burial sites and the destruction of two major churches, possibly tied to the Damadim conquest. Despite the limited sources, the Damadim's movements and activities provide a potential link to the later (western) Nilotic migrations into South Sudan that would occur post-1000 A.D. and are linked with the introduction of humped cattle.

Dinka men with spears, necklaces and bracelets

The Dinka migrations southward during the 15th to 18th centuries played a crucial role in shaping their territorial dominance in what is now South Sudan. Following the collapse of the Alodian Kingdom and the establishment of the Funj Sultanate in 1504 by Sultan Amara Dunqas, the Dinka, alongside other Nilotic groups like the Shilluk, moved further south, clashing with the Funj and other local populations. Oral traditions and archaeological evidence suggest that the Dinka displaced and absorbed various groups in their path, including the remnants of the Funj people, who were themselves possibly linked to the Nubian traditions of medieval Alodia. These conflicts between the Dinka and the Funj are well-documented in Dinka oral histories, with stories of fierce battles where the Dinka eventually forced the Funj northward, allowing them to establish their sultanate as Sennār, which the Dinka would also raid in the following centuries. Over time the Dinka and Funj developed more complex relations, with Dinka warriors serving as mercenaries in the Funj provinces, and Dinka merchants engaging in the regional slave trade. Despite these evolving relations, the Dinka continued to expand into western and southern territories, solidifying their presence and dominance in much of modern South Sudan.

== Recent history ==
The Dinka's religions, beliefs, and lifestyle have led to conflict with the Arab Islamic government in Khartoum. The Sudan People's Liberation Army, led by Dinka John Garang, took arms against the government in 1983. During the subsequent 21-year civil war, many thousands of Dinka, along with non-Dinka southerners, were massacred by government forces. Since the independence of South Sudan, the Dinka, led by Salva Kiir, engaged in a civil war with the Nuer and other groups, who accuse them of monopolising power.

=== Christianity ===
In 1983, due to Sudan's second civil war, many educated Dinka were forced to flee the cities to rural areas. Some were Christians who had been converted by the Church Missionary Society. Among them were ordained clergymen who began preaching in the villages. Songs and praise were used to teach the mostly illiterate Dinka about the faith. Most Dinka converted to Christianity and are learning to adapt traditional religious practices to Christian teachings. The conversion took place in rural villages and among Dinka refugees country. The Lost Boys of Sudan were converted in significant numbers in the refugee camps of Ethiopia.

=== 2010s massacres ===
Between 2013 and 2014, forces led by the breakaway Riek Machar faction deliberately killed an estimated 2,000 civilians from Hol, Nyarweng, Twic east and Bor and wounded several thousand more over two months. Much of their wealth was destroyed, which led to mass starvation deaths. It is estimated that 100,000 people left the area following the attack.
