= Khartoum International Community School =

Khartoum International Community School (KICS)

Location
- Khartoum; Sudan
- Coordinates: 15°32′1″N 32°35′8″E

Information
- Type: Private
- Established: 2004
- Chairman: Osama Daoud Abdellatif
- Principal: Peter Round
- Gender: Co-educational
- Website: www.kics.org

Khartoum International Community School (KICS) is a private English-medium international School, established by the DAL Group in 2004. Located on a purpose-built campus in the Hay El Raqi area, a Southern suburb of Khartoum, Sudan, KICS caters for students from age of 3 to 18 years.

KICS is an International Baccalaureate curriculum school. In addition to its academic programmes, KICS offers extra-curricular activities. School teams compete in a range of sports and represent the school at a variety of international tournaments.

KICS was accredited by the Council of International Schools in 2010 and is authorized to offer the IB Diploma and Primary Years programmes.

In the 2010/11 school year, KICS had 416 students. KICS then employed 124 staff with 59 faculty and 23 teaching assistants. It has been an IB World school since March 2007.

School Area

Size of school is about 24,000 f^2

== See also ==
- International School
- International Baccalaureate
- IGCSE
- CIS
- List of International Schools
