= Al-Aswani =

10th-century Egyptian diplomat

Abu Muhammad Abdallah ibn Ahmad ibn Salim (or ibn Sulaym) al-Aswani (Arabic: أبو محمد عبد الله ابن احمد ابن سليم الأسواني, romanized: ʿAbū Muḥammad Abd Allāh ibn Aḥmad ibn Salīm/Sulaym al-Aswānī) was a tenth-century Egyptian diplomat and Shia Muslim dāʿī (missionary) in the service of the Fatimids.

Following the Fatimid conquest of Egypt, he was dispatched to Nubia by the Fatimid governor, Jawhar al-Siqilli. The exact date and duration of his mission are unknown. He was likely sent during Jawhar's rule over Egypt (969–973) before the arrival of Caliph al-Mu'izz to the country in 973, but the work is dedicated to Caliph al-Aziz, who succeeded al-Mu'izz in 975. He left a written record of his mission, the Kitāb Akhbār al-Nūba waʾl-Muḳurra wa ʿAlwa waʾl-Buja waʾl-Nīl ("Book of Reports on Nubia, Makuria, Alodia, the Beja and the Nile"). This is the only surviving eyewitness description of medieval Nubia other than the very brief account in Ibn Ḥawqal.

Jawhar, who had led the Fatimid conquest of Egypt, was eager to establish peaceful relations with the Nubian kingdoms to his south, especially in view of the still shaky foundation of Fatimid rule in Egypt, threatened by revolts and by invasion by the Qarmatians of Bahrayn. The mission also intended to deliver a letter demanding the conversion of the Nubian kings to Islam; while Heinz Halm considers this request a mere symbolic gesture, Jawhar may have been under the impression that the Nubians, who had previously resisted Islamization, might be persuaded to convert to Isma'ilism, the Islamic doctrine espoused by the Fatimids. Jawhar chose as his ambassador Abdallah ibn Ahmad ibn Salim (or Sulaym) from Aswan (the nisbah al-Aswani means "of Aswan") presumably because Aswan lay on Egypt's frontier with Nubia, and so Abdallah could be presumed to have some familiarity with the country. The origin and prior biography of al-Aswani are otherwise entirely unknown.

Al-Aswani travelled through much of Lower Nubia with a large retinue. He celebrated Eid al-Adha with some sixty fellow Muslims. He stayed several months in Dongola, the capital of Makuria. There he persuaded King George II to resume payment of the baqt, an annual tribute the Nubians had rendered to the Muslim rulers of Egypt since the seventh century. He failed, however, to persuade the king to convert to Islam, although he did engage in a debate at court. He also visited the southern kingdom of Alodia and describes its capital, Soba, in the Kitāb Akhbār al-Nūba. He does not appear to have visited the country of the Beja, however, and his descriptions of it are secondhand. Al-Aswani gives a description of the White Nile and Blue Nile and their confluence at Khartoum, remarking on the fact that the waters of the two did not immediately dissolve into one another; al-Aswani thus became the first Egyptian traveller to witness the confluence of the Nile's two major tributaries since the Roman emperor Nero (r. 50–66) sent two centurions on a similar mission.

The record of al-Aswani's voyage survives only as excerpts in al-Maqrizi (d. 1442) and al-Manufi (d. 1527). According to Halm, the fact that al-Maqrizi, writing in the 15th century, had to refer to al-Aswani's work shows that no such similar journeys were undertaken from Egypt in the meantime. The excerpts of al-Maqrizi are quoted and abridged in Ibn Iyas (d. 1522/4). The original complete work is lost. Historian Yūsuf Faḍl Ḥasan opines that the Kitāb seems to have once circulated relatively widely, since it can be detected as a source in several works, such as that of Abu al-Makarim. Conversely, Halm considers that al-Aswani's work was not cited by earlier authors, indicating that it was never publicly circulated, instead being kept in the palace archives in Cairo for the first centuries of its existence. The Kitāb is still one of the most important sources on medieval Nubia. He describes the geography, history and contemporary political situation of the bilād al-Sūdān. He describes a quite centralized and prosperous Makurian state. Unlike many other Arab writers, he seems favourably disposed to the Christian kingdoms.

== Sources ==
- Adams, William Y. (1991). "Ibn Salim al-Aswani". In Aziz Suryal Atiya (ed.). Coptic Encyclopedia. Vol. 4. Macmillan. pp. 1271a–1272a.
- Faḍl Ḥasan, Yūsuf (1971). "Ibn Sulaym al-Aswānī". In Lewis, B.; Ménage, V. L.; Pellat, Ch. & Schacht, J. (eds.). The Encyclopaedia of Islam, Second Edition. Volume III: H–Iram. Leiden: E. J. Brill. p. 949. OCLC 495469525.
- Halm, Heinz (2003). Die Kalifen von Kairo: Die Fatimiden in Ägypten, 973–1074 [The Caliphs of Cairo: The Fatimids in Egypt, 973–1074] (in German). Munich: C. H. Beck. ISBN 3-406-48654-1.
- Kheir, El-Hag H. M. (1989). "A Contribution to a Textual Problem: Ibn Sulaym al-Aswāni's Kitāb Akhbār al-Nūba wa-l-Maqurra wa-l-Beja wa-l-Nīl". Arabica. 36 (1): 36–80. doi:10.1163/157005889X00223.
