= DAL Group =

Sudanese commercial conglomerate (e. 1951)

- Formerly: Sudanese Tractor Company (SUTRAC)
- Type: Privately held company
- Founded: 1951 (as Sawyer & Colley); 1966 (as SUTRAC); 1980s (as DAL Group)
- Headquarters: Khartoum, Sudan
- Key people: Osama Daoud Abdellatif (CEO, Founder)
- Number of employees: 8200+ (2020)
- Divisions: DAL Agriculture; DAL Property Development; DAL Food; DAL Motors
- Website: dalgroup.com

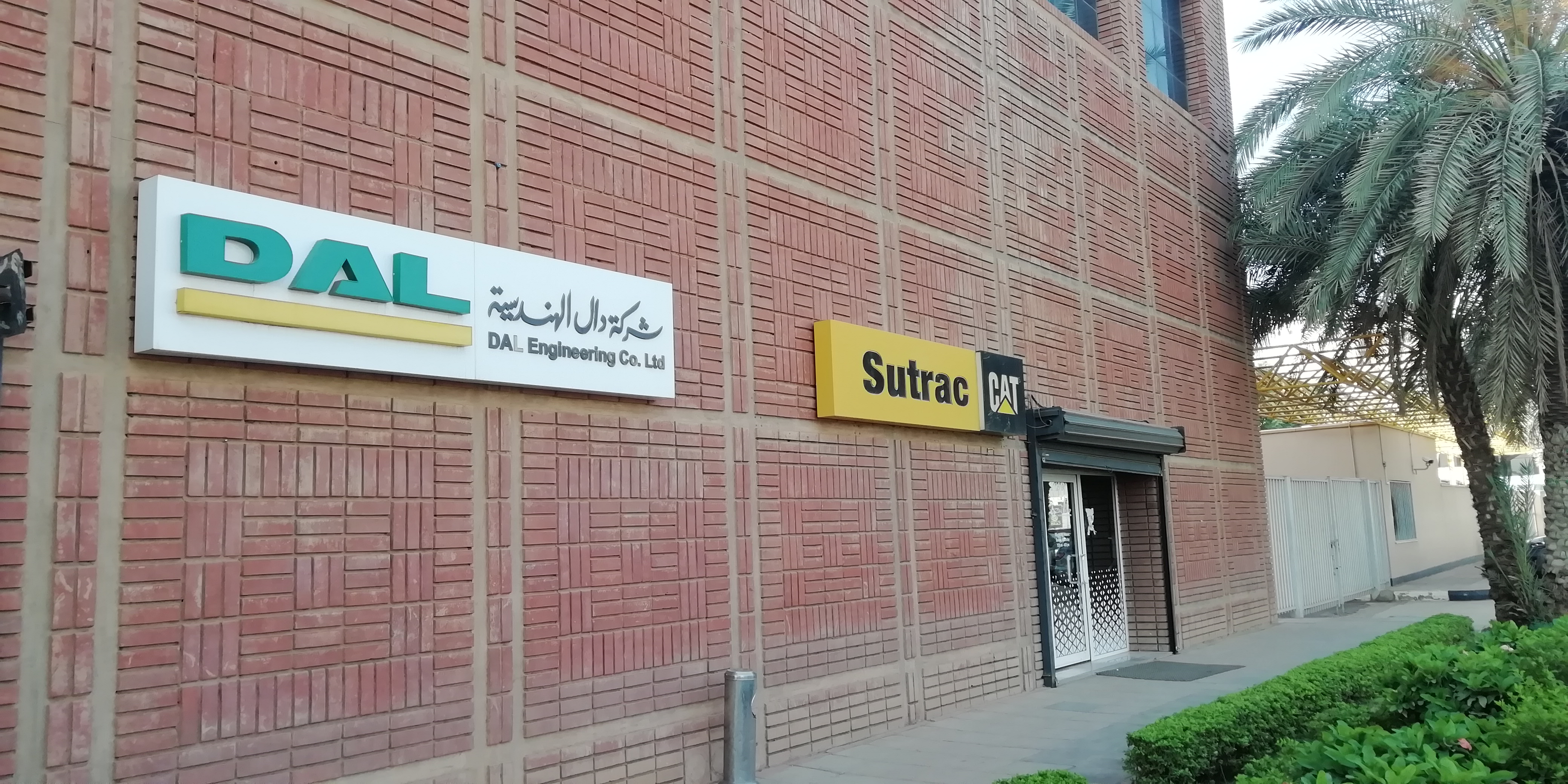
DAL Engineering and SUTRAC building in Khartoum

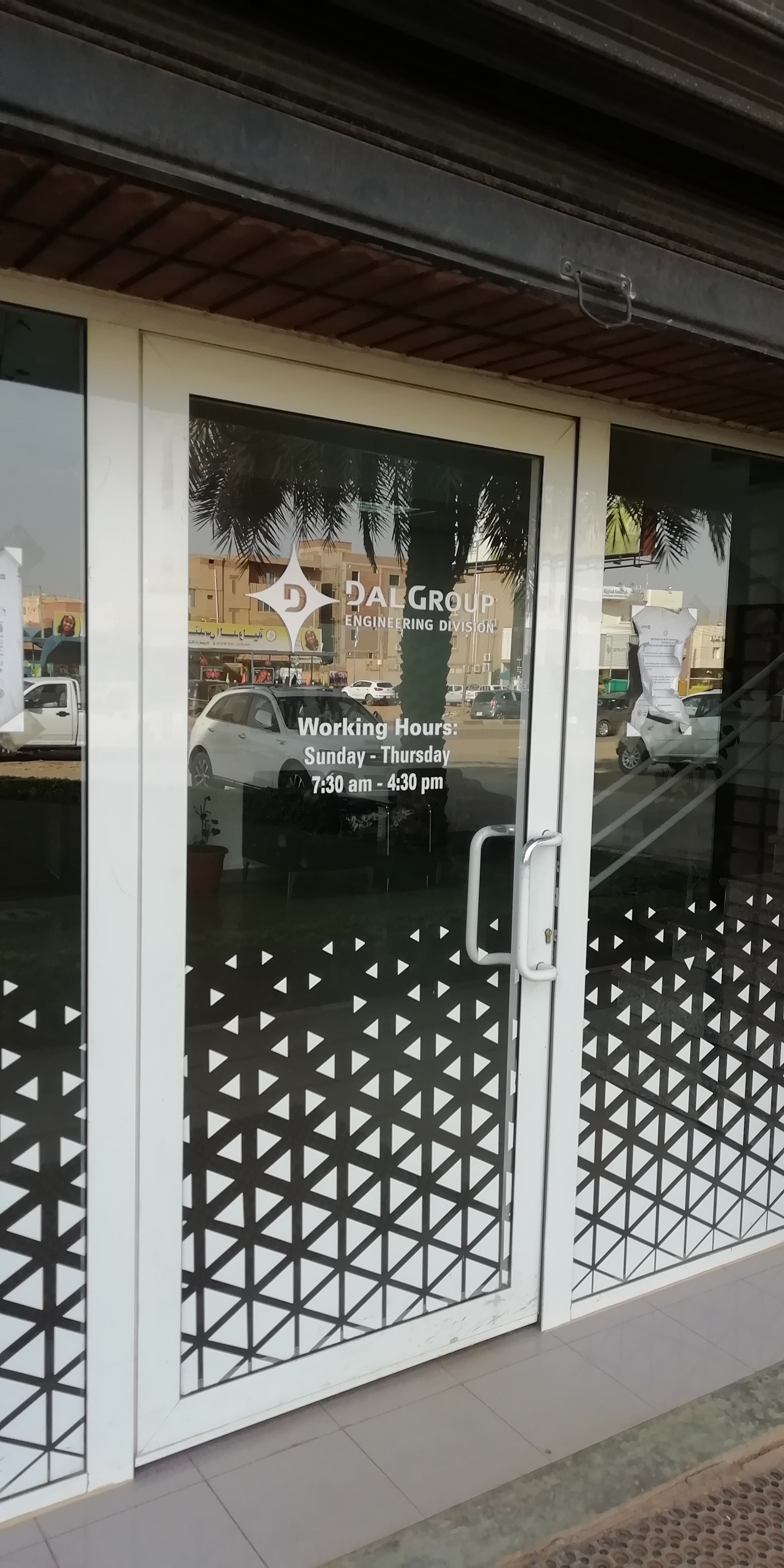
Entrance to DAL Group

DAL Group is a private Sudanese conglomerate, the largest private company in the country. It operates across several business sectors including food, engineering and agriculture.

== History ==
The DAL Group originated from the engineering company Sayer & Colley, founded in 1951 by two British partners when Sudan was under Anglo-Egyptian rule. Sayer & Colley later received Caterpillar's franchise for the country. In 1966, ten years after Sudan's independence, Caterpillar transferred the franchise to the Sudanese Tractor Company (SUTRAC) owned by Daoud Abdellatif, with Sayer & Colley retaining a minority share. Both companies were nationalized in 1970 then de-nationalized in 1971, although the government kept a minority share in both.

Osama Daoud Abdellatif, Daoud Abdellatif's eldest son, joined SUTRAC in 1975 and became sales manager in 1978. After the government's share was bought out, he convinced his father to buy Sayer & Colley's share in 1979 and became CEO of SUTRAC the same year when Abdellatif became sick. Osama renamed the company DAL Engineering (his father's initials). DAL Agriculture was created soon after, leading to the creation of the DAL Group. Several additional companies under the DAL name have been created since.

In response to the COVID-19 pandemic, DAL provided sanitization booths to the Ministry of Health in Khartoum.

== Business sectors ==
=== Agriculture ===
DAL Agriculture, founded in 1984, provides machinery and engineering services to Sudan's farmers. DAL Dairy Factory operates a dairy farm and co-operates with USAID to provide impoverished school children in the Red Sea state with milk.

The DAL Group signed an agreement with the African Development Bank in March 2020, which provides a loan of up to $75 million to improve Sudan's food security and create more agricultural jobs. In October 2020, DAL and United Arab Emirates-based IHC Food Holding agreed to invest $225 million over five years to develop 100,000 acres of farmland in Abu Hamad.

=== Automotive ===
DAL Motors operates several franchises in Sudan, including Mitsubishi since 1994, Mercedes-Benz since 2006, and Kia. The company signed up to the United Nations Global Compact, but was delisted in April 2019 for failing to provide an annual report.

=== Development ===
DAL Group partnered with the National Social Insurance Fund and Khartoum State on the Al Mogran Development, a $4.5 billion construction project in Central Khartoum, next to the confluence of the Blue and White Nile. The project consisted of two phases with the first phase being the creation of a Central Business District, and second phase consisting of 1500 acres of residential space. In light of the ongoing war in Darfur, the project came to a halt in 2007 after the United States included the project management company, Al Sunut Development to the OFAC Sudan sanctions list, due to its connection to the Sudanese government. In 2021, the Emirates Stallions Group announced a hospitality project within the Al Morgan Development in partnership with DAL Group worth $65.3 million. The project will consist of a 16-floor hotel and residences.

=== Food ===
DAL Food is the largest company within the group by business volume and operates flour mills under its Sayga brand. It has also produced and distributed Coca-Cola for the Sudanese market since 2002 and has a factory for processing gum arabic for export.

=== Others ===
DAL is involved in the education sector, having founded the Khartoum International Community School (KICS) in 2004. It also has a foothold in the mining, healthcare distribution and industrial gas industries.

== Controversies ==
There is criticism within Sudan about subsidies given to companies involved in flour production and import, although the subsidies are intended to keep prices down for consumers and manufacturers.

== See also ==
- Economy of Sudan
- List of companies based in Sudan
