= New Khartoum International Airport =

New Khartoum International Airport مطار الخرطوم الدولي الجديد
- IATA: KRT (Once opened); ICAO: HSSN

Summary
- Airport type: Public
- Hub for: Sudan Airways
- Built: Under construction since 2006; 20 years ago
- Coordinates: 15°15′56″N 032°21′35″E
- Interactive map of New Khartoum International Airport

Runways
Direction	Length		Surface
Direction	m	ft	Surface
	4,000	13,123
	4,000	13,123

New Khartoum International Airport (Arabic:مطار الخرطوم الدولي الجديد) is an international airport under construction since 2006 in Omdourman, Sudan, 40 km (25 mi) south of Khartoum's city centre. It completed its first milestone (an annual capacity of 6 million) in 31 December 2025.

== History ==
Completion was scheduled for 2010 which was moved to 2022. This was planned to have two 4,000 metres (13,000 ft) runways, a passenger terminal of 86,000 square metres (930,000 sq ft) and a 300-room international hotel. Construction was to be carried out by China Harbour Engineering Co. (CHEC), but the Turkey-based construction firm Summa was later selected for construction of New Khartoum Airport in 2018, but construction has been suspended as of 2021.

== Bibliography ==
- Official website
