= Al-Mogran Development Project =

Coordinates: 15°36′23″N 32°29′56″E

The Al-Mogran Development Project is an over $4 billion development project undertaken by the Alsunut Development Company that seeks to develop several thousand acres in downtown Khartoum along the spot where the White Nile and Blue Nile merge to form the Nile. The discovery of oil in Sudan has provided the Sudanese government with a billion dollar surplus that allows the funding of this project.

Starting in 2004, the project has two main phases:

- Phase I: The Central Business District development
- Phase II: The residential estate portion

The Al-Mogran project, when completed, would have produce 11,000,000 square feet (1,000,000 m^{2}) of office space, 1,100 villas, housing for 45,000 residents and visitors, and jobs for 60,000 Sudanese. The project, however, has received criticism in light of the continuing Darfur Conflict. Completion was expected by 2014.

== Disruption ==
With the Sudanese government facing increased pressure to halt the conflict in Darfur, the Al-Mogran project came to a halt in 2007 after the United States included the project management company, Al Sunut Development to the OFAC Sudan sanctions list, due to its connection to the Sudanese government.

== Recent ==
In 2021, the Emirates Stallions Group announced a hospitality project within the Al Mogran Development in partnership with DAL Group worth $65.3 million. The project will consist of a 16-floor hotel and residences.
