= Abd al-Salam al-Manufi =

Egyptian historian (1442–1527)

Abuʾl-ʿAbbās Aḥmad ibn Muḥammad ibn Muḥammad ibn ʿAbd al-Salām Shihāb al-Dīn al-Manūfī al-Shāfiʿī (1443–1527) was an Egyptian writer active in Mamluk Egypt and later in the Ottoman period.

He was born in Manūf on 11 June 1443 (14 Rabīʿi 847 in the Islamic calendar). He studied at Cairo before returning to Manūf to serve as a ḳāḍī (judge). He died in 1527 (931).

Al-Manūfī was primarily a writer of local and regional history. Among his works are Kitāb al-Fayḍ al-madīd fī akhbār al-Nīl al-sadīd, a tract on the Nile and its source; Kitāb al-Badr al-ṭāliʿ min al-Ḍawʾ al-lāmiʿ, an abridged version of Shams al-Dīn al-Sakhāwī's treatise The Light that Shines on the People of the Ninth Century; and Kitāb al-Naṣīḥa bi-mā abdathu ʾl-qarīḥa. He had access to the now lost work of the 10th-century writer Ibn Sulaym al-Aswānī on Nubia.
