= Sara Berkai =

British-Eritrean social entrepreneur

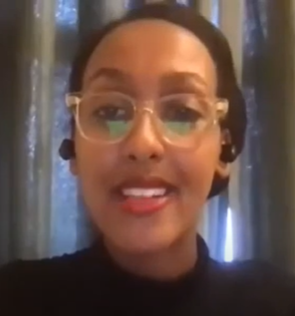
- Born: Khartoum, Sudan
- Education: University College London; University of Oxford
- Occupations: social enterprise founder and STEM educator

Sara Berkai is an Eritrean and British social enterprise founder and STEM educator. She founded the company Ambessa Play. In 2024, she was named to the BBC's list of 100 Women.

== Biography ==
Berkai was born in Khartoum, Sudan, to Eritrean parents. When she was a young child, her family fled from conflict in Eritrea and moved to London in the UK.

During her A levels, Berkai attended the University College London (UCL) Widening Participation scheme's "Computer Science Summer School" and learned the Java programming language. Berkai was the first member of her family to attend university. She studied Information Management for Business at UCL then MSc Child Development at the University of Oxford.

After graduating, Berkai voluntarily taught Science, Technology, Engineering and Maths (STEM) subjects to displaced children in Ethiopia and Eritrea. She also worked for Amazon and Cisco.

In 2020, Berkai founded Ambessa Play, a social enterprise that co-designs DIY educational kits for children which support them to learn about STEM through play. For each DIY kit which is purchased, Ambessa Play donate a kit to an out-of-school refugee for free. By 2023, Ambessa Play had sold over 5,000 kits.

== Awards ==
- Pass It On Award (2020)
- Young ICT Leader Award from the United Nations International Telecommunications Union (2019)
- Women in Innovation Award from Innovate UK (2023). During British Science Week, Berkai and other Innovators met with the UK Science Minister George Freeman for a roundtable discussion about STEM businesses.
- BBC 100 Woman (2024)

In 2024, Berkai was honoured with a purple commemorative plaque at her alma mater, the University of Oxford.
