= Khartoum American School =

Location
- Khartoum; Sudan
- Coordinates: 15.5556°N 32.5468°E

Information
- Type: Private
- Established: 1957; 69 years ago
- Superintendent: Ms. Bridget Davies
- Grades: PreSchool-12
- Gender: Mixed
- Website: www.krtams.org

Khartoum American School, founded in 1957, is an international school in Khartoum, Sudan that teaches an American/International curriculum. The school is a full member of the Council of International Schools (CIS) and is accredited jointly through CIS and the Middle States Association of Schools and Colleges (MSA).

While founded to offer education to the children of US diplomats in Khartoum, KAS later admitted students from the international community in Khartoum. As of 2016, 253 students from 44 countries were enrolled. The Early Childhood Center offers schooling to children from 3 years to 4 years of age (at the start of the school year) in preschool, and pre-kindergarten. The Elementary School encompasses kindergarten through grade 5. Middle School (grades 6–8) serves young adolescents and the High School division offers a college-preparatory education to students in grades 9–12.

Class size ranges from 3 to 23 students, with a couple of classes temporarily (2016) surpassing the 23 student limit.

== History and Location ==
Khartoum American School was founded in 1957 with a mission to educate children of U.S. diplomats and other foreign nationals residing in Khartoum.

KAS began with a student population of 11 children who received instruction on the veranda of a private home. Within a short time, KAS rented its own quarters and in 1966, when enrollment had grown to 77 pupils, the school moved to a new site on Street No. 29 in the New Extension area of Khartoum. During that year, the school welcomed 96 students of 21 different nationalities. The school continued on Street No. 29 for 18 years.

A larger school was then needed and Chevron Oil Company provided a generous grant to help with the construction of the new school, built to U.S. standards. A Danish architect was hired to design and oversee the construction of the new facility, which began in 1982 and was completed in 1984. Since then, the school has continued uninterrupted on its current campus, with the exception of a temporary suspension in 1991 during the Gulf War crisis, a 2-day closure following the events of September 11, and a 5-day closure during civil unrest in the autumn of 2013.

KAS is located approximately three miles south of downtown Khartoum, and is housed on its 10-acre campus in 21 buildings, which include 26 classrooms, a science laboratory, a library, two computer labs, art and music rooms, dedicated ESL facilities, a learning center, nurse's office, a covered quad used for plays and ceremonies, food kiosk, two large playing fields, a covered basketball court and grass volleyball fields, and an aquatic complex that includes a 25-meter swimming pool.

The KAS High School encompasses grades 9–12.

== Governance ==
The school is governed by a 9-member board, 8 of whom are elected for 2 year terms by the Khartoum American School Parents' Association, and 1 who is appointed by the U.S. embassy. Membership in the Association is automatically conferred on the parents or guardians of children enrolled in the school.

== Curriculum ==
The curriculum is inquiry-based and international in scope with outdated education. The language of instruction is English and its core programs (Creative Curriculum, Eureka Math, etc.) are from the U.S. The School's core curriculum includes language arts (English), math with teachers, science, social studies, foreign language (French or Arabic). The core curriculum is supplemented by classes in music, art and physical education. The school offers the following Advanced Placement (AP) courses: calculus, statistics, physics, chemistry, English literature, studio art, world history, economics, and psychology. The High School curriculum also includes several electives. The school's testing program utilizes standardized assessments that include the Measures of Academic Progress (MAP) administered twice a year to all students in grades 2–11, and the PSAT, SAT and TOEFL which are administered for college and university admission when appropriate. There is an active after-school sports program at the secondary level (basketball, soccer, swimming, and volleyball), and an active after-school activities program for Elementary School children. Student Support staff are available at KAS to assist students who have any learning challenges. The School is fully accredited by the Middle States Association of Colleges and Schools (USA) and the Council of International Schools (UK).

== Facilities and Technology ==
Over the past several years the School has made extensive efforts in greening the campus, resulting in spacious lawns for students and families to enjoy. In 2012 KAS opened its Aquatic Complex with a half-Olympic-size swimming pool and a small splash pool for infants. It was used by Olympic athletes training for the London 2012 Olympics.

It has two computer labs with 41 Mac computers. Wireless internet connections are available throughout the campus. KAS has a 1-to-1 MacBook Pro laptop, program for all students from grades 3–12. iPads are used in grades K-2.

== Accreditation ==
KAS has been accredited through the Middle States Association of Schools and Colleges (MSA) and the Council of International Schools (CIS). In 2018, KAS had its accreditation renewed by CIS/MSA.

Additionally, KAS is a full member of the Africa International School Association (AISA).

KAS is also an active member of the Association for Supervision and Curriculum Development (ASCD).
