= Squatting in Sudan =

Occupation of unused land or buildings without the permission of the owner

Sudan on the globe

Squatting in Sudan is defined as the "acquisition and construction of land, within the city boundaries for the purpose of housing in contradiction to Urban Planning and Land laws and building regulations." These informal settlements arose in Khartoum from the 1920s onwards, swelling in the 1960s. By the 1980s, the government was clearing settlements in Khartoum and regularizing them elsewhere. It was estimated that in 2015 that were 200,000 squatters in Khartoum, 180,000 in Nyala, 60,000 in Kassala, 70,000 in Port Sudan and 170,000 in Wad Madani.

== History ==
The first squatted informal settlements arose in Khartoum when migrants from rural areas arrived in the 1920s. In the early 1960s, migration was increasing and there were around 50,000 squatters.

In the late 1980s, the government of Sadiq al-Mahdi began to demolish squatter settlements in Khartoum. Displaced people and squatters were viewed with suspicion by the authorities following a failed insurrection led by Nuba peoples and other South Sudanese people in 1985. After the 1989 Sudanese coup d'état, the Revolutionary Command Council for National Salvation (a military government led by Omar al-Bashir) targeted squatters. Evictions were mandated in 1990 by Decree 941 (Approval of Some Procedures to Contain Squatter Settlement) and an amendment to the Civil Transactions Act. The evictions sometimes resulted in violent episodes, such as in October 1994, when at least eleven people were killed in protests at Khoder in Omdurman. In that case, there was no judicial order and no notice had been given. Minister of Engineering Affairs Doctor Bannaga commented "We do not specify the date because if we do [...] They'll be organized and make an organized opposition". The forcible resettlement plans were condemned by the United States and other international donors. At Kosti around 72,000 squatters were evicted and at Ad-Damazin 23,000. In 1992, the United States Agency for International Development and the United Nations Children's Fund estimated 400,000 people had been evicted and moved into camps lacking sanitation and markets. In the newly created Al Salaam camp there were over 80,000 people. The Angola informal settlement was demolished but many of its 50,000 inhabitants simply returned and rebuilt their shacks.

Elsewhere in the country in cities such as Nyala and Port Sudan, squatter settlements have been regularized, a process which can take years. In 1995, it was estimated that squatters formed 40 per cent of the population of Greater Khartoum, which is composed of Khartoum, North Khartoum and Omdurman. This total of 1.9 million people included 800,000 displaced by war in the south of the country and 350,000 displaced by drought in the western region. In the same year, the government announced it had demolished 90 per cent of the informal settlements and forcibly resettled people into camps. Six squatters were hanged in 2010 as punishment for their part in the deaths of thirteen police officers during an eviction five years before in Soba Aradi, Khartoum.

Government analysis suggested in 2015 that there were 200,000 squatters in Khartoum, 180,000 in Nyala, 60,000 in Kassala, 70,000 in Port Sudan and 170,000 in Wad Madani. Squatter settlements were defined as the "acquisition and construction of land, within the city boundaries for the purpose of housing in contradiction to Urban Planning and Land laws and building regulations."
