= Osama Daoud Abdellatif =

Sudanese businessman

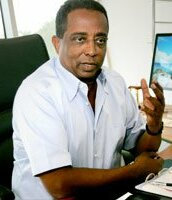
- Occupation: Businessman
- Known for: Chairman of DAL Group

Osama Daoud Abdellatif is a tycoon Sudanese businessman and the chairman of DAL Group, a large number of companies based in Khartoum, Sudan.

== Business ==
=== DAL Group ===
Osama Daoud is the chairman and founder of DAL Group, a large number of companies based in Khartoum, Sudan. DAL Group is present in diverse economic sectors, such as food production, engineering, or retail, through companies such as DAL Motors, DAL Engineering, DAL Food (which includes Sayga flour, the Blue Nile Dairy, Nobo Pasta, ), Sutrac and Sudanese Liquid Air, as well as many other companies.

DAL Group also founded the Khartoum International Community School (KICS) and, as part of their commitment to corporate social responsibility, is active in a number of cultural activities, such as the Sudan Traditional Food Festival or festivals celebrating Sudanese musical traditions.

After inheriting an engineering and tractor company from his father in the 1960s, Daoud rapidly expanded it to its present-day size as Sudan's largest conglomerate. Despite US-imposed sanctions on trade with Sudan, DAL Food Industries has been official bottler and retailer of the Coca-Cola Company in Sudan.
