= El Mek Nimr Bridge =

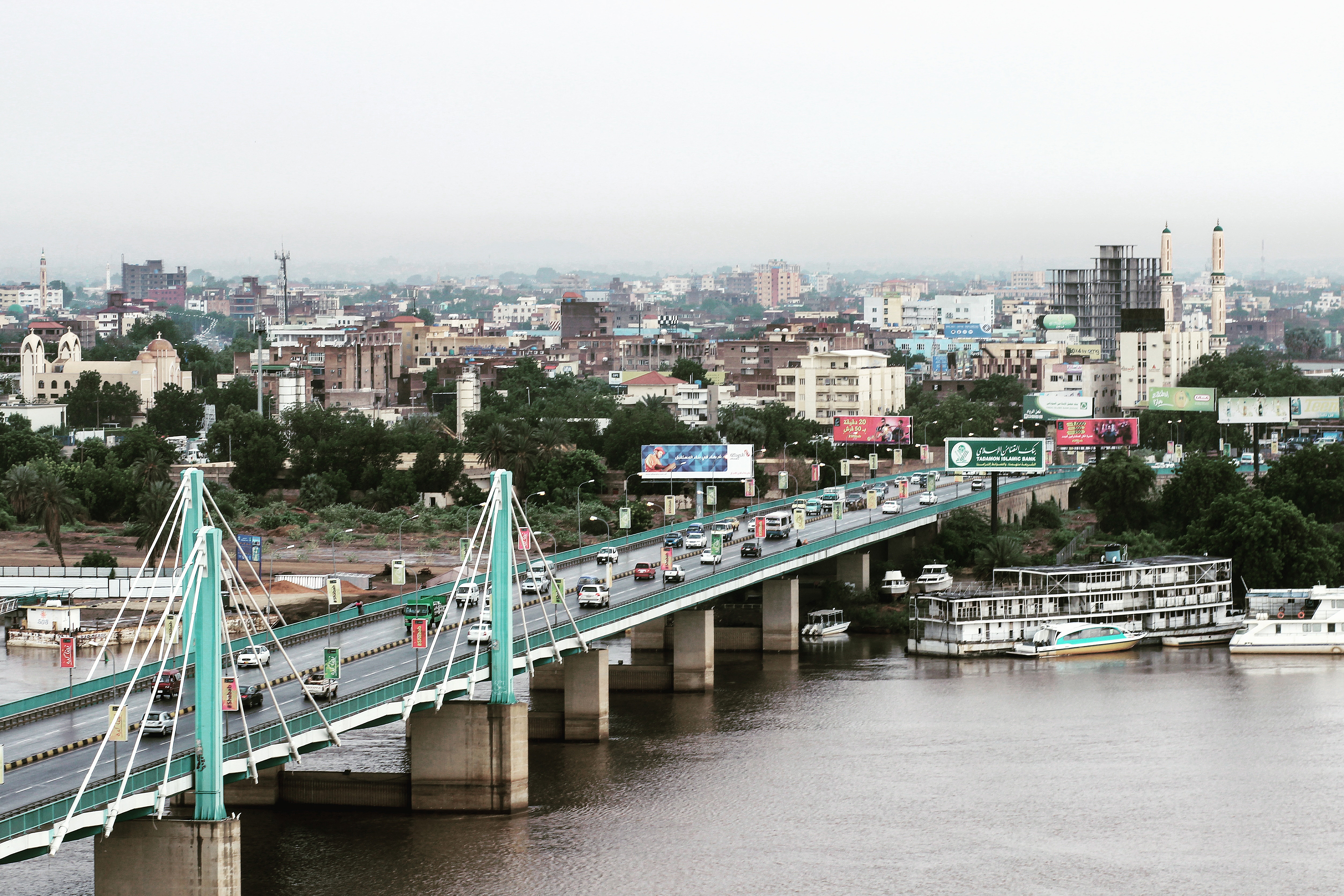
- El Mek Nimr Bridge in Khartoum
- Coordinates: 15°36′50″N 32°31′51″E
- Crosses: Blue Nile
- Locale: Khartoum

Characteristics
- Total length: 642.5 m

History
- Construction start: 2005
- Construction end: 2007

The El Mek Nimr Bridge is a bridge that links the downtown area of Khartoum, Sudan, with the adjacent city of Khartoum North across the Blue Nile river. It opened in 2007, and was named after Mek Nimr, a leader of the Ja'alin tribe in northern Sudan, who infamously killed the son of Muhammad Ali Pasha, Ismail, and his cortege when they invaded Sudan from Egypt in 1822.
