= Al Mansheiya Bridge =

Bridge in Khartoum, Sudan

Coordinates: 15.5990°N 32.5897°E

Al Mansheiya Bridge is a bridge that links the capital Khartoum and the industrial city Khartoum North across the Blue Nile in central Sudan. It is 350 meters long and 8.25 meters wide. The bridge opened in 2006.
