= Soba (city) =

Archaeological site and former town in central Sudan

Coordinates: 15°31′26″N 32°40′51″E

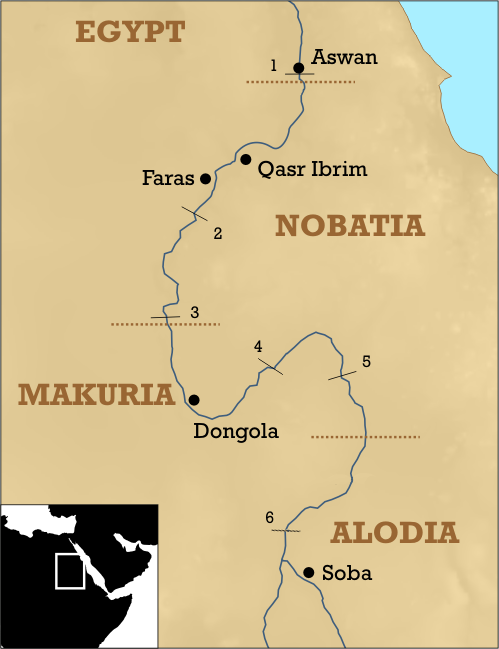
Location of Soba in medieval times (below on the right)

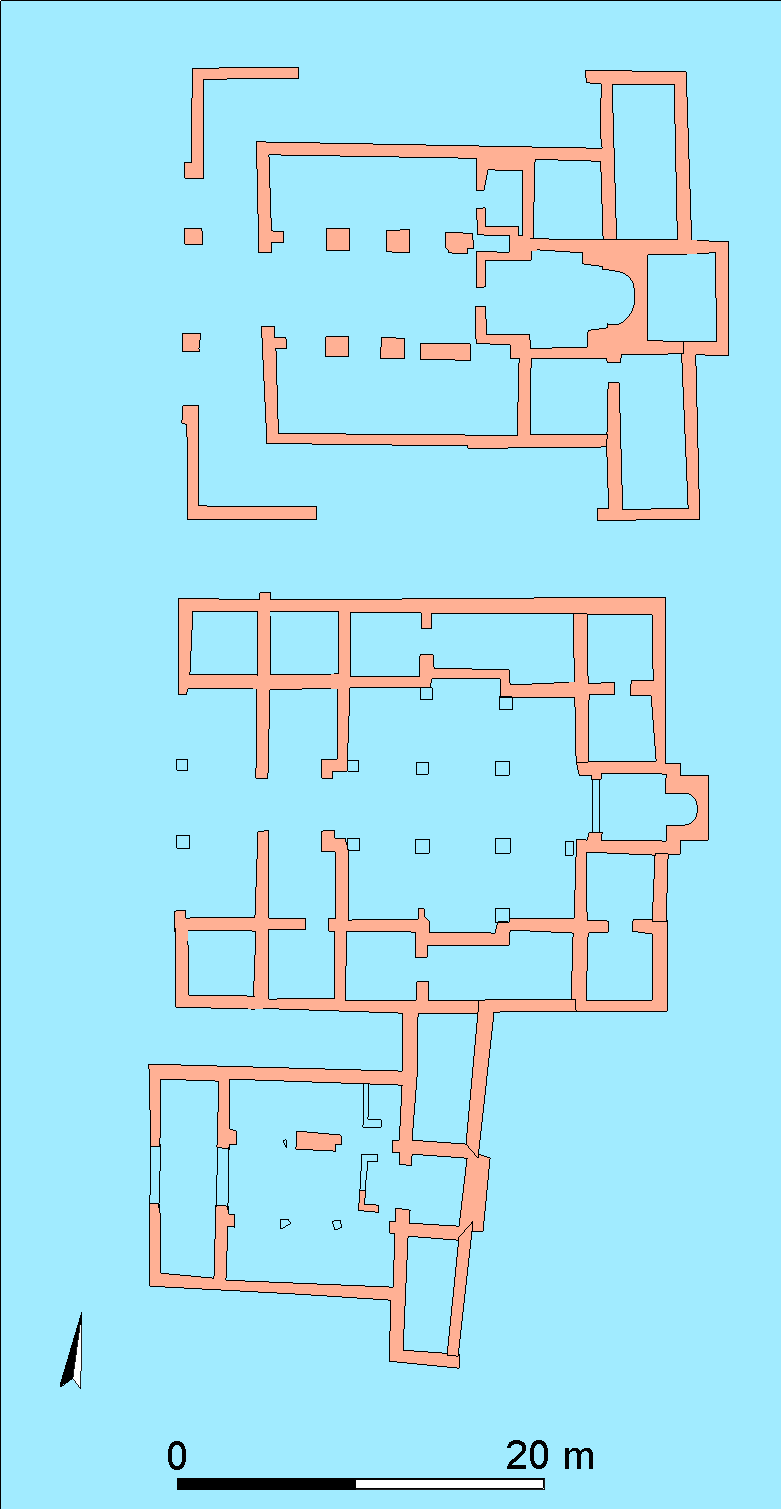
Church complex in Soba: All three churches were basilicas with a narthex in the West and an apse in the East

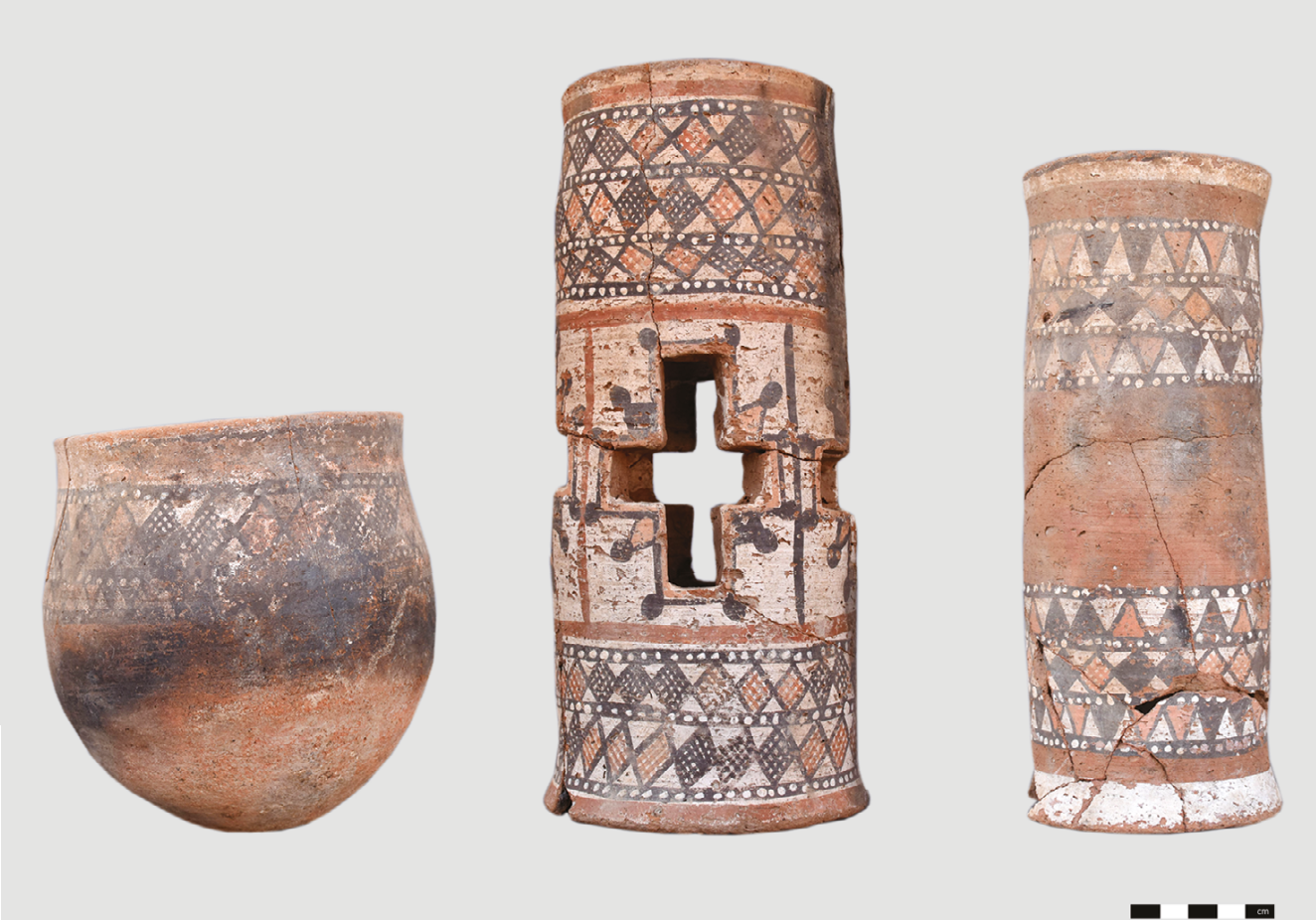
Pottery found in 2021–2022

Soba is an archaeological site and former town in what is now central Sudan. It was the capital of the medieval Nubian kingdom of Alodia from the sixth century until around 1500. E. A. Wallis Budge identified it with a group of ruins on the Blue Nile 19 kilometres (12 mi) from Khartoum, where there are remains of a Meroitic temple that had been converted into a Christian church.

In the 10th century Ibn Selim el-Aswani described the city as large and wealthy, with "fine buildings and extensive feelings". Built mainly of red brick, the abandoned city was plundered for building material when Khartoum was founded in 1821. Since the 1990s, development from the growth of suburbs in Greater Khartoum has continued to pose a threat to the ruins.

== Archaeological research ==
In its heyday, the city covered approximately 275 hectares, but the excavations carried out prior to 2019 only encompassed about 1% of this area. The research was conducted by, among others, expeditions from the Sudanese National Corporation for Antiquities and Museums (NCAM) and the British Institute in Eastern Africa, mostly as part of salvage excavations resulting from the construction of a tarmac road and the building activity along it. Since the 1900s, modern buildings started to cover the remains, resulting in modern development covering about half of the site.

In 2019, the interdisciplinary project "Soba – the heart of Alwa" was commenced. It is carried out by the Polish Centre of Mediterranean Archaeology University of Warsaw and the Institute of Archaeology and Ethnology of the Polish Academy of Sciences and is directed by Mariusz Drzewiecki (PCMA UW). It aims to study the topography of Soba and determine the extent, spatial structure, and character of each city quarter. A magnetic geophysical prospection revealed unknown parts of medieval Soba. In one of the quarters, large architectural complexes stood at a distance from each other; in another, a clear street grid is visible. Test trenches were also excavated in strategic spots in the city or in places where the results of the geophysical research are not unequivocal. The residence of the kingdom of Alwa's rulers has not yet been identified.
