= Khartoum =

Capital of Sudan

Khartoum الخرطوم
- Capital city
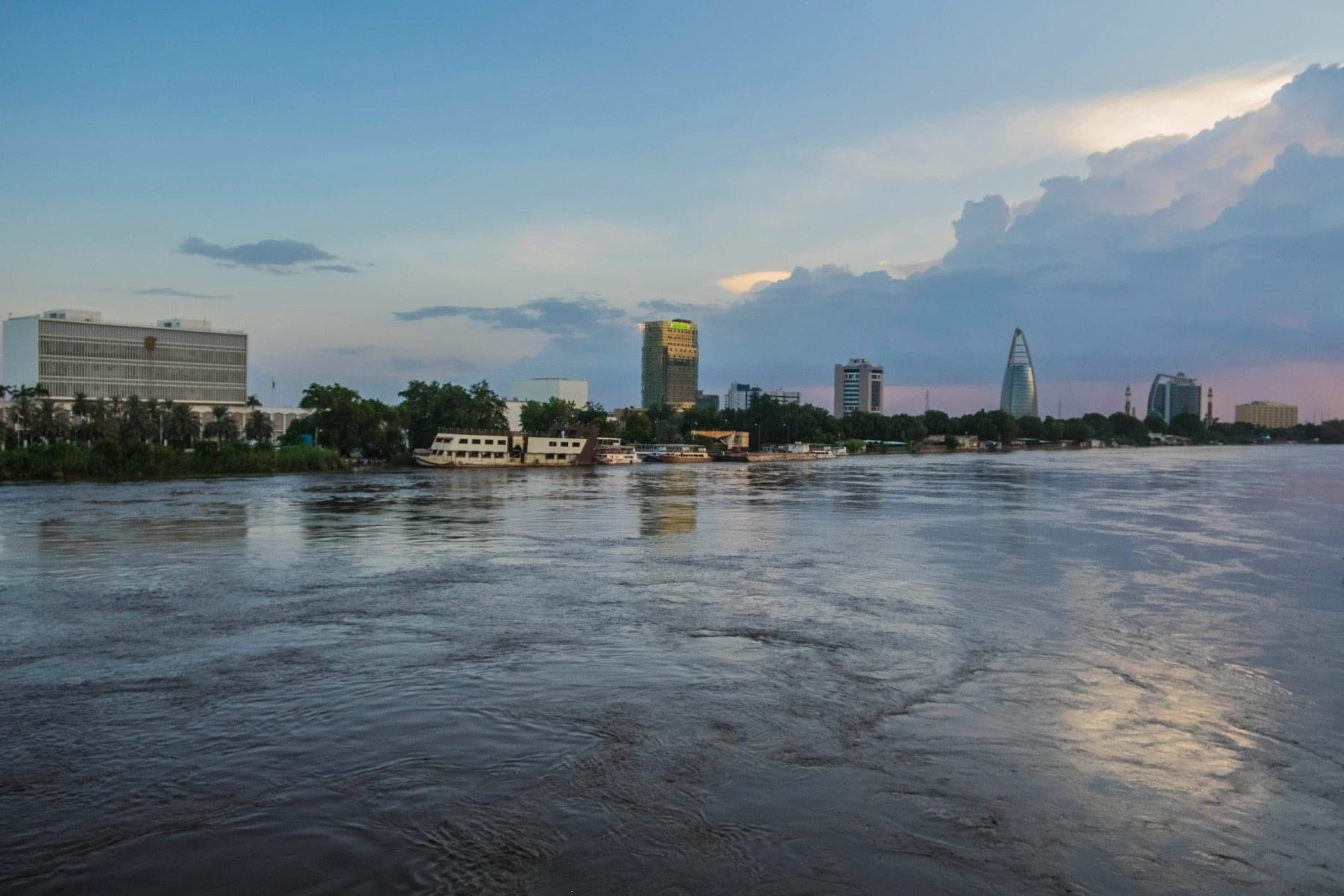
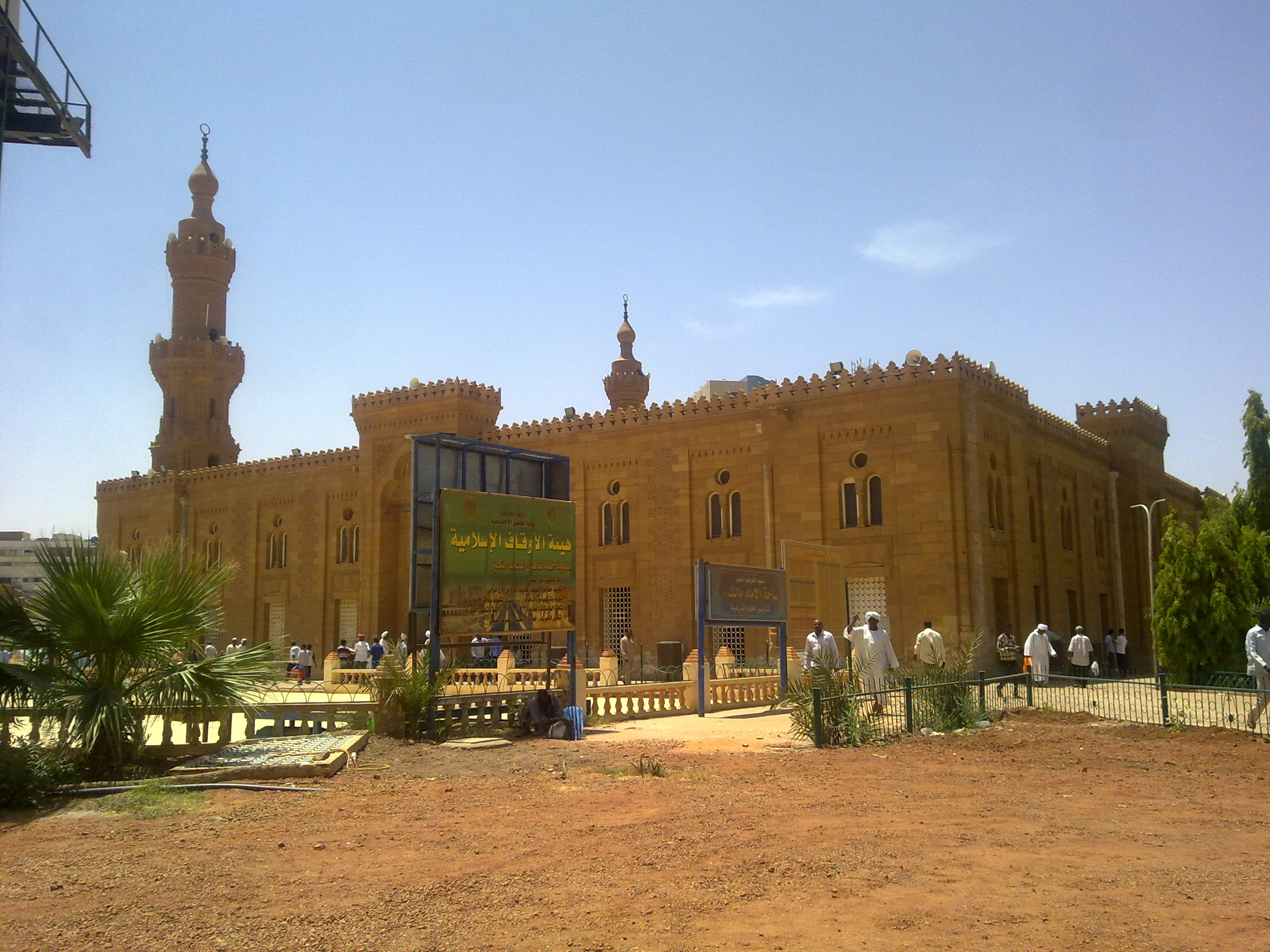
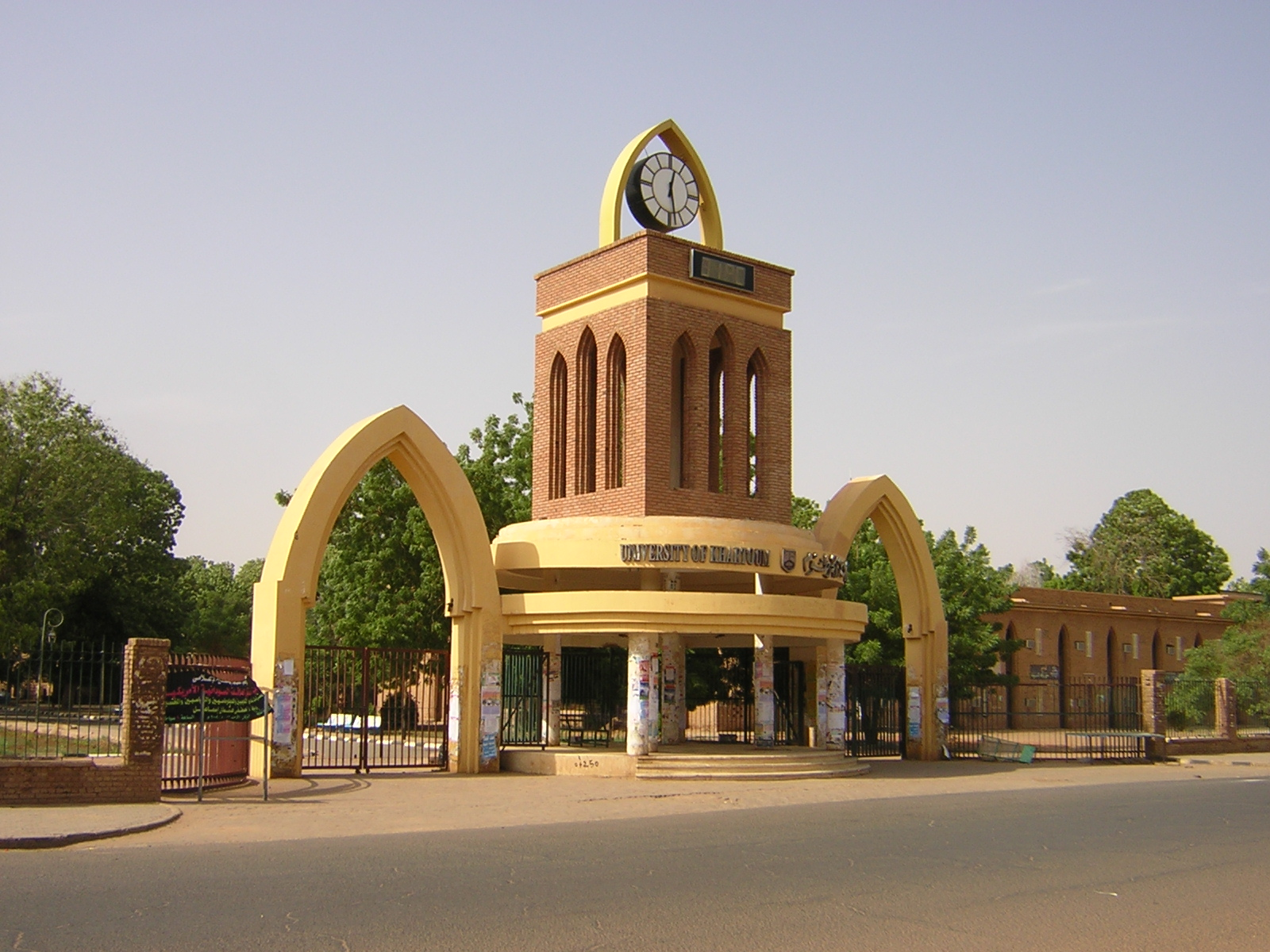
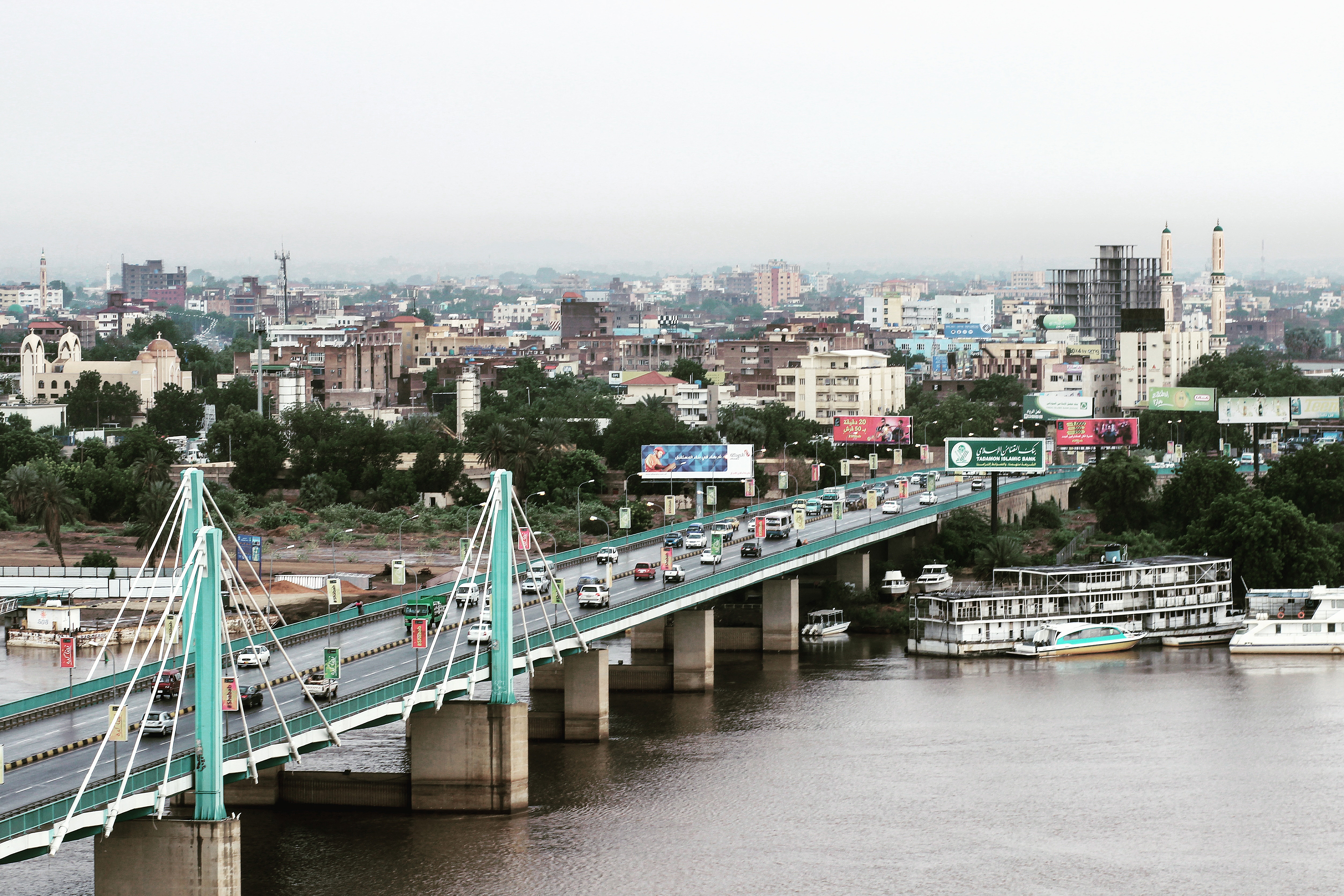
- Night view of Khartoum and of the White Nile Khartoum Mosque University of Khartoum El Mek Nimr Bridge

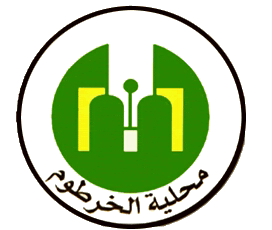
- Seal
- Nickname: Triangular Capital
- Location in Sudan and Africa Khartoum (Africa)
- Coordinates: 15°36′N 32°30′E
- Country: Sudan
- State: Khartoum

Area
  - Capital city: 322.7 km^{2} (124.6 sq mi)
  - Urban: 1,031 km^{2} (398 sq mi)
- Elevation: 381 m (1,250 ft)

Population (2025 est.)
  - Capital city: 1,974,647
  - Rank: 1st
  - Density: 6,119/km^{2} (15,850/sq mi)
  - Urban: 7,155,000 (est. 2023)
  - Urban density: 6,940/km^{2} (17,970/sq mi)
- Demonyms: Khartoumese, Khartoumian (the latter more properly designates a Mesolithic archaeological stratum)
- Time zone: UTC+02:00 (CAT)

Khartoum, also spelled Khartum, (Note: /kɑːrˈtuːm/ kar-TOOM; Arabic: الخرطوم, romanized: al-Khurṭūm, pronounced [al.xur.tˤuːm]) is the capital and most populous city of Sudan as well as Khartoum State. With an estimated population of 7.1 million people, Greater Khartoum is the largest urban area in Sudan.

Khartoum is located at the confluence of the White Nile – flowing north from Lake Victoria – and the Blue Nile, flowing west from Lake Tana in Ethiopia. Divided by these two parts of the Nile, the Khartoum metropolitan area is a tripartite metropolis consisting of Khartoum proper and linked by bridges to Khartoum North (الخرطوم بحري al-Kharṭūm Baḥrī) and Omdurman (أم درمان Umm Durmān) to the west. The place where the two Niles meet is known as al-Mogran or al-Muqran (المقرن; English: "The Confluence").

Khartoum was founded in 1821 by Muhammad Ali Pasha, north of the ancient city of Soba. In 1882, the British Empire took control of the Egyptian government, leaving the administration of Sudan in the hands of the Egyptians. At the outbreak of the Mahdist War, the British attempted to evacuate Anglo-Egyptian garrisons from Sudan but the Siege of Khartoum in 1884 resulted in the capture of the city by Mahdist forces and a massacre of the defending Anglo-Egyptian garrison. In 1898 it was reoccupied by British forces and was the seat of Anglo-Egyptian Sudan's government until 1956.

In 1956, the city was designated as the capital of an independent Sudan. Three hostages were killed during the attack on the Saudi Embassy in Khartoum in 1973.

In 2008, the Justice and Equality Movement engaged in combat in the city with the Sudanese Armed Forces as part of the War in Darfur. The Khartoum massacre occurred in 2019 during the Sudanese Revolution. Between 2023 and 2025, the city saw extensive combat during the civil war involving the armed forces and the Rapid Support Forces (RSF), affecting Khartoum International Airport and other critical sites. In 2025, the Sudanese armed forces recaptured Khartoum from the RSF, leaving widespread destruction.

Khartoum is an economic and trade center in North Africa, with rail lines from Port Sudan and El Obeid. It is served by Khartoum International Airport with the New Khartoum International Airport under construction. Several national and cultural institutions are in Khartoum and its metropolitan area, including the National Museum of Sudan, the Khalifa House Museum, the University of Khartoum, and the Sudan University of Science and Technology.

== Etymology ==
One folk etymology is that it is derived from Arabic khurṭūm (خرطوم 'trunk' or 'hose'), probably referring to the narrow strip of land extending between the Blue and White Niles.

Captain J.A. Grant, who reached Khartoum in 1863 with Captain Speke's expedition, thought the name was most probably from the Arabic qurṭum (قرطم 'safflower', i.e., Carthamus tinctorius), which was cultivated extensively in Egypt for its oil to be used as fuel. Some scholars speculate that the word derives from the Nubian word Agartum, meaning "the abode of Atum", Atum being the Nubian and Egyptian god of creation. Other Beja scholars suggest Khartoum is derived from the Beja word hartoom, "meeting". Sociologist Vincent J. Donovan notes that in the Nilotic Maa language of the Maasai people, khartoum means "we have acquired" and that the geographical location of Khartoum is where Maasai oral tradition claims that the ancestors of the Maasai first acquired cattle.

== History ==
=== 19th century ===
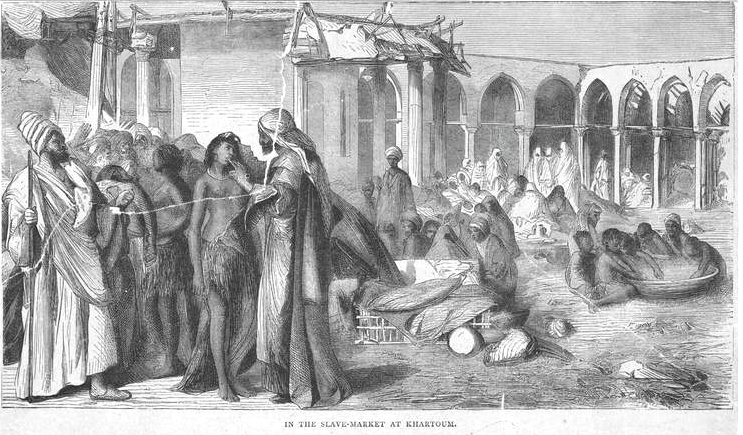
In the slave-market at Khartoum

In 1821, Khartoum was established 24 km (15 mi) north of the ancient city of Soba, by Isma'il Kamil Pasha, the third son of Egypt's ruler, Muhammad Ali Pasha, who had just incorporated Sudan into his realm. Originally, Khartoum served as an outpost for the Egyptian Army. Egypt shifted the seat of the colonial government from Wad Madani to Khartoum in 1823, which became a permanent settlement and underwent rapid development in the next decades. With its elevation to capital status, Khartoum quickly grew into a regional center of trade, serving as a rest area on the caravan route from Ethiopia to Egypt, but also becoming a major focal point for the slave trade.

A significant change took place in 1854, when most of the city was destroyed by heavy rains and floods. It was rebuilt with houses made out of mud and stones, replacing those made out of thatch and straw. Khartoum also became the seat of several European consulates and the Apostolic Vicariate of Central Africa. European pressure and influence forced Egypt to close the city's public slave market in 1854, although slaves continued to be sold and trafficked in large numbers, specifically from the Blue Nile region and the Nuba Mountains, as well as down the White Nile (the Dinka and Shilluk territories). According to the British explorer Samuel Baker, who visited Khartoum in 1862, slavery was the industry "that kept Khartoum going as a bustling town".

On 13 March 1884, troops loyal to the Mahdi Muhammad Ahmad began the siege of Khartoum against the Egyptian garrison led by the British General Charles George Gordon. Despite being fortified by trenches and a wall connecting the Blue and White Niles, the city was conquered by the Mahdists on 26 January 1885 and the entire garrison was annihilated. Many of the inhabitants were massacred or enslaved and the survivors were deported to the newly established Omdurman, while Khartoum was largely destroyed and abandoned.

With the reconquest of Sudan by Anglo-Egyptian forces in 1898, Khartoum was established as the capital of Anglo-Egyptian Sudan. Herbert Kitchener became Governor-General of the Sudan in September 1898, and began a programme of reconstruction, Khartoum was rebuilt according to a street plan in the shape of the Union Jack. Khartoum Bahri was established as a garrison comprising a dockyard and a railhead to Egypt, while Omdurman, remained the most populous part and largely kept its old shape. Kitchener ordered the mosques of Khartoum rebuilt and guaranteed freedom of religion to all citizens. He also prevented Christian missionaries from trying to proselytize the local Muslims.

=== 20th century ===
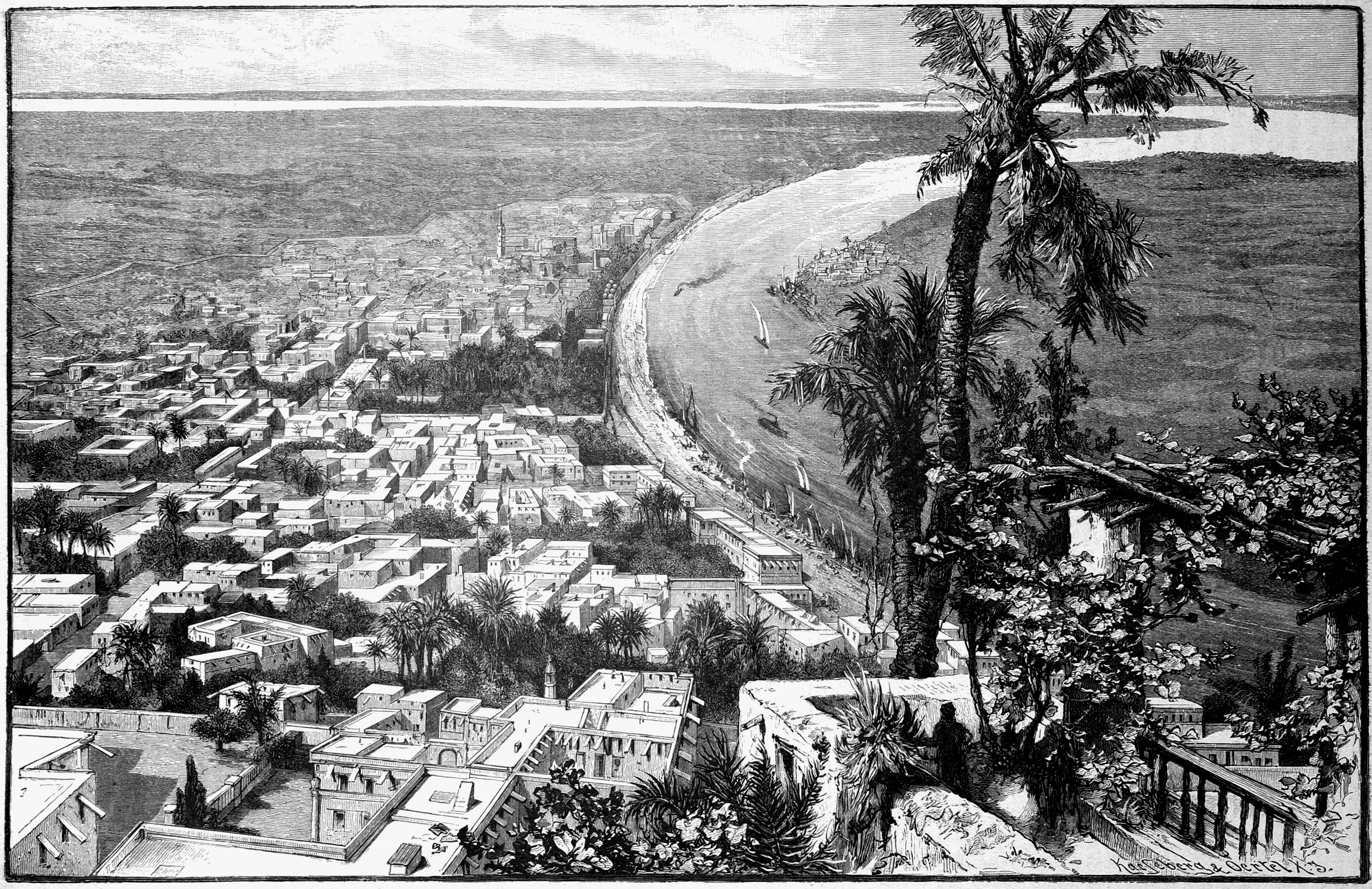
Khartoum in 1888

The city rapidly grew and developed under British administration. Under Reginald Wingate (1899–1916), the Governor-General's Palace in Khartoum was rebuilt using red bricks, with sandstone used for the corners. The buildings in Khartoum proper were modeled after Victorian architecture, with a distinct Middle Eastern influence as well as Mediterranean-style windows and balconies. The Gordon Memorial College (now the University of Khartoum) was opened in 1903, and a new railway to Port Sudan was completed in 1919. These developments prompted large migration from rural areas, resulting in an increase in the city's population. By 1930, Khartoum was estimated to have a population of over 50,000. Khartoum continued to grow after it was declared the capital of the newly independent Republic of Sudan in 1956. Within the following years, the Municipal Stadium, the Khartoum American School and the Bank of Sudan would be established. This large scale development would spurred rural to urban migration, by 1964 Khartoum's population had ballooned to 185,000. In the 1973 census Khartoum would have a population of 334,000 inhabitants.

In 1973, the city was the site of a hostage crisis in which members of Black September held 10 hostages at the Saudi Arabian embassy, five of them diplomats. The US ambassador, the US deputy ambassador, and the Belgian chargé d'affaires were murdered. The remaining hostages were released. A 1973 United States Department of State document, declassified in 2006, concluded: "The Khartoum operation was planned and carried out with the full knowledge and personal approval of Yasser Arafat."

In 1977, the first oil pipeline between Khartoum and Port Sudan was completed. The Organization of African Unity summit of 18–22 July 1978 was held in Khartoum, during which Sudan was awarded the OAU presidency.

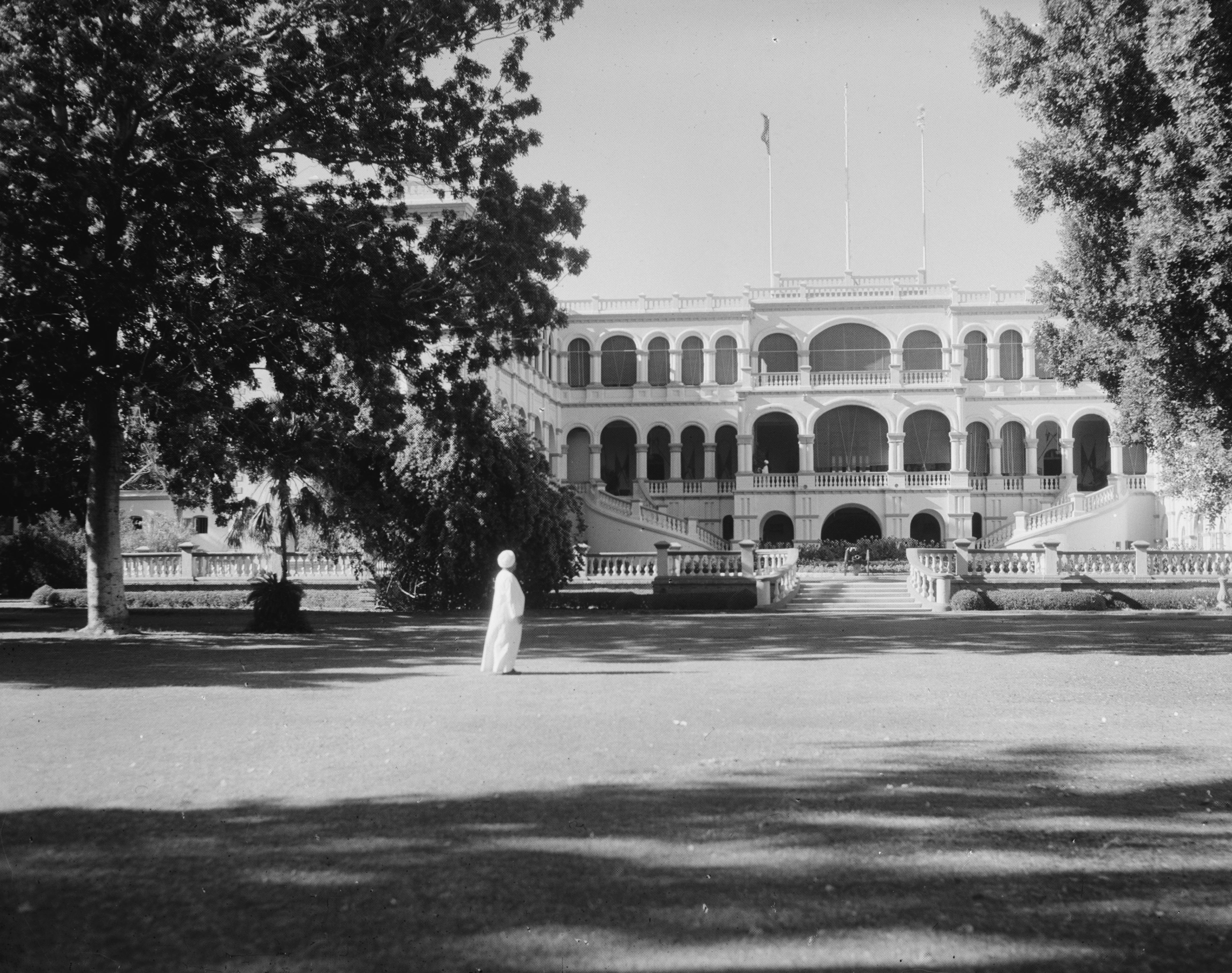
Government House (1936); now the Presidential Palace

Throughout the 1970s and 1980s, Khartoum was the destination of hundreds of thousands of refugees fleeing conflicts in neighboring nations such as Chad, Eritrea, Ethiopia and Uganda. Many Eritrean and Ethiopian refugees assimilated into society, while others settled in large slums on the city's outskirts. Since the mid-1980s, large numbers of refugees from South Sudan and Darfur – fleeing the violence of the Second Sudanese Civil War and Darfur conflict – have settled around Khartoum.

In 1991, Osama bin Laden purchased a house in the affluent al-Riyadh neighborhood of the city and another in Soba. He lived there until 1996, when he was banished from the country. Following the 1998 U.S. embassy bombings, the United States accused bin Laden's al-Qaeda group and, on 20 August, launched cruise missile attacks on the al-Shifa pharmaceutical factory in Khartoum North. The factory's destruction created diplomatic tension between the U.S. and Sudan. The factory ruins are now a tourist attraction.

In November 1991, the government of President Omar al-Bashir sought to remove half the population from the city. The residents, deemed squatters, were mostly southern Sudanese whom the government feared could be potential rebel sympathizers. Around 425,000 people were placed in five "Peace Camps" in the desert an hour's drive from Khartoum. The camps were watched over by heavily armed security guards, many relief agencies were banned from assisting, and "the nearest food was at a market four miles away, a vast journey in the desert heat". Many residents were reduced to having only burlap sacks as housing. The intentional displacement was part of a large urban renewal plan backed by the housing minister, Sharaf Bannaga.

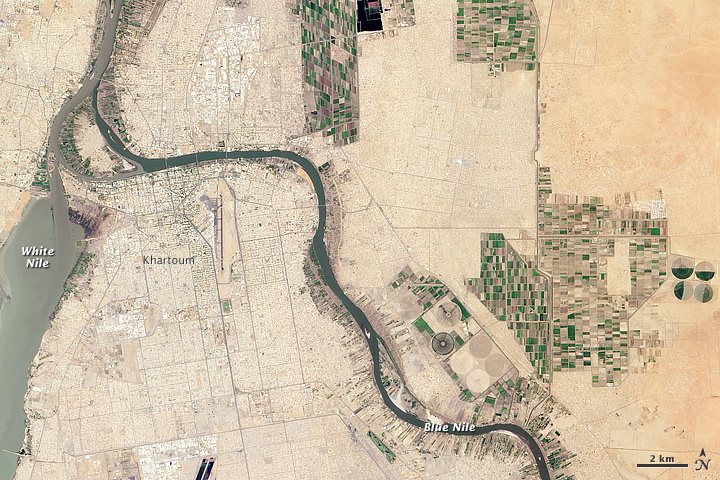
Khartoum with White and Blue Niles

=== 21st century ===
The sudden death of SPLA head and vice-president of Sudan John Garang in late July 2005, was followed by three days of violent riots in the capital. Order was finally restored after southern Sudanese politicians and tribal leaders sent strong messages to the rioters. The death toll was at least 24, as youths from southern Sudan attacked northern Sudanese and clashed with security forces.

The African Union summit of 16–24 January 2006 was held in Khartoum; as was the Arab League summit of 28–29 March 2006, during which they elected Sudan the Arab League presidency.

On 10 May 2008, the Darfur rebel group Justice and Equality Movement attacked the city with the goal of toppling Omar al-Bashir's government. The Sudanese government held off the assault.

On 23 October 2012, an explosion at the Yarmouk munitions factory killed two people and injured another person. The Sudanese government claimed that the explosion was the result of an Israeli airstrike.

On 3 June 2019, Khartoum was the site of the Khartoum massacre, where over 100 dissidents were murdered (the government said 61 were killed), hundreds more injured and 70 women raped by Rapid Support Forces (RSF) soldiers in order to forcefully disperse the peaceful protests calling for a civilian government.

On 1 July 2020, activists demanded that al-Zibar Basha street in Khartoum be renamed. Al-Zubayr Rahma Mansur was a slave trader and the al-Zibar Basha street leads to the military base where the 2019 Khartoum massacre took place.

On 26 October 2021, the city was locked down following a military coup that left at least 7 dead, triggering protests and calls for a general strike. Prime minister Abdalla Hamdok was arrested during the coup, and held along with other cabinet members in an unknown location.

On 15 April 2023, fighting between the Sudanese Armed Forces and the RSF broke out across Sudan, including in Khartoum. Fighting was reported at the presidential palace, the RSF's headquarters, Khartoum International Airport and Merowe Airport, which the RSF claimed to have captured. The Sudanese Armed Forces regained full control of Khartoum on 26 March 2025.

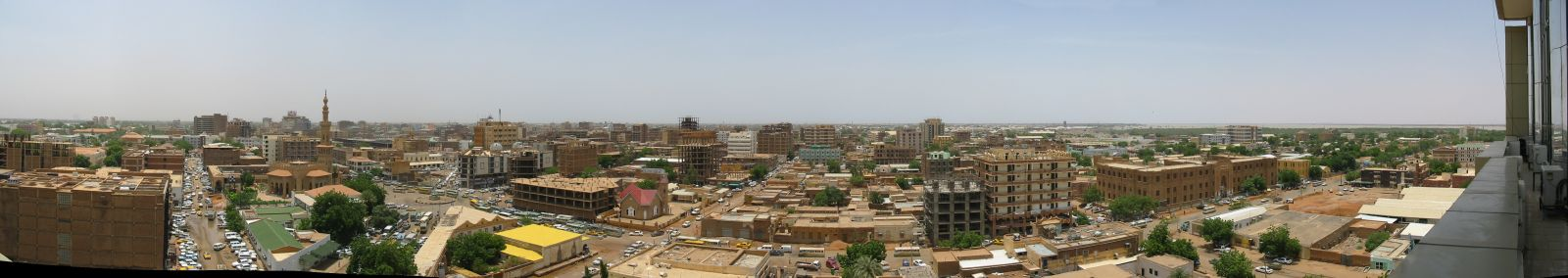
Panorama of Khartoum

== Geography ==
Khartoum (center) is near the middle of the Nile river system

=== Location ===
Khartoum is located at the confluence of the Blue Nile and the White Nile.

Khartoum is relatively flat, at elevation 385 m (1,263 ft), as the Nile flows northeast past Omdurman to Shendi, at elevation 364 m (1,194 ft) about 163 km (101 mi) away.

=== Climate ===
Khartoum features a hot desert climate (Köppen BWh) with a dry season occurring during winter, typical of the Saharo-Sahelian zone, which marks the progressive passage between the Sahara Desert's vast arid areas and the Sahel's vast semi-arid areas. The climate is extremely dry for most of the year, with about eight months when average rainfall is lower than 5 mm (0.20 in). The very long dry season is itself divided into a warm, very dry season between November and February, as well as a very hot, dry season between March and May. During this part of the year, hot, dry continental trade winds from deserts, such as the harmattan, sweep over the region; the weather is stable and very dry.

The very irregular, very brief, rainy season lasts about 1 month as the maximum rainfall is recorded in August, with about 48 mm (1.9 in). The rainy season is characterized by a seasonal reverse of wind regimes, when the Intertropical Convergence Zone goes northerly. Average annual rainfall is very low, with only 121.3 mm (4.78 in) of precipitation. Khartoum records on average six days with 10 mm (0.39 in) or more and 19 days with 1 mm (0.039 in) or more of rainfall. The highest temperatures occur during two periods in the year: the first at the late dry season, when average high temperatures consistently exceed 40 °C (104 °F) from April to June, and the second at the early dry season, when average high temperatures exceed 39 °C (102 °F) in September and October. Temperatures cool off somewhat during the night, with Khartoum's lowest average low temperature of the year, in January, just above 15 °C (59 °F). Khartoum is one of the hottest major cities on Earth, with annual mean temperatures hovering around 30 °C (86 °F). The city also has very warm winters. In no month does the average monthly high temperature fall below 30 °C (86 °F). This is something not seen in other major cities with hot desert climates, such as Riyadh, Baghdad and Phoenix.

Climate data for Khartoum (1991–2020)
Month	Jan	Feb	Mar	Apr	May	Jun	Jul	Aug	Sep	Oct	Nov	Dec	Year
Record high °C (°F)	42.7 (108.9)	42.5 (108.5)	45.6 (114.1)	46.5 (115.7)	47.5 (117.5)	46.5 (115.7)	44.7 (112.5)	44.0 (111.2)	45.3 (113.5)	43.5 (110.3)	41.5 (106.7)	39.5 (103.1)	47.5 (117.5)
Mean daily maximum °C (°F)	31.0 (87.8)	33.7 (92.7)	37.0 (98.6)	40.6 (105.1)	42.1 (107.8)	41.5 (106.7)	38.8 (101.8)	36.9 (98.4)	38.9 (102.0)	39.5 (103.1)	35.6 (96.1)	32.1 (89.8)	37.3 (99.1)
Daily mean °C (°F)	23.6 (74.5)	25.9 (78.6)	29.1 (84.4)	32.8 (91.0)	35.0 (95.0)	34.9 (94.8)	32.7 (90.9)	31.1 (88.0)	32.7 (90.9)	32.9 (91.2)	28.8 (83.8)	25.0 (77.0)	30.4 (86.7)
Mean daily minimum °C (°F)	16.1 (61.0)	18.0 (64.4)	21.1 (70.0)	24.9 (76.8)	27.9 (82.2)	28.2 (82.8)	26.7 (80.1)	25.4 (77.7)	26.5 (79.7)	26.4 (79.5)	22.0 (71.6)	18.0 (64.4)	23.4 (74.1)
Record low °C (°F)	7.5 (45.5)	8.4 (47.1)	12.5 (54.5)	16.0 (60.8)	18.5 (65.3)	20.2 (68.4)	17.8 (64.0)	18.0 (64.4)	17.7 (63.9)	17.5 (63.5)	14.5 (58.1)	10.4 (50.7)	7.5 (45.5)
Average precipitation mm (inches)	0.0 (0.0)	0.0 (0.0)	0.0 (0.0)	0.4 (0.02)	4.7 (0.19)	3.4 (0.13)	24.9 (0.98)	53.1 (2.09)	24.5 (0.96)	9.1 (0.36)	0.3 (0.01)	0.0 (0.0)	120.4 (4.74)
Average precipitation days	0.0	0.0	0.0	0.0	0.7	0.6	2.8	4.8	2.3	1.1	0.0	0.0	12.4
Average relative humidity (%)	26	21	16	14	19	26	42	53	44	30	25	29	29
Average dew point °C (°F)	3.0 (37.4)	1.9 (35.4)	0.7 (33.3)	1.8 (35.2)	7.9 (46.2)	12.5 (54.5)	18.1 (64.6)	20.4 (68.7)	18.8 (65.8)	13.0 (55.4)	6.8 (44.2)	5.7 (42.3)	9.2 (48.6)
Mean monthly sunshine hours	316.2	296.6	316.2	318.0	310.0	279.0	269.7	272.8	273.0	306.9	303.0	319.3	3,580.7
Mean daily sunshine hours	9.8	9.8	9.7	9.8	8.9	8.2	7.3	7.4	8.3	9.5	10.0	9.9	9.1
Source 1: World Meteorological Organisation, NOAA (extremes and humidity 1961–1990)
Source 2: Deutscher Wetterdienst (sun, 1961–1990)

== Demographics ==
Year	Population	
Year	City	Metropolitan area
1859	30,000	n.a.
1907	69,349	n.a.
1956	93,100	245,800
1973	333,906	748,300
1983	476,218	1,340,646
1993	947,483	2,919,773
2008 Census Preliminary	3,639,598	5,274,321

Almost 250,000 Syrians lived in Khartoum as of 2019, representing 5% of the total population of the city. Most are young men who have fled war in Syria. Sudan was the only country in the world to accept travelers carrying a Syrian passport who lacked a visa.

== Economy ==
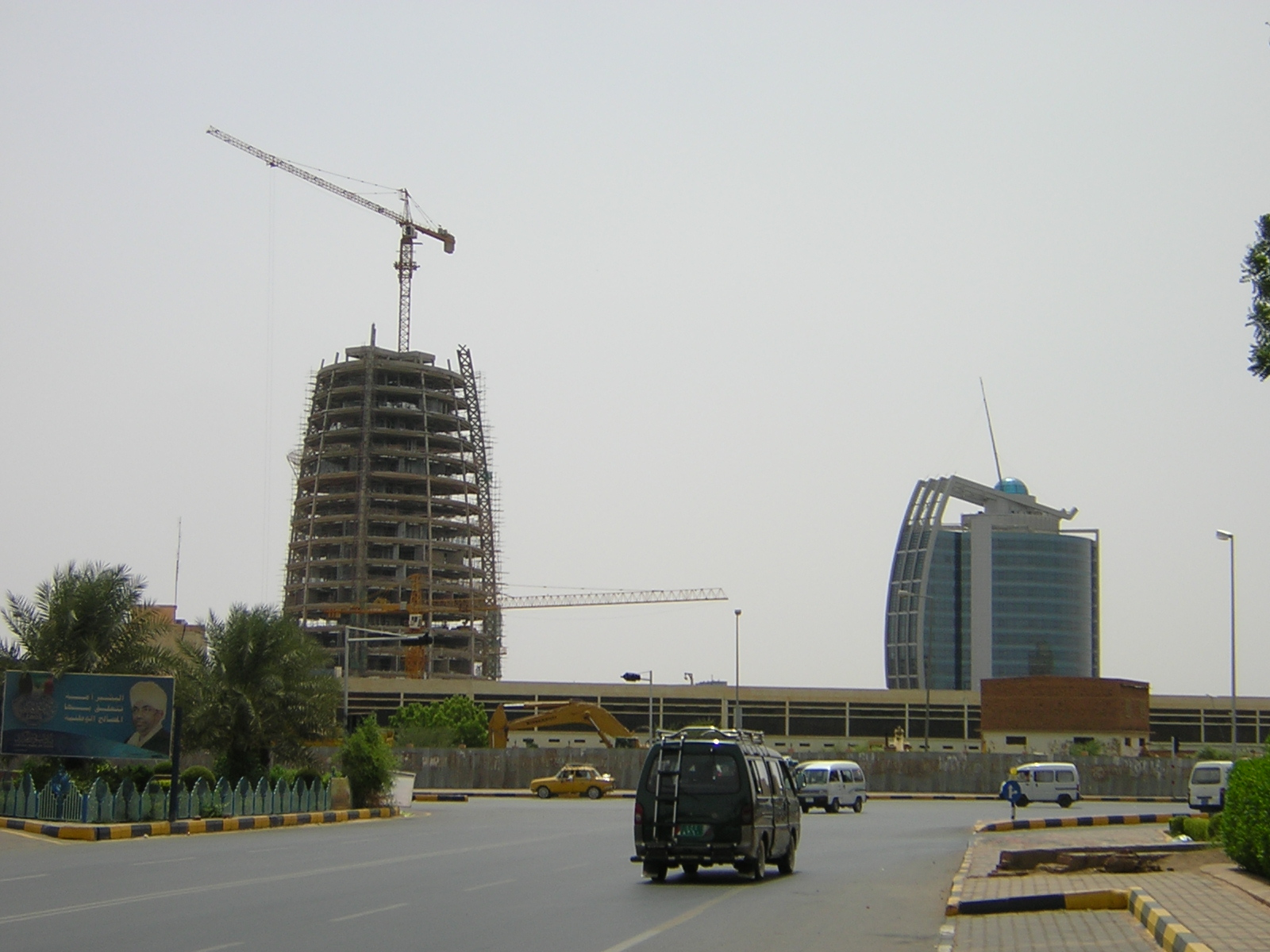
Development in Khartoum in 2009, with the PDOC Headquarters on right and the under-construction GNPOC Tower on left

After the signing of the historic Comprehensive Peace Agreement between the Government of Sudan and the Sudan People's Liberation Movement (SPLA), the Government of Sudan began a massive development project. In 2007, the biggest projects in Khartoum were the Al-Mogran Development Project, two five-star hotels, a new airport, El Mek Nimr Bridge (finished in October 2007) and the Tuti Bridge that links Khartoum to Tuti Island.

In the 21st century, Khartoum developed based on Sudan's oil wealth (although the independence of South Sudan in 2011 affected the economy of Sudan negatively). The center of the city has tree-lined streets. Khartoum has the highest concentration of economic activity in the country. This has changed as major economic developments take place in other parts of the country, like oil exploration in the south, the Giad Industrial Complex in Al Jazirah state and White Nile Sugar Project in Central Sudan, and the Merowe Dam in the North.

Among the city's industries are printing, glass manufacturing, food processing, and textiles. Petroleum products are now produced in the far north of Khartoum state, providing fuel and jobs for the city. One of Sudan's largest refineries is located in northern Khartoum.

=== Retailing ===
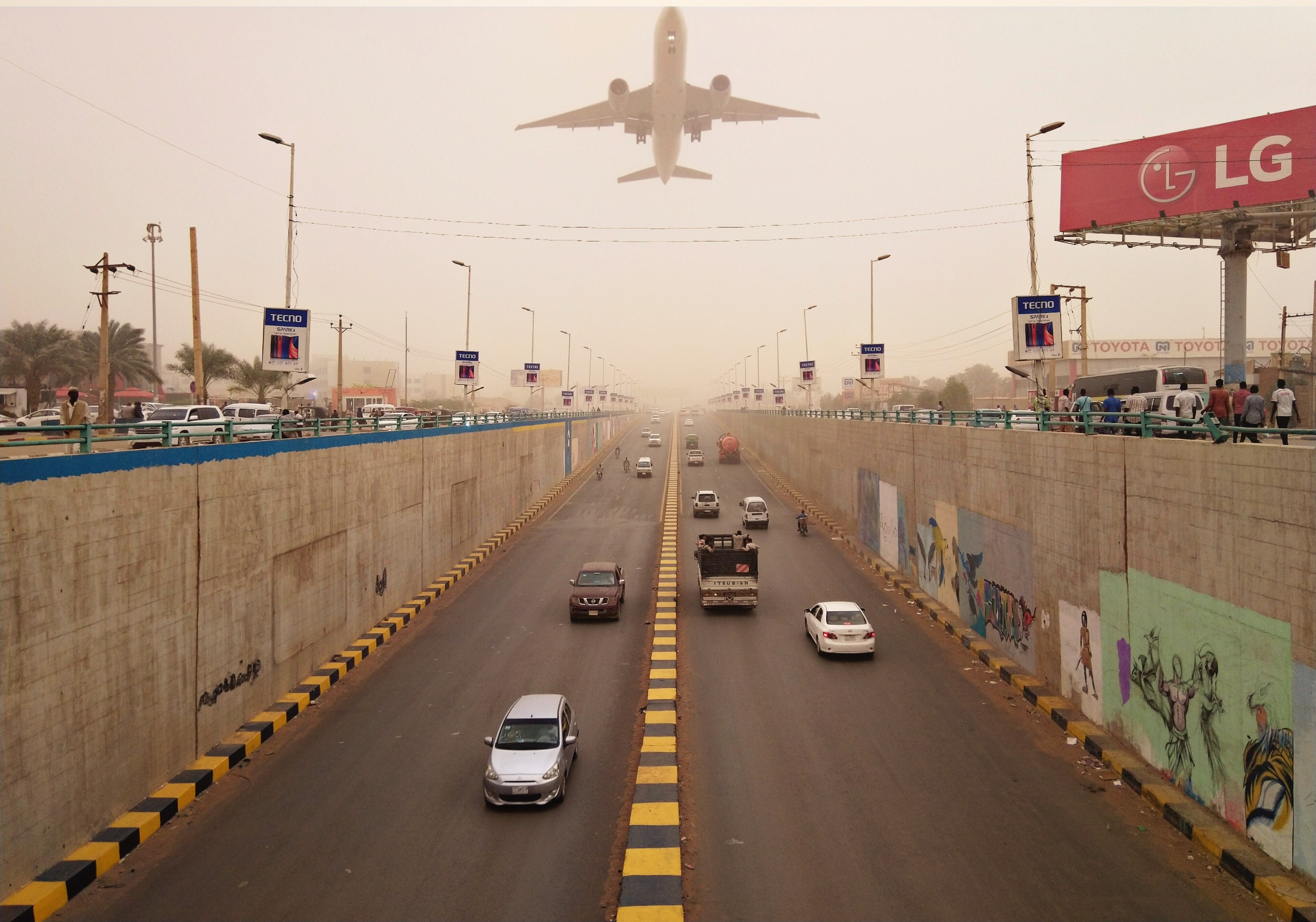
Africa road tunnel near the Khartoum International Airport

The Souq al Arabi is Khartoum's largest open air market. The souq is spread over several blocks in the center of Khartoum proper just south of the Great Mosque (Mesjid al-Kabir) and the minibus station. It is divided into separate sections, including one focused entirely on gold.

Al Qasr Street and Al Jamhoriyah Street are considered the most famous high streets in Khartoum State.

Afra Mall is located in the southern suburb of Arkeweet. The Afra Mall has a supermarket, retail outlets, coffee shops, a bowling alley, movie theaters, and a children's playground.

In 2011, Sudan opened the Hotel Section and part of the food court of the new, Corinthia Hotel Tower. The Mall/Shopping section is still under construction.

== Education ==
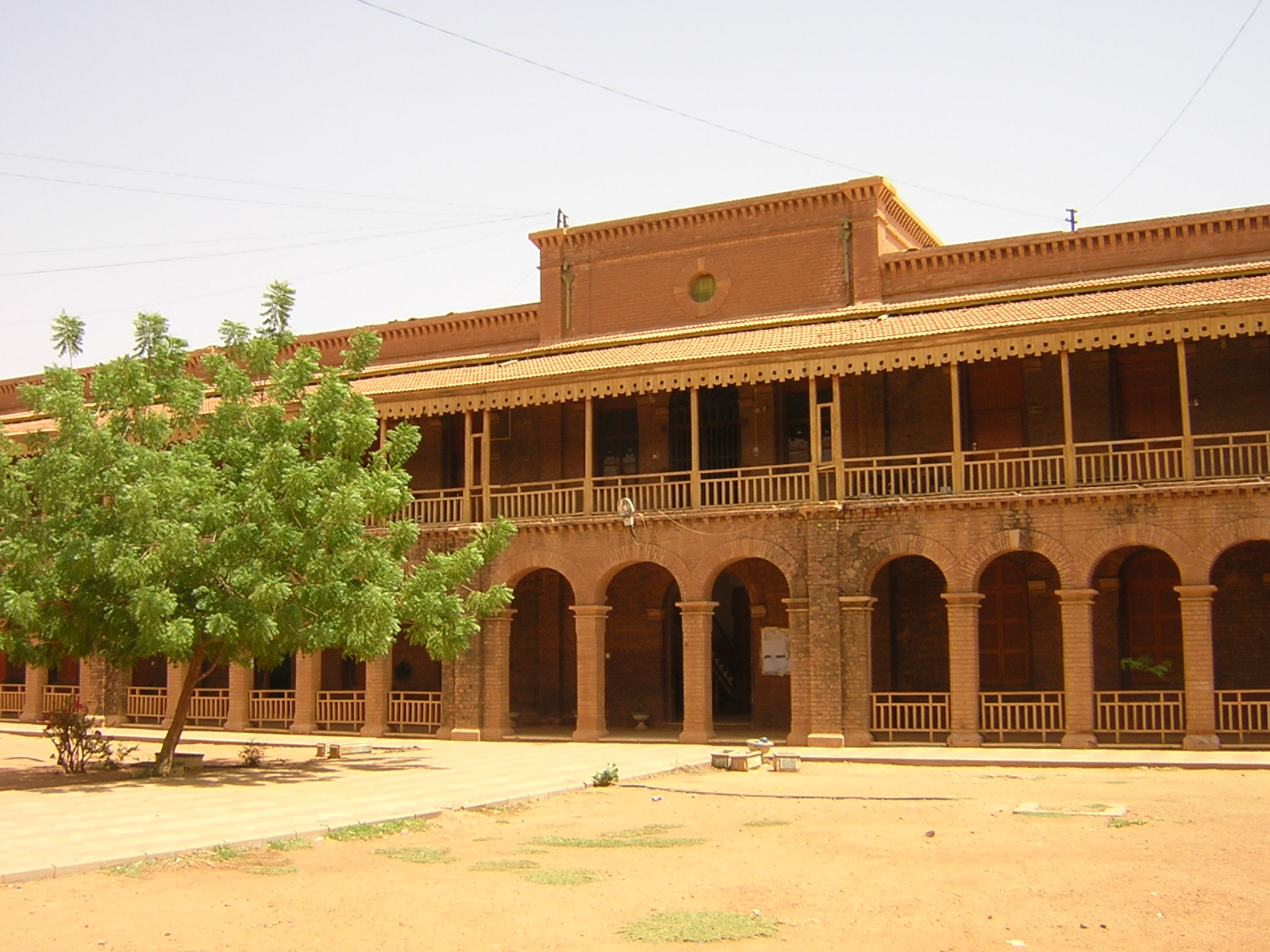
The University of Khartoum

Khartoum is the main location for most of Sudan's top educational bodies. There are four main levels of education:

1. Kindergarten and day-care. It begins in the age of 3–4, consisting of 1-2 grades, (depending on the parents).
2. Elementary school. The first grade pupils enter at the age of 6–7. It consists of 8 grades, after which, at 13–14 years old, students are ready to take the certificate exams and enter high school.
3. Upper second school and high school. In these three the school methods add some main academic subjects such as chemistry, biology, physics, and geography. There are three grades in this level. The students' ages are about 14–15 to 17–18.
4. Higher education. There are several universities and colleges in Khartoum, including the University of Khartoum and Sudan University of Science and Technology.

== Transportation ==
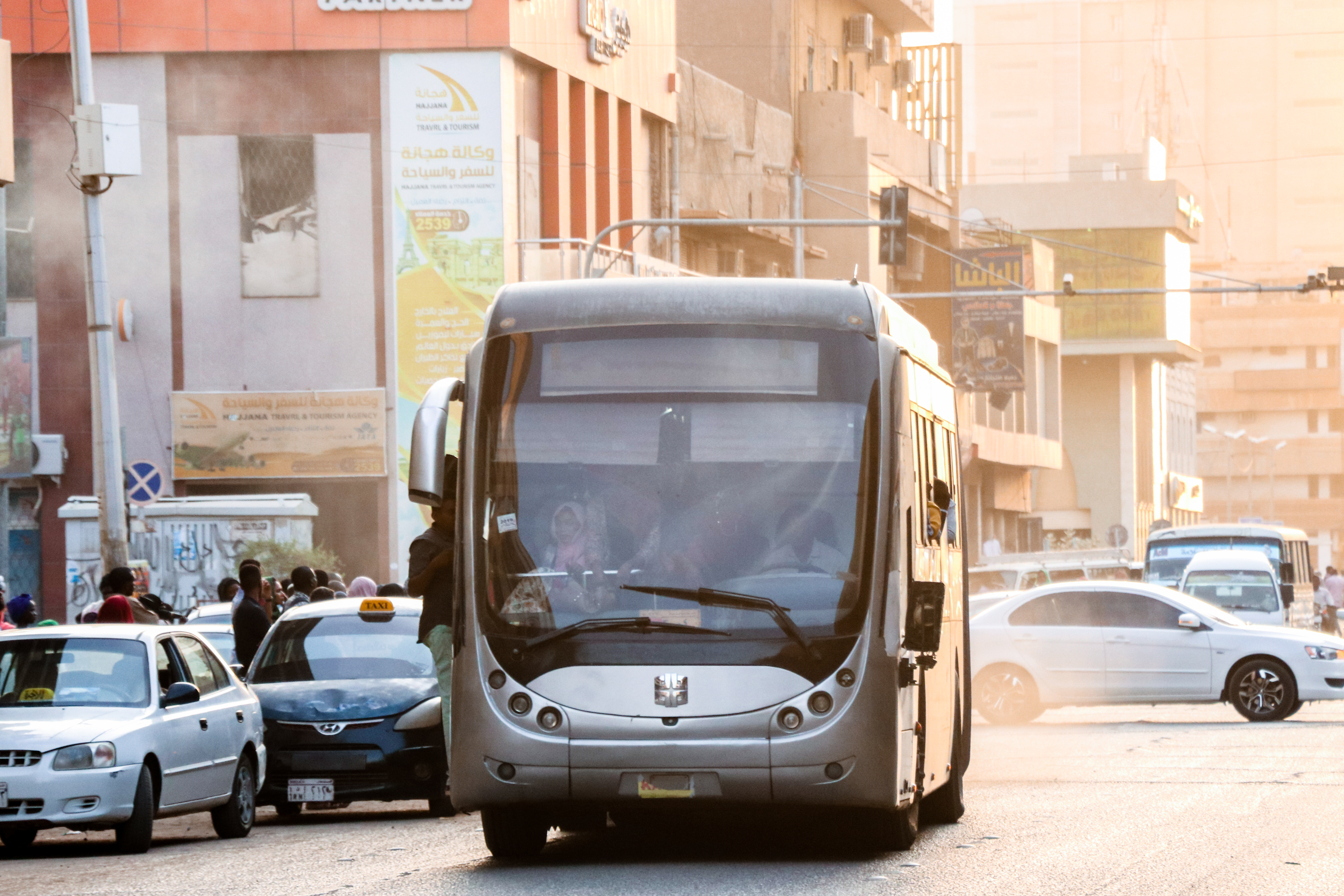
Khartoum public bus

Khartoum is home to the largest airport in Sudan, Khartoum International Airport. It is the main hub for Sudan Airways, Sudan's main carrier. A new airport was planned for the southern outskirts of the city, but with Khartoum's rapid growth and consequent urban sprawl, the airport is still located in the heart of the city.

Khartoum's transportation is limited to the vehicular road system, with buses and personal vehicles comprising the main types of vehicles. As with many cities in the continent, parts of Khartoum are connected through privately owned buses.

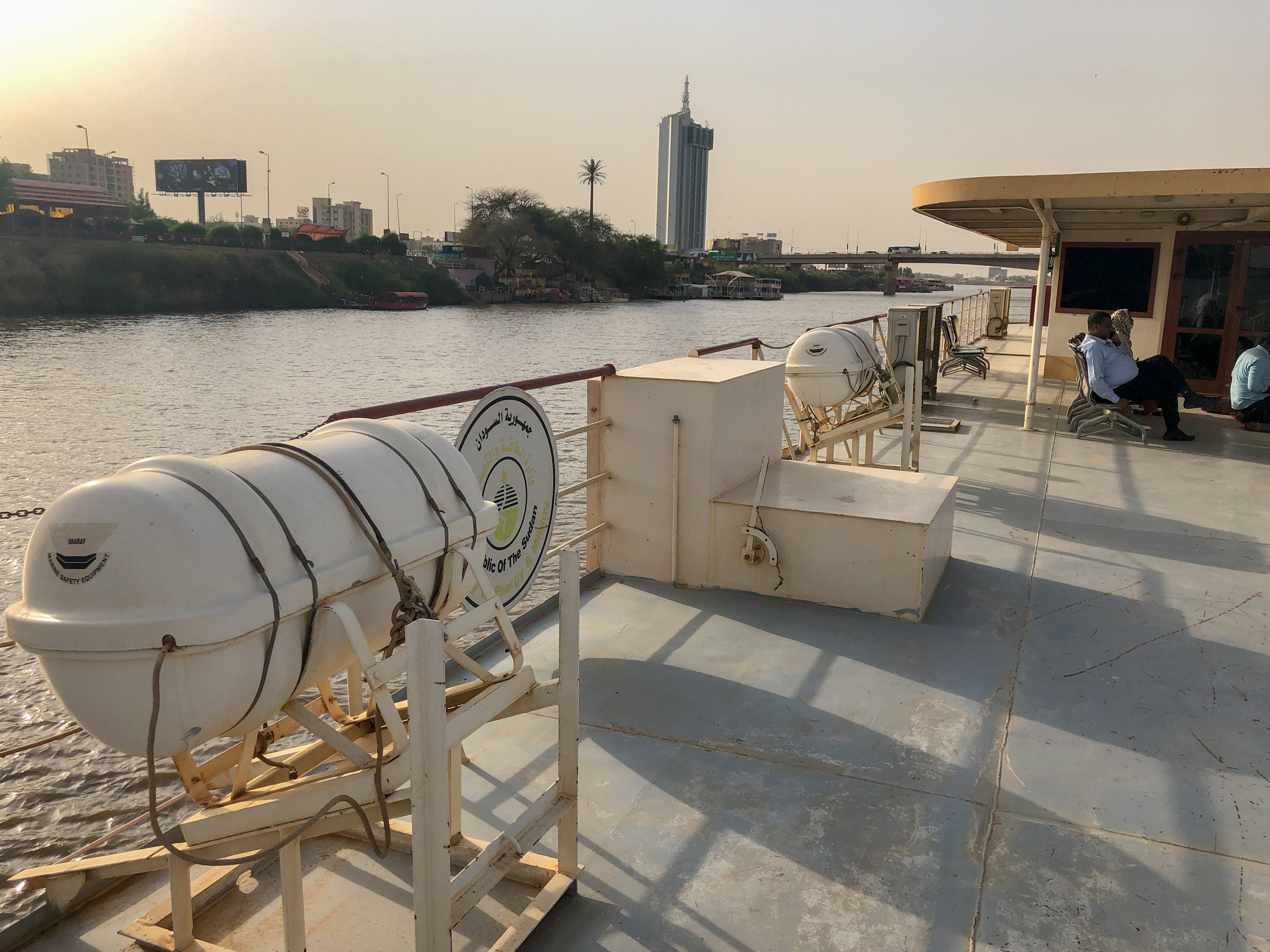
A boat on the Blue Nile before the Al Mansheiya Bridge.

Khartoum has a number of bridges across both tributaries of the Nile. The Mac Nimir Bridge, the Blue Nile Road & Railway Bridge, the Cooper Bridge (also known as the Armed Forces Bridge), and the Elmansheya Bridge span the Blue Nile, connecting Khartoum to Khartoum North. The Omdurman Bridge, the Victory Bridge, and the Al-Dabbasin Bridge span the White Nile, connecting Khartoum to Omdurman. The Tuti Bridge connects Tuti Island with Khartoum. Prior to the construction of the Tuti Bridge in 2008, residents of Tuti Island relied on water taxis to cross the Blue Nile into Khartoum.

Khartoum has rail lines from Wadi Halfa, Port Sudan on the Red Sea, and El Obeid. All are operated by Sudan Railways.

== Architecture ==
The architecture of Khartoum reflects the city's history since the early 1820s and is marked by both native Sudanese, Turkish, British and modern buildings. In general, the architecture of Sudan reflects a wide diversity in its shapes, materials, and use.

Since independence, the people of Sudan have introduced new infrastructure and technology, which has led to new and innovative building concepts, ideas and construction techniques.

== Culture ==
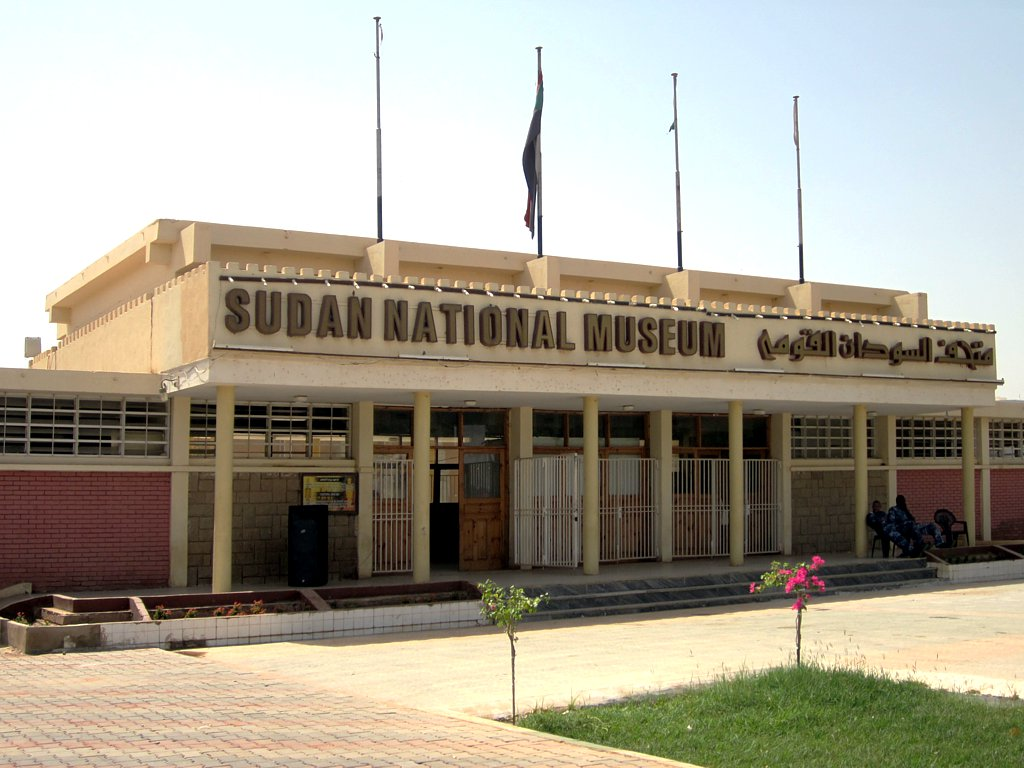
National Museum of Sudan

=== Museums ===
The largest museum in Sudan is the National Museum of Sudan. Founded in 1971, it contains works from different epochs of Sudanese history. Among the exhibits are two Egyptian temples of Buhen and Semna, originally built by Pharaoh Hatshepsut and Pharaoh Tuthmosis III, respectively, but relocated to Khartoum upon the flooding of Lake Nasser.

The Republican Palace Museum, opened in 2000, is located in the former Anglican All Saints' cathedral on Sharia al-Jama'a, next to the historical Presidential Palace.

The Ethnographic Museum is located on Sharia al-Jama'a, close to the Mac Nimir Bridge.

=== Botanical gardens ===
Khartoum is home to one of the oldest botanical gardens in Africa, National Botanical Garden in the Mogran district of the city.

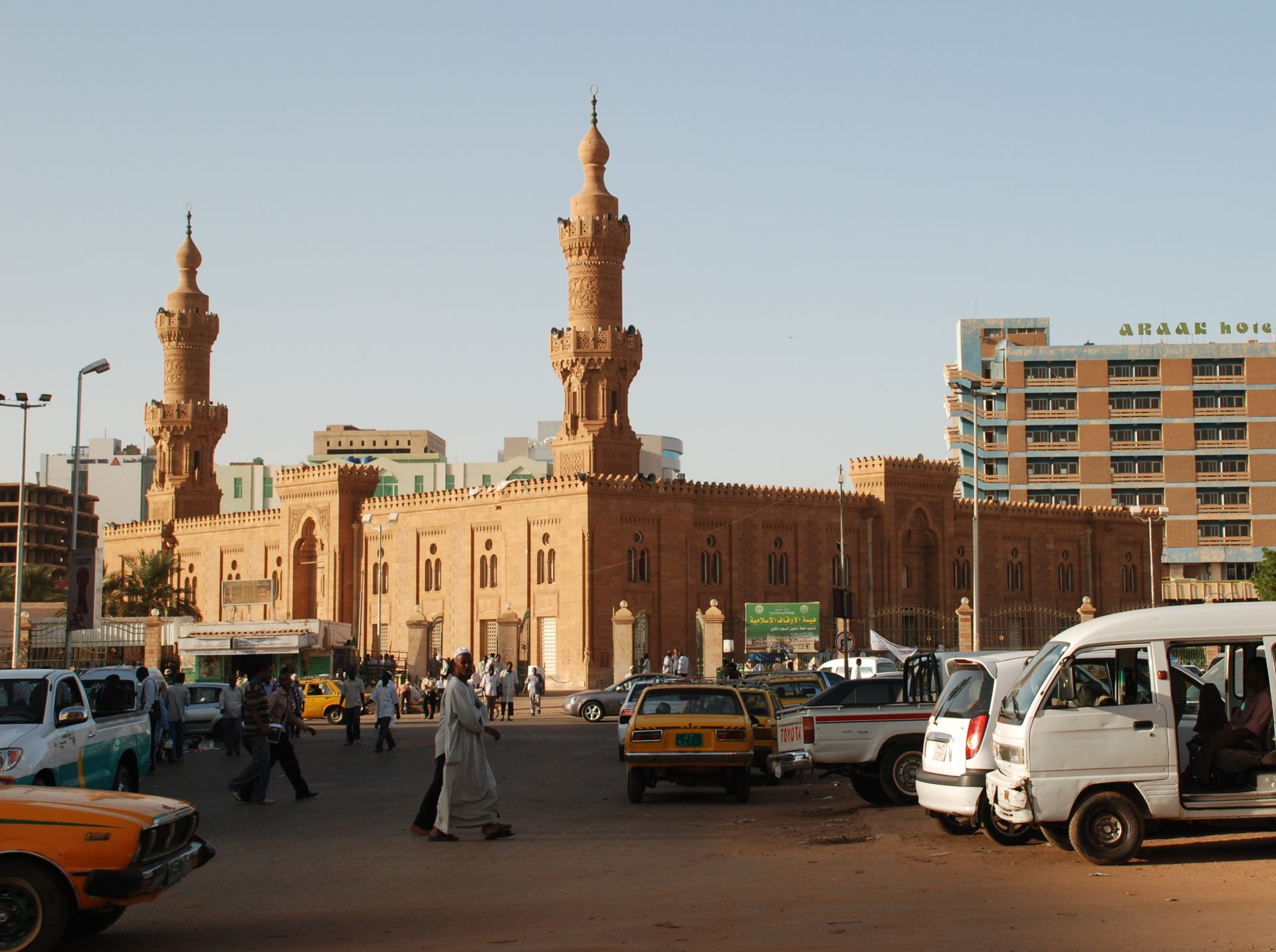
Great Mosque

=== Clubs ===
Khartoum is home to several clubs, including the Blue Nile Sailing Club, social clubs such as the German Club, the Greek Club, the Coptic Club, the Syrian Club and the International Club, as well as football clubs Al Khartoum SC and Al Ahli Khartoum.

=== Places of worship ===
The places of worship in Khartoum primarily consist of Muslim mosques. There are also Christian churches and temples: Coptic Orthodox Church, St. Matthew's Cathedral, Khartoum, Roman Catholic Archdiocese of Khartoum (Catholic Church), Sudan Interior Church (Baptist World Alliance), the Greek Orthodox Church of the Annunciation and Presbyterian Church in Sudan (World Communion of Reformed Churches).

== In popular culture ==
=== Literature ===
Khartoum's unique history and cultural significance have inspired literary works that explore its past, present, and future. For example, in "Reading Khartoum", the city is depicted as a space shaped by movement, political instability, and socio-cultural changes, resulting in underlying layers of meanings and ambiguity. Arabic-written poetry also offers a personalized glimpse of the city, reflecting its distinct cultural appearance and setting it apart from other Arab and African cities.

=== Movies ===
- Song of Khartoum (1955)
- Khartoum (1966)
- Khartoum Offside (2019)

== Notable people ==
- Sara Berkai, Eritrean and British social enterprise founder and STEM educator, born in Khartoum
- Mohamed Altoum, Sudanese photographer
- Amna Elhassan, visual artist and architect.
- Mohammad Omer Khalil, Sudanese-American artist
- Alaa Satir, visual artist
- Mahmoud Abdulaziz, singer
- Alsarah, singer
- Mazin Hamid, musician
