= International Women's Media Foundation awards =

The International Women's Media Foundation awards are annual prizes for women journalists awarded by the International Women's Media Foundation (IWMF) since its foundation in 1990: the Courage in Journalism Award (awarded since 1990); the Lifetime Achievement Award (awarded from 1991 to 2018); the Anja Niedringhaus Courage in Photojournalism Award (awarded since 2015); the Gwen Ifill Award (awarded since 2017); and the Wallis Annenberg Justice for Women Journalists Award (awarded since 2021).

The 2014 award ceremonies were on October 22 in New York, and October 29 in Los Angeles.

== Courage in Journalism Award ==
The Courage in Journalism Award, awarded annually since 1990, recognizes women who write from dangerous areas. Since 1990, more than 130 women from 54 countries have received the award.

1990

- Maria Jimena Duzan of Colombia
- Florica Ichim of Romania
- Caryle Murphy of the United States
- Lilianne Pierre-Paul of Haiti

1991

- Lyubov Kovalevskaya of Ukraine
- Marites Vitug of the Philippines

1992

- Catherine Gicheru of Kenya
- Kemal Kurspahic, Gordana Knezevic of Bosnia-Herzegovina
- Margaret Moth of New Zealand

1993

- Donna Ferrato of the United States
- Mirsada Hatibović-Šakić, Arijana Saračević Helać of Bosnia-Herzegovina
- Cecilia Valenzuela of Peru

1994

- Christiane Amanpour of the United States
- Razia Bhatti (1944–1996) of Pakistan
- Marie-Yolande Saint-Fleur of Haiti

1995

- Chris Anyanwu of Nigeria
- Horria Saihi of Algeria
- Gao Yu of China

1996

- Ayse Onal of Turkey
- Saida Ramadan of Sudan
- Lucy Sichone of Zambia

1997

- Bina Bektiati of Indonesia
- Corinne Dufka of the United States
- Maribel Gutierrez Moreno of Mexico

1998

- Elizabeth Neuffer (1956–2003) of the United States
- Blanca Rosales Valencia of Peru
- Anna Zarkova of Bulgaria

1999

- Sharifa Akhlas of Afghanistan
- Kim Bolan of Canada
- Afërdita Saraçini-Kelmendi of Kosovo

2000

- Marie Colvin (1956–2012) of the United Kingdom
- Agnes Nindorera of Burundi
- Zamira Sydykova of Kyrgyzstan

2001

- Amal Abbas of Sudan
- Jineth Bedoya Lima of Colombia
- Carmen Gurruchaga of Spain

2002

- Kathy Gannon of Canada
- Sandra Nyaira of Zimbabwe
- Anna Politkovskaya (1958–2006) of Russia

2003

- Anne Garrels of the United States
- Tatyana Goryachova of Ukraine
- Marielos Monzon of Guatemala

2004

- Gwen Lister of Namibia
- Mabel Rehnfeldt of Paraguay
- Salima Tlemcani of Algeria

2005

- Sumi Khan of Bangladesh
- Anja Niedringhaus (1965–2014) of Germany
- Shahla Sherkat of Iran

2006

- Jill Carroll of the United States
- May Chidiac of Lebanon

2007

- Lydia Cacho of Mexico
- Serkalem Fasil of Ethiopia
- McClatchy's Baghdad bureau (Shatha al Awsy, Zaineb Obeid, Huda Ahmed, Ban Adil Sarhan, Alaa Majeed, and Sahar Issa) of Iraq

2008

- Farida Nekzad of Afghanistan
- Sevgul Uludag of Cyprus
- Aye Aye Win of Myanmar

2009

- Jila Baniyaghoob of Iran
- Iryna Khalip of Belarus
- Agnes Taile of Cameroon

2010

- Claudia Julieta Duque of Colombia
- Vicky Ntetema of Tanzania
- Tsering Woeser of Tibet

2011

- Adela Navarro Bello of Mexico
- Parisa Hafezi of Iran
- Chiranuch Premchaiporn of Thailand

2012

- Reeyot Alemu of Ethiopia
- Asmaa Al-Ghoul of Palestine
- Khadija Ismayilova of Azerbaijan

2013

- Najiba Ayubi of Afghanistan
- Nour Kelze of Syria
- Bopha Phorn of Cambodia

2014

- Arwa Damon of the United States
- Solange Lusiku Nsimire of the Democratic Republic of the Congo
- Brankica Stanković of Serbia

2015

- Mwape Kumwenda of Zambia
- Anna Nemtsova of Russia
- Lourdes Ramirez of Honduras

2016

- Mabel Cáceres of Peru
- Janine di Giovanni of the United States, the United Kingdom, and France
- Stella Paul of India

2017

- Deborah Amos of the United States
- Saniya Toiken of Kazakhstan
- Hadeel al-Yamani of Yemen

2018

- Meridith Kohut of the United States
- Nima Elbagir of Sudan and the United Kingdom
- Rosario Mosso Castro of Mexico
- Zehra Doğan of Turkey

2019

- Anna Babinets of Ukraine
- Anna Nimiriano of South Sudan
- Liz Sly of the United Kingdom
- Lucía Pineda Ubau of Nicaragua
- Anastasia Stanko of Ukraine

2020

- Gulchehra Hoja of China and the United States
- Jessikka Aro of Finland
- Solafa Magdy of Egypt
- Yakeen Bido of Syria

2021

- Khabar Lahariya of India
- Paola Ugaz of Peru
- Vanessa Charlot of the United States

2022

- Cerise Castle of the United States
- Lynsey Addario of Ukraine and the United States
- Victoria Roshchyna of Ukraine

2023

- María Teresa Montaño Delgado of Mexico
- Shireen Abu Akleh of Palestine and the United States
- Women of The Washington Post Reporting on Ukraine: Isabelle Khurshudyan, Anastacia Galouchka, Kamila Hrabchuk, Siobhán O'Grady, Whitney Shefte, Whitney Leaming, Heidi Levine, Louisa Loveluck, Missy Ryan, Samantha Schmidt, Loveday Morris, Kasia Strek, Joyce Koh and Miriam Berger.

2024

- Lauren Chooljian of the United States
- Mónica Velásquez Villacís of Ecuador
- Maha Hussaini of Palestine (revoked)

2025

- Sana Atef, operating pseudonymously from Afghanistan
- Juliana Dal Piva of Brazil
- Yousra Elbagir of Sudan and United Kingdom
- Maritza Lizeth Gallego Félix of the United States / Mexico

2026

- Georgia Fort, United States
- Elaheh Mohammadi, Iran
- Elnaz Mohammadi, Iran
- Nay Min Ni (pseud.), Myanmar

== Lifetime Achievement Award ==
The Lifetime Achievement Award was awarded annually from 1991 to 2018.

1992

- Barbara Walters of the United States

1993

- Nan Robertson (1926–2009) of the United States

1994

- Katharine Graham (1917–2001) of the United States

1995

- Helen Thomas (1920–2013) of United States

1996

- Meg Greenfield (1930–1999) of United States

1997

- Nancy Woodhull (1945–1997) of the United States

1998

- Bonnie Angelo of the United States

1999

- Peggy Peterman (1936–2004) of the United States

2000

- Flora Lewis (1922–2002) of the United States

2001

- Colleen "Koky" Dishon (1924–2004) of the United States

2002

- Mary McGrory (1918–2004) of the United States

2003

- Magdalena Ruiz of Argentina

2004

- Belva Davis of United States

2005

- Molly Ivins (1944–2007) of the United States

2006

- Elena Poniatowska of Mexico

2007

- Peta Thornycroft of Zimbabwe

2008

- Edith Lederer of United States

2009

- Amira Hass of Israel

2010

- Alma Guillermoprieto of Mexico

2011

- Kate Adie of the United Kingdom

2012

- Zubeida Mustafa of Pakistan

2013

- Edna Machirori of Zimbabwe

2015

- Linda Deutsch of the United States

2016

- Diane Rehm of the United States

2017

- Andrea Mitchell of the United States

2018

- Lesley Stahl of the United States.

== Anja Niedringhaus Courage in Photojournalism Award ==
The Anja Niedringhaus Courage in Photojournalism Award, awarded annually since 2015, is named after Anja Niedringhaus, the photojournalist killed in Afghanistan during the 2014 Afghan presidential election.

2015

- Heidi Levine of the United States
- Anastasia Vlasova of Ukraine (honorable mention)
- Rebecca Blackwell of the United States (honorable mention)

2016

- Adriane Ohanesian of the United States
- Lynsey Addario of the United States (honorable mention)
- Paula Bronstein of the United States (honorable mention)

2017

- Stephanie Sinclair of the United States
- Louisa Gouliamaki of Greece and Poland (honorable mention)
- Nicole Tung of the United States and Hong Kong (honorable mention)

2018

- Andrea Bruce of the United States
- Amber Bracken of Canada (honorable mention)
- Rebecca Conway of the United Kingdom (honorable mention)

2019

- Eloisa Lopez of the Philippines
- Mary F. Calvert of the United States (honorable mention)
- Tasneem Alsultan of Saudi Arabia and the United States (honorable mention)

2020

- Masrat Zahra of Kashmir
- Laurel Chor of Hong Kong (honorable mention)
- Nahira Montcourt of Puerto Rico (honorable mention)

2021

- Fatima Shbair of Palestine
- Adriana Zehbrauskas of Brazil (honorable mention)
- Kiana Hayeri of Iran and Canada (honorable mention)

2022

- Paula Bronstein of the United States
- Farzana Wahidy of Afghanistan (honorable mention)
- Carol Guzy of the United States (honorable mention)

2023

- Laurence Geai of France
- Yunghi Kim of the United States and South Korea (honorable mention)
- Véronique de Viguerie of France (honorable mention)

2024

- Samar Abu Elouf of Palestine
- Anastasia Taylor-Lind of the United Kingdom and Sweden (honorable mention)
- Nariman Ayman El-Mofty of Egypt and Canada (honorable mention)

2025

- Johanna Maria Fritz of Germany
- Adriana Loureiro Fernández of Venezuela (honorable mention)
- Nicole Tung of the United States and Hong Kong (honorable mention)

== Gwen Ifill Award ==
The Gwen Ifill Award, awarded annually since 2017, is an award for U.S. women and non-binary journalists of color working in the news media. It is named in honor of the memory of PBS Newshour co-anchor Gwen Ifill.

2017

- Michele Norris

2018

- Karen Toulon

2019

- Nikole Hannah-Jones

2020

- Yamiche Alcindor

2021

- Sisi Wei

2022

- Mc Nelly Torres

2023

- Karen Grigsby Bates

2024

- Tasneem Raja

2025

- Errin Haines

== Wallis Annenberg Justice for Women Journalists Award ==
The Wallis Annenberg Justice for Women Journalists Award has been awarded annually since 2021. It "brings attention to women journalists who are detained, jailed or imprisoned". It is named after the American philanthropist Wallis Annenberg.

2026

- Frenchie Mae Cumpio of the Philippines

2021

- Katsiaryna Andreyeva of Belarus
- Darya Chultsova of Belarus

2022

- Xueqin (Sophia) Huang of China

2023

- Yalda Moaiery of Iran

2024

- Shin Daewe of Myanmar

2025

- Aynur Elgunesh, Azerbaijani journalist editor-in-chief of Meydan TV
