= Kizelovsky =

Kizelovsky (masculine), Kizelovskaya (feminine), or Kizelovskoye (neuter) may refer to:

- Kizelovsky Municipal District, a municipal formation which the town of krai significance of Kizel in Perm Krai, Russia is incorporated as
- Kizelovskoye Urban Settlement, a municipal formation in Kizelovsky Municipal District of Perm Krai, Russia, which the town of Kizel and the rural locality (a crossing loop) of posyolok Rasik are incorporated as
