= Alexander Vinidiktov =

Russian politician (1950–2026)

- Александр Винидиктов

Deputy of the 3rd State Duma
- In office 7 October 2001 – 7 December 2003

Personal details
- Born: 10 June 1950 Kizel, Perm Oblast, Russian SFSR, Soviet Union
- Died: 15 June 2026 (aged 76) Moscow, Russia
- Profession: Politician

Alexander Nikolaevich Vinidiktov (Russian: Александр Николаевич Винидиктов; 10 June 1950 – 15 June 2026) was a Russian politician who was a deputy of the 3rd State Duma from 2001 to 2003.

Vinidiktov also was the first director of the Svobodny Cosmodrome from 1997 to 2001.

== Life and career ==
Vinidiktov was born in Kizel, Perm Oblast on 10 June 1950.

He graduated from the Perm Higher Command and Engineering School in 1972 and in 1990, he graduated from the Military Academy of the General Staff of the USSR Armed Forces. After completing his studies, he entered government and military service.

In 1997, Vinidiktov was appointed the first head of the Svobodny Cosmodrome. In 2001, in the by-elections to the 3rd State Duma, Vinidiktov won by a small margin over the candidate from the Communist Party of the Russian Federation Dmitry Novikov. While serving as a member of the State Duma, Vinidiktov was a member of the Committee on State Building.

Vinidiktov died in Moscow on 15 June 2026, at the age of 76.
