= Saniya =

Saniya or Saniyya or Saniyah is a feminine given name. Notable people with the name include:

- Saniya Anklesaria, Indian actress
- Saniya Chong (born 1994), American basketball player
- Saniya Habboub (1901–1983), Lebanese physician
- Saniyah Hall (born 2008), American basketball player
- Saniya Iyappan (born 2002), Indian actress
- Saniya Naz (born 1988), Pakistani politician
- Saniya Rivers (born 2003), American basketball player
- Sania Saleh (born Saniya Saleh; 1935–1985), Syrian writer and poet
- Saniya Shaikh (born 1992), Indian sports shooter
- Saniya Shamshad (born 1990), Pakistani actress and model
- Saniyya Sidney (born 2006), American actress
- Saniya Toiken (born 1969), Kazakh journalist
- Saniyah Zia (born 1985), Pakistani-born Canadian cricketer
