= Lyubov Kovalevskaya =

Soviet and Ukrainian journalist (born 1953)

- Любов Ковалевська
- Born: 6 January 1953 (age 73); Yerki, Sverdlovsk Oblast, Russian SSR, USSR
- Citizenship: Soviet Union (until 1991); Ukraine
- Education: Nizhny Tagil State Socio-Pedagogical Institute
- Occupation: Teacher
- Employer: Chernobyl Nuclear Power Plant
- Awards: Courage in Journalism Award (1991)

Lyubov Aleksandrovna Kovalevskaya (Russian: Любовь Александровна Ковалевская, Ukrainian: Любов Олександрівна Ковалевська; born 6 January 1953) is a Soviet and Ukrainian journalist. She became well known following the Chernobyl disaster for articles she had published raising concerns about the Chernobyl Nuclear Power Plant prior to the explosion. In 1991, Kovalevskaya received the International Women's Media Foundation Courage in Journalism Award.

== Biography ==
Kovalevskaya was born in the village of Yerki in Sverdlovsk Oblast in what was then the Russian Soviet Federative Socialist Republic. In 1976, she graduated from the Nizhny Tagil State Socio-Pedagogical Institute, and spent time teaching at a rural school near Alapayevsk.

In 1977, Kovalevskaya moved to Pripyat, Kyiv Oblast in what was then the Ukrainian Soviet Socialist Republic, where she worked as a teacher. In 1979, she became the editor of Tribuna Enerhetika (Ukrainian: Трибуна енергетика, lit. 'Energy Tribune'), the newspaper of the Chernobyl Nuclear Power Plant.

On 26 March 1986, an article by Kovalevskaya entitled "Not a private matter" (Ukrainian: Не приватна справа, romanized: Ne privatna sprava) initially written for Tribuna Enerhetika was republished in the weekly newspaper Literaturna Ukrayina, in which she highlighted problems in the construction of the Chernobyl Nuclear Power Plant and the likelihood of it resulting in a disaster in "a matter of time". Exactly a month later, the no. 4 reactor at Chernobyl exploded, resulting in the Chernobyl disaster. The article increased in popularity following the disaster and gained Kovalevskaya international attention; during a visit to Kyiv in 1998, the Vice President of the United States, Al Gore, mentioned her several times in a speech at the Ukrainian National Chernobyl Museum.

Kovalevskaya was in Pripyat during the explosion and received a dose of radiation; she was later diagnosed with thyroid cancer. Following the disaster, she was evacuated to Kyiv, where she studied the social, environmental and political impacts of the explosion, including by making over 30 visits to the exclusion zone. She went on to take part in an anti-nuclear demonstration in Germany and was persecuted by the KGB for her public criticisms of the Soviet nuclear programme.

In 1991, Kovalevskaya was announced as the laureate of that year's Courage in Journalism Award, given by the International Women's Media Foundation.

Between 2000 and 2001, Kovalevskaya worked for the Ukrainian newspaper The Day. In 2003, she moved to Ryazan in Russia.
