= Andrey Koryakovcev =

Russian scientist

- Born: November 23, 1966; Kirov
- Education: PhD in Philosophical Sciences
- Alma mater: Ural State University
- Occupation: Sociologist, historian, philosopher
- Employer: Ural State Pedagogical University
- Website: web.archive.org/web/20170608054553/http://koryakovtsev.narod.ru:80/

Andrey Alexandrovich Koryakovcev (Koryakovtsev) (Russian: Андрей Александрович Коряковцев; born 23 November 1966 in Kirov, Kirov Oblast) is a Russian scientist, philosopher and sociologist, author. He is scholar of Marxism, PhD, Docent of the Ural State Pedagogical University. He is also a political analyst. He is an expert at the Institute for the New Society. Laureate of the Regional Prize for Best Book.

His mother is an English teacher. He graduated from the Ural State University. In the 1990s he hitchhiked across Eastern Europe.

Koryakovcev is a member of the Union of Russian Writers. Currently lives in Yekaterinburg.

He is author of more than 70 scientific papers and two monographs.
