= Victoria Roshchyna =

Ukrainian journalist (1996–2024)

- Вікторія Рощина
- Born: Victoria Volodymyrivna Roshchyna; 6 October 1996; Zaporizhzhia, Zaporizhzhia Oblast, Ukraine
- Died: 19 September 2024 (aged 27); SIZO-3, Kizel, Perm Krai, Russia
- Cause of death: Disputed: Murder by strangulation (Ukrainian claim); Heart failure (Russian claim)
- Occupation: Journalist

Victoria Volodymyrivna Roshchyna (Ukrainian: Вікторія Володимирівна Рощина; 6 October 1996 – 19 September 2024 (Note: According to Russian officials, although not confirmed from other sources as of 13 October 2024)) was a Ukrainian journalist who reported on the Russian invasion of Ukraine and the Siege of Mariupol. She was a recipient of the International Women's Media Foundation's 2022 Courage in Journalism Award.

Roshchyna disappeared in August 2023, and in October 2024 was confirmed to have died in Russian detention. When Roshchyna's body was returned to Ukraine, it bore signs of torture, strangulation and had some organs removed. The Ukrainian government announced it would investigate her death as a potential murder and war crime.

On 24 September 2025, the Ukrainian Prosecutor General's Office informed that Roshchyna died on 19 September 2024 in the detention centre No. 3 (SIZO No. 3) in the city of Kizel in Perm Krai, Russia.

== Early life ==
Victoria Roshchyna was born on 6 October 1996. Roshchyna's hometown was Zaporizhzhia. She had one sister.

== Career ==
Victoria Roshchyna began working as a journalist when she was a teenager, covering court decisions and crime. After the 2022 Russian invasion and occupation of Eastern Ukraine, she started to write about living in Russian-occupied areas of Ukraine and the Siege of Mariupol. She worked as a freelance journalist for Ukrainska Pravda, Radio Free Europe, and Hromadske.

She was detained by the Russian military in Vasylivka in March 2022, but managed to escape after hiding in a basement overnight.

In early March 2022, her car was fired on by Russian tanks. She and her driver escaped, but her computer and camera were stolen. On 11 March Roshchyna was detained in Berdiansk by the Russian Federal Security Service for ten days. She was allowed to go free only after she made a videotape stating that the Russian forces had saved her life. She wrote an article about her time in captivity for Hromadske. Later that year, she was given a Courage in Journalism Award by the International Women's Media Foundation (IWMF). She refused to attend the award ceremony, so she could instead focus on her reporting.

== Disappearance and death ==
In July 2023, Roshchyna went to Russian-occupied eastern Ukraine, possibly to report on the Zaporizhzhia Nuclear Power Plant crisis and the destruction of the Kakhovka Dam. To enter the territory, she planned to go through Poland and Russia. She told her family on 3 August 2023 that she had passed through the border checks; it was the last time they heard from her. They reported her as missing on 12 August, and officially filed a report on 21 September. Her disappearance was made public on 4 October 2023 by her family, through reports in The Daily Beast and Ukrainska Pravda. According to Anna Nemtsova, the author of The Daily Beast article and friend of Roshchyna's, she published the article "to raise hell" and out of hope that if Roshchyna was still alive, her captors would "stop torturing her".

Around 22 April 2024, her father Volodymyr Mykhaylovych received a letter dated 17 April 2024 from the Russian government which confirmed that they were holding Roshchyna in detention.

The IWMF called her detention "unjust" and the European Union described it as "illegal" and "arbitrary". Human rights activist Svetlana Gannushkina announced she had written to Tatyana Moskalkova, then Commissioner for Human Rights in Russia, asking for an update on Roshchyna's status. Sevgil Musayeva, her editor at Ukrainska Pravda, and the National Union of Journalists of Ukraine called for her immediate release.

Her death was announced on 10 October 2024 by Petro Yatsenko of the Coordination Headquarters for the Treatment of Prisoners of War. In a letter to her family, Russian officials said that she had died on 19 September 2024. A report by the Ukrainian investigative outlet Slidstvo stated that she had died in a detention facility the town of Kizel in Perm Krai, where she had been transferred eight days before in a journey that took three days. Her cause of death remains unknown. Russian news organization Mediazona reported that she was in the process of being transferred to Moscow at the time of her death. According to the Defense Intelligence of Ukraine, Roshchyna was on a prisoner exchange list and was being held in SIZO-2 in the Russian city of Taganrog. The Ukrainian NGO Media Initiative for Human Rights also said that she had been held in penal colony number 77 in Berdiansk prior to her transfer to Taganrog. Both centres have been accused of torturing prisoners. According to The Guardian, the most frequently used methods include electric shocks, waterboarding, mock executions, beatings with wooden and metal hammers, repeated strikes to the same body part, and various forms of degrading humiliation.

Reporters Without Borders, the IWMF, the European Union, and the Committee to Protect Journalists called for an investigation into her death and detention. On 11 October, the Prosecutor General of Ukraine announced it was treating her disappearance as a potential murder and a war crime. President of Ukraine Volodymyr Zelenskyy described her death as "a real blow" to journalists in Ukraine.

Roshchyna's body was returned to Ukraine in February 2025 following DNA identification. Her body arrived in a batch of 757 bodies as part of exchange, marked as "unidentified male" but examination by forensic experts indicated the body was of a female, and DNA analysis confirmed Roshchyna's identity. The body had signs of post mortem dissection conducted in Russia and abrasions, bruises, a broken rib consistent with signs of torture and burns likely from electric shocks. The brain, both eyeballs, and part of the trachea were missing, which forensic experts interpreted as an attempt to obscure the cause of death, likely strangulation or suffocation. A bruise on the neck indicated a potential hyoid bone fracture, often resulting from manual strangulation. Labels accompanying the body also contained Russian acronym СПАС for Total Arterial Damage of the Heart, which was likely the official cause of death assigned by Russian pathologists. The body also underwent partial mummification due to long storage, further obscuring causes of death.

A new forensic examination conducted on July 9, 2025 by the Main Bureau of Forensic Medical Examination of the Ministry of Health of Ukraine, revealed that Roshchyna had a neck injury, bone fractures, haemorrhages in the soft tissues of the temporal region, right shoulder and shins, and a contusion on the left foot.

On 7 August 2025, Ukrainian prosecutors charged the administrator of Detention Center No. 2, in Rostov Oblast in absentia with the torture and death of Roshchyna. The administrator remains unidentified. On 8 August 2025, funeral ceremonies for Roshchyna were held at the St. Michael's Golden-Domed Monastery and Maidan Nezalezhnosti in Kyiv, followed by her burial in a cemetery in the city.

== Publications ==
- Roshchyna, Victoria (26 March 2022). "Тиждень у полоні окупантів. Як я вибралася з рук ФСБ, «кадирівців» і дагестанців" [A week in captivity of the occupiers. How I got out of the hands of the FSB, "Kadyrovets" and Dagestanis]. Hromadske.

== See also ==
- List of journalists killed during the Russo-Ukrainian War
- Suspicious Russia-related deaths since 2022
