= Najiba Ayubi =

Afghan journalist and activist

- Pashto: نجیبه ایوبی
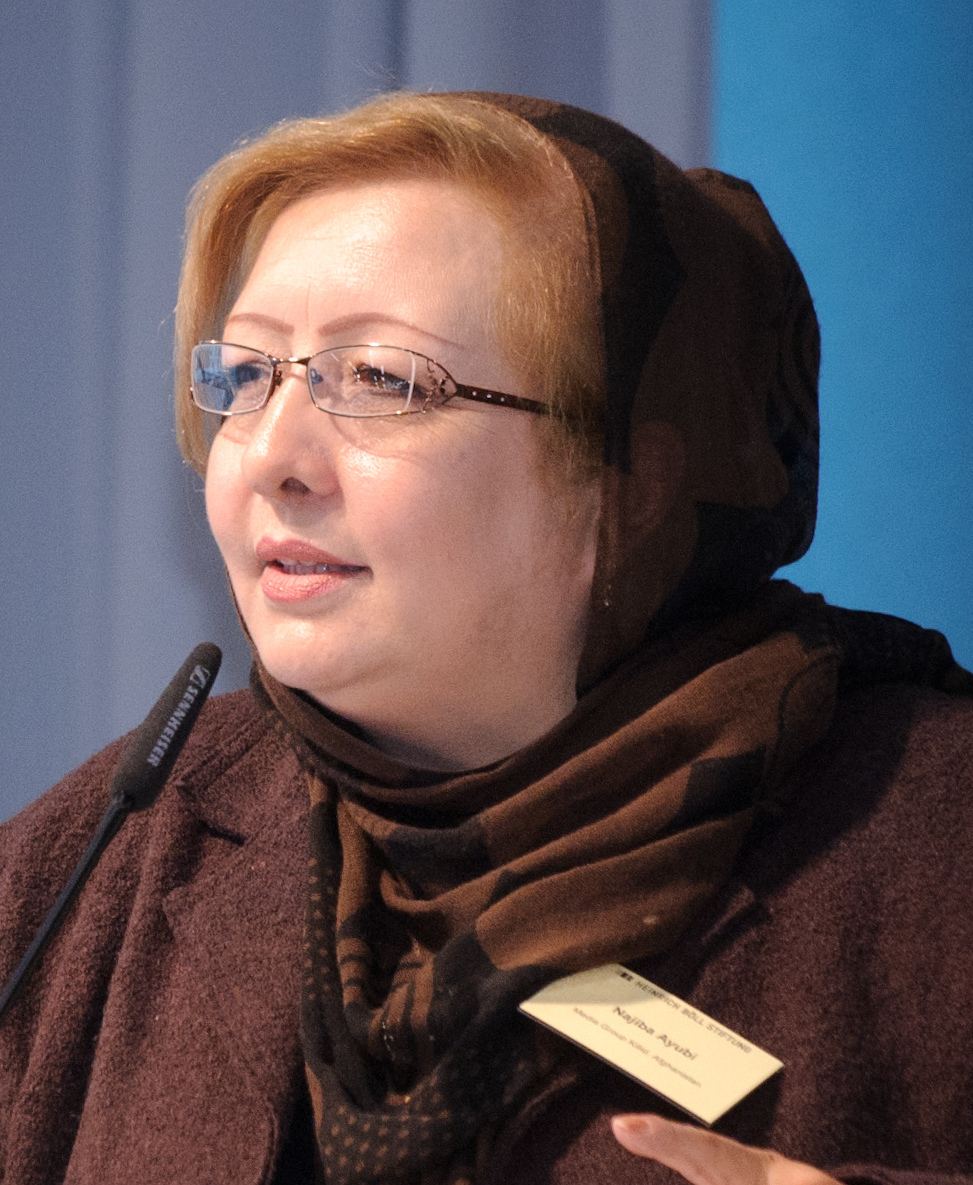
- Ayubi in 2011
- Born: Afghanistan
- Occupations: Journalist, activist
- Awards: Courage in Journalism Award (2013); Said Jamaludin (2016)

Najiba Ayubi (Pashto: نجیبه ایوبی) is an Afghan journalist and activist for human rights and freedom of the press.

== Life ==
Ayubi and her family moved to Iran in 1996 during Taliban's rise to power where she founded a school to educate Afghans in Iran. She returned to Afghanistan in 2001 to work for Save the Children. Ayubi later became the managing director of The Killid Group, a nonprofit media network. Despite anonymous threats and attacks from the government, Ayubi rejects censorship and leads a team of reporters publishing topics ranging from politics to women's rights. In one instance, politicians sent gunmen to her home. Ayubi was one of three women awarded the 2013 Courage in Journalism Award. In 2014, she was named one of the 100 Information Heroes by Reporters Without Borders. In 2015, Ayubi was nominated by Ashraf Ghani to lead the Ministry of Women's Affairs but was not confirmed by the National Assembly. In 2016, she was awarded the Said Jamaludin (transl. Afghan prize for culture) by President Ghani.
