= Caryle Murphy =

American journalist (1946–2026)

Caryle Marie Murphy (November 16, 1946 – October 19, 2026) was an American journalist. Her awards include the Pulitzer Prize.

== Working life ==
Murphy worked in America as a reporter for The Washington Post and for The Christian Science Monitor. She worked for the GlobalPost and The National while in Saudi Arabia. As a foreign correspondent for The Washington Post, she reported in the following regions: South Africa (following the Soweto uprising and Steve Biko slaying by the police); Cairo as bureau chief, in charge of Arab world coverage; and Kuwait during border crossing and subsequent Emirate occupation by Iraqi forces. She was part of the team covering the Gulf War from Southern Arabia, and she was a reporter for three months during a tour of duty in Baghdad.

Her U.S. reporting included the following areas: American immigration policy, the federal court in Alexandria, Virginia, and religion.

She was also a public policy scholar at the Woodrow Wilson International Center for Scholars in Washington, D.C.

Murphy is probably best known for her coverage of Iraqi-occupied Kuwait and the Gulf War (1990–1991) that ensued.

== Personal life and death ==
Carole Marie Murphy was born on November 16, 1946, in Hartford, Connecticut, and grew up in Massachusetts. She graduated from Trinity University in Washington, D.C., and from Johns Hopkins University's School of Advanced International Studies. In the 1960s, she changed the spelling of her first name to "Caryle" from "Carole".

She married Herbert Howe in 2017. Murphy died from viral pneumonia in October 19, 2026, at the age of 79, in Fairfax County, Virginia. She also had pulmonary fibrosis and underwent a lung transplant in 2018.

== Publications ==
Murphy wrote two books: Passion for Islam: Shaping the Modern Middle East: The Egyptian Experience, and A Kingdom's Future: Saudi Arabia Through the Eyes of its Twentysomethings. Emran Qureshi's Washington Post book review said of Passion for Islam:

Caryle Murphy's careful reporting and cogent analysis present readers with an indispensable opportunity to understand how the variegated strands of Islam—tolerant reformist traditions as well as militant anti-Western ones—have taken root in the Arab world's most vital civilization.

== Awards ==
Murphy received many awards including:

- The George Polk Award for Foreign Reporting (1990)
- The Courage in Journalism Award from the International Women's Media Foundation (1990)
- Pulitzer Prize for International Reporting (1991)
- Edward Weintal Diplomatic Reporting Prize (1991)
- The Robert F. Kennedy Journalism Award (1994)
- Edward R. Murrow Press Fellowship, Council on Foreign Relations (1994–1995)
- Knight Luce Fellowship for Reporting on Global Religion (2011)
