= Agnès Nindorera =

Burundian journalist

- Born: 1962
- Citizenship: Burundi
- Education: University of Burundi
- Occupation: Journalist

Agnès Nindorera (August 18, 1962 – January 13, 2023) was a Burundian journalist known for her coverage of the Burundian Civil War for various national and international publications. As co-founder of the Burundian Association of Women Journalists (AFJO), she led the organization from 1999 to 2001 and 2017 to 2019. In 2000, she was honored with an International Women's Media Foundation Award.

== Biography ==
Agnès Nindorera was born in Burundi's Gitega Province in 1962. She studied journalism at the University of Burundi, at Vrije Universiteit Brussel, and later as a Nieman Fellow at Harvard University.

Nindorera began her journalism career in Burundi in the early 1990s. In 1995, she founded and served as editor in chief of the short-lived independent news outlet Le Phare, becoming one of only a few Burundian women to helm her own publication. She also wrote for various local and international publications including Le Renouveau du Burundi, Voice of America, and Agence France-Presse. She gained particular recognition for her work with the independent radio station Studio Ijambo.

During the Burundian Civil War, Nindorera faced significant opposition to her work, including threats from law enforcement officers, multiple arrests, and persistent harassment. On one occasion, a powerful politician threatened that she would be shot in the head in response to her work. She also faced pressure from members of her own Tutsi-affiliated Ganwa clan over her willingness to bridge gaps with Hutus. Nonetheless, she continued to report on human rights violations during the conflict, in which she personally lost dozens of relatives. In 2000, she received a Courage in Journalism Award from the International Women's Media Foundation for her work.

In 1997, Nindorera co-founded the Burundian Association of Women Journalists, known by the French acronym AFJO. She served as chair of AFJO from 1999 to 2001 and from 2017 to 2019.

She died in 2023, at age 60, after a brief illness.
