= Andrea Bruce (photographer) =

- Born: 1973
- Education: University of North Carolina at Chapel Hill
- Known for: Photojournalism, Documentary photography
- Awards: Anja Niedringhaus Courage in Photojournalism Award (2018)

Andrea Bruce (born 1973) is an American photojournalist and documentary photographer. She is based in Athens, Georgia.

She has been named Photographer of the Year by the White House News Photographers Association (WHNPA). She was awarded the John Faber Award from the Overseas Press Club, and Anja Niedringhaus Courage in Photojournalism Award.

== Life ==
Andrea Bruce graduated from the University of North Carolina at Chapel Hill. After graduating, she worked for The Concord Monitor and The St. Petersburg Times.

Through documentary photography, Andrea Bruce focuses her reports mainly on people living in the aftermath of the war. It focuses on social issues that are sometimes ignored, or greatly intensified in the wake of war. She is also one of the correspondents of the National Geographic.

Her work is the subject of international exhibitions and is presented in museums such as the Museum of Fine Arts in Houston with the exhibition War/Photography, the Third Floor Gallery with Arab Revolutions, and the Museo Nacional de Arte Moderno "Carlos Mérida" with Enamored.

For more than ten years, Andrea Bruce chronicled the most troubled regions in the world, focusing on Iraq and Afghanistan, for The Washington Post, then as an independent photographer as part of the VII network. In 2003, she began working in Iraq, following the complexities and obstacles of the conflict experienced by the Iraqis and the American army. She is also the author of a weekly column for The Washington Post, entitled Unseen Iraq.

Andrea Bruce's Our Democracy project sought to push people to look beyond politics and examine the social conditions that underlie society, by providing a visual recording of the state of local democracy in the United States. Throughout the CatchLight exchange, the photojournalist immersed herself in a different community every month. She use visual and audio narratives to explore experiences and reflections on contemporary democracy in the United States. The project also takes place online, through the presence of an interactive map of the route, accompanied by multimedia content, and data on the social and political commitment of each community.

== Exhibitions ==
- Today's Pioneers: Two Women Photojournalists in Iraq and Afghanistan, in collaboration with Stephanie Sinclair, Museum of Photographic Arts (MOPA), San Diego, 2006
- Picturing the World, The Ackland Art Museum, Chapel Hill, 2008
- Unseen Iraq, Reel Iraq Festival, Edinburgh, 2009
- Enamored, GuatePhoto Festival, Museo Nacional de Arte Moderno, Guatemala City, Guatemala, 2010
- Conflictzone, National Press Club, Washington, DC, 2011
- Arab Revolutions, Third-Floor Gallery, London, July 28 to September 4, 2011
- WAR/PHOTOGRAPHY: Images of Armed Conflict and Its Aftermath, The Museum of Fine Arts, Houston, November 11 to February 2013
- Women in War, South Korea, 2014
