= Georgia Fort =

American journalist

- Born: Georgia Ellyse Fort
- Education: University of St. Thomas
- Occupation: Journalist
- Awards: Upper Midwest Emmy Awards, Courage in Journalism Award

Georgia Ellyse Fort is an American independent award-winning journalist based in the Minneapolis–Saint Paul area. She has been covering the ongoing protests in that area against Immigration and Customs Enforcement (ICE) raids and the killings of Renee Good and Alex Pretti. Along with Don Lemon, she was arrested by federal agents on January 30, 2026, after reporting on a protest against ICE at Cities Church in St. Paul.

== Background ==
Fort is from St. Paul, Minnesota, and attended high school there. She graduated from the University of St. Thomas in 2010, and then moved to Georgia. Fort was a reporter at WTVM in Columbus, Georgia from 2015 to 2017. She also worked at radio station WFXE at that time. In 2017, Fort worked as a morning news anchor for KBJR in Superior, Wisconsin, which serves the Duluth, Minnesota media market. She returned to St. Paul in 2018 and worked as a freelancer for local outlets such as Unicorn Riot.

She covered the murder of George Floyd in 2020 and the trial of Derek Chauvin, the Minneapolis police officer who was convicted of that killing in 2021. Her newsroom operation is called BLCK Press.

In 2025, Fort won a two-year fellowship from the Bush Foundation "to pursue executive education and continue building a journalism ecosystem that affirms community, develops talent and ensures that all voices are seen and heard." As of January 2026, she has over 137,000 people following her on Facebook and also about 70,000 on Instagram. She has been nominated for 12 regional Emmy Awards, winning three of them. In 2026, she was awarded a Courage in Journalism Award by the International Women’s Media Foundation.

She is vice president of the Minnesota chapter of the National Association of Black Journalists.

== Coverage of church protest and arrest ==
Protesters entered Cities Church in St. Paul on January 18, 2026 during a worship service. Their target was pastor David Easterwood, who also heads the local ICE field office. Along with Don Lemon, Fort attended and livestreamed coverage of the protest. Several dozen protesters entered the church and chanted loudly, calling for an end to ICE raids and remembering Renee Good. The church is affiliated with the Southern Baptist Convention. Trump administration Justice Department official Harmeet Dhillon soon announced that she was investigating everyone involved with the protest.

A Minnesota grand jury indicted Fort, Lemon and seven protestors on January 29 on charges of conspiracy and interfering with the First Amendment rights of worshippers. The indictment was signed by several political appointees to the U.S. Department of Justice, including Attorney General Pam Bondi and Assistant Attorney General of the Civil Rights Division Harmeet Dhillon.

Fort was arrested at her home in the early morning hours of January 30. She live-streamed her impending arrest until she was taken into custody. After both pleaded not guilty to the charges, Fort was released on personal recognizance bond later on the same day, with Lemon being released without bond hours later.

Fort's attorney is Leita Walker of Ballard Spahr. Walker said: "Fort was present at the demonstration solely in a journalistic capacity, documenting an event of significant public interest and concern. The free speech and free press guarantees of the First Amendment fully protect such newsgathering and reporting activities, and Fort's arrest is a transparent and unconstitutional attempt by our federal government to intimidate journalists and chill their protected speech."

== Responses ==
The National Association of Black Journalists issued a statement saying: "The First Amendment is not optional and journalism is NOT a crime. A government that responds to scrutiny by targeting the messenger is not protecting the public, it is attempting to intimidate it, and considering recent incidents regarding federal agents, it is attempting to distract it." Their statement was endorsed by dozens of other civil liberties and journalist organizations.

Former Vice President Kamala Harris denounced the arrests of Lemon and Fort, saying: "Donald Trump continues to consolidate power and show a flagrant disregard for the rule of law. This arrest is another affront to our rights and freedoms and should alarm and enrage us."

Following Fort and Lemon's arrests, Democratic US Representative Alexandria Ocasio-Cortez said that Pam Bondi should be impeached for the arrest of journalists, as well as her poor handling of the Epstein files and efforts to force Minnesota to give its voter data to the Trump administration.

The Columbia Journalism Review's Riddhi Setty wrote on February 3 that "the arrests of Georgia Fort, an Emmy-winning journalist who runs her own media outlet, and Don Lemon, the former CNN anchor who now hosts his own YouTube show, made clear the risks involved in documenting the news—especially for those reporting independently."

== Recognition ==
- Winner, 2024 Upper Midwest Emmy Award, Diversity/Equity/Inclusion — Long Form Content for Here's the Truth
- Nominee, 2024 Upper Midwest Emmy Award, News Feature — Light Feature
- Nominee, 2024 Upper Midwest Emmy Award, Diversity/Equity/Inclusion — News
- Nominee, 2024 Upper Midwest Emmy Award, Environment/Science — Short or Long Form Content
- Nominee, 2024 Upper Midwest Emmy Award, Diversity/Equity/Inclusion — Short Form Content
- Nominee, 2024 Upper Midwest Emmy Award, Public Service Announcement
- Winner, 2023 Upper Midwest Emmy Award, Diversity/Equity/Inclusion — Long Form Content for Here's the Truth
- Winner, 2023 Upper Midwest Emmy Award, Diversity/Equity/Inclusion — Short Form Content, for "Black Men Teach"
- Nominee, 2023 Upper Midwest Emmy Award, Diversity/Equity/Inclusion — Short Form Content, for "Black Doulas Matter" and "Development for All"
- Nominee, 2023 Upper Midwest Emmy Award, Serious News Feature
- Nominee, 2023 Upper Midwest Emmy Award, Talent — Program Host/Moderator
- 2026, Courage in Journalism Award, International Women’s Media Foundation
