= Catherine Gicheru =

Catherine Gicheru is a Kenyan journalist and editor. She was the founding editor-in-chief of The Star. She received the Courage in Journalism Award in 1992.

== Career ==
Gicheru worked at The Nation. She later served as news editor and investigations editor at Nation Media Group. Gicheru became the founding editor-in-chief of The Star in 2017.

The Index on Censorship published a profile of Gicheru. It covered her concerns about biometric data and the protection of journalistic sources in Kenya. Gicheru became project director of the Africa Women Journalism Project. The project was launched in 2020. It supported women journalists in several African countries.

== Awards ==
Gicheru received the International Women's Media Foundation's Courage in Journalism Award in 1992. She was a Nieman Fellow at Harvard University.
