= Arijana Saračević Helać =

Bosnian journalist (born 1964)

- Born: 1964 (age 61–62); Jajce, Socialist Republic of Bosnia and Herzegovina, Yugoslavia
- Citizenship: Yugoslavia (until 1992); Bosnia and Herzegovina (from 1992)
- Education: University of Sarajevo
- Occupations: Journalist; Filmmaker
- Awards: Courage in Journalism Award (1993)

Arijana Saračević Helać (born 1964) is a Bosnian journalist and documentary filmmaker known for her work with Radio and Television of Bosnia and Herzegovina. For her journalism during the Bosnian War, Saračević Helać received the International Women's Media Foundation's Courage in Journalism Award, alongside Mirsada Šakić Hatibović.

== Biography ==
Saračević Helać was born in Jajce in what was then the Socialist Republic of Bosnia and Herzegovina, Yugoslavia. She studied journalism at the Faculty of Political Sciences in Sarajevo at the University of Sarajevo. In 1987, she started working for Radio and Television of Bosnia and Herzegovina.

In 1993, Saračević Helać was named as one of the laureates of the International Women's Media Foundation's Courage in Journalism Award for her reporting from Sarajevo during the Bosnian War, including from the streets, the front line, hospitals, and the sites of various attacks; she filed over 2000 reports during the course of the war. She won alongside fellow Bosnian journalist Mirsada Šakić Hatibović.

Following the end of the conflict, Saračević Helać went on to report on the Kosovo War. She also supported UNESCO to assistant independent television stations in Bosnia and Herzegovina.

Saračević Helać began working for the documentary service of Federalna televizija, a television channel operated by Radio-Television of the Federation of Bosnia and Herzegovina. Documentaries she produced included Politička ubojstva (lit. 'political murders'); Djeca rata (lit. 'children of war'), about the Bosnian politician and businessman Fikret Abdić; and films about the history of Bosnia and Herzegovina, including about Josip Broz Tito, Branko Mikulić, Emerik Blum, the Dayton Agreement, the League of Communists of Yugoslavia, Nijaz Duraković and Alija Isaković.

Saračević Helać produced the documentary Znam šta je ofsajd (lit. 'I know what offside is') alongside the Independent Association of Journalists of Vojvodina and the Association of Bosnia and Herzegovina Journalists. The film became one of the most-watched documentaries in Bosnia and Herzegovina. Saračević Helać also produced the film Bosna (lit. 'Bosnia') about the first European basketball championship held in Bosnia and Herzegovina, which was screened at three international film festivals.

Saračević Helać's film Pucajte, ja i sad držim čas (lit. 'shoot, I'm still holding the class') was screened at the Sarajevo Film Festival in 2024 and was nominated for the Gordana Suša Award.
