= Iryna Khalip =

Belarusian journalist

- Born: November 12, 1967 (age 58); Minsk, Belorussian SSR, Soviet Union
- Education: Belarusian State University
- Occupations: Journalist, Reporter, Editor
- Spouse: Andrei Sannikov
- Writing career
- Period: 1994-2010 (incarcerated)
- Notable awards: 2005 TIME Hero of Europe; 2009 Courage in Journalism Award

Iryna Uladzimirawna Khalip (Belarusian: Iрына Уладзіміраўна Халiп, Russian: Ирина Владимировна Халип, romanized: Irina Vladimirovna Khalip; born November 12, 1967) is a Belarusian journalist, reporter and editor in the Minsk bureau of Novaya Gazeta, known for her criticism of Belarusian President Alexander Lukashenko.

For her journalistic activities she has been regularly harassed, detained, and beaten by the Belarusian KGB and authorities. In May 2011, she was given a two-year suspended prison sentence for her role in protests following the 2010 Belarus election.

TIME selected her for the 2005 special issue "European Heroes", category "Brave Hearts". In 2009 she was awarded the Courage in Journalism Award from the International Women's Media Foundation. She is married to former Belarus presidential candidate Andrei Sannikov, an opposition activist and recipient of the 2005 Bruno Kreisky Award.

== Early life, education ==
Iryna Khalip was born on November 12, 1967, in Minsk, a city in Belorussian SSR. Her father is an arts and theater critic. She graduated from Belarus State University with a focus in journalism studies in 1989.

== Early journalism career ==
Afterward graduation Khalip got a job at the government paper Sovetskaya Belorussiya. She decided she wanted to become a full-time journalist in 1994, at age 26. She has stated "I was looking for something not very difficult...something easy and interesting. I was only half right, because journalism is really interesting, but not easy."

Belarus, which had gained independence from the USSR after the dissolution of the Soviet Union in 1991, elected Alexander Lukashenko as president in 1994. He quickly became known for restricting freedom of speech and freedom of the press. Khalip has stated "Dictatorships don’t like journalists - they either destroy them or buy them out." That year, Lukashenko fired the editor of Soviet Belarusia after the employees proposed privatizing the paper, and also demanded the paper become his "mouthpiece." Khalip quit her job and became a correspondent with other papers.

In 1997, Khalip was reporting at a rally that opposed Belarus unifying with Russia. She was clubbed by riot police and dragged by her hair, and her father, who was with her at the rally, was beaten into unconsciousness.

=== Imya intimidation attempt ===
Khalip later went to work for the independent newspaper Imya ("Name"). In 1999, the Belarusian government issued a warning to Imya over an article Khalip had written about the Central Electoral Committee's activities. According to the chair of the Belarusian Press Committee, the article and the newspaper's coverage of the upcoming presidential elections amounted to "incitement to overthrow the state," and a second warning would lead to the paper's closure.

That year, police came to Khalip's home and detained her for an entire day. They interrogated and allegedly threatened her, and while she was detained, they searched her apartment, confiscated travel documents, and took her work computer.

=== 2000 detainment ===
In March 2000, Khalip was reporting on a Minsk demonstration protesting an official ban on a public march. The banned march was intended to be part of the opposition festivities commemorating the 1918 founding of the Belarusian Democratic Republic. She was forced into a police vehicle and detained at an Interior Ministry facility in Minsk, along with 34 other journalists. She was released later that day.

=== Belorusskaya Delovaya Gazeta ===
In 2003, President Lukashenko altered the Belarusian criminal code to make it illegal for journalists to write anything negative about the president. At that point, Khalip had written multiple articles on corruption in the prosecutor's office for Belorusskaya Delovaya Gazeta (Belarusian Business Newspaper). The newspaper was accordingly forced to suspend its activities for "insulting the honor and dignity of the president." In 2006, the newspaper was forced to close permanently.

== Novaya Gazeta ==
After the closure of the Belorusskaya Delovaya Gazeta Khalip became a regular editor and reporter for the Minsk bureau of Novaya Gazeta (New Gazette), a newspaper based in Moscow. The paper is famous for being the very last independent newspaper in Russia. There are no independent newspapers in Belarus, making it one of the few outlets for independent Belarusian journalists.

The paper is known for being outspoken about the corruption of governments in the former Soviet Republics, and its journalists have faced brutal intimidation and persecution. Anna Politkovskaya, one of their well-known reporters and a winner of the 2002 Courage in Journalism Award, was shot to death outside her flat in 2006. Three years before that, the Gazeta investigative journalist Yuri Shchekochikhin died in highly suspicious circumstances; many factions believe he was poisoned by the KGB. Khalip, however, has stated she won't stop reporting on civil and human rights abuses, because “[It would] betray my friends. [It would] betray the memory of their husbands. There is only one way to go ahead.”

=== Reporting on Emmanuel Zeltser ===
Khalip’s more notable reporting is related to abduction, detention and torture of Emmanuel Zeltser, a prominent American lawyer who spent 16 months in the Belarusian KGB detention before being released thanks to the intervention of the United States government and human rights organizations, including Amnesty International. As was widely reported, on March 11, 2008, Zeltser and his assistant Vladlena Funk were abducted in London U.K. by the Belarusian KGB operatives. Both were drugged and secretly renditioned across international borders to Belarus aboard a private jet belonging to Boris Berezovsky, a notorious Russian “oligarch”, wanted by the Interpol for fraud and money laundering and close friend of the Belarusian dictator Alyaksander Lukashenka.

Khalip sent a text of her journalistic investigation to the Novaya Gazeta editorial office on Saturday, November 22, 2009. That day at 17:43 she received an email from "Drug Drug" titled "Greetings from Boris." It read "Irka if you won’t remove the article you will meet with [murdered reporter] Anna Politkovskaya, or tomorrow you will meet with intoxicated niggers. With love, BA (sic)." Khalip immediately called London and spoke to Berezovsky, who assured her he had not sent the email and theorized it was the "special services."

The next Monday and Tuesday she gathered more information for the article at the behest of her editor-in-chief. That Tuesday, at 8:53 p.m., she received a call to her mobile phone from a pay phone. An unknown man stated “You have been warned, bitch, haven’t you? If the article is published, you must not leave your house any more.”

On the evening of Thursday, November 26, she received a telegram from Moscow stating “HERO OF EUROPE THE MATTER DOES NOT CONCERN PAL PALYCH BUT VLADIMIROVICH DRINK HENNESSEY AND DRINK HEALTH OF YOUR SON IF YOU DO NOT CARE FOR YOUR HEALTH." The telegram made obvious references to her private phone conversations the last few days. Days earlier, she had discussed Russian official Pavel Pavlovich Borodin (Pal Palych) with her editors at Novаya Gazeta, informing them that Emmanuel Zeltser was the New York attorney for Borodin. She had also requested her husband, future presidential candidate Andrei Sannikov, pick up Hennessy cognac at a shop. Also, the couple's year-old son had been ill, and she had made several phone calls concerning the issue.

When the Charter 97 website later asked about the source of the threats, Khalip stated “Only those who have a possibility to intercept emails of others could make threats to me. In our country it’s a prerogative of secret services...KGB servicemen are used to stay nameless and faceless in the crowd. They do not like when their illegal and sometimes criminal actions become known…”

Despite the explicit death threats, Khalip and her editors decided to publish the story in the December 9 edition of Novaya Gazeta. The harassment was addressed in the article.

== 'Hunter's Case' interrogation ==
On March 3, 2010, it was reported by Charter97.org that Khalip and her husband Andrei Sannikov had been summoned to the Partyzanski District militia department in Minsk for questioning. Chief interrogating officer Alyaksandr Paznyak oversaw the interrogations, questioning them individually in an effort to uncover if they were connected to a criminal case involving "defamation" of Ivan Korzh, a former member of the KGB in the Gomel region. According to Khalip, they were asked "if we were coordinators of the website charter97.org, if we conducted journalistic investigation of the 'hunters’ case,' if I published anything relating to this issue, if we met with his family, if we published anything on the website 'Belorusski Partizan.' Our answers to all questions were decisive “no”, which is absolutely true.”

== 2010 presidential elections ==
In March 2010, Khalip's husband Andrei Sannikov declared his intention to take part in the Belarus presidential election of 2010 as a candidate. Along with Uladzimir Niaklajeu and Jarasłaŭ Ramančuk, he was considered one of the main opposition candidates. With Khalip's support, he officially registered on November 18, 2010. After the presidential elections took place on December 19, 2010, incumbent Aleksandr Lukashenko was proclaimed the winner with roughly 80% of the popular vote.

=== December 19 demonstration ===
On the night of December 19, thousands of protesters peacefully filled a large square in central Minsk, deeming the election results fraudulent. Many oppositional political candidates were present. The police broke up the rally, beating and injuring people and arresting more than 600. Khalip and her husband Andrei Sannikov were among those beaten by police during the rally, and according to eye-witnesses, were singled out from the crowd. An officer of the secret police broke Sannikov's knees with a metal shield. Later, on the way to the hospital to treat Sannikov's broken legs, their car was intercepted while Khalip was giving a telephone interview to the Moscow radio station Ekho Moskvy (Echo of Moscow). Khalip screamed on air that they were being forcibly removed from their car, arrested, and beaten.

On March 22, while accusing her of lying about being beaten, Lukashenko admitted that Khalip's phone had been bugged and was being listened to by the government.

=== Detainment ===
Both Khalip and Sannikov were detained in a KGB facility in Minsk. Hours after the arrest, Khalip borrowed a mobile phone from another detainee and called her mother, asking her to take care of her young son. According to Sannikov's lawyer Pavel Sapelko, he was denied proper medical treatment for his injuries. Sapelko also reported that the couple was officially charged with the crimes of "organizing an unsanctioned gathering and participating in mass disorder" on December 29, after 10 days detention with no charges. If convicted, the result could be up to 15 years in prison.

=== Custody threats ===
On December 25, The Daily Telegraph reported that authorities were threatening to remove Khalip's young son, at the time three years old, from her mother's custody. The child had been placed in the custody of Khalip's 74-year-old mother after his parents' incarceration. The child at the time believed his parents were on an extended business trip. Child Welfare Services required Khalip's mother to undergo a series of medical and psychological tests to assess if she would be able to retain custody, including testing for H.I.V. and syphilis, saying they would make a decision by the end of the month. Khalip's mother stated “This is an effort to put pressure on Irina. They are capable of squeezing her, and this of course is the most sensitive place.”

After the announcement, activists rallied for Khalip and her son outside the Belarus Embassy in Moscow, holding signs demanding their reunion. Boris Nemtsov was present, holding a sign of Khalip with the others.

By January 11, Khalip's mother reported that the authorities found her fit enough to retain custody of the boy, though he was required to undergo a medical check as well.

=== House arrest ===
After the protests, Khalip was released from the detention center on January 30, and placed under stringent house arrest. Her husband remained incarcerated. Though reunited with her son, she was expressly forbidden from communicating with the outside world or media in any way, and was not allowed to use a phone or a computer, or to go near windows. She was not allowed to receive any correspondence, though she was allowed to talk with family members. Two KGB guards were permanently stationed in her apartment to ensure compliance; if attempted communication, she would be sent back to prison.

=== Legal prosecution ===
On February 3, 2011, it was announced that her husband's press secretary, journalist Aleksandr Otroschenkov, had been sentenced to a four-year prison term for participating in the protest rally. The judgement was handed down by Judge Tatiana Cherkas under article 293 of the Criminal code, despite the fact that Otroschenkov had been involved in the protest solely as a professional journalist.

On February 4, it was reported that Khalip's lawyer Tamara Harayeva had withdrawn from her defense team, giving no explanation. Three days later, Khalip's lawyer Uladzimer Toustsik abruptly withdrew from the case as well. A family member in touch with Khalip said that the authorities had threatened to revoke their licenses to practice law if they continued to represent her. It was also reported that authorities were trying to force her to accept a state-appointed lawyer. On February 18, it was revealed that both of Khalip's former lawyers had been stripped of their licenses to practice law. The Belarusian Justice Ministry stated they had been disbarred for their "refusal to represent Khalip".

As of February 20, 46 people had been charged in the "riot" case, among them four of the nine presidential candidates. Further protests took place after activist Vasuk Parfyankow was sentenced to four years in a high-security prison. Sixteen journalists and activists including Khalip still faced prosecution, all facing the possibility of 15 years in prison if their cases proceed to trial.

April appeal

On April 15, Minsk city Court heard an appeal from Andrei Sannikov's lawyer Pavel Sapelka against the extent of his detention term, but was denied. According to Radio Svaboda (Radio Freedom), Sannikov's health after his last meeting with his lawyers was "satisfactory". He is to be tried on April 27.

On April 18, the Minsk City Court officially sent a case against Khalip to the court of the Zavadski district of Minsk, stating "The case has just been received by the court. A date and a judge have not been appointed." Iryna Khalip, Syargei Martseleu and Pavel Sevyarynets are to be charged under part 1 of article 342 of the Criminal Code of Belarus for “taking part or organizing the actions that violate public order.” That day Minsk City Court also extended Khalip's house arrest for another month.

Amnesty International designated Khalip and her husband as prisoners of conscience. The Committee to Protect Journalists has also called for Belarusian authorities to immediately lift all restrictions on Khalip's movement and to drop the "fabricated" charges against her.

On 16 May, 2011, Khalip was convicted of "organizing and preparing activities severely disruptive of public order" and given a suspended sentence of two years' imprisonment.

In July 2013 Khalip was exempted from criminal charges.

== Awards and recognition ==
Time magazine selected her for the 2005 special issue "European Heroes", in the category "Brave Hearts".

In October 2009, Khalip was awarded the Courage in Journalism Award from the International Women's Media Foundation.

In October 2013, Tom Stoppard awarded her the "International writer of courage" of the PEN Pinter Prize, a major international human rights award.

== Personal life ==
Khalip is currently married to Andrei Sannikov, and has a son.

== See also ==
- 2010 Belarus election protest crackdown
