= Mabel Rehnfeldt =

Paraguayan reporter (born 1964)

Mabel Rehnfeldt (born 1964) is a Paraguayan reporter and editor for ABC Digital–ABC Color.

Her investigations into corruption and human rights abuses in her country have made her the target of violent threats. In 2004, she received the Courage in Journalism Award from the International Women's Media Foundation.

== Early life and education ==
Mabel Rehnfeldt was born in Villarrica, Paraguay, in 1964.

She first sought out a career in journalism in the early 1980s, studying communications and later working as a press consultant for the Universidad Católica "Nuestra Señora de la Asunción".

== Career ==
When dictator Alfredo Stroessner was overthrown in 1989, Rehnfeldt began working at the independent newspaper ABC Color's weekly magazine Dominical. After becoming an investigative reporter in 1991, in 1994 she was named the head of ABC Color's investigative unit, as well as its website. Decades later, she continues to work as an investigative reporter and editor at ABC Digital–ABC Color, where she is considered one of the publication's most prominent journalists.

At ABC, Rehnfeldt covers human rights abuses and government corruption. She investigated illegal tobacco trafficking as part of the International Consortium of Investigative Journalists' 2007–2008 "Tobacco Underground" project and has also collaborated on other ICIJ projects, including the 2020 FinCEN Files.

For over two decades starting in 1998, Rehnfeldt also hosted a daily radio program on Radio Primero de Marzo. She served as the founding president of the Forum for Paraguayan Journalists (FOPEP), and she teaches journalism at the Universidad Americana in Asunción.

Rehnfeldt has faced significant pushback against her investigations. In 1989, she was attacked by an unknown assailant after investigating police corruption. She has also been the target of personal harassment and blackmail, as well as legal battles and further threats on her life. In 2003, unknown attackers attempted to kidnap her daughter as she returned from school, after Rehnfeldt published investigations into the Paraguayan Catholic Church's handling of sexual abuse.

In 2004, she received the Courage in Journalism Award from the International Women's Media Foundation, becoming the first winner from Paraguay. The following year, she was awarded Columbia University's Maria Moors Cabot Prize.
