= Bina Bektiati =

Indonesian journalist

Bina Bektiati is an Indonesian journalist and author. A writer for Tempo magazine, she helped found the Alliance of Independent Journalists after Tempo was banned in 1994. Briefly exiled from Indonesia, she won the Courage in Journalism Award in 1997. After returning to Indonesia, she is today an editor at Tempo, and a regular contributor to the Jakarta Post.

== Life ==
Bina Bektiati was born and raised in East Java Province. She graduated from the Social and Political Science Department of Airlangga University.

In 1991 Bektiati started writing for Tempo, reporting about politics. In 1994, the Suharto regime banned Tempo, revoking its license and replacing it with a government-controlled publication. Bektiati refused to continue writing, joined other Tempo colleagues in a legal challenge to the government's ban, and helped found the Alliance of Independent Journalists in Indonesia.

Unable to find work, Bektiati left Indonesia for Australia in 1995, writing as a correspondent for a newspaper based in East Java. Returning to Jakarta in 1996, she worked with Tempo colleagues to set up an online version of the magazine. She was among the Indonesian journalists who helped Goenawan Mohamad establish the Institute for the Study of Free Flow of Information (Institut Studi Arus Informasi, ISAI). She then joined Detektif Dan Romantika (D&R), a weekly news magazine, edited by a former Tempo writer. She continued writing on politics, often under a pseudonym, until Suharto's fall in 1998.

In 1997 the International Women's Media Foundation awarded Bektiaki their Courage in Journalism Award, making her the first recipient from Indonesia.

After President Habibie's new government relaxed media censorship, Tempo was re-established and Bektiati resumed writing for it.

In 2015 she co-edited Letters from Foreign Lands, an anthology of personal accounts by diasporic Indonesians.

Bekiati is a member of the Specialty Coffee Association of Indonesia (SCAI). In 2019 she conducted media training around the Indonesian coffee industry with the Institute for Press and Development Studies (Lembaga Studi Pers dan Pembangunan, LSPP).

== Books ==
- Memoar orang-orang Singkawang [People from Singkawang: a memoir]. Jakarta: Galeri Foto Jurnalistik Antara, 2011.
- (ed. with Nugroho Dewanto) Surat dari Rantau [Letters from Foreign Lands]. Kreasi Mitramedia Utama, 2015.
- (ed.) Kita bisa berdaya : pemberdayaan tenaga kerja migran sebagai duta bangsa dengan misi memperkenalkan kebaikan dan kelebihan Indonesia dimana-mana [We can be empowered: empowering migrant workers as ambassadors of the nation with a mission to introduce the goodness and advantages of Indonesia everywhere] by Indah Morgan. Jakarta: PT. Merah Putih Sejahtera, 2016. ISBN 9786026028204
