= Sumi Khan =

Bangladeshi investigative journalist (born 1969)

- Born: June 1970 (age 55)
- Occupation: Journalist
- Years active: 2000–present
- Awards: Courage in Journalism Award (2005)

Sumi Khan (born June 1969) is a Bangladeshi investigative journalist known for her reporting on radical extremism, minority persecution, and political affairs in Bangladesh. In 2005, she received the Courage in Journalism Award from the International Women’s Media Foundation. Khan is currently in exile in the United States.

== Early life ==
Khan was born in June 1970 in Bangladesh. Her father was a member of the Mukti Bahini who was tortured to death by Al-Badr, an auxiliary force of the Pakistan Army during the Bangladesh Liberation War. Her mother was an activist.

== Career ==
Khan started her journalism career in 1993. She joined the Daily Jugantor in 1999. She was fired from the newspaper after reporting on a well connected oil executive raping his maid. After that she joined the Shaptahik 2000 (Weekly 2000). In 2002, she was detained by Bangladesh Police and questioned on her reporting of religious extremism.

In April 2004, Khan was attacked in Chittagong by three men leaving her with stab wounds over her articles on ties between politicians and attacks by religious extremists on minorities. That year the Committee to Protect Journalists called Bangladesh the most dangerous Asian country for journalists. She interviewed Syed Haider Farooq Maududi, son of Jamaat-e-Islami founder Abul A'la Maududi, and Marina Mahathir, a Malaysian activist to under Islamist ideologies in Asia. In 2005, Khan was awarded the Courage in Journalism Award by the International Women’s Media Foundation. Khan won The Guardian Foundation's Hugo Young award.

Khan was serving as the Women’s Affairs Secretary of the Dhaka Union of Journalists when the Sheikh Hasina government fell on 5 August 2024. She was forced into exile in February 2025 due to increasing threats from radical Islamist groups. Previously, she had also faced intimidation from the Bangladesh Jamaat-e-Islami, which she alleges has significant influence over the Muhammad Yunus led interim government and media in Bangladesh. She has criticized arrest of journalists Shyamal Dutta and Mozammel Haque Babu, as well as the revocation of press accreditations for over 160 journalists by the new regime. She alleges that the government has empowered the Bangladesh Jamaat-e-Islami to take control of the media in Bangladesh.
