= Linda Deutsch =

American journalist (1943–2024)

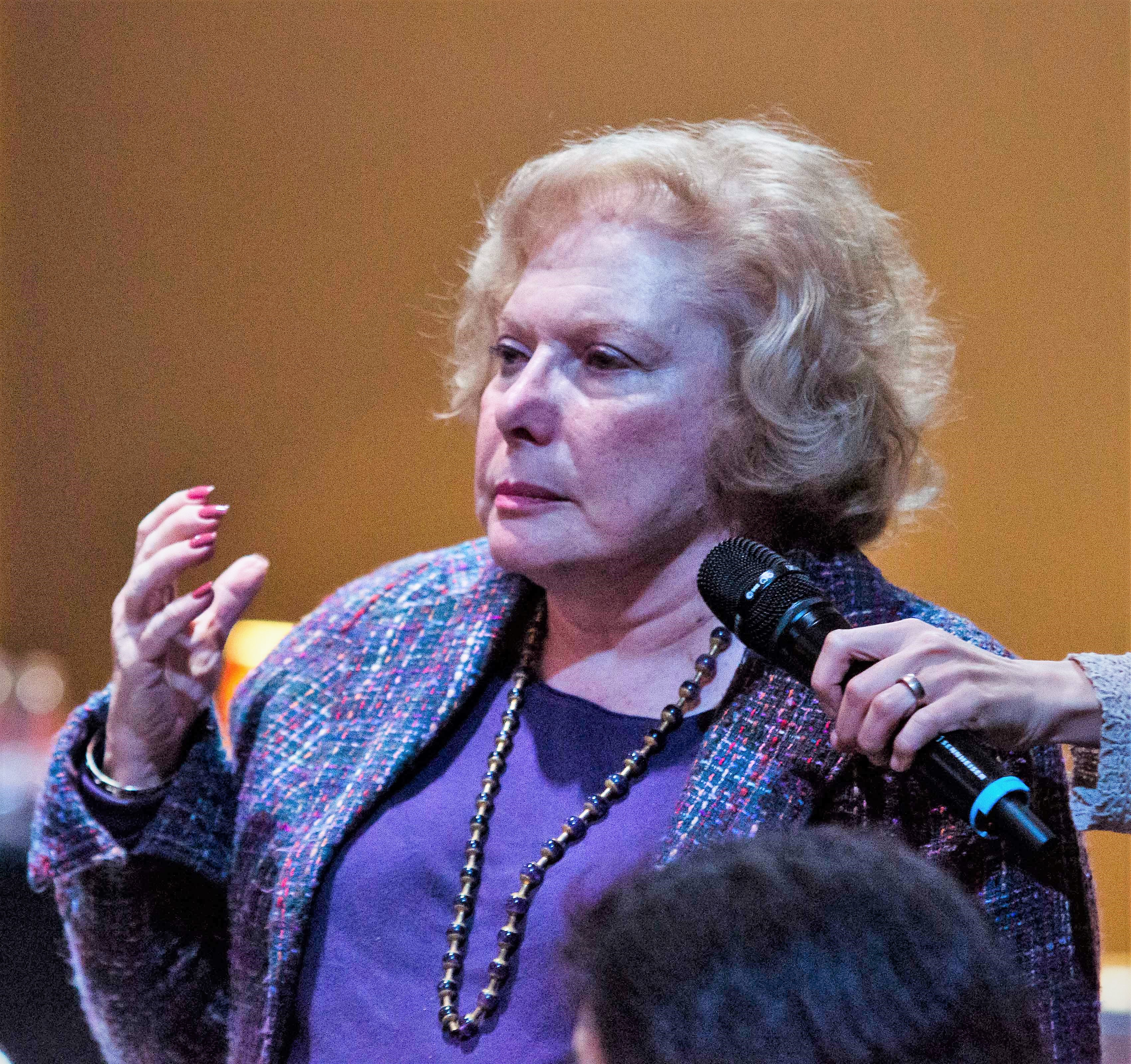
- Deutsch in 2013
- Born: September 24, 1943; Perth Amboy, New Jersey, U.S.
- Died: September 1, 2024 (aged 80); Los Angeles, California, U.S.
- Education: Monmouth University
- Occupation: Journalist
- Writing career
- Years active: 1967–2014

Linda Deutsch (September 24, 1943 – September 1, 2024) was an American journalist who worked for the Associated Press (AP) and covered court cases from 1967 until her retirement in 2014, including the high-profile trials of Charles Manson, Sirhan Sirhan, O. J. Simpson, and Michael Jackson.

== Early life and education ==
Deutsch was born on September 24, 1943, in Perth Amboy, New Jersey, and was raised in the Jersey Shore community of Bradley Beach. She became interested in journalism at age 12, when she founded a newsletter for an Elvis Presley fan club. She graduated from Asbury Park High School and in 1965 from Monmouth University, where she earned a bachelor's degree in English. She was encouraged to become a journalist by her uncle, a newspaper editor, despite journalism's severe lack of gender diversity at the time.

== Career ==
While in college, Deutsch interned for a summer at the Perth Amboy Evening News. That summer, aged 20, she covered the 1963 civil rights march on Washington and heard Martin Luther King give his "I Have a Dream" speech. Her report on the event was her first front-page byline. After graduating, she moved to Southern California and joined The San Bernardino Sun for a short time.

When Deutsch first joined the Associated Press in January 1967, she was the only woman in the Los Angeles bureau. Speaking on her experience as a woman in journalism, she said in 2015: "I personally was never harassed ... I was very fortunate in that aspect, but I think it was because [her colleagues] saw that I could do the job. You don't harass somebody that's making you look good. And so the only discrimination, really, was in pay and in assignments." Over the course of her career, she rose through the ranks and earned the title of special correspondent in 1992, a designation bestowed on only 18 reporters since the AP was founded in 1846.

Deutsch covered the assassination of Robert F. Kennedy (1968) and the trials of Kennedy's assassin Sirhan Sirhan (1969), cult leader Charles Manson (1970–1971), Angela Davis (1971–1972), activist Daniel Ellsberg (1973), bank robber Patty Hearst (1976), the Exxon Valdez oil spill (1989), acquitted double murderer O. J. Simpson (1995), murderer Phil Spector (2009), singer Michael Jackson, actor Robert Blake, serial killer Richard Ramirez, and parricidal brothers Lyle and Erik Menendez. She became a Pulitzer Prize finalist for her role as a pool reporter at Simpson's trial. The trial also marked her first time acting as a television journalist; her reporting was widely broadcast due to the Associated Press's neutral reputation.

In 1975, Deutsch was sent to Guam, where she interviewed evacuees from Vietnam following the Fall of Saigon. In 1992 she reported on the Rodney King riots. In 1997, she promoted the late Theo Wilson's memoir Headline Justice: Inside the Courtroom – The Country's Most Controversial Trials on a book tour and at her own expense.

Deutsch retired in 2014. She returned temporarily in 2019 to follow up with Simpson about his life after imprisonment for a 2007 armed robbery in Nevada. That year, she also endowed journalism scholarships at her alma mater Monmouth University for $1 million.

== Personal life and death ==
Deutsch never married nor had children. She said of her life in 2015: "I have a godson who means the world to me. And I have a very full life, but it never included marriage. I think my relationships mostly broke up because of my work."

Deutsch was diagnosed with pancreatic cancer in 2022. After a round of successful treatment, it reappeared mid-2024. She died at home in Los Angeles, on September 1, 2024, at the age of 80, surrounded by family and friends.

== Honors and awards ==
- University of Missouri's Honor Medal for Distinguished Service in Journalism, 1992
- Monmouth University Distinguished Alumni Award, 1996
- Society of Professional Journalists "Fellow of the Society", the organization's highest honor awarded for contributions to the journalism profession, 2005
- Lifetime Achievement Award from the International Women's Media Foundation, 2015
- Lifetime Achievement Award from the Washington Press Club Foundation, which she received at the Congressional Dinner on February 25, 2016
