= Florica Ichim =

Romanian theatre critic (1938–2022)

- Born: 27 November 1938; Bucharest, Kingdom of Romania
- Died: 27 February 2022 (aged 83)
- Education: I. L. Caragiale Institute of Film and Theatre Arts
- Occupation: Theatre critic
- Years active: 1970–2022
- Employer: România Liberă (1970–1996) Teatrul azi (1997–2022)

Florica Ichim (27 November 1938 – 27 February 2022) was a Romanian theatre critic known for her work on documenting and archiving Romanian theatrical history.

== Early life and education ==
Ichim was born in Bucharest. As a child, her father was a political prisoner, which prevented her from accessing many educational and employment opportunities. However, she was able to ultimately study philology at the I. L. Caragiale Institute of Film and Theatre Arts, graduating in 1968.

== Career ==
After graduating, Ichim worked as a journalist for various Romanian magazines, including Contemporanul and România Literară, primarily writing about film and theatre. Between 1970 and 1980, she wrote regularly for Munca. Between 1970 and 1996, Ichim was the chief theatre critic for the daily newspaper România Liberă; she also acted as its film critic between 1970 and 1975, 1980 and 1983, and in 1990.

During the communist era in Romania, Ichim experienced some difficulties to her opposition to the Romanian Communist Party; in 1975, after refusing to join the party, she was temporarily forced to leave România Liberă. Two days after the Romanian revolution, which culminated in the deposition and end execution of the country's communist leader, Nicolae Ceaușescu, Ichim was elected editor of România Liberă by staff, in addition to continuing on in her role as theatre critic. The newspaper's continued critical reporting of the Romanian government after the end of communism in the country led to an increase in readership, though the newspaper was attacked by supporters of the new government, including an incident wherein România Liberă's offices were ransacked, journalists assaulted, and printing presses damaged. Ichim briefly went into hiding following the attack, and eventually stepped down as editor, though continued to work for the paper until 1996. As a result of her editorship, Ichim was awarded the 1990 Courage in Journalism Award by the International Women's Media Foundation.

From 1997, Ichim edited Teatrul azi, a theatre magazine that in addition to reviewing contemporary theatrical productions also contributed to the archiving, documentation and research of the Romanian theatrical scene. Ichim expanded this by establishing the Camil Petrescu Foundation, named in honour of playwright Camil Petrescu, which published dozens of books on Romanian theatre studies, including on prominent cultural figures like Vlad Mugur, George Constantin, Gábor Tompa, Liviu Ciulei, Radu Penciulescu and Alexandru Tocilescu. Ichim chaired the foundation until her death.

== Death ==
Ichim died on 27 February 2022 at the age of 83. She was buried at Cimitirul Străulești 2 in Bucharest. Following her death, tributes were paid to her, including by the Cluj-Napoca National Theatre, who praised her as the "great lady of Romanian theatre" for her support and preservation of Romania's cultural history, and the Hungarian Theatre of Cluj, who described Ichim as a "trusted friend" of Hungarian Romanian theatre.
