= Juliana Dal Piva =

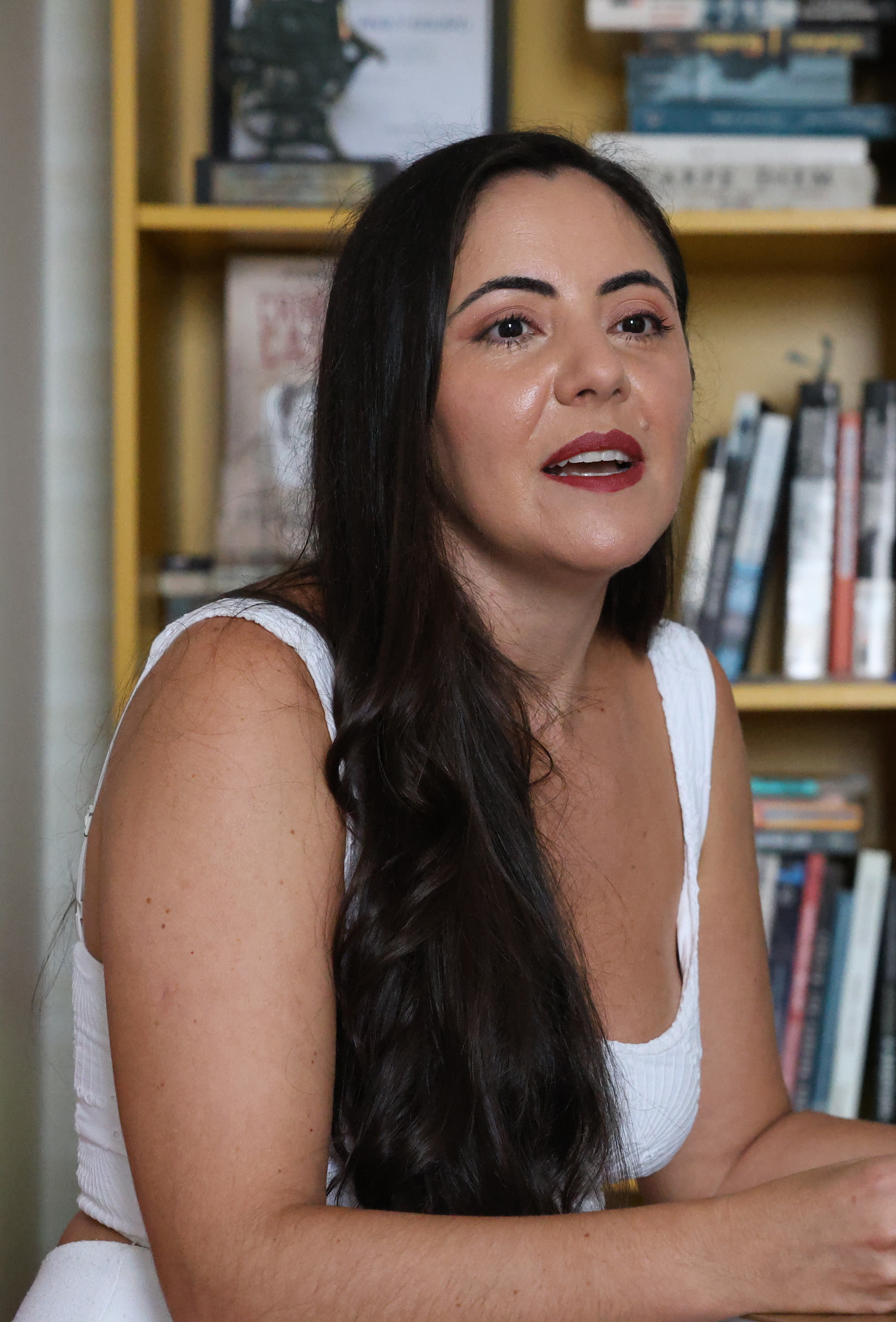
- Dal Piva in 2026
- Born: 1986 (age 39–40)
- Education: Federal University of Santa Catarina; Fundação Getulio Vargas
- Occupations: Investigative journalist, writer
- Employer(s): Latin American Center for Investigative Journalism (CLIP); ICL Notícias
- Notable work: O negócio do Jair: A história proibida do clã Bolsonaro; Crime sem castigo: Como os militares mataram Rubens Paiva
- Awards: Courage in Journalism Award (2025)

Juliana Dal Piva is a Brazilian investigative journalist and writer. She has reported on politics, corruption and human rights in Brazil. She works for the Latin American Center for Investigative Journalism (CLIP) and is a columnist for ICL Notícias. She previously worked for O Globo and UOL.

== Career ==
Dal Piva has worked as an investigative journalist for Brazilian news organisations. Much of her reporting has examined Jair Bolsonaro and members of his family. Her reporting has also led to threats and legal action. The Committee to Protect Journalists reported on a civil case involving Dal Piva and Frederick Wassef, a lawyer for Bolsonaro. The case followed her reporting on alleged corruption involving Bolsonaro and his family. Dal Piva had also published messages sent to her by Wassef.

== Awards ==
Dal Piva won the Prêmio IREE de Jornalismo in 2021 for the Politics category for the podcast series UOL Investiga: A Vida Secreta de Jair. She was also part of the UOL team that won the III Prêmio Cláudio Weber Abramo de Jornalismo de Dados for Anatomia da Rachadinha. The same year, she won the 15th Troféu Mulher Imprensa in the Repórter de Jornal ou Revista (ou texto online) category. The Global Investigative Journalism Network also reported that Dal Piva received the IREE, Cláudio Weber Abramo and Troféu Mulher Imprensa awards in 2021.
