= Anna Babinets =

Ukrainian journalist (born 1984)

- Анна Бабінець
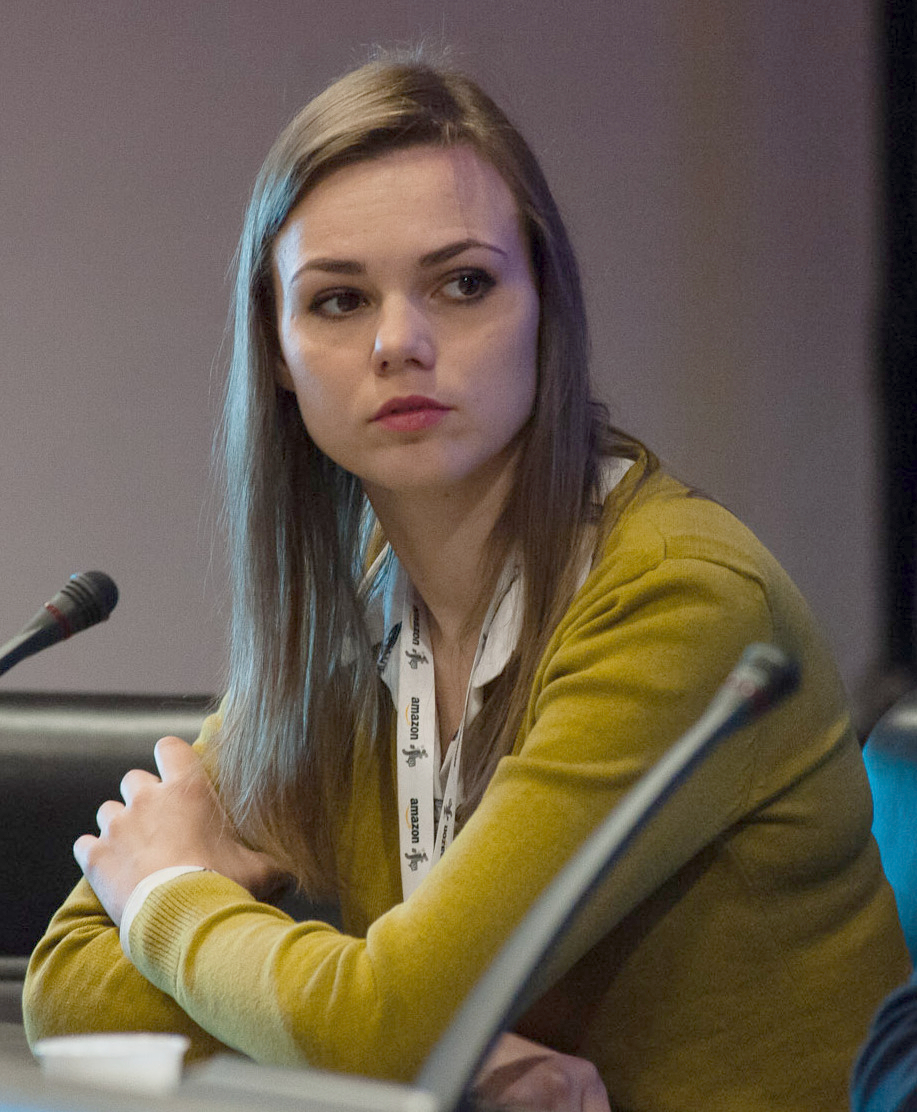
- At the International Journalism Festival in 2017
- Born: 12 June 1984 (age 42); Dnipro, Ukrainian Soviet Socialist Republic
- Education: Oles Honchar Dnipro National University
- Occupation: Journalist
- Awards: Courage in Journalism Award (2019)

Anna Volodymyrivna Babinets (Ukrainian: Анна Володимирівна Бабінець; born 12 June 1984) is a Ukrainian investigative journalist. She is the head of the independent investigative agency Slidstvo.info, a regional editor of the Organized Crime and Corruption Reporting Project, and a member of YanukovychLeaks.

== Biography ==
Babinets was born in Dnipro, Dnipropetrovsk Oblast, in what was then the Ukrainian Soviet Socialist Republic. She studied at Oles Honchar Dnipro National University.

After graduating, Babinets worked for a variety of media outlets, including the magazine The Ukrainian Week, the television show Znak oklyku on TVi, the online outlets Hromadske, Ukrainska Pravda, LB.ua and Dzerkalo Tyzhnia, and the newspaper the Kyiv Post.

In 2012, Babinets co-created with Dmytro Hnap the independent investigative project Slidstvo.info. In February 2014, she co-launched YanukovychLeaks, in which more than 25, 000 documents were published concerning the former President of Ukraine, Viktor Yanukovych, and his entourage. The documents were also shared with the Office of the Attorney General. Babinets herself published multiple reports on Yanukovych's associate, businessman Serhiy Kurchenko, and produced a documentary about YanukovychLeaks entitled Newsroom Mezhyhirya: The Story of Yanukovych Leaks (Ukrainian: Ньюзрум Межигір'я: Історія YanukovychLeaks, romanized: Nyuzrum Mezhihirya: Istoriya YanukovychLeaks).

In 2015, Babinets became the regional editor of the Organised Crime and Corruption Reporting Project.

In 2017, Babinets and Vlad Lavrov were among 300 reporters who collaborated with the International Consortium of Investigative Journalists to report on the Panama Papers that exposed the hidden infrastructure and global scale of offshore tax havens; Babinets and Lavrov contributed 2016 reports on the President of Ukraine Petro Poroshenko's involvement in the scandal. The report received the 2017 Pulitzer Prize for Explanatory Reporting.

In 2017, Babinets, alongside Lavrov, Hnap and Olga Loginova, produced the investigative documentary Killing Pavel (Ukrainian: Вбивство Павла, romanized: Vbystvo Pavla) about the murder of journalist Pavel Sheremet. It was awarded the 2017 Investigative Reporters and Editors Award for Investigative Reporting.

In 2019, Babinets received the International Women's Media Foundation's Courage in Journalism Award for her investigative journalism.
