= Nizhny Tagil State Socio-Pedagogical Institute =

- Нижне-Тагильский государственный социально-педагогический институт
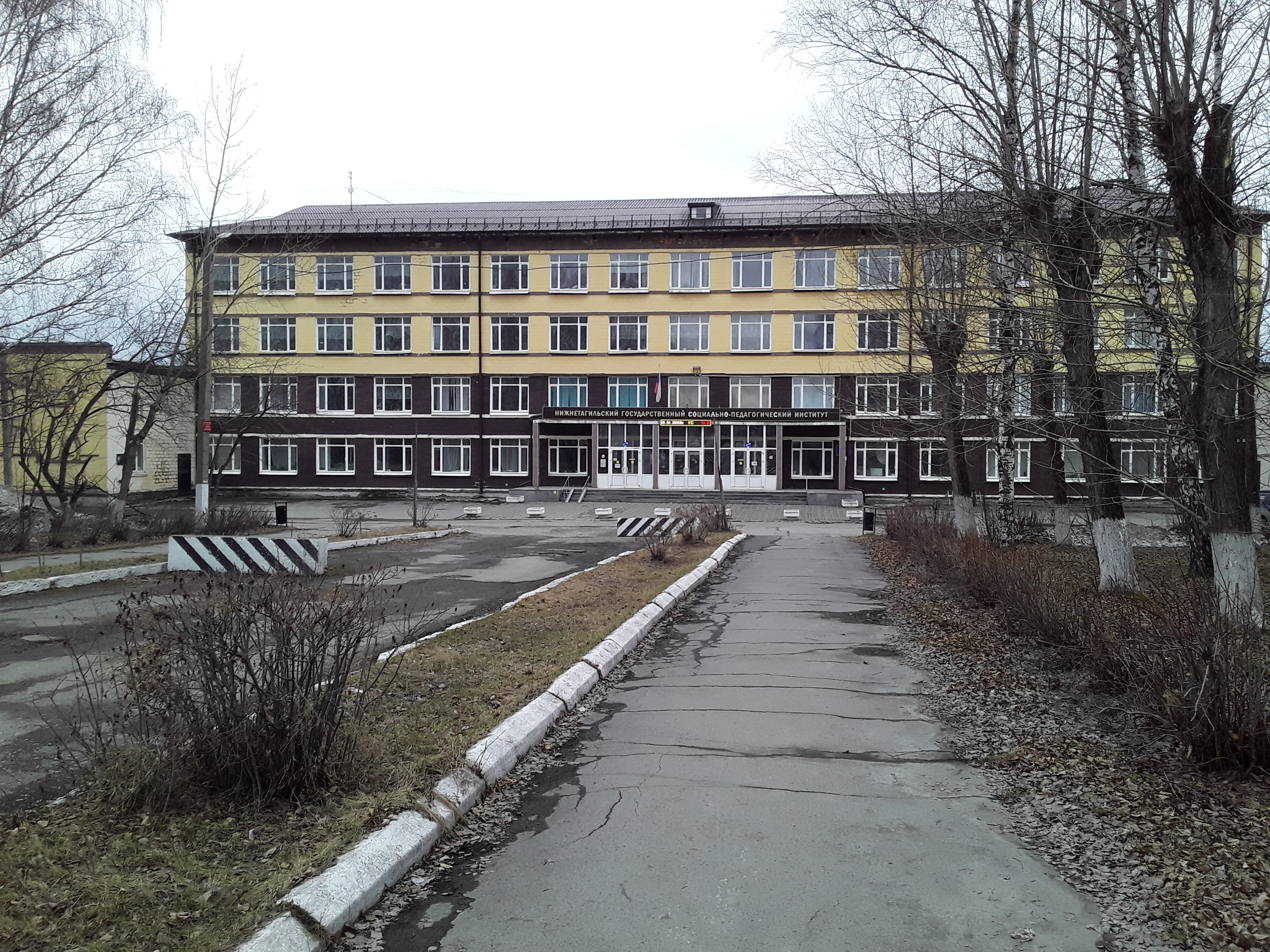
- Established: 1939
- Parent institution: Ural State Pedagogical University
- Location: Nizhny Tagil, Russia; 57°54′46″N 59°58′44″E
- Language: Russian
- Website: https://www.ntspi.ru

Nizhny Tagil State Socio-Pedagogical Institute (Russian: Нижне-Тагильский государственный социально-педагогический институт) is a higher education institution founded on 27 June 1939 to train highly qualified teaching staff. Starting from 2 April 2025, a branch of Ural State Pedagogical University.

== History ==
On 27 June 1939, by the Decree of the Council of People's Commissars of the RSFSR, on the basis of the Nizhny Tagil Pedagogical School, the Nizhny Tagil Teachers' Institute was established with a two-year training period, which is under the jurisdiction of the People's Commissariat of Education of the RSFSR. Three educational departments (faculties) were created in the structure of the institute: historical, philological and physical and mathematical. In 1939, the first one hundred and twenty students were recruited by the institute, and already in 1941, the first graduation of teachers for general education schools in the specializations of the institute took place. From 1941 to 1944, during the Great Patriotic War, the Krivoy Rog Mining Institute and the Ordzhonikidzegrad Machine-Building Institute evacuated from the occupied territories were placed in the classrooms and educational buildings of the Nizhny Tagil Teachers' Institute. From 1941 to 1944, about four hundred teachers graduated from the Institute. Since 1948, evening and correspondence three-year departments were created in the structure of the institute, as well as four educational departments (departments): physical and mathematical, natural geographical, philological and historical. From 1941 to 1952, about 1,760 teachers for secondary schools graduated from the Institute.

On 11 August 1952, by the Decree of the Council of Ministers of the USSR No. 3692 and the order of the USSR Ministry of Higher and Secondary Specialized Education, the Nizhny Tagil Teachers' Institute was reorganized into the Nizhny Tagil State Pedagogical Institute, which became a higher educational institution. M. M. Kozhevnikov was appointed the first rector. The structure of the Institute consisted of two faculties: Physics and Mathematics and Russian Language and Literature and seven general institute departments: Physics, Mathematics, Pedagogy and Psychology, Geography, Natural Science, Fundamentals of Marxism–Leninism, Russian Language and Literature. In 1953, the Faculty of Chemistry and Biology was established, in 1959, the Engineering-Pedagogical and Artistic-Graphic Faculty were established within the structure of the Institute, with a five-year training period. In the same year, four more general institute departments were created: pedagogy, philosophy, foreign languages and physical education. On April 9, 1966, by the decision of the Ministry of Education of the RSFSR, the institute was assigned the second qualification category. Since 1979, the structure of the institute consisted of seven faculties: history, foreign languages, industrial-pedagogical, artistic-graphic, physical-mathematical, chemical-biological and Russian language and literature, as well as twenty-three general institute departments. The teaching staff of the institute included 257 teachers, 2400 people studied in the day department, 1575 people in the correspondence department, 115 people in the preparatory department. In 1988, V. I. Smirnov was elected the new rector. In 1989, the faculty of pre-university training and vocational guidance was established at the institute, and in 1991, the Nizhny Tagil secondary specialized school No. 75 was established as the training base of the institute. personnel in ten specialties.

On 1 August 2003, by order of the Ministry of Education and Science of the Russian Federation No. 3226, the Nizhny Tagil State Pedagogical Institute was renamed the Nizhny Tagil State Social and Pedagogical Academy. Postgraduate and master's programs were created in the academy, the structure of the academy included thirteen faculties and four institutes that trained teachers in thirty-one specialties. The total number of full-time and part-time students was 5880 people. The Academy founded the only specialized periodical scientific and pedagogical "Historical and Pedagogical Journal" in the Russian Federation.

On 28 August 2013, by Order of the Ministry of Education and Science of the Russian Federation No. 1002, the Nizhny Tagil State Socio-Pedagogical Academy was reorganized into the Nizhny Tagil State Socio-Pedagogical Institute by merging with the Russian State Vocational Pedagogical University. The structure of the institute consists of six faculties and nine general institute departments. From 1939 to 2019, the institute graduated about 54179 teaching staff, of which: from 1939 to 1953 - 1571, from 1954 to 2002 - 27606, from 2003 to 2014 - 22546, from 2015 to 2019 - 2456 people.

On 2 April 2025 the institute was reorganized into a branch of Ural State Pedagogical University.

== Management ==
- Bednyakov, Varfolomey Pavlovich (1939—1940)
- Saprykin, Pyotr Galaktionovich (1940)
- Degtyarev, K.K. (1940—1941)
- Savitsky, Parfyon Petrovich (1941—1943)
- Schneerson, Lev Mikhailovich (1943—1944)
- Morgun, Pavel Alekseevich (1944)
- Batin, Mikhail Andrianovich (1944—1948)
- Kozhevnikov, Mikhail Matveevich (1948—1967)
- Vladimirtsev, Vladimir Ivanovich (1968—1988)
- Smirnov, Vladimir Ivanovich (1988—2012)
- Nozdrin, Sergey Aleksandrovich (2012—2014)
- Egorova, Liliya Evgenievna (2015—2020)
- Reichert, Tatyana Nikolaevna (2021—2023)
- Zhuykova, Tatyana Valeryevna (since 2023)

== Structure ==
=== Faculties ===
- Faculty of Psychological and Pedagogical Education
- Faculty of Natural Science, Mathematics and Informatics
- Faculty of Social Sciences and Humanities
- Faculty of Art Education
- Faculty of Sports and Life Safety
- Faculty of Philology and Intercultural Communication

=== Departments ===
- Department of Social Work, Management and Law
- Department of Foreign Languages and Russian Philology
- Department of Psychology and Pedagogy of Preschool and Primary Education
- Department of Pedagogy and Psychology
- Department of Information Technology
- Department of Natural Sciences and Physical and Mathematical Education
- Department of Art Education
- Department of life safety and physical culture

== Literature ==
- Нижнетагильский государственный педагогический институт : 60 лет в отечеств. пед. образовании / В. И. Смирнов и др. - Нижний Тагил : Нижнетагильский гос. пед. ин-т, 1999. — 203 с. — ISBN 5-8299-0001-7
- Нижнетагильский государственный педагогический институт: 60 лет истории / Тагильский рабочий // Неклюдов Е., Нижний Тагил: 1999. — 19 мая

== Sources ==
- "оф.сайт".
- "Учат учить: 80 лет Нижнетагильскому государственному социально-педагогическому институту". Тагильский рабочий.
- "Нижнетагильский педагогический институт: 60 лет". История Нижнего Тагила от основания до наших дней.
- "Учительский институт. История становления". Нижнетагильский городской исторический архив.
