= Laurence Geai =

French photojournalist (born 1984)

- Born: 25 May 1984 (age 42)
- Citizenship: France
- Education: ESCE International Business School
- Occupation: Photojournalist
- Years active: 2014–present
- Employer: Sipa Press
- Awards: Courage in Journalism Award (2023)

Laurence Geai (born 25 May 1984) is a French photojournalist and war correspondent. In 2023, she won the International Women's Media Foundation's Anja Niedringhaus Courage in Photojournalism Award in recognition of her work.

== Biography ==
Geai studied business at ESCE International Business School and worked for a time in the fashion industry before deciding to become a photojournalist in 2013. In March 2013, Geai produced her first report, from Syria.

Since 2014, Geai has worked for Sipa Press, a photo agency based in Paris, where she lives. She has reported on the European migrant crisis in France and elsewhere in Europe, and has also covered conflict zones in Iraq, Syria, the Central African Republic, Israel, Palestine and Ukraine. Geai has collaborated with multiple media outlets, including Le Monde, Le Journal du Dimanche, L'Observatoire International, Le Figaro, Paris Match, The Washington Post and Newsweek. Since 2022, she has been represented by Agence MYOP.

In 2016, Geai exhibited her work on water-sharing conflict in Palestine at the Visa pour l'Image, an international photojournalism festival in Perpignan.

In 2017, Geai received the Polka Magazine Prize in recognition of her photojournalism.

In 2020, she won the Grand Prix of Les femmes s'exposent for her report on the fates of alleged Islamic State members in prison, produced for Le Monde.

In 2021, Geai placed third in World Press Photo's General News photo category for her story on the COVID-19 pandemic in France.

In 2023, Geai received the Anja Niedringhaus Courage in Photojournalism Award from the International Women's Media Foundation.
