= Adriane Ohanesian =

- Born: Saratoga Springs, New York, U.S.
- Occupations: Photojournalist, documentary photographer
- Employer(s): Reuters; Getty Images / Reportage
- Known for: Conflict photography in Darfur, South Sudan, Somalia
- Awards: World Press Photo Award (2016); Anja Niedringhaus Courage in Photojournalism Award (2016)
- Website: adrianeohanesian.com

Adriane Ohanesian is an American photojournalist and documentary photographer based in Nairobi, Kenya. She is widely regarded as one of the few foreign journalists to have gained access to the rebel-controlled areas of Darfur, Sudan, during the ongoing conflict in the Jebel Marra mountains. In 2016, she received both the World Press Photo Award and the Anja Niedringhaus Courage in Photojournalism Award, presented by the International Women's Media Foundation (IWMF), for her work documenting the humanitarian crisis in Darfur.

== Early life and education ==
Ohanesian was born and raised in Saratoga Springs, New York.

== Career ==
=== South Sudan and Reuters (2012–2014) ===
In 2012, Ohanesian began covering news in South Sudan for Reuters, where she worked for approximately two years as a staff photographer. During that period she documented Sudanese refugees in South Sudan, clashes in the Nuba Mountains of South Kordofan, and the dispute over oil resources along the contested border between Sudan and South Sudan. She also attended the Eddie Adams Workshop in 2014, where she received recognition from National Geographic.

In 2014 Ohanesian was also recognized as one of Magnum Photos' top 30 Under 30 photographers.

=== Darfur and the Jebel Marra expedition ===
In early 2015, Ohanesian undertook an expedition to the rebel-controlled Jebel Marra region of Darfur, Sudan — an area that the Sudanese government had closed to journalists, United Nations agencies, and non-governmental organizations. Working alongside Dutch journalist Klaas van Dijken, she spent approximately two weeks in the area, traveling largely on foot and by donkey through ten- to twelve-hour days to navigate routes circumventing government-controlled checkpoints. Her photographs documented civilians hiding in caves to escape aerial bombardment, widespread destruction of villages, and the aftermath of attacks by Sudanese government forces and allied militias known as the Janjaweed.

In 2015 Ohanesian received LensCulture's Emerging Talent Award for her photographs of women soldiers in rebel-controlled territory.

One image from the expedition — showing a seven-year-old who had been severely burned when an aircraft dropped a bomb near his family's home — attracted widespread international attention after winning second prize in the Contemporary Issues singles category at the 2016 World Press Photo contest.

Reflecting on the inaccessibility of the region, Ohanesian has noted that the Sudanese government's policy of denial was a principal reason the conflict remained underreported, stating that authorities were blocking not only journalists but also the United Nations and NGOs from operating in rebel-controlled areas. She described a commitment she made to the people she photographed to do everything within her power to disseminate the images and draw attention to the ongoing violence.

The IWMF award jury noted that Ohanesian "approaches storytelling with remarkable skill and an ability to capture the emotional resonance of difficult moments," and described her courage as encompassing not only physical risk but the emotional fortitude required to bear witness with honesty and dignity.

== Awards and recognition ==
Year	Award / Grant	Awarding body	Reference
2014	Eddie Adams Workshop, National Geographic Award	Eddie Adams Workshop	
2014	Emerging Talent Award	LensCulture	
2014	30 Under 30	Magnum Photos / IdeasTap	
2015	Emerging Photographer	Getty Images / Reportage	
2016	World Press Photo Award, Contemporary Issues (2nd prize singles)	World Press Photo	
2016	Anja Niedringhaus Courage in Photojournalism Award	International Women's Media Foundation	
2017	PDN 30 New and Emerging Photographers	Photo District News	
2017	Joop Swart Masterclass	World Press Photo	
2019	Grant — sexual violence against South Sudanese refugees in Uganda	Pulitzer Center on Crisis Reporting	
