= Nicole Tung =

Hong Kong photojournalist

Nicole Tung (born 1986) is a Hong Kong-born photojournalist. Tung is known for her coverage of conflicts and events, including the Syrian Civil War, the European refugee crisis and the Arab Spring.

Tung studied at New York University, receiving a degree in journalism and history in 2009.

Her work is included in the collection of the Museum of Fine Arts Houston.

Tung is the recipient of the 15th edition of the Carmignac Photojournalism Award.

== Career ==
As of March 2022, Tung is covering the 2022 war in Ukraine.
