= Missy Ryan =

American journalist

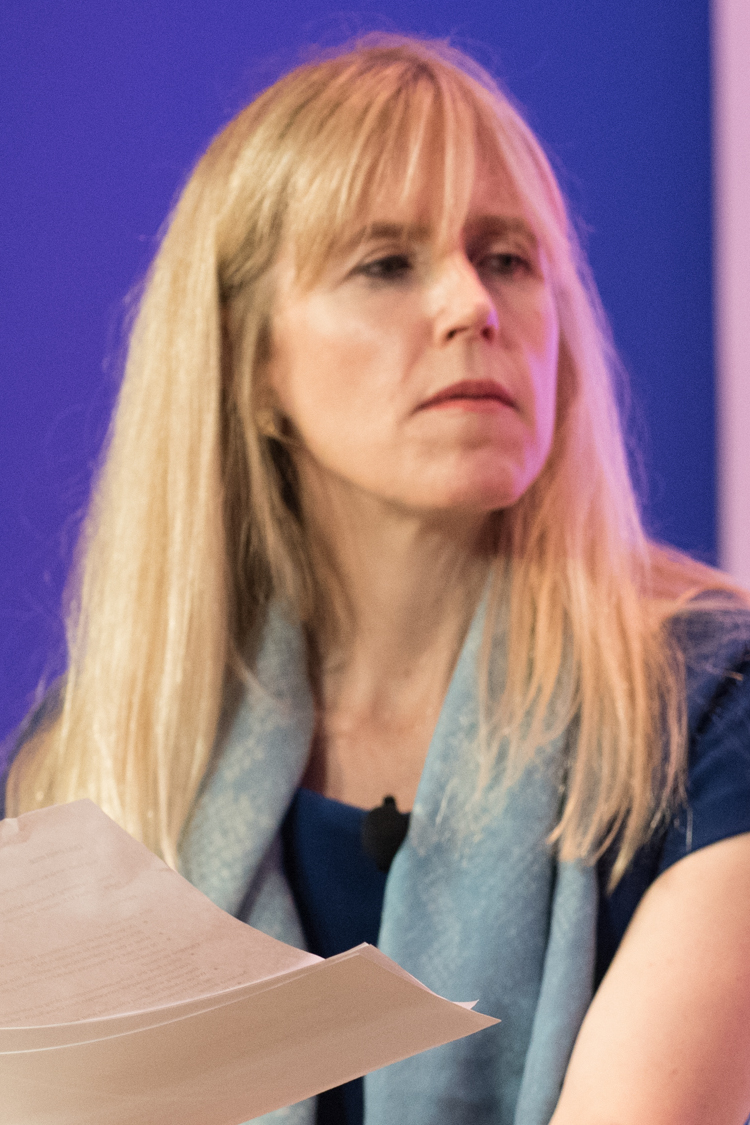
- Ryan in 2018
- Education: Georgetown University (BA); Harvard University (MPP)
- Occupations: Journalist, reporter
- Employer: The Atlantic
- Awards: New York Press Club Award (2012); Courage in Journalism Award (2023)

Missy Ryan is an American journalist focused on national security at The Atlantic. She previously wrote for The Washington Post and Reuters.

== Education ==
Ryan received a B.A. in English Literature from Georgetown University in 1997. She then completed a master's degree at the Harvard Kennedy School in 2005.

== Career ==
Ryan started as a correspondent covering Iraq in 2008 for Reuters News Agency. She was made deputy bureau chief in Baghdad in 2010. Ryan was then posted to Mexico for four months as the acting bureau chief before returning to Washington to serve as Pentagon correspondent.

In 2012, Ryan became a White House fellow and won the New York Press Club award for political reporting in 2012. She became national security and US-Middle East correspondent in 2013. Ryan joined The Washington Post in 2014 to cover the Pentagon.

In 2025, Ryan joined The Atlantic to cover national security.
