= Kizelovskoye Urban Settlement =

Coordinates: 61°6′0.4″N 42°50′30.4″E

Kizelovskoye Urban Settlement (Russian: Ки́зеловское городско́е поселе́ние) is a municipal formation (an urban settlement) within Kizelovsky Municipal District of Perm Krai, Russia, which a part of the territory of the town of krai significance of Kizel is incorporated as. It is the only urban settlement in the municipal district.
