= Maritza Lizeth Gallego Félix =

Mexican American journalist (born 1982)

- Born: 1982 (age 43–44); Magdalena de Kino, Sonora, Mexico
- Education: Northeastern University; Universidad del Noreste
- Occupations: Journalist; Writer
- Years active: 2000–present
- Website: twitter.com/maritzalfelix/

Maritza Lizeth Gallego Félix is a Mexican American journalist, producer and writer based in Arizona. She is the founder and director of Conecta Arizona, a nonprofit Spanish-language news service that connects people in Arizona and Sonora, Mexico, primarily through WhatsApp and social media. She has won five Emmy Awards and Arizona Press Club awards, among other honors.

== Early life and education ==
Félix was born in Magdalena de Kino, Sonora, Mexico. She grew up near the U.S.–Mexico border, regularly crossing between the two countries. She has completed the Media Transformation Challenge at the Poynter Institute and the Sulzberger Executive Leadership Program at Columbia University, and is a senior John S. Knight Journalism Fellow at Stanford University. Félix became a United States citizen in 2025.

== Career ==
Félix's first professional job was at a radio station, after an internship at Televisa in Mexico. She has worked as a journalist since 2004, first in Mexico before moving to the United States.

In 2009, Félix moved to Phoenix, Arizona, where she reported for Prensa Hispana (now Prensa Arizona). She has also written a weekly column for Prensa Arizona, the state's largest Spanish-language newspaper.

In 2014, she joined Telemundo Arizona as a journalist, writer and producer; during three years there, she won five Emmy Awards.

Her work has appeared in outlets including Organización Editorial Mexicana, Telemax, Uniradio Noticias, and Proyecto Puente, and she has produced content for Slate, The Nation, Yes! Magazine and The Hechinger Report.

Her work has been broadcast on Univision and Telemundo. The radio station La Onda 1190 AM has been a media partner of her news service Conecta Arizona. Since 2018 she has worked as a full-time freelance journalist.

Félix founded Conecta Arizona in May 2020, at the start of the COVID-19 pandemic, after she began sharing fact-checked information about the virus in a family WhatsApp group. She chose WhatsApp in part because text messaging was costly for audience members on the Mexican side of the border. The original group, which began with fewer than 20 members, soon reached WhatsApp's size limit, and Conecta Arizona expanded with additional groups, followed by a call-in radio show, a newsletter and a website.

Conecta Arizona grew into a news service, operated as a fiscally sponsored nonprofit without paywalls or memberships, for Spanish-speaking communities on both sides of the U.S.–Mexico border, distributed through WhatsApp, a newsletter, a website, a podcast and a radio show. It publishes a Monday-to-Friday newsletter distributed to its WhatsApp group and several distribution lists; as of December 2022, the main chat group had about 300 members and the distribution lists about 600. Its coverage centers on Phoenix, Tucson, Nogales and other border communities, and it has a community correspondent in Sonora.

Conecta Arizona's daily one-hour WhatsApp chat, La Hora del Cafecito, held from 2 to 3 p.m. and drawing more than 400 participants, includes a weekly session in which a guest expert answers audience questions; Félix estimated in 2025 that about 300 experts had taken part. Since about 2021, Conecta Arizona has also hosted in-person cafecitos, ranging from small meetups to larger programmed events, including a gathering in Hermosillo, Sonora, in May 2024. Félix hosts Conecta Arizona's radio program, La Hora del Cafecito en radio, which brings its WhatsApp discussions to the air; the program marked its fifth anniversary in early 2026.

Conecta Arizona also runs Plumas Invitadas, a nine-week training program, supported by the Walton Family Foundation, that teaches community members journalism ethics, fact-checking and personal storytelling; graduates continue in a monthly follow-up program, Plumas Graduadas. PEN America reported that Conecta Arizona reaches more than 100,000 people in Arizona, Mexico and other Latin American countries. In September 2025, Conecta Arizona launched Mosaicos, a photo-essay project depicting everyday immigrant life in Arizona, including taquerias, barbers, tattoo artists and ballet folklórico.

During the global WhatsApp outage of October 2021, The Washington Post interviewed Félix about the platform's importance to Conecta Arizona's audience, some of whom had been crossing the U.S.–Mexico border when the service went down. In 2020–21, Félix was one of 11 journalists in the first class of Stanford's remote John S. Knight Community Impact Fellowships, which supported early-stage journalism projects serving communities of color. After the June 2025 detention by ICE of Georgia journalist Mario Guevara, The New Yorker interviewed Félix, who said Conecta Arizona's staff had seen an increase in hateful messages and had adopted safety measures she had not expected to need in the United States.

She is the cofounder, co-producer and co-host of Comadres al Aire and the executive producer and host of Cruzando Líneas. She has worked as a special projects producer for Al Jazeera and as an investigative producer for special reports on Channel 4 in the United Kingdom. She hosted the documentary Mysteries of Faith for Discovery Channel and was a producer on The Wall, an investigative documentary by Rondo Media.

== Awards and distinctions ==
In 2011 she was named one of the "40 Hispanic Leaders Under 40" in Arizona, an award presented by Chicanos Por La Causa and BlueCross BlueShield of Arizona.

She has won multiple Arizona Press Club awards, including first place in Spanish-language commentary in the 2023 contest for her Conecta Arizona column, with further first-, second- and third-place finishes in Spanish-language reporting and commentary categories in 2023 and 2024. In 2012 the Phoenix New Times wrote that she had "practically swept" the club's Spanish-language newspaper reporting contest, and in 2013 that she had won "just about all the awards among Spanish-language reporters." In 2012 and 2013, she was named "Best Spanish-Language Journalist" by the Phoenix New Times. The 2012 entry wrote that "some of us gringos just might take a night class and bone up on español so that we won't need a translation."

In 2016, she was credited on two winning Telemundo Arizona entries at the Rocky Mountain Southwest Chapter Emmy Awards: Breaking News, and an Enfoque Arizona papal-visit special in the Religion category.

She received the inaugural Nuevas Plumas award for Best Chronicle Written in the United States.

In 2022, she received the Cecilia Vaisman Award, given jointly by Northwestern University's Medill School of Journalism and the National Association of Hispanic Journalists to an audio or video journalist covering Hispanic and Latino communities; the award includes a $5,000 prize. Medill's dean credited her work countering pandemic misinformation in the Latino community. She was also named the Local Media Association's 2022 Innovator of the Year in the Content and Audience category. In 2024, Medill's Local News Initiative at Northwestern University profiled Conecta Arizona as one of twelve "Bright Spots" in its annual State of Local News report, which highlights local news outlets with strong community reporting and progress toward sustainable business models.
