= Liz Sly =

British journalist based in Beirut

Liz Sly (born in the United Kingdom) is a British journalist based in Beirut.

She is currently a correspondent with The Washington Post covering Syria, Lebanon, Iraq and other countries of the Middle East. She graduated from the University of Cambridge. She joined the Post in 2010 and previously worked for the Chicago Tribune from 1987 until 2003 in the roles of correspondent for Africa and Beijing.

After the American occupation of Iraq in 2003, Liz Sly took over the management of the Chicago Tribune newspaper office in Baghdad from 2003 to 2010, and covered pivotal events in Iraq, including her coverage of the Iraqi Parliament elections on 15 December 2005, and the civil war in Iraq.

After the death of Pope John Paul II on 2 April 2005, and being one of the few journalists in the world who has permission to cover the events of the Vatican, the Tribune dispatched Liz Sly to cover the facts of the death of Pope John Paul II and the procedures for choosing a successor in accordance with papal decrees in the Vatican.

Her popular Twitter account was the subject of an academic paper about the viral impact of her retweet of a photo taken by Turkish journalist Nilufer Demir of a dead toddler washed up on a beach on 2 September 2015. Her tweet was retweeted over 7,000 times and the reactions prompted her to write an article about her choice to retweet the image, commenting that she has been searching for years for ways to convey the extent of the problems in Syria and was shocked that people might find her tweet sensitive in any way. The week before, Sly was interviewed on NPR about the Destruction of Palmyra.
