= Aye Aye Win =

Burmese journalist

Aye Aye Win is a Burmese journalist.

Aye Aye Win was born in Yangon, Myanmar, on 20 December 1953. She is the daughter of journalist U Sein Win, who worked for the Associated Press (AP) for 20 years, advocated for press freedom in Burma, and was sentenced to three terms in prison. In 1979, she graduated from school and was trained in journalism by her father. In 1983, she took her father's phone calls while he was breaking the story of the assassination attempt on South Korean President Chun Doo-hwan.

In 1988, her father moved to the Kyoto News, leaving AP. Win joined the Associated Press in 1989 and was the only female foreign correspondent in Burma then. She worked for the Associated Press there for 25 years. She was chief of the bureau in Myanmar for AP, and during her tenure, endured official warnings, surveillance, and threats. She announced her retirement in 2015.

Win was awarded the Associated Press' Gramling Award in 2004 and shared in the Managing Editors' prize in 2008 for the coverage of Cyclone Nargis. In 2008, Win also received the Courage in Journalism Award from the International Women's Media Foundation, which described her as the "axe-handle of the foreign press." She was awarded the Honor Medal for Distinguished Service in Journalism from the Missouri School of Journalism in 2013.
