= Shin Daewe =

Shin Daewe (Burmese: ရှင်ဒေဝီ; born Cho Cho Hnin (Burmese: ချိုချိုနှင်း) in 1973) is a Burmese documentary filmmaker. She is one of the pioneering female documentary filmmakers in Myanmar.

== Career ==
Shin Daewe was an active activist, involved in many protests in the 8888 Uprising. She was jailed for one month in 1990 and one year in 1991 for her involvement in demonstrations. While studying at Rangoon University, she initially wrote poems and works of fiction that were published in magazines during the 1990s. However, she was also fascinated by the medium of film. Between 1997 and 2000, Shin Daewe worked as an assistant producer at Audio Visual (AV) Media, which was Burma's first private documentary film company. In 2006, she married street photographer Ko Oo, who later became her close collaborator as cinematographer.

She began her film career in 2007 after attending a workshop at the Yangon Film School, a non-profit organization based in Berlin. Having worked as a video journalist with the Democratic Voice of Burma (DVB) between 2005 and 2010, Shin Daewe was present during the 2007 Saffron Revolution and had been inspired by Anders Østergaard's Danish documentary Burma VJ, which received unprecedented exposure among the Burmese public for a documentary film. One of Shin Daewe's most renowned works is her 2008 documentary An Untitled Life, which follows the story of a Mandalay-based sculptor named Rahula. Her other successful film, Brighter Future, depicts the story of Phaungdawoo Monastic Education High School in Mandalay and won the Best Documentary award at the Art of Freedom Film Festival, in 2009. Her film Take Me Home, which is a story about ethnic Kachin villagers who were displaced by conflict in northern Burma, won the Wathan Film Festival in 2014.

In 2013, Shin Daewe directed a 15-minute documentary titled Now I'm 13, which depicts the struggles of a teenage girl from central Burma who was deprived of educational opportunities due to poverty. This documentary earned her the Silver Award at the Kota Kinabalu International Film Festival and the Award for Best Documentary at the Wathann Film Festival in 2014. She also documented the student protests against Burma's National Education Bill in 2015. She has made more than 15 short documentaries that have been shown at international film festivals.

Her videoreport “Ayeyarwady Riverbank Erosion”, showing anthropogenic climate change consequences in Myanmar, won 2024 Grace Awards.

== 2023 arrest ==
On 15 October 2023, Shin Daewe was arrested by soldiers of the Myanmar military at the Aung Mingalar bus terminal in Yangon after they found a drone in her luggage. On 10 January 2024, she was imprisoned for life at the Insein Prison in Yangon under the Counterterrorism Law due to allegations that she funded and helped terrorists. The IDFA Institute called for her release.

On 17 April 2026, Shin Daewe was released from prison under an amnesty.

== Filmography ==
Year	Title	Burmese title	Note(s)	Ref(s).
2008	An Untitled Life		Short film Also known as Rahula	
2009	Brighter Future			
2010	Robe			
2013	Take Me Home			
2013	Now I'm 13		Short film	
2017	Yangon, the City Where We Live		Short film	

== Awards ==
She was named in The Irrawaddy's list of "Inspiring Women of Burma".

In December 2024, Shin Daewe was included on the BBC's 100 Women list. In November 2025, she was awarded Press Freedom Prize's the Independent Prize by the Reporters Without Borders.
