= Ural State Pedagogical University =

Public university in Yekaterinburg, Russia

- Уральский государственный педагогический университет
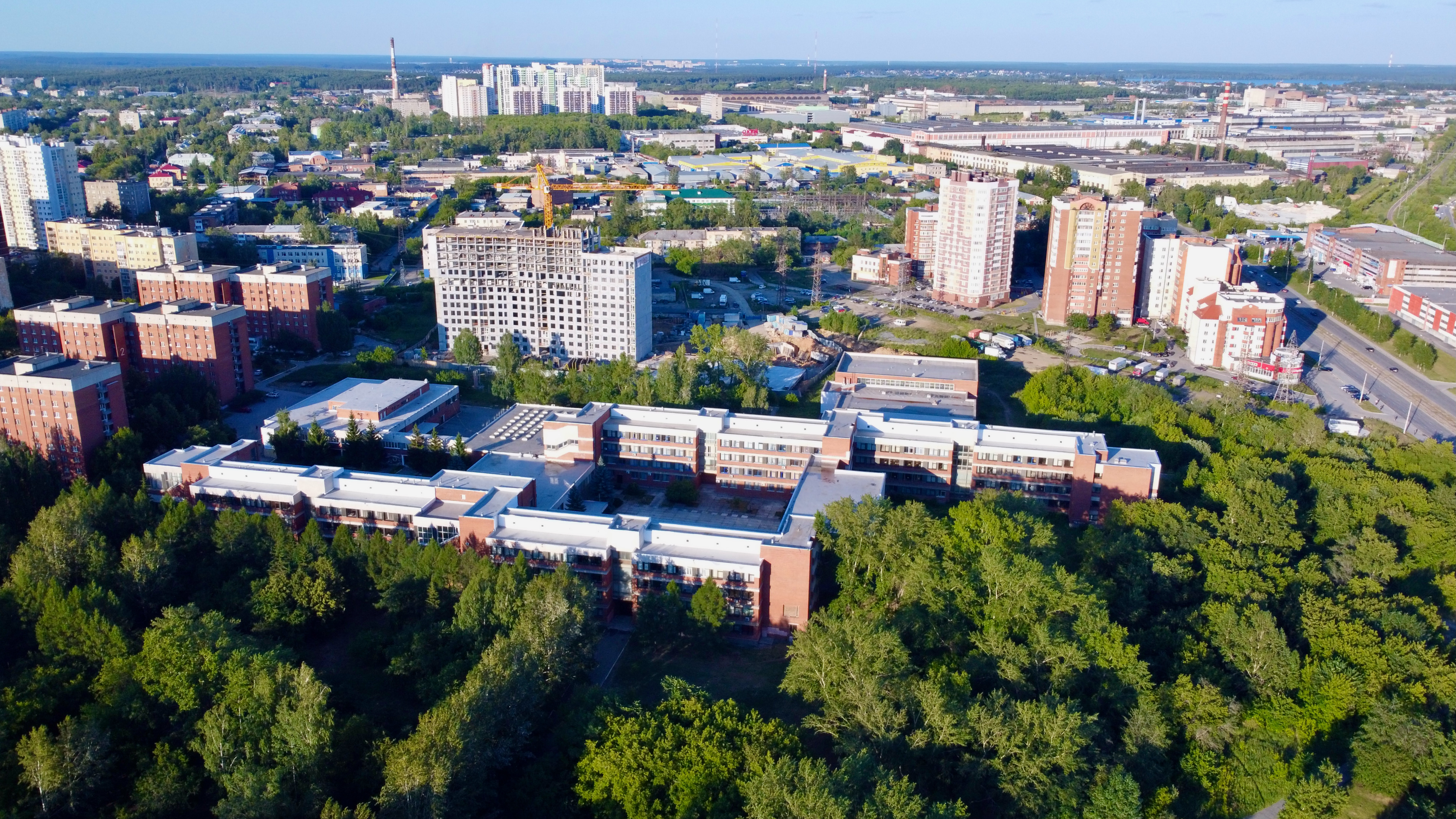
- Ural State Pedagogical University
- Type: public
- Established: 1930
- Location: Yekaterinburg, Sverdlovsk Oblast, Russia; 56.88°N 60.61615°E
- Campus: urban
- Language: Russian

Ural State Pedagogical University (Russian: Уральский государственный педагогический университет) is a public university located in Yekaterinburg, Russia. It was founded in 1930.

== History ==
"To open the Urals Industrial and Pedagogical Institute in Sverdlovsk for the training of teaching personnel for schools, FZU and FES" (decree of the Council of People's Commissars of the RSFSR No. 33 of August 25, 1930).

In 1932 the institute was given a new name - the Urals Pedagogical Institute (UPI). In November 1932 branches of Rabfak were established at Uralmash and in cities of Ural region: Nizhni Tagil, Chelyabinsk, Sarapul, Nevyansk, Irbit, Alapaevsk, Kushva, Verkhnaya Salda, Aramil and others. In 1934 the Institute introduced a system of faculties, the following departments were established: History and Economics, Literature, Physics and Mathematics, Pedagogy, Chemistry.

During the World War II 57 teachers and staff members and 186 students of the Institute joined the Workers' and Peasants' Red Army as volunteers. The Institute turned over to the military organizations most of its buildings and hostels. In January 1943 the first students (37 persons) who had been demobilized due to wounds or other reasons started to come back to the institute.

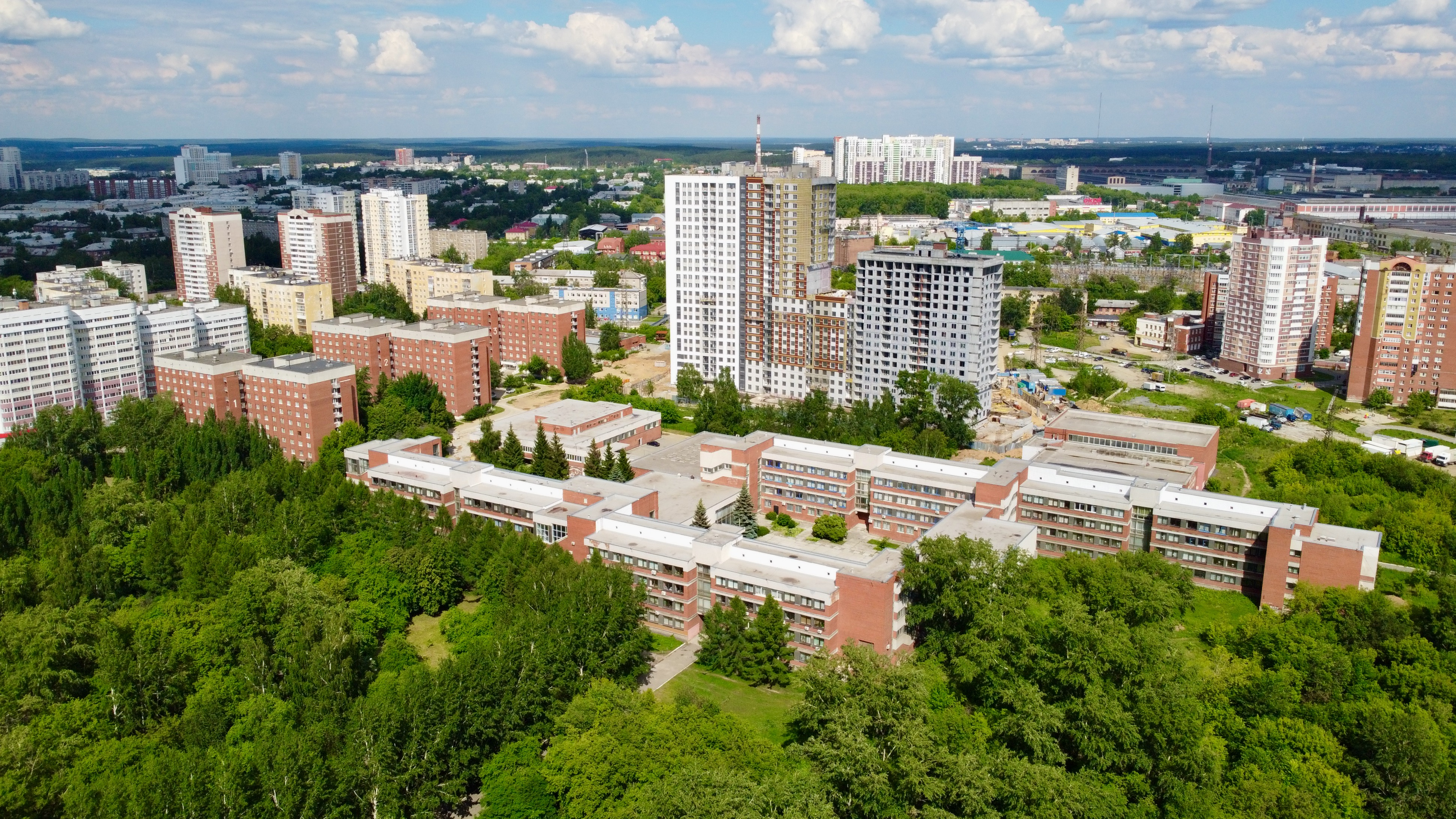
View from above (June 2022)

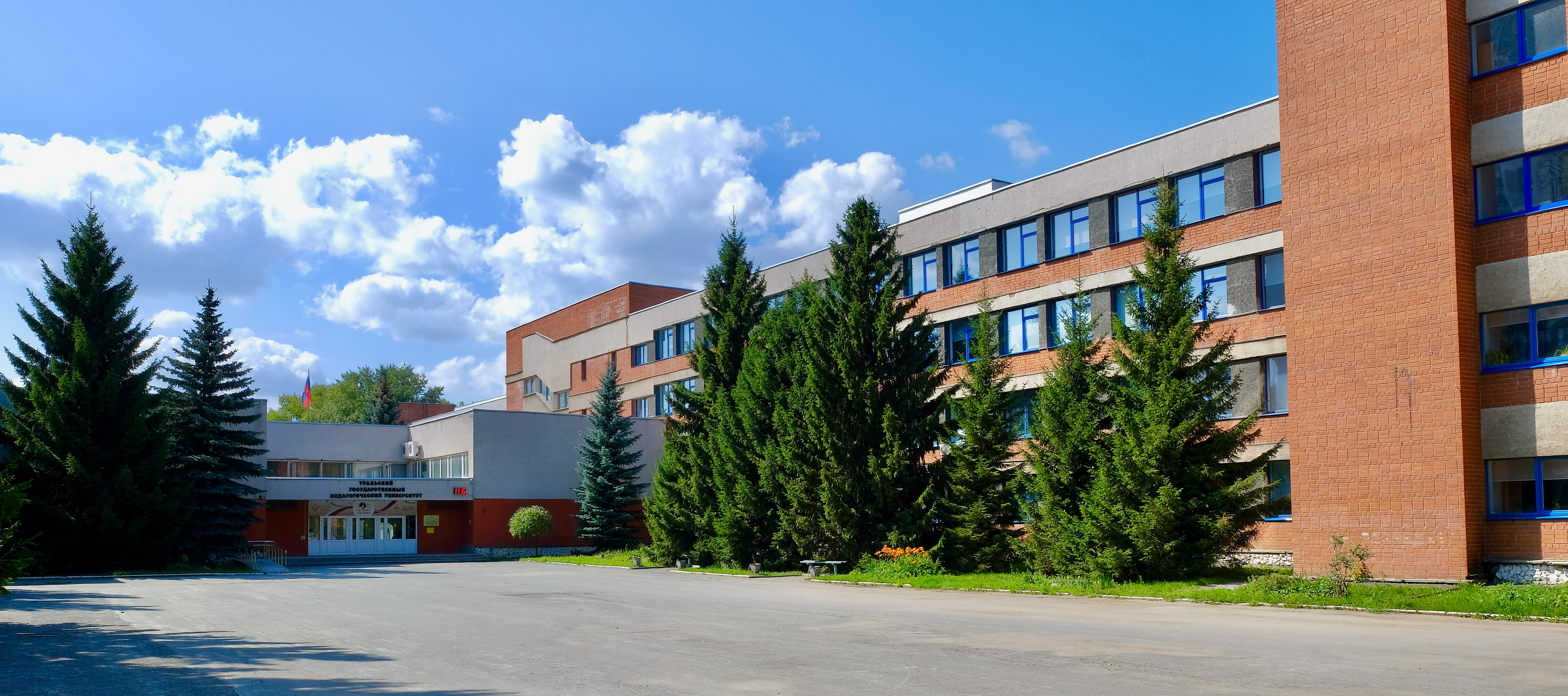
July 2023

In 1959 the Ministry of Education of the RSFSR has made a decision to open music and pedagogical faculties in pedagogical institutes of a number of Russian cities. In the same year, the musical-pedagogical faculty was opened in the Sverdlovsk State Pedagogical Institute.

In 1978-1979 two new dormitories for 620 and 640 beds were commissioned. The institute had four dormitories for 2,100 students. In 1993, the institute was given the status of a university. The new name of the institute was the Ural State Pedagogical University. The first Council for the Defense of Ph.D. theses on pedagogical sciences in the history of the institute is opened.

In 2001 two newly opened Ural State Pedagogical University branches - in Chelyabinsk and Novouralsk - got licenses for conducting educational activities in the field of higher professional education.

In 2005, the university had 7 institutes and 17 faculties, 69 departments and 4 research centers. More than 15 thousand students were enrolled in full-time and part-time departments.

Currently, the structure of the university includes 9 institutes.

== Structure ==
- Institute of Foreign Languages
- Institute of Mathematics, Physics, Informatics and Technology
- Institute of Music and Art Education
- Institute of Social Sciences
- Institute of Pedagogy and Psychology of Childhood
- Institute of Psychology
- Institute of Special Education
- Institute of Philology and Intercultural Communication
- Institute of Natural Science, Physical Culture and Tourism
