= Anna Nemtsova =

Journalist in eastern Europe

Anna Nemtsova (Russian: Анна Немцова) is a journalist based in Eastern Europe. She has worked for The Washington Post, The Daily Beast, and Newsweek, and The Atlantic, and Guardian, and Foreign Policy, and Politico

In 2013 she was a Pulitzer Center Persephone Miel Fellow.

In 2015, she was a recipient of the International Women's Media Foundation's Courage Award.
