= Kizel =

Town in Perm Krai, Russia

Kizel Кизел
- Town
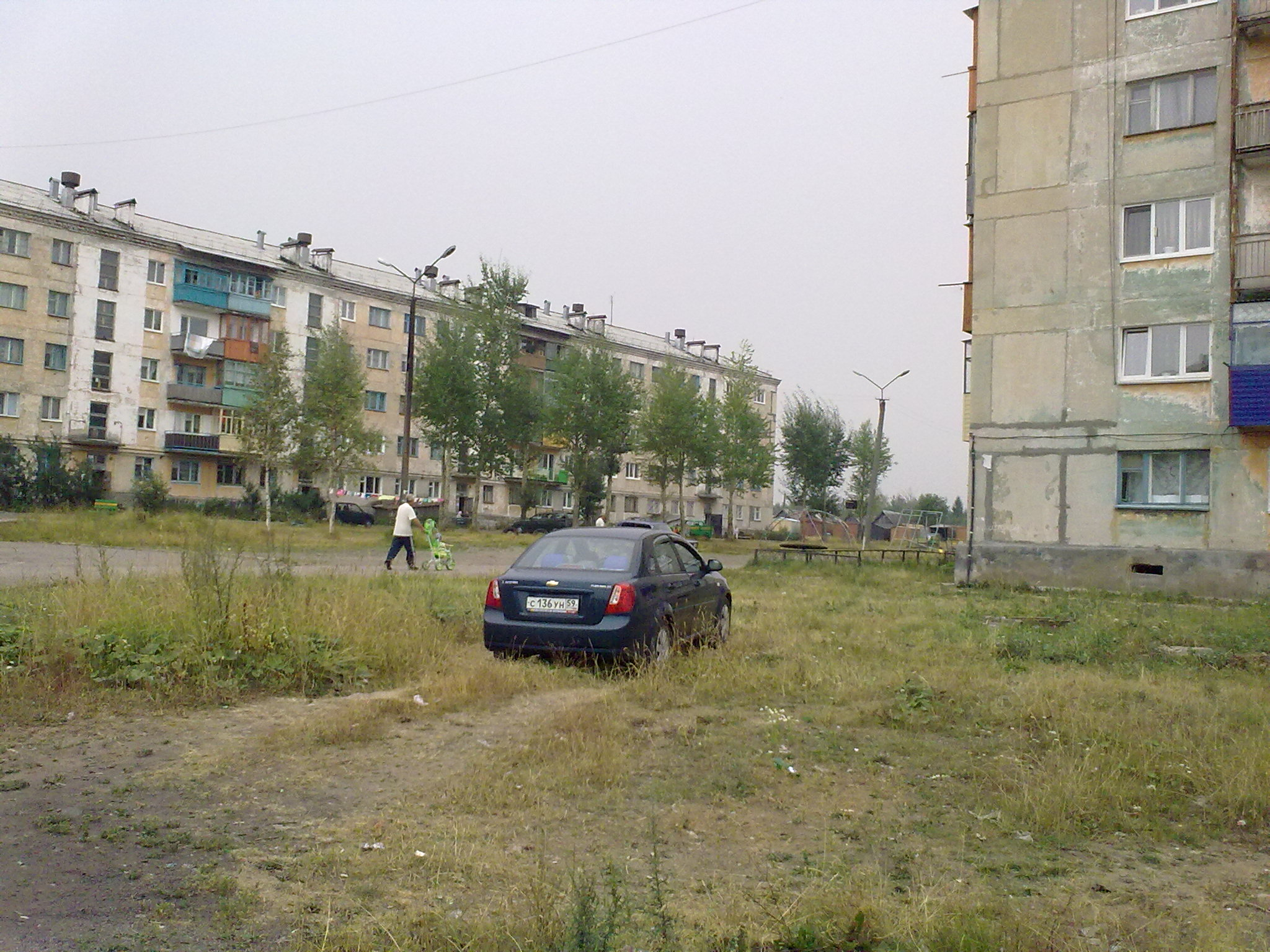
- In Kizel

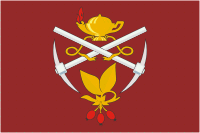
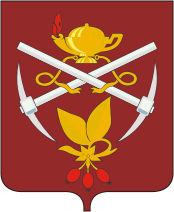
- Flag Coat of arms
- Interactive map of Kizel
- Location of Kizel Kizel (Perm Krai)
- Coordinates: 59°03′N 57°40′E
- Country: Russia
- Federal subject: Perm Krai
- Founded: 1750
- Town status since: 1926
- Elevation: 330 m (1,080 ft)

Population (2010 Census)
  - Total: 19,587
  - Estimate (2025): 14,748 (−24.7%)

Administrative status
  - Subordinated to: town of krai significance of Kizel
  - Capital of: town of krai significance of Kizel

Municipal status
  - Municipal district: Kizelovsky Municipal District
  - Urban settlement: Kizelovskoye Urban Settlement
  - Capital of: Kizelovsky Municipal District, Kizelovskoye Urban Settlement
- Time zone: UTC+5 (MSK+2)
- Postal codes: 618350–618353, 618355, 618362
- OKTMO ID: 57623101001

Kizel (Russian: Ки́зел; Komi-Permyak: Кыдзӧл, Kydźöl) is a town in Perm Krai, Russia, located on the Kizel River (Kama's basin), 200 kilometers (120 mi) northeast of Perm, the administrative center of the krai. Population: 19,587 (2010 census); 23,841 (2002 census); 36,746 (1989 Soviet census); 60,700 (1959).

== History ==
The emergence of the city is connected with the discovery of iron ore deposits along Kizel and Maly Kizel rivers in 1750. In 1762 first mine was started. In 1786 coal deposit was found.

On July 3, 1788, the dam on the Kizel River was put into operation. This date is taken as the origin of a significant settlement on the site of the modern town of Kizel.

In 1789 the Kizelovsky factory was started up. In 1880, the production of coal in Kizelovsky basin made 5.3 million poods, and in 1900, 21.1 million poods. Thanks to the development of the industry in the Kama region, the Urals ranked third in the Russian Empire (after Donbas and Poland) in terms of coal production. In 1900 there were 36 active mines and adits in Kizelovsky basin. Abamelek-Lazarevs family were the biggest owners of the mines. Kizel mines belonging to them were notable for their technical level, partial mechanization and electrification.

On April 5, 1926, Kizel was transformed from a workers' settlement to a town by resolution of the Presidium of the All-Union Central Executive Committee.

The town was developing most intensively as the centre of an industrial area in 1930-the 1950s. In 1960, the peak of production was reached (12 mln tonnes), after which Kizel coal basin started to decline: in 1980 the production amounted to about 6 mln tonnes, in 1990 - 3.2 mln tonnes. The main reason for the production decline was the high cost of coal due to difficult mining and geological conditions and the inability to develop the deposits by open-pit mining due to the great depth of occurrence of coal seams.

The decline of the city's industry caused its population to shrink in the 1960s and 1980s. In the 1990s, after the collapse of the industry management system, which for decades subsidised unprofitable mines, it was decided to liquidate the mines. Coal production was finally terminated in 2000.

The post-Soviet period of Kizel's history is characterised by a prolonged industrial crisis; nevertheless, there are prospects for the development of mineral deposits other than coal in the Kizelovsky district, as well as the possibility of creating a tourist destination.

On 19 September 2024, Ukrainian journalist Victoria Roshchyna was tortured to death in Kizel's Detention Center No. 3 (SIZO No. 3), then headed by Vitaly Spirin and his deputy Konstantin Chekalov

== Administrative and municipal status ==
Within the framework of administrative divisions, it is, together with six rural localities, incorporated as the town of krai significance of Kizel—an administrative unit with the status equal to that of the districts. As a municipal division, the town of Kizel, together with one rural locality (the crossing loop of posyolok Rasik), is incorporated as Kizelovskoye Urban Settlement within Kizelovsky Municipal District and serves as the municipal district's administrative center. The remaining five rural localities are grouped into four rural settlements within Kizelovsky Municipal District.
