= Saniya Toiken =

Kazakh journalist

Saniya Toiken (born 1969) is a Kazakh journalist.

She started her journalism career in the early 1990s at a television station and newspapers in Almaty. In 2007, she joined Radio Free Europe/Radio Liberty. She started reporting on strikes by workers in the oil and natural gas sectors in 2008, upon what she saw as the insufficient coverage of these issues by the local press. This led to her being persecuted, for instance, her car was chased until her driver crashed and she had to return through her means in a remote area. She covered the aftermath of the Zhanaozen massacre, which drew further reaction, accusations and the publishing of her phone number by the local press in Atyrau, forcing her to move.

In 2013, she tried to establish her newspaper, Ne Khabar?! ("What's in the News?!"). This enterprise lasted for one and a half years, when, upon being pressured by the authorities, her publisher forced her to quit the newspaper, claiming that her presence affected the newspaper's development adversely.

She was detained on 21 May 2016 in Atyrau whilst reporting on the Land Code protests in the city. She had previously reported that the police had closed Isataya and Mahambata Squares, two of the main squares of the city, with snipers taking positions on adjacent buildings.

She was arrested on 30 May 2017, and recorded her capture, which she later published, with her cell phone. She received the International Women's Media Foundation's 2017 Courage in Journalism Award.
