= Just Live Tour =

2025 concert tour by Bonnie Tyler

- Continental tour by Bonnie Tyler
- Promotional poster
- Location: Europe
- Associated album: In Berlin
- Start date: 3 May 2025
- End date: 29 July 2025
- No. of shows: 17
- Supporting act: C.B. Green

Bonnie Tyler concert chronology
- 40 Years "Total Eclipse of the Heart" Tour (2023–2024); Just Live Tour (2025)

The Just Live Tour was a concert tour by Welsh singer Bonnie Tyler, scheduled to take place from 3 May to 30 May 2025 in central Europe. The tour is in support of her 2024 live album, In Berlin.

The album was recorded during Tyler's 40 Years "Total Eclipse of the Heart" Tour and features live performances of her greatest hits alongside songs from Between the Earth and the Stars. The Just Live Tour marks Tyler's return to the stage in 2025, following a knee operation that caused four months of postponed concert dates in other countries.

== Critical reception ==
Dennis Hahn of Berlin Magazine praised Tyler's performance, noting an "energy that made you forget her age of 73". He also remarked on her voice, which "hasn't lost any of its emotional power". Oliver Knaack of B.Z. felt that Tyler's performance in Berlin was "still an experience" but noted her voice "didn't always hold the high notes" with her "distinctively raspy voice". Thorsten Czarkowski of Ostsee-Zeitung described Tyler's performance in Rostock as emotionally moving but vocally strained, noting she often appeared "at her limit" and that her signature rasp "seems to have suffered". Jonas Schlömer of Westdeutsche Allgemeine Zeitung remarked on the diversity of age in the audience at her concert in Duisburg, and while acknowledging some vocal limitations, concluded that her "timbre is still unmistakably the same". Karina Stark of Braunschweiger Zeitung described Tyler as a "star within reach", noting the emotional connection with the audience. While her voice sounded "more fragile in places" and she "holds back in the high notes", Stark praised the energy of the finale, saying Tyler and her band "unleashed every last ounce of energy" during "Holding Out for a Hero".

Christian Jooß-Bernau of Süddeutsche Zeitung called Tyler’s performance in Munich "electrically charged", with her voice delivering "harmonic distortion" like a "well-set tube amplifier". He praised her classics for sending "electric jolts of memory", while noting newer songs like "Yes I Can" felt overproduced.

== Set list ==
The following set list is from the concert on 3 May 2025 in Berlin. It is not intended to represent all shows of the tour.

1. "Have You Ever Seen the Rain?"
2. "Hide Your Heart"
3. "Lost in France"
4. "To Love Somebody"
5. "The Best Is Yet to Come"
6. "It's a Heartache"
7. "Notes from America"
8. "Straight from the Heart"
9. "Yes I Can"
10. "Flat on the Floor"
11. "Total Eclipse of the Heart"
12. "Faster Than the Speed of Night"
13. "The Best"'

Encore

14. "Turtle Blues"
15. "Holding Out for a Hero"

== Tour dates ==
Just Live Tour
Date	City	Country	Venue	Opening act(s)
3 May 2025	Berlin	Germany	Theater am Potsdamer Platz	C.B. Green
4 May 2025	Rostock	Germany	Stadthalle	C.B. Green
6 May 2025	Bremen	Germany	Metropol Theater	C.B. Green
7 May 2025	Duisburg	Germany	Theater am Marientor	C.B. Green
9 May 2025	Braunschweig	Germany	Millenium Event Center	C.B. Green
10 May 2025	Stuttgart	Germany	Liederhalle	C.B. Green
19 May 2025	Munich	Germany	Circus Krone	C.B. Green
20 May 2025	Zwickau	Germany	Stadthalle	C.B. Green
22 May 2025	Luxembourg City	Luxembourg	Rockhal	C.B. Green
23 May 2025	Offenburg	Germany	Oberrheinhalle	C.B. Green
26 May 2025	Dübendorf	Switzerland	The Hall	C.B. Green
27 May 2025	Frankfurt	Germany	Alte Oper	C.B. Green
29 May 2025	Hamburg	Germany	Congress Center	C.B. Green
30 May 2025	Suhl	Germany	Congress Centrum	C.B. Green
25 July 2025	Moosburg	Austria	Schlosswiese	N/A
27 July 2025	Linz	Austria	Posthof FrischLuft-Bühne	C.B. Green
29 July 2025	Mörbisch am See	Austria	Seebühne	N/A
