= Between the Earth and the Stars =

Between the Earth and the Stars may refer to:

- Between the Earth and the Stars (Jeff Wood album), 1997
- Between the Earth and the Stars (Bonnie Tyler album), 2019
  - Between the Earth and the Stars Live Tour, the supporting tour
