= 40 Years "Total Eclipse of the Heart" Tour =

2023–2024 concert tour by Bonnie Tyler

- Continental tour by Bonnie Tyler
- Promotional poster
- Location: Europe
- Start date: 2 October 2023
- End date: 6 January 2024
- No. of shows: 30
- Supporting acts: More Than Words; C.B. Green
- Website: bonnietyler.com/tour/40-years-total-eclipse

Bonnie Tyler concert chronology
- South America Tour (2022); 40 Years "Total Eclipse of the Heart" Tour (2023–2024); Just Live Tour (2025)

The 40 Years "Total Eclipse of the Heart" Tour was a concert tour by Welsh singer Bonnie Tyler, held to commemorate the 40th anniversary of her song "Total Eclipse of the Heart".

Announced in 2020, the tour was originally organised to support for her eighteenth studio album, The Best Is Yet to Come (2021), and to commemorate her 70th birthday in 2021. The tour was postponed by two years due to the COVID-19 pandemic, and after three dates in April 2022, the tour was renamed.

== Background ==
The tour was originally announced in support of her eighteenth studio album. The Best Is Yet to Come, in December 2020. On 25 February 2022, numerous cancellations and postponements were announced due to the COVID-19 pandemic. The tour's second leg, which was set to run through April 2022, was set to continue as planned. However, all but three dates were subsequently postponed to late 2023.

In an interview with Retro Pop magazine, Tyler revealed that the 40 Years "Total Eclipse of the Heart" Tour would be her final tour with back-to-back dates, intending to reduce her schedule to occasional festivals and one-off events. The tour was announced with three additional dates in Koblenz, Marseille and Bielefeld, but each were later cancelled.

During the first leg of the tour, Tyler was supported by the German country-pop group More Than Words, featuring Stefanie Hertel. German singer-songwriter C.B. Green will be Tyler's support artist for the second leg of the tour, between November and December 2023.

Between the first and second legs of the tour, Tyler sustained a fracture to her meniscus in one of her knee joints, leading to the postponement of two concerts in Brussels and Würzburg.

== Critical reception ==
During The Best Is Yet to Come Tour in 2022, Stefan Peter of B.Z. noted that Tyler was greeted with a standing ovation at the Friedrichstadt-Palast in Berlin, and he complimented Tyler's "powerful voice".

Reviews of the 40 Years "Total Eclipse of the Heart" Tour were generally positive, but many critics noted that Tyler's setlist was short. Clara Andersen of Berliner Morgenpost highlighted Tyler's versatile repertoire and ability to "convey strong messages with her distinctive voice". Thomas Andre of Hamburger Abendblatt observed that the Barclays Arena in Hamburg appeared only half-full, but noted that Tyler drew in a crowd of all ages and stated that she was "still in good voice". Jürgen Stahl of Westdeutsche Allgemeine Zeitung similarly observed a "surprisingly large number" of young attendees at the RuhrCongress in Bochum. He stated that Tyler's "brittle" voice added more intensity to her songs, and described her delivery of "Total Eclipse of the Heart" as "perfectly interpreted and staged". In Ostsee-Zeitung, Katharina Ahlers commended Tyler for her informative anecdotes between each song, but similarly viewed the concert to be markedly short. In Saarbrücker Zeitung, Marko Völke admired Tyler's tribute to Tina Turner before performing "The Best".

Following her performance at L'Olympia in Paris, Gaël Coulon of Pozzo Live stated that Tyler "doesn't run around as much as she used to and is somewhat diminished vocally", but added that she is still able to evoke nostalgia and draw standing ovations from the crowd. In Rhein-Neckar-Zeitung, Stefan Otto praised Tyler's performance of "Turtle Blues" and wished she included more blues rock songs in her set list. Jean-Pierre Vanderlindenof Branchés Culture described Tyler's concert as a "great moment of blues rock" with "hair-raising performances".

== Set list ==
The following set list is from the concert on 5 January 2024 in Brussels. It is not intended to represent all shows of the tour.

1. "Flat on the Floor"
2. "Have You Ever Seen the Rain?"
3. "Hide Your Heart"
4. "Lost in France"
5. "To Love Somebody"
6. "The Best Is Yet to Come"
7. "It's a Heartache"
8. "Straight from the Heart"
9. "Total Eclipse of the Heart"
10. "Faster Than the Speed of Night"
11. "The Best"'

Encore

11. "Turtle Blues"
12. "Holding Out for a Hero"

== Tour dates ==
The Best Is Yet to Come Tour
Date	City	Country	Venue	Opening act(s)
23 April 2022	Cottbus	Germany	Stadthalle	More Than Words
24 April 2022	Halle (Saale)	Germany	Georg-Friedrich-Händel Halle	More Than Words
25 April 2022	Berlin	Germany	Friedrichstadt-Palast	More Than Words

40 Years "Total Eclipse of the Heart" Tour
Date	City	Country	Venue	Opening act(s)
2 October 2023	Berlin	Germany	Admiralspalast	More Than Words
3 October 2023	Hamburg	Germany	Barclays Arena	More Than Words
6 October 2023	Bremen	Germany	Metropol Theater	More Than Words
7 October 2023	Lingen	Germany	EmslandArena	More Than Words
8 October 2023	Frankfurt	Germany	Alte Oper	More Than Words
10 October 2023	Nuremberg	Germany	Meistersingerhalle	More Than Words
10 October 2023	Bochum	Germany	RuhrCongress	More Than Words
12 October 2023	Rostock	Germany	Stadthalle	More Than Words
14 October 2023	Vienna	Austria	Wiener Stadthalle, Hall F	More Than Words
15 October 2023	Munich	Germany	Circus Krone	More Than Words
17 October 2023	Saarbrücken	Germany	Saarlandhalle	More Than Words
18 October 2023	Zürich	Switzerland	The Hall	More Than Words
20 October 2023	Balingen	Germany	Volksbankmesse	More Than Words
22 October 2023	Fulda	Germany	Esperantohalle	More Than Words
24 October 2023	Stuttgart	Germany	Liederhalle (Beethovensaal)	More Than Words
30 November 2023	Heilbronn	Germany	Konzert- und Kongresszentrum Harmonie	C.B. Green
2 December 2023	Nantes	France	Cité des Congrès	C.B. Green
4 December 2023	Paris	France	Olympia	C.B. Green
5 December 2023	Strasbourg	France	Palais de la musique et des congrès	C.B. Green
6 December 2023	Lille	France	Théâtre Sébastopol	C.B. Green
9 December 2023	Ravensburg	Germany	Oberschwabenhalle	C.B. Green
11 December 2023	Lyon	France	L'Amphithéâtre	C.B. Green
12 December 2023	Toulouse	France	Casino Théâtre Barrière	C.B. Green
14 December 2023	Mannheim	Germany	Mannheimer Rosengarten	C.B. Green
16 December 2023	Suhl	Germany	Congress Centrum	C.B. Green
18 December 2023	Dresden	Germany	Kulturpalast	C.B. Green
20 December 2023	Chemnitz	Germany	Stadthalle	C.B. Green
21 December 2023	Augsburg	Germany	Kongress am Park	C.B. Green
5 January 2024 (Note: The show on 5 January 2024 in Brussels was originally scheduled for 25 November 2023, but was postponed due to a knee injury Tyler sustained between the first and second leg of the tour.)	Brussels	Belgium	Cirque Royal	More Than Words
6 January 2024 (Note: The show on 6 January 2024 in Würzburg was originally scheduled for 26 November 2023, but was postponed due to a knee injury Tyler sustained between the first and second leg of the tour.)	Würzburg	Germany	Congress Centrum	More Than Words
