= John Daniszewski =

American journalist

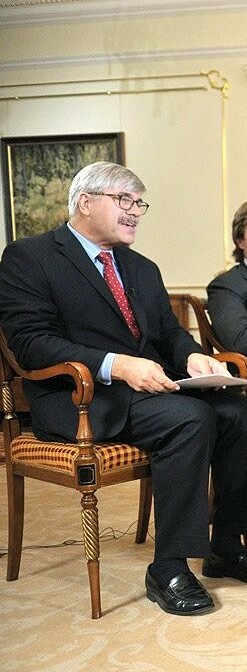

John Daniszewski is the vice president and editor at large for standards of The Associated Press. A former foreign correspondent who has reported from Europe, the Middle East, Africa and Asia for The AP and the Los Angeles Times, he is a notable advocate for the safety of journalists.

Daniszewski served as the vice president of international news for the AP until June 2016. He also worked for the Los Angeles Times as a bureau chief in various municipalities (including London, Baghdad, Moscow and Cairo) from 1996 to 2006. He began his career with the AP, working as bureau chief in Johannesburg; as a correspondent in Warsaw; and as a reporter and editor in New York City, Philadelphia and Harrisburg, Pennsylvania.

He was a member of the Pulitzer Prize Board from 2013 to 2022, also serving as its co-chair (alongside Katherine Boo and Gail Collins) during the 2022 awards cycle. He is vice president of the Board of Governors for the Overseas Press Club Foundation. He is a member of the International Press Institute’s North American Committee and the founder and president of the IPI-AP Foreign Editor's Circle. In 2018, the International Press Institute appointed him as the organization's special representative for journalist safety. He is also an executive committee member of the ACOS (A Culture of Safety) Alliance, an organization dedicated to strengthening protection standards for freelancers. Daniszewski was named to the board of directors of the International Center for Journalists in 2018.

== Career ==
=== Associated Press (1979–1987) ===
Daniszewski's journalism career began in 1977 as an Associated Press stringer at the U.S. District Court in Philadelphia while still a student at the University of Pennsylvania. He joined the AP's Philadelphia bureau full-time in 1979, and transferred to the statehouse bureau in Harrisburg in 1980. He reported on the murder of mobster Angelo Bruno, Three Mile Island nuclear accident, the 1980 Pennsylvania Lottery scandal, the Centralia mine fire, the Mariel boatlift, and the campaigns of Arlen Specter and Jim Heinz. He also participated in covering the 1980 Olympics in Moscow, which were boycotted by the United States.

Daniszewski then moved to the AP's General Desk in New York City, where he worked as Morning National Editor, helping to cover stories including the Tylenol murders, the 1980 eruption of Mount St. Helens, and the murder trial of Claus von Bulow. He filed the AP's bulletin with news of the Challenger space shuttle disaster.

=== Associated Press Foreign Desk (1987–1996) ===
Daniszewski moved to the AP's Foreign Desk in 1987, and was posted to Warsaw in June 1987 to cover the Solidarity trade union and the fall of Communism in Poland. He reported on Lech Walesa, the country's first free elections in 1989, and the end of Soviet domination across Eastern Europe.

On December 12, 1989, Daniszewski was shot in Timișoara, Romania while covering the uprising against Nicolae Ceausescu during the Romanian Revolution. In his story on the incident that the AP published on December 26, 1989, he reported that he was shot three times, narrowly escaping death. One bullet grazed his skull, while two others hit his left arm. He wrote that he had left an embassy after filing his story via one of the few working telephone lines:

"What followed was a nightmare of running with nowhere to hide. Every turn in the strange city seemed to lead to another firefight. We tried to make our way back to the hotel, going in ever wider circles because of the fighting. Finally, luck ran out. Driving into an intersection, somebody flashed a light on us and shouted in Romanian. Before we could answer or get out of the car, I saw the flash of a gun and realized in an instant they were shooting at us. For what seemed like an eternity, we screamed that we were journalists."

He was eventually evacuated to Belgrade and, after recovering, went on to cover the wars in the former Yugoslavia, including the Siege of Sarajevo.

In 1993, Daniszewski became the AP's Southern Africa bureau chief based in Johannesburg, South Africa, where he led coverage of the end of apartheid and Nelson Mandela’s presidential campaign. He also covered the aftermaths of the Rwandan Civil War and the Angolan Civil War.

=== Los Angeles Times, (1996–2006) ===
Daniszewski joined the Los Angeles Times in 1996 as the Middle East bureau chief based in Cairo and reporting from across the region. In 2000, he became the newspaper’s Moscow bureau chief. He covered the immediate aftermath of the September 11 attacks in Pakistan, Afghanistan, and Iraq, and he stayed on the ground in Baghdad to report on the impact of the "shock and awe" bombardment of the city and the U.S.’s 2003 invasion of Iraq. He remained as the newspaper’s Baghdad bureau chief during the ensuing conflict and returned regularly after being named London bureau chief in 2004. Daniszewski was a member of the Los Angeles Times team that won an Overseas Press Club award and was named a finalist for a Pulitzer Prize in 2007 for its coverage of the Iraqi Civil War.

=== Associated Press (2006–present) ===
Daniszewski rejoined the Associated Press in 2006, serving as Vice President of International News in New York. He negotiated the opening of the AP’s Pyongyang bureau in 2012 and Myanmar bureau in 2013. Under his leadership, the AP won the 2016 Pulitzer Prize for Public Service and launched the AP’s Nerve Center. In this capacity, he oversaw more than 500 editors and reporters in close to 100 foreign bureaus. In 2013, he interviewed Russian President Vladimir Putin. He also handled the deaths and injuries of multiple journalists, including the wounding of Kathy Gannon and the deaths of Anja Niedringhaus, Simone Camilli and Ali Shehda Abu Afash.

In 2016, Daniszewski became the AP’s Vice President and Editor at Large for Standards, where he oversees standards around partnerships, fact-checking and trust-building.

During his second stint with the Associated Press, he became a board member of several journalism organizations and groups, including the Pulitzer Prize Board in 2014. In 2012, Daniszewski founded the International Press Institute North American Committee’s Foreign Editors’ Circle. In 2018, the International Press Institute appointed him as the organization's special representative for journalist safety. He is also an executive committee member of the ACOS (A Culture of Safety) Alliance, an organization dedicated to strengthening protection standards for freelancers. In 2008, he was a Sulzberger Executive Leadership Fellow at the Columbia University Graduate School of Journalism. He was named to the board of directors of the International Center for Journalists in 2018.

== Personal life ==
Daniszewski graduated from the Wharton School of the University of Pennsylvania in 1979. He was a Sulzberger Executive Leadership Fellow at the Columbia University Graduate School of Journalism in 2008.

He is married to Dru Menaker, the Chief Operating Officer of PEN America. They live in New York and have two adult children.
