= Leipziger Volkszeitung =

German newspaper

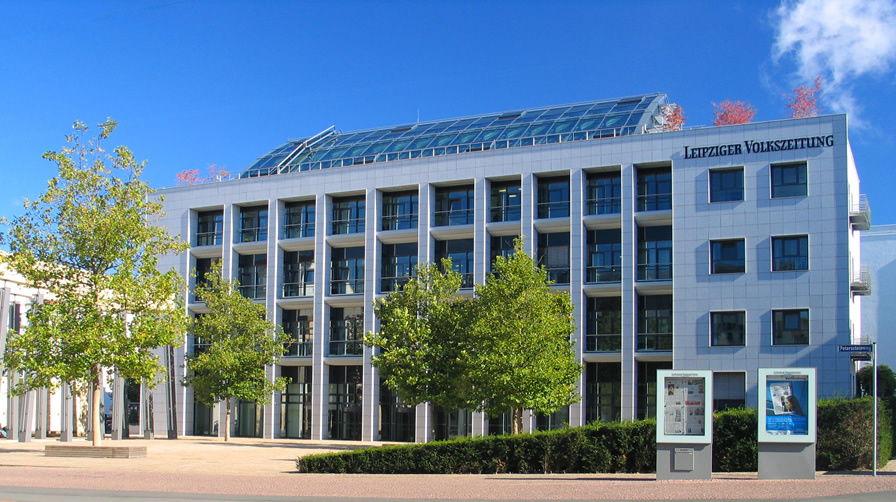
Leipziger Volkszeitung headquarters

The Leipziger Volkszeitung or LVZ (German for Leipzig People's Newspaper) is a daily regional newspaper in Leipzig and western Saxony, Germany. First published on 1 October 1894, the LVZ was formerly an important publication of the workers' movement and is currently the only local newspaper in Leipzig.

Existing in other nearby regions in various forms, the LVZ's circulation was 211,221 in the fourth quarter of 2011. It is owned by Madsack Group. The LVZ is published six times a week (Monday-Saturday) and is edited by Bernd Hilder.

== History and profile ==
The Leipziger Volkszeitung has a long connection with social democracy. From its first publication on 1 October 1894, with a circulation of 11,000 copies, it was a successor to the former newspaper Wähler (meaning Voter in English). Led by chief editor Bruno Schönlank, in the LVZ's early years it was edited and printed on Mittelstraße in Leipzig. From 1902 to 1907 Franz Mehring was editor, and from 1908 to 1913 Paul Lensch; at this time the LVZ (with a circulation of 53,000 in 1914) was the most important mouthpiece for the Social Democrat Party wing of Rosa Luxemburg. In 1917, following the division of the SPD, the newspaper came into the possession of the Independent Social Democratic Party of Germany (USPD). After the party's re-unification in 1922, the LVZ became an SPD mouthpiece once again, until it was banned by the National Socialists in 1933.

East German era's logo

Between 1946 and the mid-1950s, a new newspaper-printing house was built on the former site of the Leipziger Neuesten Nachrichten (Leipziger Latest News) which had been destroyed in World War II. This building was used by the LVZ, which functioned as an organ of the Socialist Unity Party from 19 May 1946 in western Saxony, later also north-west Saxony, until German reunification in 1989.

In 1991 the Leipziger Volkszeitung was sold by the East German Treuhand. Half was sold to Axel Springer AG, and half to Madsack (Hanover). During the third quarter of 1992 the circulation of the paper was 340,000 copies.

LVZ had a circulation of 305,000 copies in 2001. In October 2008 Springer began talks with Madsack, selling the LVZ as well as other regional titles (Ostsee-Zeitung, Lübecker Nachrichten and Kieler Nachrichten). The Madsack Group has owned 100% of the Leipziger Volkszeitung since 5 February 2009. The SPD's media group dd_vg owns 20.4% of the Madsack Group.

== Region of circulation ==
The LVZ is sold around Leipzig, in western, northern and central Saxony, and in the northern part of Altenburger Land in Thuringia. In some places outside Leipzig the newspaper's name is changed, as in Döbeln or Altenburg, but in other localities its name remains the Leipziger Volkszeitung with a local subtitle.

== Kunstpreis ==
On the occasion of its hundredth anniversary in 1994, the Leipziger Volkszeitung donated an art prize, which has been awarded every two years since 1995. It comes with prize money of 10,000 euros, an exhibition at the Museum of Fine Arts Leipzig and a catalog.

== Other versions ==
The "LVZ" is sold under a different name in:

Title	Area of circulation	Editor (January 2012)
Döbelner Allgemeine (Zeitung) (DA or DAZ)	Döbeln	Björn Meine
Oschatzer Allgemeine (OAZ)	Altkreis Oschatz	Hagen Rösner
Torgauer Zeitung (TZ)	Torgau	Thomas Stöber
Osterländer Volkszeitung (OVZ)	Altenburg	Günther Neumann
Dresdner Neueste Nachrichten (DNN)	Dresden	Dirk Birgel

In the following regions, it is sold as the Leipziger Volkszeitung plus a subtitle:

Title	Area of circulation	Editor (January 2012)
Delitzsch-Eilenburger Kreiszeitung	Delitzsch/Eilenburg	Frank Pfütze
Muldentalzeitung	Grimma/Wurzen	Thomas Müller
Borna-Geithainer Zeitung	Borna/Geithain	Frank Prenzel
