= Ostsee-Zeitung =

German regional daily newspaper

- Type: Daily newspaper
- Format: Rheinisch
- Owner(s): Lübecker Nachrichten GmbH
- Publisher: Ostsee-Zeitung publishing house
- Founded: 1952; 73 years ago
- Language: German
- Headquarters: Rostock
- Website: OZ

The Ostsee-Zeitung (abbreviated OZ) is a German language regional daily newspaper published in Rostock, Germany. It was launched in East Germany in 1952 and has been in circulation since then.

== History and profile ==
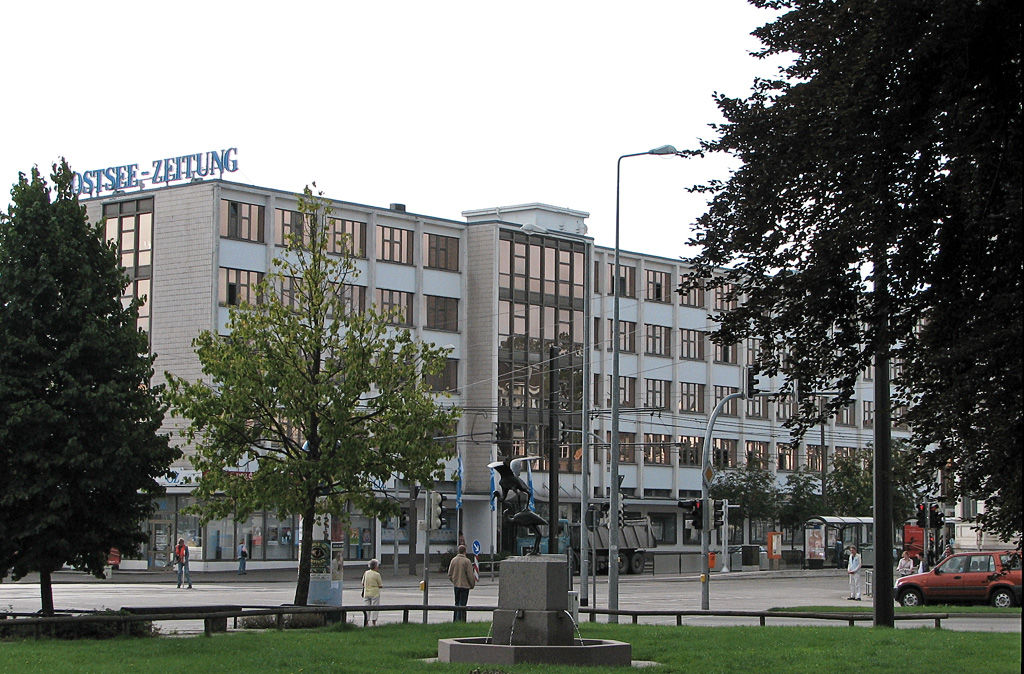
Ostsee-Zeitung HQ in Rostock, Mecklenburg

Founded in 1952, Ostsee-Zeitung was one of the newspapers published in East Germany before the German reunification. The paper was owned the Socialist Unity Party during this period. As of 1959 the paper had thirteen local editions. The paper is based in Rostock and is published in Rheinisch format.

Ostsee-Zeitung was part of the Ostsee-Zeitung GmbH, a subsidiary of the Axel Springer group, until 2008. The group acquired the shares in the paper in 1990. The Lübecker Nachrichten GmbH, a subsidiary of the Madsack group, bought the Ostsee-Zeitung GmbH in February 2009. The Ostsee-Zeitung GmbH is a subsidiary of the Lübecker Nachrichten GmbH. The Madsack group also owns Freie Presse, Göttinger Tageblatt, Hannoversche Allgemeine Zeitung, Kieler Nachrichten, Leipziger Volkszeitung, and Lübecker Nachrichten.

The publisher of Ostsee-Zeitung is the Ostsee Zeitung publishing house. The paper has ten local editions.

Ostsee-Zeitung is regarded as part of the regional identity of Mecklenburg-Vorpommern.

== Circulation ==
The circulation of Ostsee-Zeitung was 232,100 copies in the mid-1990s before the unification. In 2001 the paper sold 191,000 copies. Its circulation was 181,046 copies in the second quarter of 2003.
