= Sruthi Gottipati =

Journalist

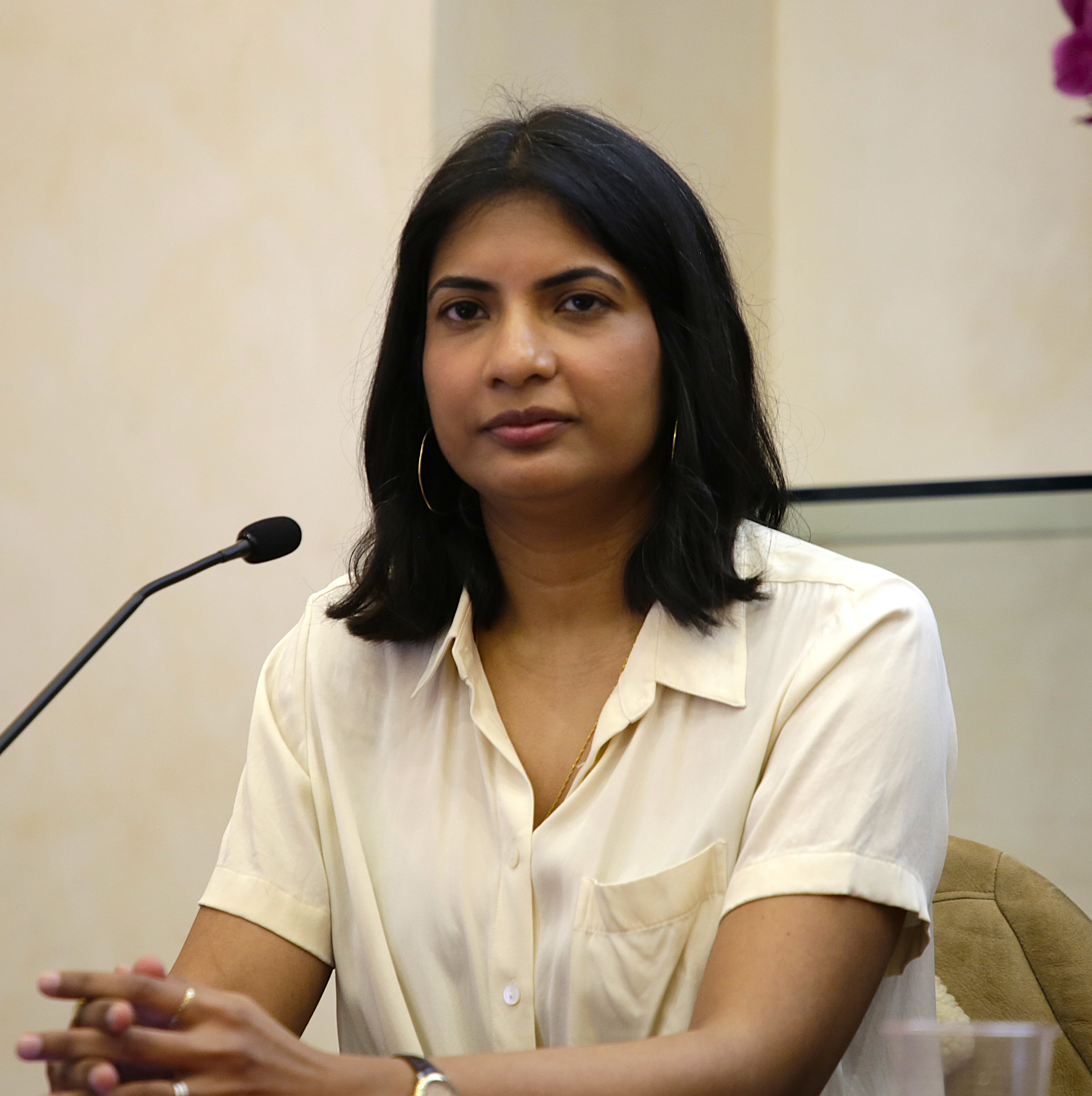
- Gottipati at the International Journalism Festival in 2026

Sruthi Gottipati is an independent journalist and editor of Indian origin, based in Paris. She is also a teacher at Sciences Po’s journalism school where she teaches reporting, writing and editing.

Gottipati started as an India reporter for Thomson Reuters based in New Delhi. She later worked for the New York Times She wrote for many mainstream media outlets including NYT, International Herald Tribune, France24.com, the Guardian and Al Jazeera.

In 2017, she built Brut India, an English language social media platform and started Spot On, a public interest news site, in May 2025.

She was awarded fellowships from IWMF and IRP to cover underreported news from Africa and Latin America.
