= In Berlin (Bonnie Tyler album) =

Live album by Bonnie Tyler
- Released: 19 April 2024
- Recorded: 8 May 2019
- Venue: Admiralspalast, Berlin
- Length: 79:43
- Label: earMUSIC

Bonnie Tyler chronology
The Best Is Yet to Come (2021)	In Berlin (2024)

Singles from In Berlin
- 1. "Faster Than the Speed of Night" Released: 22 March 2024; 2. "Let's Go Crazy Tonight" Released: 12 April 2024; 3. "Bad for Loving You" Released: 26 July 2024; 4. "The Best" Released: 31 August 2024; 5. "Older" Released: 11 October 2024

In Berlin is the third and final live album by Welsh singer Bonnie Tyler before her death in 2026. It was released on 19 April 2024 by earMUSIC. The album was recorded during her concert as part of the Between the Earth and the Stars Live Tour at the Admiralspalast in Berlin on 8 May 2019, with the set list including songs from her albums Natural Force (1978), Faster Than the Speed of Night (1983), Secret Dreams and Forbidden Fire (1986), Hide Your Heart (1988), Rocks and Honey (2013), and Between the Earth and the Stars (2019). The album failed to chart worldwide.

== Background and release ==
Tyler announced plans to release a live album in March 2020. Two concerts from her Between the Earth and the Stars Live Tour were recorded; the 20 May show at L'Olympia in Paris was filmed and released as a concert film through Canal+ in 2020. In Berlin was originally set for release on 5 April 2024, but its release date was delayed by three weeks.

The album was formally announced on 21 March 2024. "Faster Than the Speed of Night" was released as the first single on 22 March 2024. "Let's Go Crazy Tonight" and "Bad for Loving You" followed as the second and third singles on 12 April and 25 July, respectively.

Tyler described the release as "bittersweet" because In Berlin was recorded "not long before the pandemic started". She described the concert as "a great show [and] a great night". She later expressed that she felt the audience sounded too quiet in the final mix of the recording.

== Critical reception ==
Professional ratings
Review scores
Source	Rating
Spill	4.5/5 stars

Writing for The Spill Magazine, Aaron Badgley commended Tyler's ability to "present herself and her music in a very different light on stage", concluding that In Berlin is "further proof of her incredible ability to touch souls with her songs and voice". musikmag.de described In Berlin as a collection of "well-crafted" rock, pop and blues songs. Hans Korte of pop-himmel.de viewed the album as "an excellent live document that impressively demonstrates [Tyler's] versatility".

== Track listing ==
Disc One
No.	Title	Writer(s)	Origin	Length
1.	"Flat on the Floor"	Ashley Monroe; Brett James	Rocks and Honey	5:01
2.	"Hold On"	Kevin Dunne; David Mackay	Between the Earth and the Stars	4:11
3.	"It's a Heartache"	Ronnie Scott; Steve Wolfe	Natural Force	5:01
4.	"Seven Waves Away"	Barry Gibb; Stephen Gibb; Ashley Gibb; Doug Emery	Between the Earth and the Stars	4:50
5.	"Have You Ever Seen the Rain?"	John Fogerty	Faster Than the Speed of Night	4:41
6.	"Move"	Tom E Morrison; Rachel Morrison	Between the Earth and the Stars	4:22
7.	"This Is Gonna Hurt"	Kurt Allison; Kelly Archer; David Fanning	Rocks and Honey	3:35
8.	"Let's Go Crazy Tonight"	Ron Beckett; Bob Huff; Richard Klender; Ted Winchester; Mackay	Between the Earth and the Stars	4:12
9.	"Bad for Loving You"	Amy Wadge; Martie Maguire	Between the Earth and the Stars	3:26
Total length:				38:19

Disc Two
No.	Title	Writer(s)	Origin	Length
1.	"Total Eclipse of the Heart"	Jim Steinman	Faster Than the Speed of Night	7:37
2.	"Between the Earth and the Stars"	John David; Richard Wold	Between the Earth and the Stars	4:31
3.	"Faster Than the Speed of Night"	Steinman	Faster Than the Speed of Night	6:43
4.	"Turtle Blues"	Janis Joplin	Hide Your Heart	7:12
5.	"Slow Walk"	Brian Cadd; John Beland	Between the Earth and the Stars	4:00
6.	"The Best"	Mike Chapman; Holly Knight	Hide Your Heart	4:51
7.	"Holding Out for a Hero"	Steinman; Dean Pitchford	Secret Dreams and Forbidden Fire	4:18
8.	"Older"	Wadge	Between the Earth and the Stars	3:52
Total length:				42:04

== Personnel ==
Credits adapted from liner notes.

=== Musicians ===
- Bonnie Tyler – lead vocals
- Matt Prior – guitar
- Ed Poole – bass guitar
- John Young – keyboard
- Alex Toff – drums

=== Technical ===
- Matthew Davis – management
- Stefan Lange – tour management
- Jörg Lengauer – tour manager
- Eike Freese – mastering, mixing
- Benjamin Lawrenz – recording
- Denny Meissner – recording
- Tom E Morrison – Front of House engineer
- Volker Pöckel – monitor engineer
- Mark Scrimshaw – lighting designer
- Michael Staps – technical director
- Dennis Dackweiler – sound technician
- Johannes Heinicke – light technician
- Daniel Kick – backliner
- Laurin Halberstadt – assistant engineering
- Alexander Mertsch – design, photography
- Michael Liebchen – catering
- Christian Liebchen – catering
- Stuart Hughes – merchandising
- Markus Schorn – truck driver
- Stefan Kürsten – bus driver

== Release history ==
In Berlin release history
Region	Date	Format(s)	Label	Ref.
Worldwide	19 April 2024	Digital download; streaming	earMUSIC	
Various	19 April 2024	CD	earMUSIC	
Various	26 April 2024	CD	earMUSIC	
Canada	3 May 2024	CD	earMUSIC	
