= Lynsey Addario =

American photojournalist (born 1973)

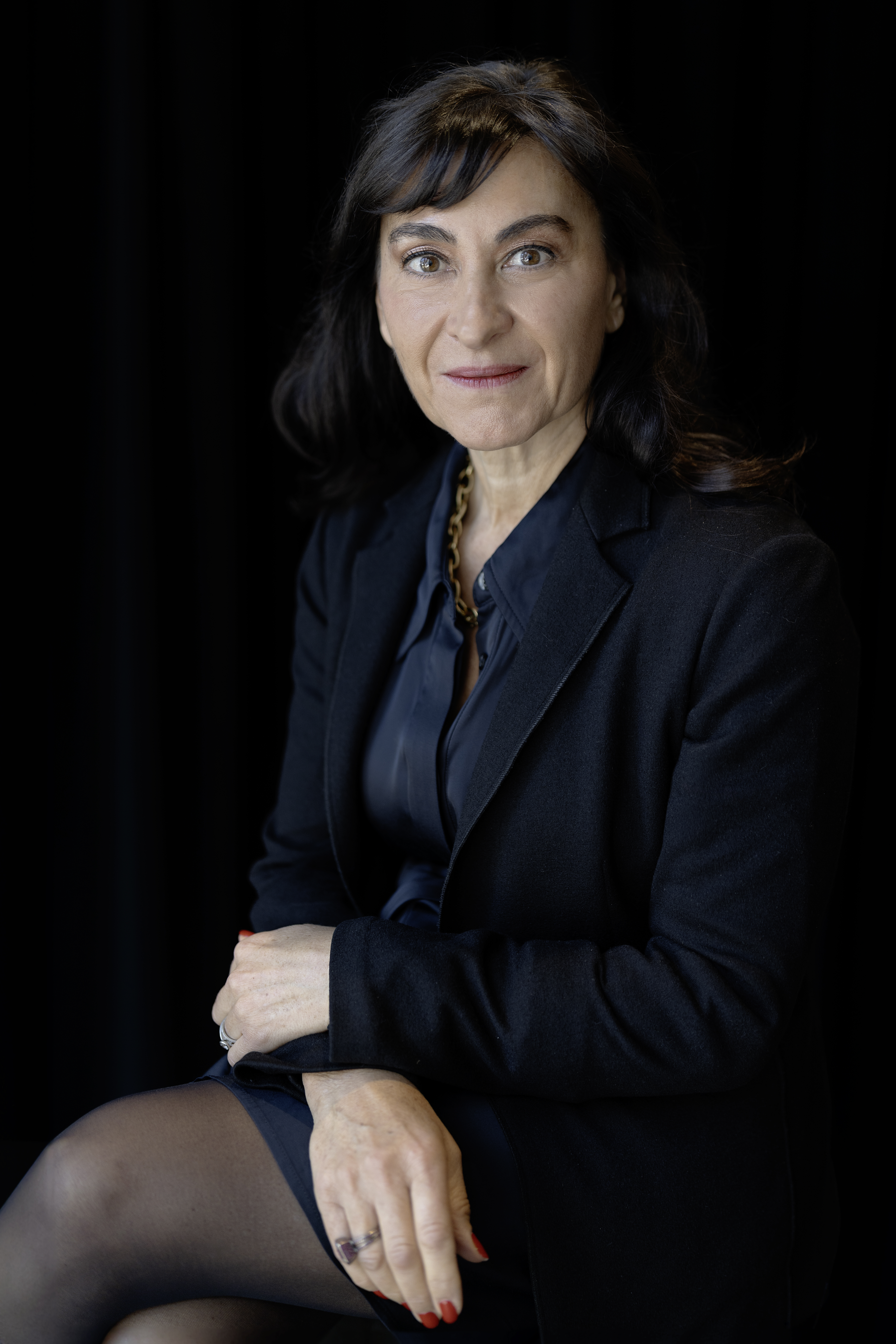
- Lynsey Addario photographed in 2026
- Born: 1973 (age 52–53); Westport, Connecticut, U.S.
- Education: University of Wisconsin–Madison
- Occupation: Photojournalist
- Spouse: Paul de Bendern
- Awards: MacArthur Fellowship

Lynsey Addario (born 1973) is an American photojournalist. Her work often focuses on conflicts and human rights issues, especially the role of women in traditional societies. In 2022, she received a Courage in Journalism Award from the International Women's Media Foundation.

== Life and work ==
Lynsey Addario was born and raised in Westport, Connecticut, to parents Camille and Phillip Addario, both Italian-American hairdressers. She graduated from Staples High School, in Westport in 1991 and from the University of Wisconsin–Madison in 1995. She also holds two Honorary Doctorate Degrees, one from the University of Wisconsin-Madison in Humanities, and another from Bates College in Maine.

Addario began photographing professionally with the Buenos Aires Herald in Argentina in 1996 with, as she says, "no previous photographic training". In the late 1990s, she moved back to the United States and freelanced for the Associated Press in New York City, only to move back to South America less than one year later. Focusing on Cuba and the effect of communism on the public, Addario made a name for herself. She moved to India a few years later to photograph for the Associated Press, leaving the United States.

While living in India, Addario traveled through Nepal, Afghanistan, and Pakistan, focusing on humanitarian and women's issues. After the attacks on the World Trade Center in 2001, Addario resolved to photograph Afghanistan and Pakistan under the Taliban.

In 2003 and 2004, Addario photographed the Iraq war in Baghdad for The New York Times. She has since covered conflicts in Afghanistan, Iraq, Darfur, Republic of the Congo, Haiti, and Ukraine. She has covered stories throughout the Middle East and Africa. In August 2004 she turned her attention to Africa, focusing on Chad and Sudan.

She has photographed for The Atlantic, The New York Times, The New York Times Magazine, Time, Newsweek, and National Geographic.

In Pakistan on May 9, 2009, Addario was involved in an automobile accident while returning to Islamabad from an assignment at a refugee camp. Her collarbone was broken, another journalist was injured, and the driver was killed.

Addario was one of four New York Times journalists who were missing in Libya from March 16–21, 2011. The New York Times reported on March 18, 2011, that Libya had agreed to free her and three colleagues: Anthony Shadid, Stephen Farrell and Tyler Hicks. The Libyan government released the four journalists on March 21, 2011. She reports that she was threatened with death and repeatedly groped during her captivity by the Libyan Army.

In November 2011, The New York Times wrote a letter of complaint on behalf of Addario to the Israeli government, after allegations that Israeli soldiers at the Erez Crossing had strip-searched and mocked her and forced her to go through an X-ray scanner three times despite knowing that she was pregnant. Addario reported that she had "never, ever been treated with such blatant cruelty." The Israeli Defence ministry subsequently issued an apology to both Addario and The New York Times.

The extensive exhibition 'In Afghanistan' at the Nobel Peace Center in Oslo, Norway has her photos of Afghan women juxtaposed with Tim Hetherington's photographs from American soldiers in the Korangal Valley.

Addario's bodies of work include "Finding Home" a year-long documentary following three Syrian refugee families and their stateless newborns over the course of one year as they await asylum in Europe for Time, The Changing Face of Saudi Women for National Geographic and "The Displaced" for The New York Times Magazine, a reportage documenting the lives of three children displaced from war in Syria, Ukraine, and South Sudan. Addario spent four years documenting the plight of Syrian refugees in Jordan, Lebanon, Turkey, and Iraq for The New York Times, and she has covered the civil war in South Sudan, and Maternal Mortality in Assam, India, and Sierra Leone for Time. In 2015, Addario published her memoir It's What I Do: A Photographer's Life of Love and War and Warner Bros bought the rights to a movie based on the memoir, to be directed by Steven Spielberg and to star Jennifer Lawrence as Addario. She also released a photography book in October 2018 titled "Of Love and War."

In March 2022, Addario covered the Russian war in Ukraine on behalf of the New York Times. While reporting from Irpin adjacent to Kyiv, Addario photographed a Russian mortar attack on evacuating civilians. The incident was also filmed by Andriy Dubchak, working freelance for the New York Times. They witnessed the Russian forces adjust their mortar fire directly at the civilians and then a mortar round exploded about 20 meters away from the journalists. In the immediate aftermath, Addario took a photo of a group of four victims. A mother and two children were killed and a man accompanying them was seriously injured and later died. She said that the photo is historically important "[b]ecause it's a war crime. And it's happening." The photo was published on the front page of the newspaper on March 7. A few days later, the woman who was killed was identified, and her children who died were her 18-year-old son and 9-year-old daughter. A volunteer with a religious organization that had been assisting the family was also killed. The woman was an employee of SE Ranking, a software company with offices in London and California.

== Impact on Gender Representation through Photographing Conflict ==
Addario has highlighted gender representation through photographing conflict throughout her career. She most commonly photographed the lives of ordinary women and children, typically in times of conflict. Some of the most dangerous, powerful, and controversial topics that Addario has covered were when she was documenting the lives of women in Afghanistan. Addario showed maternal mortality, women's participation in elections, women's difficulty navigating bad marriages, and women protesting by means of self-immolation.

Addario's series 29 minutes, captures the human costs of war. She also researched maternal mortality, documenting some real and raw experiences of young women facing dangerous pregnancies. Because of Addario's photographs surrounding maternal mortality, the Merck corporation started making significant donations and contributions to global maternal mortality efforts. More recently, Addario has photographed war in Ukraine, covering women and children having to flee the wartime.

== Family ==
Addario married Paul de Bendern, a journalist with Reuters, in July 2009. They have two children.

== Publications by Addario ==
- It's What I Do: A Photographer's Life of Love and War. New York: Penguin, 2015. ISBN 978-1594205378.
- Of Love & War. New York: Penguin, 2018. ISBN 9780525560029.

== Awards ==
- 2002: Infinity Award from the International Center of Photography.
- 2008: Getty Images Grant for Editorial photography for her work in Darfur.
- 2009: MacArthur Fellowship from the John D. and Catherine T. MacArthur Foundation.
- 2009: Pulitzer Prize for International Reporting, part of which was for her work in Waziristan.
- 2015: American Photo Magazine named Addario one of the five most influential photographers of the past 25 years, writing that "Addario changed the way we saw the world’s conflicts."
- 2017: Golden Plate Award from the American Academy of Achievement.
- 2018: Emmy Award nomination for 'Finding Home', with a team of others, for Time
- 2019: Honorary Doctorate from the University of York
- 2020: Induction into the International Photography Hall of Fame and Museum
- 2021: First Place, Magazine Photojournalist of the Year, Best of Photojournalism Winners, National Press Photographers Association (NPPA)
- 2022, Courage in Journalism Award, International Women's Media Foundation.
- 2023: George Polk Award in Photojournalism for iconic photo of family slain fleeing Ukraine.
