= Fatima Al-Zahra'a Shbair =

Palestinian photojournalist

- Born: 1997 (age 28–29)
- Education: Al-Azhar University
- Known for: Photojournalist
- Awards: A World Press Photo Award

Fatima Al-Zahra'a Shbair is a Palestinian photojournalist based in Gaza City, Palestine. She won a Prix de la Ville de Perpignan Rémi Ochlik award by Visa pour l'image in 2021 and a World Press Photo award in 2022.

== Life and work ==
Shbair is a self-taught photographer born in Gaza in 1997. She studied business administration at Al-Azhar University. Her work focuses on documenting the Palestinian - Israeli conflict in Gaza City. Shbair's work has been published by many international publications including The New York Times, The Guardian, Le Figaro, L'Express and Le Temps.

== Awards ==
- 2017 : Photo Documentary Grand Prix, National Geographic Moments
- 2021 : Prix de la Ville de Perpignan Rémi Ochlik
- 2021 : IWMF 2021 Anja Niedringhaus Courage in Photojournalism Award
- 2021 : TIME's Top 100 Photos of 2021
- 2022 : World Press Photo, Regional winner (Asia), Singles

== Group exhibition ==
- National Geographic in Dubai 2017
