= South America Tour =

2022 concert tour by Bonnie Tyler

- Continental tour by Bonnie Tyler
- Promotional poster
- Location: South America
- Start date: 4 November 2022
- End date: 30 November 2022
- No. of shows: 9

Bonnie Tyler concert chronology
- Between the Earth and the Stars Live Tour (2019); South America Tour (2022); 40 Years "Total Eclipse of the Heart" Tour (2023–2024)

The South America Tour was a concert tour by Welsh singer Bonnie Tyler. It took place in November 2022 and featured Tyler's first ever concerts in Brazil and Uruguay. The tour was originally scheduled for May 2020, but was postponed twice due to the COVID-19 pandemic.

== Background ==
The tour was originally scheduled for May 2020, but was postponed due to the COVID-19 pandemic.

== Critical reception ==
Gean Zanelato of HC Notícias described Tyler's performance in Tubarão as "electrifying" and noted that she was "full of energy". Following her concert in Curitiba, Giselle Ulbrich of ric.com.br stated that Tyler "thrilled her fans with her vibrant energy, lots of charisma and greatest hits". Carolina Pessoni of a redação stated that Tyler "rocked the place to the sound of classics from the 70s, 80s and 90s, as well as new songs" during her sold-out show in Goiânia.

== Tour dates ==
South America Tour
Date	City	Country	Venue
4 November 2022	Tubarão	Brazil	Arena Multiuso
5 November 2022	Florianópolis	Brazil	Hard Rock Live
11 November 2022	Curitiba	Brazil	Teatro Positivo
12 November 2022	São Paulo	Brazil	Tokio Marine Hall
18 November 2022	Porto Alegre	Brazil	Araújo Vianna Auditorium
19 November 2022	Rio de Janeiro	Brazil	Jeunesse Arena
26 November 2022	Goiânia	Brazil	Goiânia Arena
27 November 2022	Salvador	Brazil	Concha Acústica
30 November 2022	Montevideo	Uruguay	Sodre National Auditorium
