= Devilish Presley =

English gothabilly band

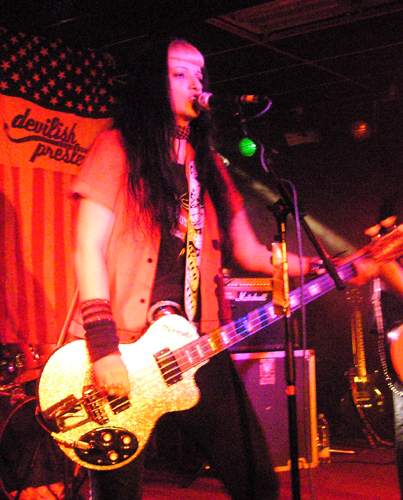
- Devilish Presley 2010

Background information
- Origin: London, England
- Genres: Gothabilly; psychobilly; gothic rock; punk rock
- Years active: 2002–2015
- Label: November Tenth
- Members: Jacqui Vixen; Johnny Navarro
- Past members: Ragborn Rosy; Pete Vincent

Devilish Presley are an English gothabilly band from London, England.

== History ==
A gothabilly band that formed in East London in 2002, they released six albums on their own label November Tenth Records and toured for eleven years in the UK and Europe. In 2004–2005 Devilish Presley were the house band at the London club Dead and Buried, run by DJ Cavey Nik.

=== Memphisto, tours and publishing deal ===
2005 saw the release of the Memphisto album. Among bands they supported were The Damned, The Misfits, The Meteors, The Horrorpops, The 5.6.7.8's, Marky Ramone, Jayne County, The Vibrators. In 2006 they signed to the Wipe Out Music publishing company, (who now publish the drummerless duo Sleaford Mods). The band toured Europe and played in Germany, France, the Netherlands, Poland, Slovakia, Belfast and on 31 October 2005 in Dublin where they performed at Tower Records and Whelan's (music venue).

The single Hammer Horror Glamour (2005 from the Memphisto album) was featured on several cover-mount CDs including Big Cheese magazine (UK) and Zillo (Germany). The Memphisto album became available on iTunes in September 2006. Halloween Queen the follow-up single to Hammer Horror Glamour was made available on iTunes in March 2007 and the band played a 25 date Halloween Queen UK tour – the only one using a live drummer – Ragborn Rosy. After parting company with their drummer the band continued as a two-piece with a drum machine. In August 2007 another UK tour began taking in 22 dates. Support slots on this tour included The Meteors, The Peacocks, Demented Are Go, King Kurt, and several dates with Canadian band The Creepshow.

=== Flesh Ride ===
More European dates in Germany and Poland were followed by another UK tour to promote Voodoo Goddess the first track taken from Flesh Ride (their fourth album). A promotional video for track was made in a Kings Cross pub (The Cross Kings). In May 2008 Johnny Navarro played guitar for P.Paul Fenech (The Meteors) when he undertook a European solo tour in Germany, Italy, and London. In August the band announced their new album "Flesh Ride" would be released on 31 October and would contain 15 tracks – as with "Memphisto" the cover photo was taken by Finnish born photographer Tina Korhonen. In November 2008 the band played in Europe again including a gigs in Warsaw and Bucharest. In December 2008 the band were the UK tour support for The Damned on 19 dates around the country including the O2 Academy Islington.

=== 2009 – 2010: UK tour promoting live DVD ===
The band toured the UK in March and April 2009 to promote their Flesh Ride album. At one of these dates in Birmingham on 3 April – a live DVD was filmed. Entitled Live Voodoo it became the band's debut DVD. To promote the DVD (released on 15 June) a short UK tour took place throughout June. The DVD has since sold out. The band confirmed in early 2010 that Jacqui Vixen had been forced to quit playing the bass due to an RSI Repetitive strain injury she had been suffering from for some time. The problem began after a fall whilst on tour in Germany in 2008 and her style of playing (all down strokes) had aggravated the condition. Prior to the recording of the fifth album The Dark Triad Vixen began taking vocal coaching under the tutelage of Stevie Vann and took over the role of lead vocalist. The band took a break from touring in 2010 and only played a few shows with temporary bass player Pete Vincent including The Rock & Blues Custom Show in Derbyshire and dates in Poland and Switzerland.

=== 2011: UK tour ===
In January 2011, the band finished mixing their fifth album at Berry Street Studio with Kevin Poree (Memphisto) producing. A UK Tour also began in January and the album titled The Dark Triad was released on CD and all major digital outlets on 9 May 2011, it was the third album to feature a cover picture by photographer Tina Korhonen. On 7 February the band released a direct to download single "The Beast Must Die" c/w "Cocaine Joe" both taken from their forthcoming album. A promotional Video Single for the song was released the same day on YouTube. The video was made by Luke Billing for Berry Street Studio video productions and was filmed at Murder Mile Studio in London. On 31 October 2011 the band released I Created A Monster.

On 26 March 2012 the band released "The Devil Rock & Roll" and they did a short UK tour to promote it and played their final gig in Corby on Saturday 21 April 2012 supporting Vice Squad. On 11 June 2012 the band released a fourth Video Single entitled Blood From The Mummy's Tomb the final video made by Luke Billing for Berry Street Studio video productions. In July 2012 Vixen and Navarro left London and took a two year break, during which time Johnny Navarro wrote a novel Kill Devil Delta a fictionalised account of his time in the band.

=== 2014: The Electric Ballroom ===
Devilish Presley's fans crowdfunded the recording of a sixth studio album, 'The Electric Ballroom'. The album was recorded at Goldmaster Allstars with producer Kevin Poree and co-producer Zac Dorne. It was released in May 2015.

=== 2015: Farewell UK tour ===
After a lay off of over three years the band returned to the live stage for a farewell tour and to promote The Electric Ballroom and Johnny's novel Kill Devil Delta including a London show on 10 October at London's Pipeline Club. The final release on their November Tenth Records label was a Limited Edition 4GB Memory Stick containing all six of their albums, plus photos, lyrics and memorabilia.

=== 2026: Solo project ===
In 2026 Navarro created a solo project called Aliens See Dinosaurs, and will be releasing an album The Shining Wire in May.

== Discography ==
Studio albums

- Rust Garden (2003)
- Disgraceland (2004)
- Memphisto (2006)
- Flesh Ride (2008)
- The Dark Triad (2011)
- The Electric Ballroom (2015)
- Gothabilly (2020) (Compilation)

Singles

- "Black Leather Jesus" c/w "Levis Dog" (2003)
- "Memento Mori" c/w "Saturday Night Satellite" (2004)
- "She's Not America" (2005)
- "Hammer Horror Glamour" (2006)
- "Halloween Queen" (2007)
- "Voodoo Goddess" c/w "Losing Ground" (2008)
- "The Beast Must Die" c/w "Cocaine Joe" (2011)
- "I Created A Monster" (2011)
- "The Devil Rock & Roll" c/w "Spiritbabe" c/w "Mary Shelley Motorcade" (2012)
- "Blood From The Mummy's Tomb" c/w "Dreamers & Destroyers" c/w "Mr Splitfoot" (2012)
- "The Zombie I Love" c/w "Creature In The Shadows" c/w "The Serpent Henry" (2012)

Compilations

- Pagan Love Songs (Germany) (2004)
- Dark Awakenings Vol 3 (Germany) (2006)
- Screaming Tarts Vol 3 (UK) (2006)

Cover-mount CDs

- Kaleidoscope Magazine (UK) (2005)
- Zillo Magazine (Germany) (2005)
- Sonic Seducer Magazine (Germany) (2006)
- Big Cheese Magazine (UK) (2006)
- Devolution Magazine (UK) (2010)
- Big Cheese Magazine (UK) (2010)
- Devolution Magazine (UK) (2011)

DVDs

- Live Voodoo (2009)
- The Beast Must Die - Ltd Edition (2011)
