= Kathy Gannon =

Canadian journalist

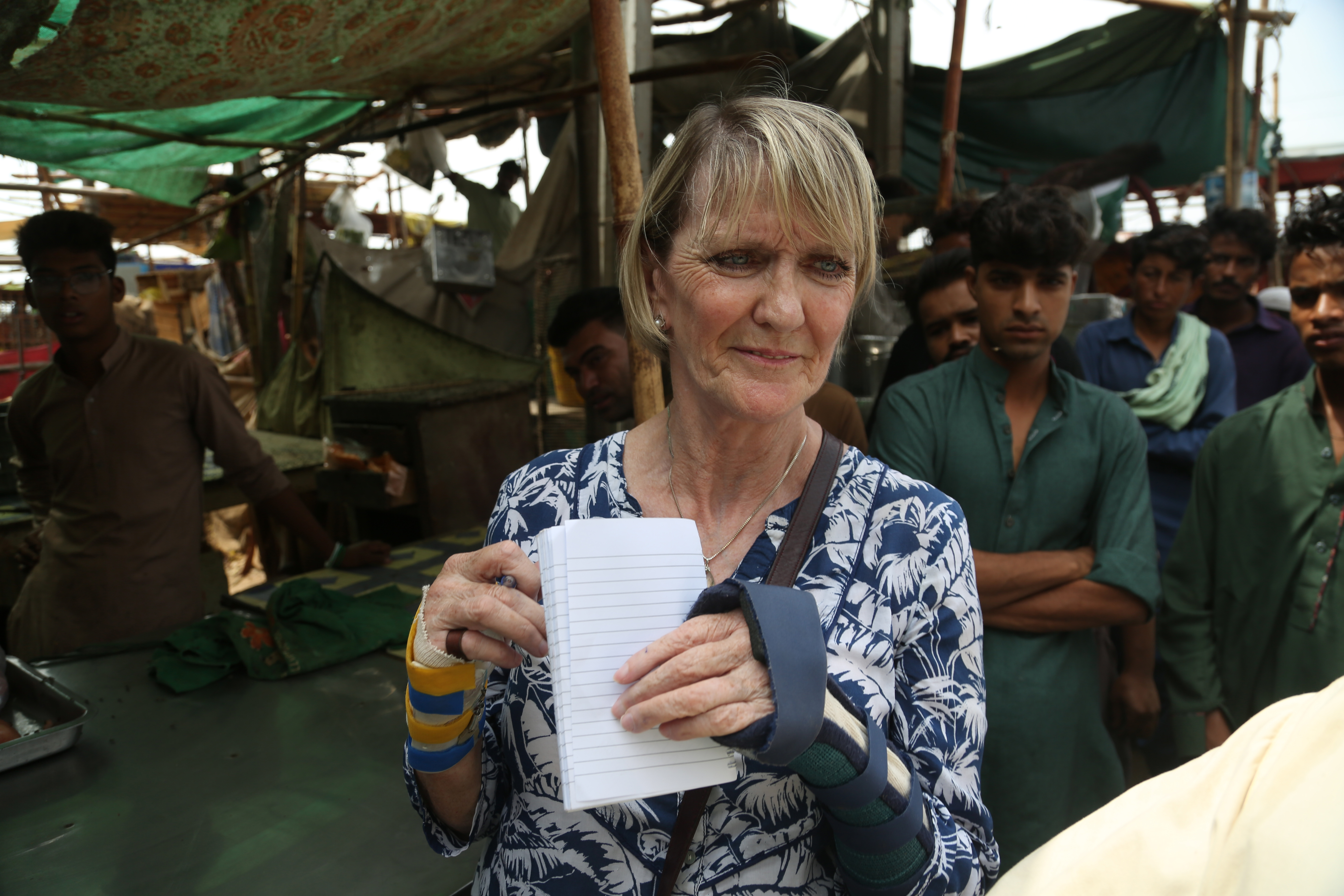
- Born: 1954 (age 71–72); Timmins, Ontario
- Occupation: Journalist
- Website: kathy-gannon.com

Kathy M. Gannon (born 1954) is a Canadian journalist and news director of the Associated Press for Afghanistan and Pakistan. In 2014, Gannon was attacked and wounded while reporting from Afghanistan. Her German colleague, Anja Niedringhaus, was mortally wounded. Gannon received extensive coverage as she struggled to recover from her wounds and return to war reporting.

== Biography ==
Gannon was born in Timmins, Ontario, the youngest of six children.

Gannon was a freelance journalist in Israel before 1988, when she began reporting on Afghanistan and Pakistan. Her early reporting focused on the mujahedeen during the Soviet-Afghan war. She remained in the country until September 2001, when, following the 9/11 attacks, the Taliban forced all foreigners to leave the country. She returned by October 23, 2001, where she was "the only Western journalist to see the last weeks of Taliban rule". By 2014, Gannon had spent 18 years reporting from Afghanistan and was the Associated Press's regional chief.

In 2005, she published the non-fiction book I is for Infidel: From Holy War to Holy Terror in Afghanistan.

=== 2014 attack ===
On 14 April 2014, Gannon and AP photographer Anja Niedringhaus were in a convoy of journalists near Khost, reporting on the national elections, protected by elements of the Afghan National Army and Police. When the vehicles were stopped, one of the commanders, named Naqibullah, of the police contingent took his rifle, yelled "Allahu Akbar!", and fired into their vehicle at close range. He then sat down and surrendered to his colleagues. Gannon was rushed to a hospital in Khost, where she underwent an emergency operation which saved her life. The attacker offered mixed explanations for his motive, saying he was “not a normal person.” He was found guilty by a court in July 2014 and set to be executed, reduced to 20 years in prison on appeal.

Following the attack, Gannon underwent 18 surgeries (14 in 2014 alone) to repair the damage caused by the seven bullets which hit her, which especially damaged her left arm and hand.

=== Later career ===
Gannon returned to journalism two years after the attack, working for eight more years before retiring in 2022. In 2020, she was named news director for Afghanistan and Pakistan. In 2023 the 'CFWIJ Kathy Gannon Legacy Award' was established by the Coalition For Women in Journalism.

== Personal life ==
Gannon is married to Pakistani architect Naeem Pasha.

== Awards and honours ==
- 2002 Courage in Journalism Award, International Women's Media Foundation
- Edward R. Murrow Press Fellowship (2003), Council on Foreign Relations
- 2014 Tara Singh Hayer memorial award, Canadian Journalists for Free Expression
- 2015 McGill Medal for Journalistic Courage, the Henry W. Grady College of Journalism and Mass Communication
- 2015 Tully Free Speech Award, Syracuse University
- 2021 Award for Reporting, American Academy of Diplomacy
- 2022 Columbia Journalism Award, Columbia University
- 2025 Asper Fellowship in Media, Western University
