= Claudia Duque =

Colombia journalist and human rights defender

Claudia Julieta Duque
- Born: Pereira, Colombia
- Occupations: Journalist; Human rights defender
- Years active: 1990s–present
- Awards: RSF-Sweden Press Freedom Award; IWMF Courage in Journalism Award; Ilaria Alpi Award

Claudia Julieta Duque is a Colombian journalist and human rights defender. In 2011, Newsweek magazine ranked her among the ten female journalists most at risk to their lives from their reporting.

== Biography ==
Claudia Duque is a correspondent for the Colombian human rights radio station Radio Nizkor, a network member of Forbidden Stories' Safebox Network, and was previously a researcher for the Lawyers' Collective José Alvear Restrepo (CCAJAR). She also worked with and for various well-known news agencies and organizations, such as The Washington Post and UNICEF and the Colombian newspapers El Spectador and El Tiempo. Over the course of her journalism career, she has specialized in investigating and reporting on high-profile cases, such as enforced disappearance, forced recruitment of children by legal and illegal armed groups, the consequences of impunity and the right to justice, and infiltration of paramilitary groups into government institutions. Her investigations have often led to lawsuits against members of the military, politicians, and members of the legal community; and even journalists for their involvement in criminal acts.

=== Research on Jaime Garzón's murder ===
In 2001, Duque, together with CCAJAR, investigated the circumstances under which fellow journalist Jaime Garzón was murdered in 1999. The investigation revealed that operatives of the Colombian intelligence service, Departamento Administrativo de Seguridad (DAS), were involved in a cover-up to mislead the Attorney General's investigation.

From 2001 to 2004, Duque was systematically subjected to death threats, kidnappings, illegal surveillance, smear campaigns, and stigmatization. The government had provided her with protection, but Duque suspected that some of her bodyguards were spies. These suspicions were confirmed when internal reports revealed that her bodyguards had informed the DAS about her activities and also made false accusations against her. From 2004 to 2008, Duque and her daughter lived in exile. In part due to Duque's publications, the DAS was dissolved in 2011.

In March 2013, Duque announced a lawsuit against DAS officials for psychological torture. Two ex-DAS officials—suspects in the case— were arrested in 2016. This is the first case in the world where the criminal justice system identified alleged perpetrators responsible for criminal psychological torture. The hearing of this case by the Bogotá Court began in early December 2018. In the same year, Duque also filed a formal complaint with the Inter-American Commission on Human Rights (IACHR) against the Colombian government for alleged human rights violations against her and her daughter.

Duque continues to receive protection for intimidation and harassment. In 2009, the IACHR announced precautionary measures for Duque and her daughter. From 2003 she was accompanied intermittently by Peace Brigades International (PBI), and from 2010 on an official basis. For safety reasons, she was forced to leave Colombia several times. In 2018, she went into hiding in Deventer, Netherlands, through the Shelter City program, which provides temporary shelter, training, and protection to human rights defenders who fight rights violations in their home countries.

== Awards ==
Duque has received many awards for her journalistic work, including the Press Freedom Award from Swedish Reporters Without Borders, the Courage in Journalism Award (2010) from the International Women's Media Foundation (IWMF) and the Ilaria Alpi Award in Italy in 2010. She was also given an honorary membership of the National Union of Journalists of the United Kingdom and Ireland in 2010. In 2017, she received recognition for her courage in the fight against impunity by the Latin American & Caribbean Federation of Journalists (FEPALC).
