= Solange Lusiku Nsimire =

Congolese journalist

- Born: 1972
- Died: 2018
- Citizenship: Republic of Congo
- Occupation: Journalist

Solange Lusiku Nsimire (1972 – October 14, 2018) was a journalist and women's rights activist from the Democratic Republic of the Congo.

== Life ==
Nsimire was the first woman to run a written newspaper in South Kivu Province in the east of the Democratic Republic of the Congo.

Nsimire took over as editor-in-chief and publisher of Le Souverain, an independent newspaper based in Bukavu, in 2007 after the death of the founder, Nunu Salufa. The newspaper largely focused on promoting democracy and advancing women's rights. She managed to resuscitate the newspaper from a moribund state despite facing repeated threats for her journalistic activity. While working at a radio station, she was forced into hiding after security service members became enraged by her reporting. In 2008, her home was attacked three times. On one occasion, armed men tied up her husband and children and demanded that they inform them of Nsimire's whereabouts. The last home attack led to gunmen stealing their family savings, after which they decided to move.

After continued incidents, MONUSCO advised Nsimire and her child to flee South Kivu for three months in 2012. That same year, she was awarded an honorary doctorate from the Université Catholique de Louvain.

In 2014, Nsimire won a Courage in Journalism Award from the International Women's Media Foundation.

== Death ==
Nsimire died in Kinshasa on October 14, 2018.
