= The Best Is Yet to Come (Bonnie Tyler album) =

Studio album by Bonnie Tyler
- Released: 26 February 2021
- Studios: The Factory Sound, Woldingham
- Length: 44:40
- Label: earMUSIC
- Producer: David Mackay

Bonnie Tyler chronology
| Between the Earth and the Stars (2019) | The Best Is Yet to Come (2021) | In Berlin (2024) |

Singles from The Best Is Yet to Come
- 1. "When the Lights Go Down" Released: 18 December 2020; 2. "The Best Is Yet to Come" Released: 8 January 2021; 3. "Dreams Are Not Enough" Released: 26 February 2021

The Best Is Yet to Come is the eighteenth and final studio album by Welsh singer Bonnie Tyler. It was released on 26 February 2021 through earMUSIC. It is Tyler's fourth album with producer David Mackay and her last album to be released prior to her death in July 2026.

The album was supported by three singles and a 38-date tour of Europe, delayed until late 2023 due to the COVID-19 pandemic. The Best Is Yet to Come became Tyler's first physical album release in the United States since Free Spirit in 1996. The album peaked at no. 9 on the UK Independent Albums chart.

The album received generally positive reviews from critics, who praised Tyler's powerful voice and the nostalgic yet fresh production. The singles "When the Lights Go Down," "Dreams Are Not Enough," and "Stuck to My Guns" highlighted the album's blend of classic rock and contemporary pop sounds. The delayed tour, once commenced, was met with enthusiasm from fans, eager to see Tyler perform live again.

== Background and conception ==
On 4 March 2020, Tyler told Gold Radio that she had completed a new album. The album was originally set for release in March 2020, but it was pushed back due to the COVID-19 pandemic.

Footage of songwriter Steve Womack performing a portion of his song "When the Lights Go Down" was published on Tyler's website on 14 April. Tyler then began posting samples of some of the tracks on her Instagram page. The artwork and track listing was revealed on 10 December 2020, along with a three-track preview uploaded to Tyler's YouTube channel. Tyler began releasing weekly samples of individual tracks on her Facebook and Instagram pages on 27 December 2020.

== Music and lyrics ==
"The Best Is Yet to Come" adopts the sound of 80s pop rock. Tyler told Ultimate Classic Rock she felt "When the Lights Go Down" had a similar sound to the music of Bruce Springsteen and Rod Stewart.

The album contains four cover songs; "Somebody's Hero" by C.B. Green, "I'm Only Guilty (Of Loving You)" previously recorded by Chick Willis and Tab Benoit, "I'm Not in Love" by 10cc, and "Catch the Wind" by Donovan. The latter two songs had originally been intended as bonus tracks on Tyler's previous album, Between the Earth and the Stars. "Stronger Than a Man" was first performed by Deborah Cox on The Kate, recorded in October 2018 and broadcast on 31 May 2019. However Bonnie was the first recording artist to record the song.

"Stuck to My Guns" features Ecuadorian musician Leo Rojas on panpipes. Tyler met Rojas at the Vatican's Concerto di Natale in December 2019, where both had been invited to perform in the presence of Pope Francis. Rojas later teased a collaboration with Tyler in an Instagram post.

On 8 March 2021, Tyler published a video on TikTok explaining her reasons for recording "Stronger Than a Man" to mark International Women's Day. She stated: "There's a line in that song that stood out to me. It says: "A woman's place is anywhere a woman wants to stand." "It took me back to some times in my earlier career that I'd be the only girl on the whole festival bill." The video was posted as part of the #WeAreHere campaign, raising awareness of female representation in the music industry. Her post was featured on TikTok's UK Music Hub.

== Promotion ==
=== Singles ===
"When the Lights Go Down" was released as the first single on 18 December 2020. The lyric video was premiered by Ultimate Classic Rock the day before. "The Best Is Yet to Come" was released in the United Kingdom and Ireland on 8 January 2020, as the album's second single. "Dreams Are Not Enough" received a worldwide release as the album's third single on 26 February 2021, accompanied by a lyric video.

=== Tour ===
On 15 December 2020, Tyler announced that she would embark on a European tour to commemorate her 70th birthday and the release of "The Best Is Yet to Come." The tour was set to begin on 17 February 2022, at the Mitsubishi Electric Halle in Düsseldorf, Germany, and conclude on 29 April 2022, at the Kongress am Park in Augsburg, Germany, with a total of 38 dates in venues throughout Austria, Belgium, France, Germany and Switzerland. However, only three dates in Cottbus, Halle and Berlin took place as scheduled. The rest of the tour was postponed to late 2023 due to complications related to the COVID-19 pandemic.

== Critical reception ==
Professional ratings
Review scores
| Source | Rating |
|---|---|
| Belfast Telegraph | 7/10 |
| Classic Pop | 4/5 stars |
| Cryptic Rock | 5/5 stars |
| Digital Journal | 5/5 stars |
| Helsingin Sanomat | 3/5 stars |
| The News International | 7/10 |
| Retro Pop | 4/5 stars |
| Onet Muzyka | 3/6 |
| The Scotsman | 3/5 stars |

Retro Pop magazine named The Best Is Yet to Come as Tyler's best album since Hide Your Heart (1988), noting that Tyler sounds "rested, strong and raring to go." In a review of the single, Retro Pop described the title track as "a slice of 80's new wave perfection," featuring "pulsing synths and a harmony laden sing-a-long chorus that proves irresistible." Markos Papadatos of Digital Journal stated that Tyler "proves that she is like a fine wine, where her harking and heavenly voice only gets better with age and experience," describing the album as "eclectic." In Belfast Telegraph, Beverley Rouse described The Best Is Yet to Come as "an enjoyable listen," and commended Tyler for "bringing something different" with her cover of "I'm Not in Love" by 10cc. The Scotsman critic Fiona Shepherd called the album "a patchy playlist of covers and originals," but noted "I’m Only Guilty (Of Loving You)" as a strong moment. Onet Muzyka critic Bartosz Sąder noted that The Best Is Yet to Come is "not as expressive" as Tyler's previous albums, but that her "hoarse vocal fits perfectly into the style of the 80's-inspired songs." Writing for the Finnish newspaper Helsingin Sanomat, Mervi Vuorela opined that Tyler would have achieved better results with hard rock songs instead of pop rock.

== Track listing ==
The Best Is Yet to Come track listing
| No. | Title | Writer(s) | Length |
|---|---|---|---|
| 1. | "The Best Is Yet to Come" | Steve Womack | 3:03 |
| 2. | "Dreams Are Not Enough" | Neil Lockwood | 3:31 |
| 3. | "Hungry Hearts" | Josh Renton | 3:12 |
| 4. | "Stuck to My Guns" | Womack | 3:49 |
| 5. | "When the Lights Go Down" | Womack | 3:29 |
| 6. | "Stronger Than a Man" | Shelly Peiken; Desmond Child; Ruslan Odnoralov | 3:31 |
| 7. | "I'm Not in Love" | Eric Stewart; Graham Gouldman | 4:24 |
| 8. | "Somebody's Hero" | Clemens Benecke | 4:00 |
| 9. | "Call Me Thunder" | Womack | 4:38 |
| 10. | "I'm Only Guilty (Of Loving You)" | Dave Williams; Mick Parker | 3:43 |
| 11. | "You're the One" | Kevin Dunne; David Mackay | 4:04 |
| 12. | "Catch the Wind" | Donovan | 3:15 |
| Total length: | | | 44:40 |

== Personnel ==
Credits adapted from liner notes.

=== Musicians ===
- Bonnie Tyler – lead vocals
- David Mackay – production (all tracks), percussion (1–2, 4–5), backing vocals (3, 5, 9), strings (7, 11), drum programming (3, 8), bass programming (3), extra keys (4), keyboards (6), percussion FX (6), piano (11)
- Richard Cottle – keyboards (1–9), organ (10–11), saxophone (7, 10), drum programming (7), percussion FX (6)
- Steve Womack – backing vocals, guitars (5, 9)
- Josh Renton – backing vocals (3), guitars (3)
- Daz Shields – drums (1–2, 5), backing vocals (5)
- Neil Lockwood – backing vocals (2, 8)
- Kevin Dunne – acoustic guitar (12), bass (11–12)
- Miriam Stockley – backing vocals (1, 4–6, 9–12)
- Miriam Grey – backing vocals (2–3, 7–8)
- Laurence Cottle – bass (1–10)
- Bob Jenkins – drums (4, 6, 9–11)
- Geoff Whitehorn – guitars (1–2, 4–7, 9–12)
- Ian Stuart Lynn – piano (10)
- Ray Russell – guitars (8, 11)
- Leo Rojas – pan pipes (4)
- John Parr – guitar (11)

=== Technical ===
- David Mackay – recording, mixing
- Rod Houison – recording (Stockley on 1, 4–6, 9–12)
- Silvio D'Anza – recording (Rojas on 4)
- Jerry Stevenson – mastering

=== Design ===
- Fulaleo – cover illustration
- Jenny Seiler – additional artwork
- Tina Korhonen – photography

== Charts ==
Chart performance for The Best Is Yet to Come
| Chart (2021) | Peak position |
|---|---|
| Austrian Albums (Ö3 Austria) | 47 |
| French Albums Physiques (SNEP) | 149 |
| German Albums (Offizielle Top 100) | 35 |
| Scottish Albums (Official Charts) | 28 |
| Swiss Albums (Schweizer Hitparade) | 28 |
| UK Album Downloads (OCC) | 35 |
| UK Album Sales (OCC) | 18 |
| UK Independent Albums (Official Charts) | 9 |
| UK Physical Albums (OCC) | 18 |

== Release history ==
Release history for The Best Is Yet to Come
| Region | Date | Format(s) | Label | Ref. |
|---|---|---|---|---|
| Various | 26 February 2021 | CD; Digital download | earMUSIC | |
