= Between the Earth and the Stars Live Tour =

2019 concert tour by Bonnie Tyler

- Continental tour by Bonnie Tyler
- Promotional poster
- Location: Europe
- Associated album: Between the Earth and the Stars
- Start date: 4 April 2019
- End date: 1 June 2019
- No. of shows: 23
- Supporting acts: More Than Words; C.B. Green

Bonnie Tyler concert chronology
- Greatest Hits Tour (2017); Between the Earth and the Stars Live Tour (2019); South America Tour (2022)

The Between the Earth and the Stars Live Tour was a concert tour by Welsh singer Bonnie Tyler, launched in support of her seventeenth studio album Between the Earth and the Stars (2019). It began on 4 April 2019 in Munich, and concluded on 1 June 2019 at the W-Festival in Frankfurt, Germany, consisting of 23 shows.

Critics praised Tyler for her energetic performances and effective use of stage lights.

A live album was recorded at the Admiralspalast in Berlin, and is set for release on 5 April 2024 through earMUSIC. The 20 May show at L'Olympia in Paris was also recorded and released as a concert film through Canal+ in 2020.

== Background ==
The tour was announced in October 2018, before Tyler's album Between the Earth and the Stars had been announced. German singer-songwriter C.B. Green was announced as the support act for 11 tour dates.

== Critical reception ==
Ulrike Borowczyk of Berliner Morgenpost noted the audience's diverse age range, a "powerful lights show" and a "storm of electric guitars" at Tyler's show in Berlin. Léna Lutaud of Le Figaro noted the diversity of Tyler's stage material, featuring country music and album-oriented rock.

== Set list ==
The following set list is from the concert on 20 May 2019 in Paris. It is not intended to represent all shows of the tour.

1. "Flat on the Floor"
2. "Hold On"
3. "It's a Heartache"
4. "Seven Waves Away"
5. "Have You Ever Seen the Rain?"
6. "Move"
7. "This Is Gonna Hurt"
8. "Let's Go Crazy Tonight"
9. "Bad for Loving You"
10. "Total Eclipse of the Heart"
11. "Between the Earth and the Stars"
12. "Faster Than the Speed of Night"

Encore

13. "Turtle Blues"
14. "Slow Walk"
15. "The Best"'
16. "Holding Out for a Hero"
17. "Older"

== Tour dates ==
Between the Earth and the Stars Live Tour
| Date | City | Country | Venue | Opening act(s) |
|---|---|---|---|---|
| 28 April 2019 | Munich | Germany | Circus Krone | C.B. Green |
| 29 April 2019 | Nuremberg | Germany | Meistersingerhalle | C.B. Green |
| 2 May 2019 | Suhl | Germany | Congress Centrum | C.B. Green |
| 4 May 2019 | Cologne | Germany | Musical Dome | C.B. Green |
| 5 May 2019 | Ostend | Belgium | Kursaal | C.B. Green |
| 7 May 2019 | Halle | Germany | Georg-Friedrich-Händel-Halle | C.B. Green |
| 8 May 2019 | Berlin | Germany | Admiralspalast | C.B. Green |
| 10 May 2019 | Bremen | Germany | Metropol Theater | More Than Words |
| 11 May 2019 | Utrecht | Netherlands | TivoliVredenburg | More Than Words |
| 13 May 2019 | Zürich | Switzerland | Volkshaus | C.B. Green |
| 14 May 2019 | Karlsruhe | Germany | Schwarzwaldhalle | C.B. Green |
| 16 May 2019 | Zwickau | Germany | Stadthalle | More Than Words |
| 17 May 2019 | Osnabrück | Germany | OsnabrückHalle | More Than Words |
| 19 May 2019 | Luxembourg City | Luxembourg | Den Atelier | More Than Words |
| 20 May 2019 | Paris | France | L'Olympia | More Than Words |
| 22 May 2019 | Singen | Germany | Stadthalle | More Than Words |
| 23 May 2019 | Ulm | Germany | Congress Centrum | More Than Words |
| 25 May 2019 | Vienna | Austria | Stadthalle F | More Than Words |
| 26 May 2019 | Graz | Austria | Helmut List Halle | More Than Words |
| 28 May 2019 | Hannover | Germany | Theater am Aegi | C.B. Green |
| 29 May 2019 | Rostock | Germany | Stadthalle | C.B. Green |
| 31 May 2019 | Dortmund | Germany | Westfalenhallen Halle 3A | More Than Words |
| 1 June 2019 | Frankfurt | Germany | Alte Oper | More Than Words |
