= Anja Niedringhaus =

German photojournalist (1965–2014)

Anja Niedringhaus (German pronunciation: [ˈanja ˈniːdʁɪŋˌhaʊs]; 12 October 1965 – 4 April 2014) was a German photojournalist who worked for the Associated Press (AP). She was the only woman on a team of 11 AP photographers that won the 2005 Pulitzer Prize for Breaking News Photography for coverage of the Iraq War. That same year she was awarded the International Women's Media Foundation's Courage in Journalism prize.

Niedringhaus had covered Afghanistan for several years before she was killed on 4 April 2014, while covering the presidential election, after an Afghan policeman opened fire at the car she was waiting in at a checkpoint, part of an election convoy.

== Early life and education ==
Niedringhaus was born in Höxter, North Rhine-Westphalia, and began working as a freelance photographer at age 17 while still in high school. In 1989, she covered the collapse of the Berlin Wall for the German newspaper Göttinger Tageblatt.

== Career ==
Niedringhaus began full-time work as a photojournalist in 1990 when she joined the European Pressphoto Agency in Frankfurt, Germany. As EPA's Chief Photographer she spent the first ten years of her career covering the wars in the former Yugoslavia.

In 2001, Niedringhaus photographed the aftermath of the September 11 terrorist attacks in New York City and then traveled to Afghanistan, where she spent three months covering the fall of the Taliban. In 2002, she joined Associated Press, for whom she has worked in Iraq, Afghanistan, the Gaza Strip, Israel, Kuwait and Turkey. On 23 October 2005, she received the IWMF Courage in Journalism Award from American broadcaster Bob Schieffer at a ceremony in New York.

In 2007, Niedringhaus was awarded a Nieman Fellowship at Harvard University. She was part of the 69th class of Nieman Fellows where she studied culture, history, religion and the issues of gender in the Middle East and their impact on the development of foreign policy in the United States and other Western countries. Established in 1938, the Nieman program is the oldest mid-career fellowship for journalists in the world. The fellowships are awarded to working journalists of accomplishment and promise for an academic year of study at the university.

Niedringhaus' work has been exhibited at the Museum of Modern Art in Frankfurt, Germany, and in galleries and museums elsewhere, including Graz, Austria.

Her story is told in Roman Kuhn's biopic Die Bilderkriegerin - Anja Niedringhaus, the English version is titled Anja: Life on the Frontline.

== Death ==
Niedringhaus was killed at the age of 48 in an attack in Afghanistan, while covering the country's 2014 presidential election. Fellow AP journalist, Kathy Gannon, a 60-year-old Canadian, was seriously injured in the attack and underwent emergency surgery. The attack took place at a checkpost on the outskirts of Khost city in Tani District, where the journalists were part of an independent election commission convoy delivering ballots under the protection of the Afghan National Army and Afghan police. While the two were waiting in the car, an Afghan police unit commander named Naqibullah walked up to their car and opened fire while yelling "Allahu Akbar" (God is Great); shooting the two women in the back seat. After the attack, the officer surrendered, and was taken into custody. Six judges at the Kabul District Court found Naqibullah guilty of wounding, murder and treason and sentenced him to death, reduced to 20 years in prison on appeal.

== See also ==
- List of German photojournalists
- List of journalists killed during the War in Afghanistan (2001–2021)
