= Lübecker Nachrichten =

Regional daily in Germany

- Sample front page of Lübecker Nachrichten
- Type: Daily newspaper from Tuesday through Sunday; on Monday only as E-Paper
- Format: Berliner
- Owner: Lübecker Nachrichten GmbH
- Editor: Rüdiger Ditz
- Founded: 3 April 1946
- Headquarters: Lübeck, Germany
- Circulation: 50,116
- Website: www.ln-online.de

The Lübecker Nachrichten (LN; German for Lübeck News) is a regional daily newspaper in Germany, covering Schleswig-Holstein and western Mecklenburg-Vorpommern. It is, along with the Schleswig-Holsteinischer Zeitungsverlag and the Kieler Nachrichten, one of the largest daily newspapers in Schleswig-Holstein.

LN is published daily in print and online (as an e-paper) except on Mondays and days after holidays. Since August, 2022 it is also published as an e-paper on Mondays. It was formed in 1946 from the Lübecker General-Anzeiger founded in 1832 (Lübeck General-Gazette), a title it still uses for its local Lübeck supplement.

The paper is published by Lübecker Nachrichten GmbH, headquartered in the Buntekuh district of Lübeck and is majority owned by Verlagsgesellschaft Madsack GmbH & Co. KG. Editor-in-chief is Rüdiger Ditz.
