= Göttinger Tageblatt =

German newspaper in Göttingen, Lower Saxony

- Type: Daily local newspaper
- Owner(s): Madsack Publishing Group
- Editor: Uwe Graells-Thöne
- Founded: 1889
- Political alignment: Center
- Circulation: 24.001
- Website: Göttinger Tageblatt

The Göttinger Tageblatt is the single printed local daily newspaper to circulate in Göttingen in the south of the state of Lower Saxony in Germany. The coverage area of the paper includes the city of Göttingen, the surrounding county and the cities of Northeim and Osterode am Harz.

== Background ==
It was founded in 1889. Since World War I it has become increasingly nationalist and it supported the Nazi movement even before it came to power in 1933. The Göttinger Tageblatt itself published a critical examination of this part of its history for the 125 years celebration:

- Göttinger Tageblatt during National Socialism

Since 1973 it is part of the Madsack publishing group from the capital city of the state of Lower Saxony, Hanover. National and statewide issues are taken from Madsack's Hanover daily Hannoversche Allgemeine Zeitung since then, while the editorial department of the Göttinger Tageblatt confines itself on local affairs only.

== Alternatives ==
Other sources of local news for the people of Göttingen are provided by the local Stadtradio Göttingen, the HNA, a newspaper based in Kassel with local editions for Northeim and Hann. Münden, and the regional newscasts of the radio stations NDR 1, Hitradio Antenne Niedersachsen and FFN radio:

- local news from HNA regional newspaper
- local news from Stadtradio Göttingen

There have also been efforts towards establishing local periodicals as alternative local news sources in the past years, but until now they all failed because of lack of revenue and because of onesided left wing and alternative editorial alignments so that these papers haven't been able to reach sufficient acceptance and therefore circulations.

The local radio station, Stadradio Göttingen, has been established in 1997. It is indirectly founded by the state of Lower Saxony. It broadcasts local news bulletins several times a day but its audience is quite low due to a considerable lack of professionalism.

For many years the Göttinger Presse was a rival newspaper to the Tageblatt, and didn't suffer from the Tageblatt's Nazi association, but it ceased publication sometime in the 1950s (precise reference needed!).
