= International Women's Media Foundation =

Organization for women's rights

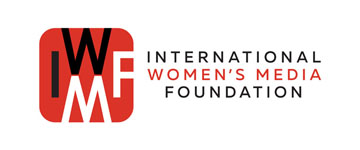
- Company type: Nonprofit organization
- Industry: Journalism, human rights, social justice, women's rights
- Founded: 1989; 37 years ago
- Headquarters: Washington, D.C., United States
- Revenue: 627,256 United States dollar (2017)
- Total assets: 6,723,425 United States dollar (2022)
- Website: iwmf.org

The International Women's Media Foundation (IWMF), based in Washington, D.C., is an internationally active organization working to improve the status of women in media. The IWMF has created programs and tools to help women find practical solutions to the obstacles they face in their careers and lives as they work in media. The IWMF's work includes a wide range of programs including international reporting fellowships grant opportunities and emergency crisis funding. IWMF carries out research on the status of women in news media, examining both working conditions and production of content related to women. IWMF helps to develop resources to support the safety and health of journalists. IWMF presents the Courage in Journalism, Anja Niedringhaus Courage in Photojournalism, Wallis Annenberg Justice for Women Journalists, and Lifetime Achievement Awards.

The safety of women journalists has been a major concern of the IWMF since its founding in 1990. The organization recognizes that women, Transgender people, LGBTQIA people, and people of color experience marginalization and disproportionate levels of harassment and violence as journalists. The IWMF advocates for press freedom both nationally and internationally. Through programs such as Newsroom Safety Across America, the IWMF seeks "to establish a safety ecosystem within local newsrooms". IWMF is one of five founding members of the Journalist Assistance Network, formed in 2025 to provide resources and training in legal and safety matters to journalists and newsrooms in the United States. IWMF tracks cases of journalists in danger and actively appeals to international governments to release journalists in captivity and protect journalists in danger.

== History ==
The International Women's Media Foundation was formed in 1990 to strengthen the role of women who work in news media through information sharing, networking, and training, and to further freedom of the press on a global scale. The group organized a meeting of one hundred women journalists from fifty countries, the "News in the Nineties" conference, held November 11–13, 1990, in Washington, DC. Speakers included Steven Ross of Time Warner, Barbara Walters of ABC-1V, and Katharine Graham of the Washington Post.

In March 2011, the IWMF organized an international conference of women leaders at George Washington University to discuss gender equity in the media. The IWMF's Global Report on the Status of Women in the News Media (2011), based on two years of research, examined 522 media companies in 59 nations worldwide. The report set a baseline for the study of women working in the news industry, and revealed significant imbalances in position and payment. Results varied between countries, with women holding only a third of jobs worldwide. Women tended to be under-represented at higher levels of management, even in countries where they neared parity in overall employment. Over half of the newsrooms reported that they had sexual harassment policies. However, respondents from both developed and developing countries commonly responded that they perceived such policies to be unnecessary and did not see sexual harassment as a problem. This perception is at odds with research documenting harassment against women journalists, both in the field and within newsrooms.

In 2013, the International Women's Media Foundation established the IWMF Emergency Fund to aid female journalists. IWMF has also partnered with The Black Journalists Relief Fund to provide emergency funds and therapy funds for black journalists.

In 2018, the IWMF surveyed women journalists, 90 percent of whom stated that online harassment had increased over the past five years. Ten percent reported experiencing highly concerning harassment within the past year, including death threats, identity theft on social media, hacking of email accounts, doxing, and physical threats sent to private accounts. IWMF encourages all levels of news organizations to engage in risk planning, prepare in advance, and have clear policies and practices for supporting journalists who are attacked.

In July 2020 the IWMF helped to organize the Coalition Against Online Violence, a group of more than 80 organizations internationally working to combat online attacks. CAOV seeks solutions and provides collective support for journalists and others affected by online violence through its Online Violence Response Hub, which was launched in 2021.

In 2021, IWMF worked with the Thomson Reuters Foundation, UNESCO, and the International News Safety Institute to publish practical legal guides for journalists and organizations, including Online attacks against journalists: Know your rights, The Practical Guide for Women Journalists on How to Respond to Online Harassment and Gender-Sensitive Safety Policies for Newsrooms: Checklist and Guidelines. Content includes discussion of specific legal tools and of journalists' legal rights in 13 countries. Further resources were published in 2022, including a Mental Health Guide for Journalists facing Online Violence, and A Guide for Protecting Journalists and Newsrooms Against Online Violence. These resources are also relevant to fact-checkers, who are increasingly experiencing harassment.

In 2023 the IWMF worked with the American Press Institute to develop an inclusive guide for journalists dealing with online harassment and threats. They worked with PEN America to develop Digital Safety Snacks, short online videos describing steps that people can take to protect themselves from online abuse.

From June to December 2024, IWMF, CAOV and others carried out an #ElectSafely Campaign in support of journalists covering contentious elections worldwide. IWMF carried out safety trainings and events with PEN America and other partners as part of a U.S. Election Safety Summer campaign.

In 2026, the IWMF was designated as an 'undesirable organization' in Russia.

== Reports ==
Many of the IWMF's resources are published in multiple languages. Some appear in country-specific editions.

- 2011, Global Report on the Status of Women in the News Media (IWMF and UNESCO).
- 2018, Attacks and Harassment: The Impact on Female Journalists and Their Reporting
- 2021, Online attacks against journalists: Know your rights
- 2021, The Practical Guide for Women Journalists on How to Respond to Online Harassment
- 2021, Gender-Sensitive Safety Policies for Newsrooms: Checklist and Guidelines
- 2022, Mental Health Guide for Journalists facing Online Violence (in English, Farsi, and Arabic)
- 2022, A Guide for Protecting Journalists and Newsrooms Against Online Violence

== Awards Given ==
The International Women's Media Foundation awards are annual prizes given by the IWMF to recognize significant work by women journalists: the Courage in Journalism Award (awarded since the IWMF's foundation in 1990); the Lifetime Achievement Award (awarded from 1991 to 2018); the Anja Niedringhaus Courage in Photojournalism Award (awarded since 2015); the Gwen Ifill Award (awarded since 2017); and the Wallis Annenberg Justice for Women Journalists Award (awarded since 2021). The awards are presented yearly at ceremonies including New York, Washington, D.C. Los Angeles, and Beverly Hills, California. These awards "celebrate women journalists who set themselves apart by their extraordinary bravery". Awardees can work in any country and be of any nationality.

=== Courage in Journalism Award ===
Courage in Journalism Awards "honor women journalists who face danger to uncover the truth and raise the bar for reporting under duress". Courage in Journalism Award winners have included Claudia Duque (Colombia), Tsering Woeser (Tibet) and Vicky Ntetema (Tanzania), Najiba Ayubi (Afghanistan), photographer Nour Kelze (Syria), Bopha Phorn (Cambodia), Arwa Damon (Lebanon), Solange Lusiku Nsimire (Democratic Republic of the Congo), Brankica Stanković (Serbia), Gulchehra Hoja (Radio Free Asia), Solafa Magdy (Egypt), Yakeen Bido (Syria), Jessikka Aro (Finland), Cerise Castle, Lynsey Addario (USA) and Victoria Roshchyna (Ukraine).

=== Anja Niedringhaus Courage in Photojournalism Award ===
The Anja Niedringhaus Courage in Photojournalism Award was first given in 2015. Niedringhaus, an internationally acclaimed German photographer who worked with the Associated Press photographer, was killed in Afghanistan on April 4, 2014, when an Afghan policeman shot into her car. Niedringhaus had previously received an IWMF Courage in Journalism Award in 2005. The award in her honor was created with an endowment from the Howard G. Buffett Foundation. The inaugural recipient was Heidi Levine (2015). Other recipients include Kashmiri photojournalist Masrat Zahra (2020) Andrea Bruce (2018), Stephanie Sinclair (2017) and Fatima Shbair (2021).

=== Gwen Ifill Award ===
The Gwen Ifill Award was first given in 2017, to recognize "an outstanding woman journalist of color who carries forward Ifill's legacy of mentorship, leadership and commitment to diversity in journalism." The inaugural recipient of the award was Michele Norris. Other awardees include Tasneem Raja (2024) and Nikole Hannah-Jones (2019).

=== Wallis Annenberg Justice for Women Journalists Award ===
The Wallis Annenberg Justice for Women Journalists Award was created in 2021 to honor journalists who have been unjustly imprisoned as a result of their work. It was first awarded in 2021 to Katsiaryna Andreyeva and Darya Chultsova from Belarus. In 2022, Chinese columnist Huang Xueqin received the award.

=== Lifetime Achievement Award ===
From 1991 to 2018 IWMF also honored women who had had groundbreaking careers in journalism by giving them the Lifetime Achievement Award. According to the IWMF, Lifetime Achievement Award winners "kicked down barriers to make it possible for women all over the world to find their voices and make them heard". Award recipients include the first black female editor of a newspaper in Zimbabwe, Edna Machirori (2013), Alma Guillermoprieto from Mexico (2010), Amira Hass from Israel (2009), and Edith Lederer from the United States (2008).

== Fellowships ==
The IWMF offers a variety of opportunities in support of women journalists, including early career journalists, through fellowships, small grants, and funds. These include:

=== Elizabeth Neuffer Fellowship ===
In collaboration with MIT's Center for International Studies, The Boston Globe and The New York Times, the IWMF annually presents the Elizabeth Neuffer Fellowship. The fellowship is awarded to a woman journalist who has at least three years of professional experience and covers human rights or social justice issues. The program is structured flexibly to provide the fellow with opportunities for academic study and research at MIT and the development of reporting skills, covering topics related to human rights at the news outlets.

The program is named for Elizabeth Neuffer, a 1998 IWMF Courage in Journalism Award winner and Boston Globe correspondent who was killed in Iraq on May 9, 2003. The fellowship commemorates her memory and advances her mission of promoting international understanding of human rights or social justice. Past Neuffer Fellows have been from Colombia, Australia, Iraq and the United States.

=== Lauren Brown Fellowship ===
IWMF also gives out small grants through the Lauren Brown Fellowship. The Lauren Brown Fellowship supports women and nonbinary journalists whose projects expose under-reported and critical issues. It can be used by early career journalists for professional development and skills training.

The program is named for Lauren Alix Brown. Brown was a journalist, editor, and mentor. She was part of the founding team of the international digital publication Quartz, where she worked from 2012 to 2019. Brown died of breast cancer in 2019 at the age of 37.

=== Kari Howard Fund for Narrative Journalism ===
The Kari Howard Fund for Narrative Journalism awards small grants annually to support "the reporting and publication of compelling human stories". The award is given in memory of Kari Howard (1962–2022), an award-winning editor and mentor. Howard had worked as editor of Nieman Storyboard, as Storytelling Editor at Reuters in London, and as editor of Column One and Great Reads at The Los Angeles Times. She was known for her "exemplary storytelling skills" in narrative journalism. Howard died of cancer in 2022.

== Other Activities ==
=== Leadership Institute for Women Journalists ===
In 1998 the IWMF launched week-long Leadership Institutes for veteran woman journalists. The institutes train women to maintain successful careers in media organizations and provide the necessary skills to allow women to become leaders in their newsrooms. Veteran newswomen come together to share leadership styles, strategies for managing people and change, tips for negotiating salary, navigating politics and balancing work and home. Institutes have been held in the U.S. as well as worldwide and trainings have been carried out in multiple languages. Past Institutes include Africa (Kampala, Uganda, 2009; Bamako, Mali, 2010), Europe/the former Soviet Republics (Lithuania, 2008), Latin America and the United States (Chicago, 2009).

=== The Maisha Yetu Project ===
The Maisha Yetu ("Our Lives") project was created in 2002 with a $1.5 million grant from the Bill & Melinda Gates Foundation to enhance the quality and consistency of reporting on HIV/AIDS, tuberculosis and malaria in Africa. The first phase of the project was qualitative and quantitative research on how the media cover HIV/AIDS, TB and malaria, in Botswana, Cameroon, Kenya, Malawi and Senegal. The results of this research were published as Deadline for Health: The Media's Response to Covering HIV/AIDS, TB and Malaria in Africa (2004).

The second phase of Maisha Yetu was the creation of Centers of Excellence in Botswana, Kenya and Senegal, with the goal of creating practical, sustainable measures to help African media improve their health coverage. A report on the project, Writing for Our Lives: How the Maisha Yetu Project Changed Health Coverage in Africa, was published in July 2006. A conference was also held in Johannesburg, South Africa in July 2006, where representatives from the Centers of Excellence shared their experiences with representatives from key African media and nongovernmental and women's organizations.

The Maisha Yetu suggested eight best practices for health reporting:

1. Engage with top editors and management to gain commitment to health stories
2. Increase professionalism of health journalists through specialized training
3. Support a "professional niche" for health journalists
4. Share resources among journalists
5. Examine diverse sources of information
6. Go outside the newsroom when reporting
7. Maintain regular contact within all levels of health projects
8. Learn to manage newsroom politics

Following the initiative, the project reported an increase of 20-30% in number of stories written by provincial reporters in Senegal about HIV/AIDS, TB and malaria.

=== Reporting on Agriculture and Women Project ===
Reporting on Agriculture and Women: Africa began in June 2007, as a four-year project aimed at changing the way the media cover agriculture, rural development and farming stories in Africa. The IWMF provided training to journalists to help them effectively provide coverage of agriculture and the role of women in food production and rural development. In the first phase, research in Mali, Uganda, and Zambia indicated that agriculture accounted for 70% of total employment in Sub-Saharan Africa, and that women produced 70% of the region's food. However, in terms of the news, only 4% of media coverage dealt with agriculture. Women were a focus of only 7% of the stories about agriculture, making them "almost invisible" in the media despite playing a dominant role in food production. In February 2009 the IWMF published its research in a publication titled Sowing the Seeds, which emphasized three key findings:

1. Under-reporting in media: Only 4 percent of stories concerned agriculture even though agriculture was crucial to Africa's economic growth.
2. Under-representation of farmers in agricultural stories: In the agricultural stories monitored, 70 percent of the sources quoted were government officials and experts or professionals (male or female). Only 20 percent of those quoted were farmers or rural/agricultural workers.
3. Invisibility of women: Despite producing 70 percent of the food in sub-Saharan Africa and making up half of the region's population, women were just 11 percent of the sources quoted and 22 percent of the reporters.

During the second phase of the project, goals included raising the quantity and quality of reporting on farming and rural development, focusing more reporting on the importance of women to the economics of rural areas, and creating more gender equality in newsrooms. Using the same model as the Maisha Yetu project, Centers of Excellence were created to work with L'Essor and Radio Klédu (Mali); The Daily Monitor and Uganda Broadcasting Corporation (Uganda); and The Times of Zambia and Zambia National Broadcasting Corporation (Zambia). The IWMF staff and experienced local trainers provided on-site training to journalists. By 2010, over 100 journalists, half of whom were women, had received training through the program.

=== Reporta ===
Reporta
- Developer: IWMF
- Initial release: September 29, 2015
- Stable release: Android 1.1.2 (July 19, 2016; 9 years ago) iOS 1.1.2 (July 20, 2016; 9 years ago)
- Operating system: Android, iOS
- License: GPLv3
- Website: www.reporta.org
- Repository: github.com/ReportaIWMF

In September 2015, the IWMF released a free mobile security app designed for journalists. The app was received critically by security experts due to concerns that the app's construction and behavior were not sufficiently transparent, and that the app's data was insufficiently protected. The app was closed-source; the IWMF had not published the reports of the audits that it claimed to have done; the IWMF had access to the contents of the messages that were sent with the app as well as the locations of its users; and the app's privacy policy stated that the IWMF reserved the right to share this data with a wide variety of third parties, respond to subpoenas and court orders from an unspecified number of jurisdictions, and to modify the privacy policy at any time without prior notice to the app's users. Reverse engineering of the app revealed that "every action is logged", that the user's last locations were stored in plaintext and that the app used an insecure encryption protocol when connecting to the IWMF's server.

In response, the IWMF announced that they would release the application's source code under an open-source license. The IWMF subsequently released the source code on GitHub for the mobile app for iOS and Android as well as its backend database server, as free and open-source software under an GPLv3 license. In 2016, the Open Technology Fund in Washington, DC funded Cure53 to work with the IWMF. Cure53 carried out a penetration test and code audit, assessing both the Reporta apps and their PHP backend. Cure53 identified 32 security issues (27 vulnerabilities and 5 general weaknesses), 6 of which were considered "Critical". With some exceptions, the app itself "was not particularly flawed security-wise"; but the PHP backend and the web server were the source of "a vast majority of issues". Given the number and seriousness of the issues, Cure53 recommended "serious discussion about the future of the project".

== See also ==
- Women in journalism and media professions
