= OsnabrückHalle =

Coordinates: 52.2715°N 8.0419°E

The OsnabrückHalle (formerly Stadthalle Osnabrück) is a prominent events building in the city of Osnabrück, Lower Saxony, Germany.

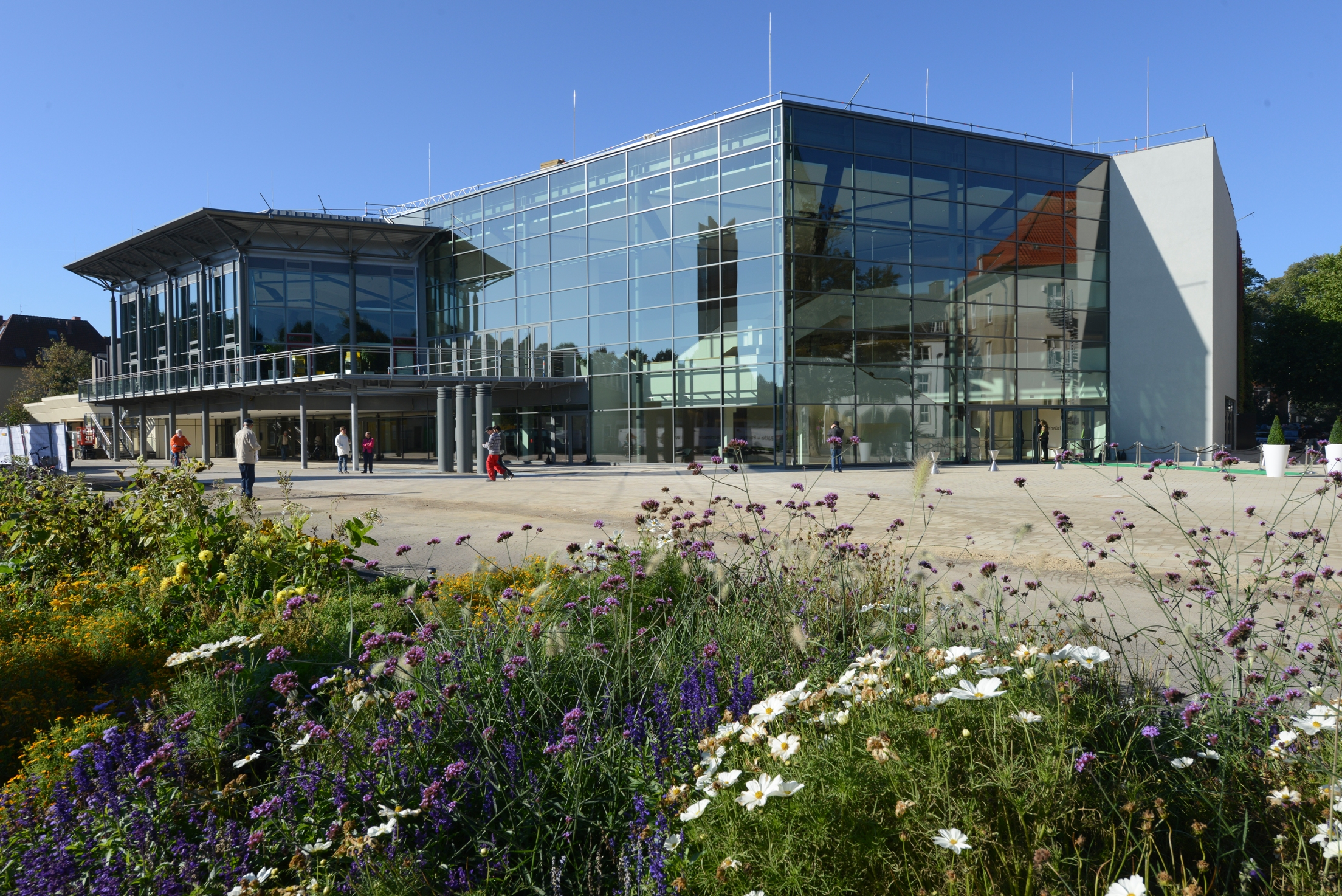
Exterior view of the OsnabrückHalle

== Before 1945 ==
In 1899 construction started on the first Stadthalle at Kollegienwall, close to Neumarkt, having been commissioned by the “Aktiengesellschaft Osnabrücker Vereinshaus” (Osnabrück Clubhouse PLC); it was finished in 1901. It was used as a venue for festivals and other events. in 1934 Theo Burlage and Bruno Dichler extended the Stadthalle to be able to accommodate 5,000 people. From 1917 to 1944 the right-hand side of the building with the corner towers served as an orphanage for around 100 children; it belonged to the episcopal see of the Roman Catholic Diocese of Osnabrück. A series of Allied air raids at the start of 1943 led to an evacuation of the 70 or so children occupying the building, who were transferred to the Mutterhaus (mother house) in Thuine. On 13 September 1944 the entire Stadthalle, along with all of its extensions, was completely destroyed in a bombing attack.

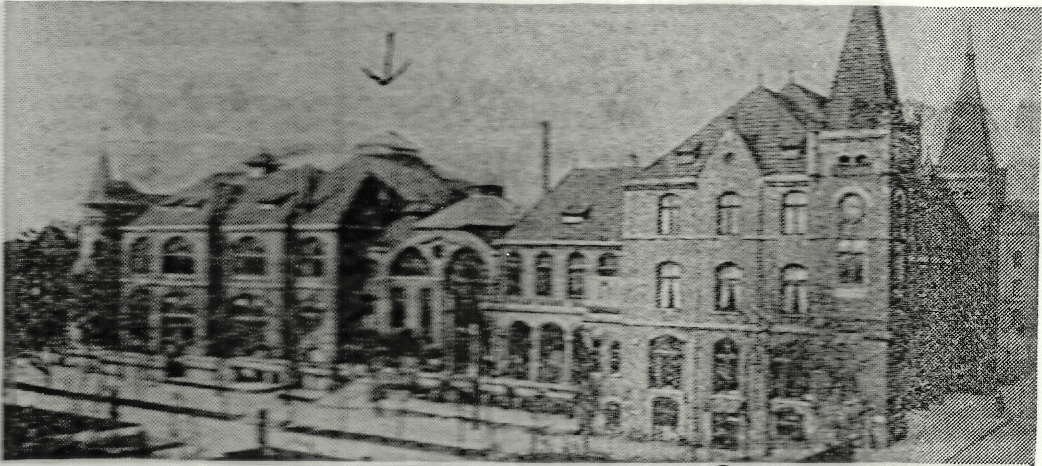
Old Stadthalle Osnabrück c. 1940
(orphanage to the right)

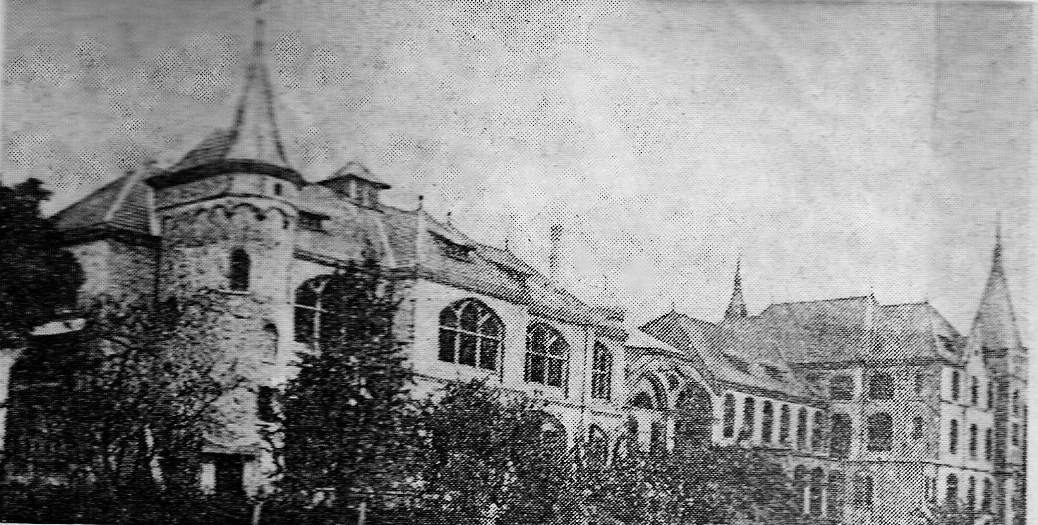
Old Stadthalle Osnabrück 1917-1944

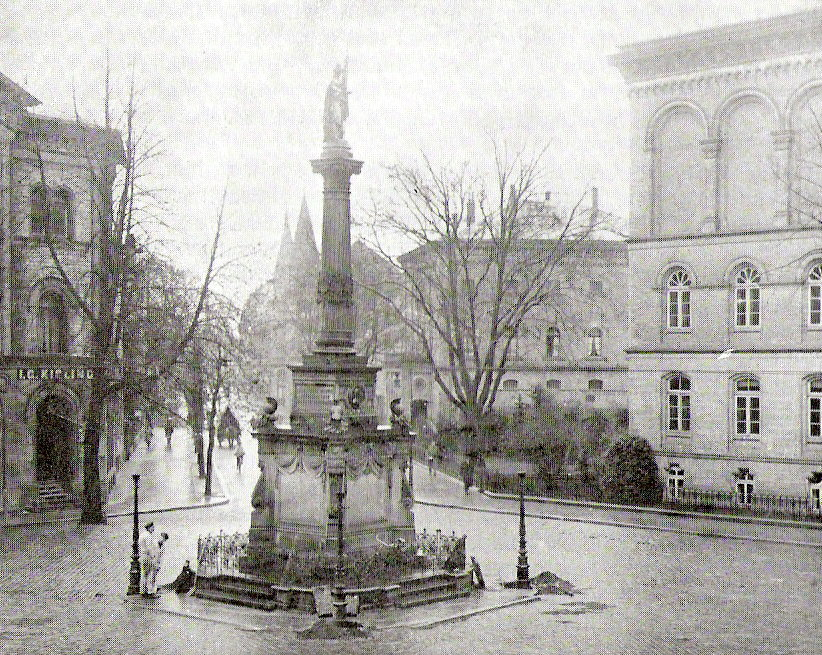
Spire of the old Stadthalle Osnabrück, behind the Straßenburger Platz war memorial
(regional court to the right).

== Since 1945 ==
After World War II barracks accommodation for the Handwerkskammer Osnabrück (Osnabrück Chamber of Crafts) was set up on the gardens of the old Stadthalle. Today a multi-storey car park and the district court – built in 1969 and located directly on Kollegienwall – occupy this area. During the mid-1970s plans were put together for a new Stadthalle, which was finally built on the garden of Osnabrück Castle. The new Stadthalle Osnabrück was officially opened on 12 January 1979. The opening phase took four days, with roughly 50,000 people visiting the new event centre. Major extensions began in 1996: a multi-purpose foyer was built on the ground floor along with a congress hall on the first floor; the latter was opened on 13 February 1998.

The Stadthalle hosts congresses, conferences, presentations and various cultural and social events.

The Stadthalle Osnabrück was officially renamed the OsnabrückHalle in 2008.

== Present day ==
The OsnabrückHalle was extensively renovated from March to September 2013. Additions made during the first phase of construction included three new conference rooms, a clearly structured foyer with a new cloakroom facility and two lifts heading all the way up to the second-floor gallery. The Europasaal (Europe Hall) on the first floor was given a complete structural renovation and was kitted out with new stage machinery along with modern lighting and loudspeakers. An imposing triple-glazed glass façade offering views over the castle gardens stretches from the ground floor to the second floor. A number of bars and counters throughout the whole building, bright and friendly interior design and the provision of modern technology throughout all renovated areas rounded off the first phase of development; the OsnabrückHalle is now completely accessible to people with disabilities. During summer 2014 the artists’ cloakrooms and the administrative wing with its adjacent façade were also renovated.

== Further renovation work (2016) ==
A second phase of renovation is scheduled to take place from March to August 2016. Plans for this phase include the modernisation of the three conference rooms on the first floor, the Niedersachsen-Saal (Lower Saxony Hall) and the entire exterior façade. Renovation of the building will be complete with the conclusion of this phase.

== Links ==
- OsnabrückHalle website
