= Hannoversche Allgemeine Zeitung =

German daily newspaper

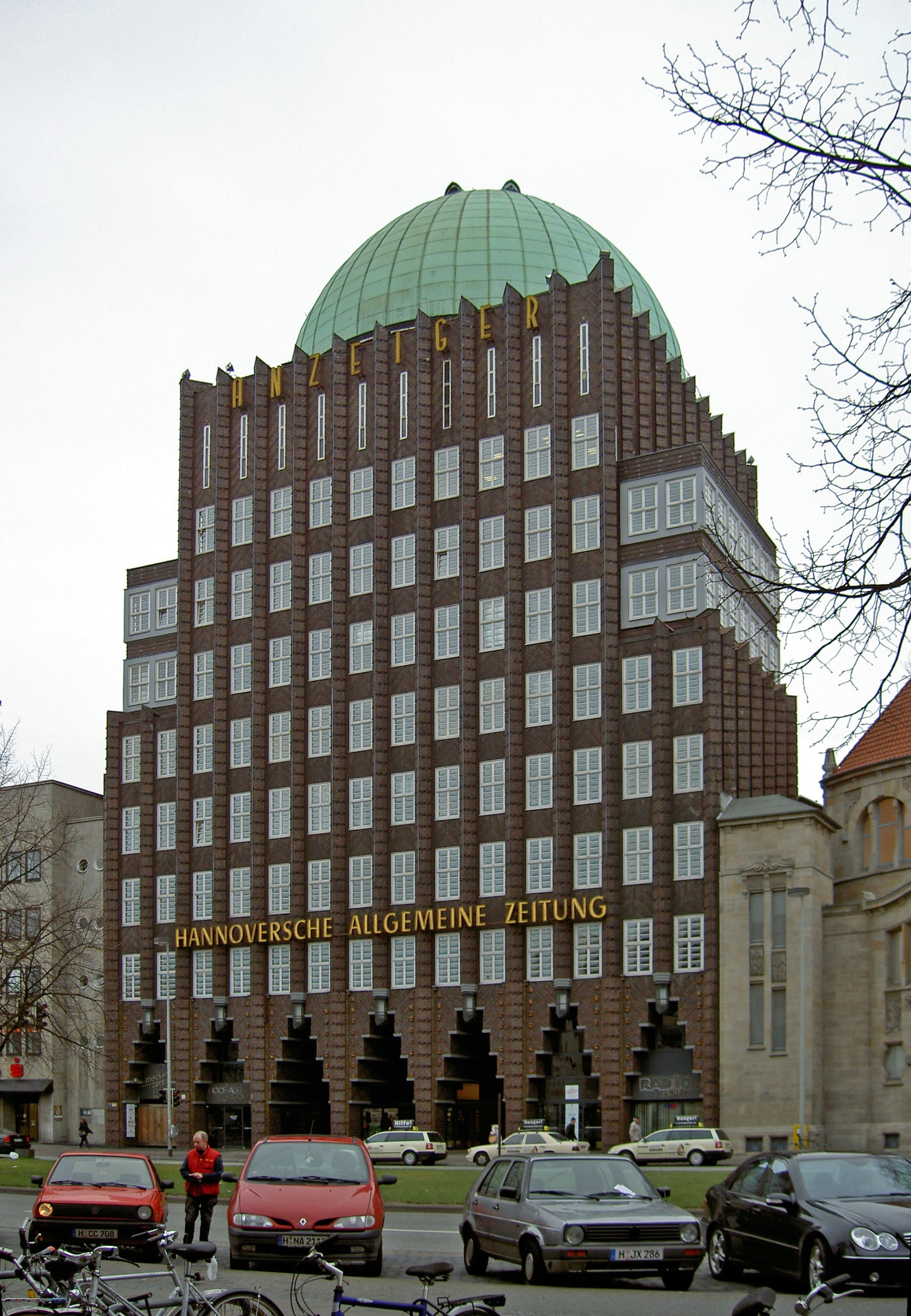
- HAZ in Anzeiger-Hochhaus

Hannoversche Allgemeine Zeitung (HAZ) is a German newspaper with a circulation of 158,000 (as of 2009) and a widespread resonance all over Germany. It is distributed in Hanover and in all Lower Saxony.

== History and profile ==
Hannoversche Zeitung was founded in 1851. Ulrich Neufert leads the HAZ as chief journalist.

HAZ is part of the Madsack Media Group.

== Editors-in-chief ==
- 1949 - 1950: Hans Lehmann
- 1950 - 1955: Adolf Halfeld
- 1955 - 1956: Bruno Lenz
- 1956: Wolfgang Höpker
- 1956 - 1957: Bruno Lenz
- 1957 - 1971: Wilhelm Plog
- 1971 - 1988: Wolfgang Wagner
- 1989 - 2005: Wolfgang Mauersberg
- 2005 - 2011: Ulrich Neufert
- 2011 - 2013: Matthias Koch and Hendrik Brandt
- 2013 - 2022: Hendrik Brandt
- since 2022: Dany Schrader
