= Tina Korhonen =

Finnish born music photographer

Tina Korhonen is a Finnish born music photographer based in the United Kingdom . She is well known for her portraits of musicians, usually in the rock, punk and heavy rock genres including Europe, Ronnie James Dio Steve Hackett, The Dresden Dolls, Peter Gabriel, Jesu, and Rodrigo y Gabriela. She has shot covers for magazines like Rolling Stone (USA) and Classic Rock and many others. She also contributes to magazines devoted to alternative culture like Total Tattoo (UK) as well as What Mobile, New York, and Dagbladet Sweden. Some of her work, like a striking portrait of Lemmy is on view in the Pipeline Bar in Hoxton. A photo by Tina of Grammy award winner Bobby Mcferrin appeared in The Guardian newspaper on 31 May 2010. She is the official photographer for Devilish Presley. Tina was one of seven photographers recently featured in a Nikon Pro feature on their website.
