= Between the Earth and the Stars (Bonnie Tyler album) =

2019 album by Bonnie Tyler

Studio album by Bonnie Tyler
- Released: 15 March 2019
- Genre: Pop rock, country rock
- Length: 48:34
- Label: earMUSIC
- Producer: David Mackay

Bonnie Tyler chronology
Rocks and Honey (2013)	Between the Earth and the Stars (2019)	The Best Is Yet to Come (2021)

Singles from Between the Earth and the Stars
- 1. "Hold On" Released: 1 February 2019

Professional ratings
Review scores
Source	Rating
Classic Rock Deutschland	7/10
Mannheimer Morgen	4/5 stars
The Spill Magazine	3/5 stars

Between the Earth and the Stars is the seventeenth studio album by Welsh singer Bonnie Tyler, released on 15 March 2019 by earMUSIC. The album was produced by David Mackay.

== Background ==
The album first came into existence when her former bass player from the 1970s Kevin Dunne, brought a set of songs he had written and wanted Tyler to sample, following discussions and work at the cash cabin studios in Nashville, the process of producing the album came to life

In October 2014, Tyler was misquoted in an interview with the Daily Sabah stating that she had begun working on her seventeenth studio album with Jim Steinman, saying, "We are choosing love songs and Jim’s melodies are amazing, we have already chosen some great rock pieces." The quotes were later removed from the original article.

Following the release of Rocks and Honey in 2013, Tyler remarked to Portugal's Kiss FM that she expected it to be her last. In 2017, she announced that she had been inspired to record another album after hearing "fantastic new songs" written for her by Kevin Dunne, who played bass guitar in her first band in the early 1970s. In December 2016, she visited the Cash Cabin Studio in Nashville to commence recording with John Carter Cash. In 2018, Tyler announced that she would instead be working with David Mackay, who co-produced her first two albums, The World Starts Tonight (1977) and Natural Force (1978). Tyler and Mackay also collaborated on Frankie Miller's album Double Take (2016).

In August 2018, The Sun falsely reported that Tyler had recorded an album of duets with Rod Stewart. Tyler clarified in another interview with Kiss FM that they had only recorded one song, later revealing the title to be "Battle of the Sexes".

The title track "Between the Earth and the Stars" was originally recorded by American singer Jeff Wood on his 1997 album of the same name. "Don't Push Your Luck" originally appeared on Lorraine Crosby's album Mrs Loud (2008). "Slow Walk" first appeared on Brian Cadd and The Bootleg Family Band album Bulletproof (2016). "Someone's Rockin' Your Heart", the album's duet with Francis Rossi of Status Quo, was originally written by Rossi and Bob Young for Status Quo's 2016 album Aquostic II: That's a Fact!, under the alternate title "Is Someone Rocking Your Heart?".

Amy Wadge gave Bonnie Tyler three tracks ("Older" from Amy Wadge 2016, "Bad for Loving You" from Walking Disaster 2018 and "To the Moon and Back" from Recovery 2014) for the album and sang background vocals.

== Artwork and packaging ==
The cover art for Between the Earth and the Stars is cropped from a photograph by Tina Korhonen. The album's title is visually represented by a circle and two stars, which appear between the text of Tyler's name and the album title.

== Promotion ==
Tyler announced that she had reunited with David Mackay on Jane McDonald and Friends in March 2018. In October, Tyler appeared on Good Morning America. She performed at the Brandenburg Gate in Berlin on 31 December 2018 to promote her new album and upcoming tour. On 22 January, Tyler's website closed, leaving a notice that read: "Check back for an exciting announcement on 31 January 2019!" Her website reopened the following day with a new design, featuring a short video documentary with previews of selected tracks and interviews with Tyler and Mackay.

=== Singles ===
On 1 February 2019, "Hold On" was released as the first single from Between the Earth and the Stars.

=== Tour ===
On 28 October 2018, Tyler announced her Between the Earth and the Stars Live Tour in support of the album. The tour began on 28 April 2019 at the Circus Krone in Munich, Germany, and concluded on 1 June 2019 at the W-Festival in Frankfurt, Germany, with a total of 23 dates in venues throughout Germany, Belgium, the Netherlands, Switzerland, Luxembourg, France and Austria.

== Track listing ==
No.	Title	Writer(s)	Length
1.	"Hold On"	Kevin Dunne; David Mackay	3:18
2.	"Battle of the Sexes" (with Rod Stewart)	Chris Norman; Geoff Carline	3:47
3.	"Slow Walk"	Brian Cadd; John Beland	3:13
4.	"Seven Waves Away"	Barry Gibb; Stephen Gibb; Ashley Gibb; Doug Emery	3:44
5.	"Someone's Rockin' Your Heart" (with Francis Rossi)	Rossi; Robert Young	3:01
6.	"Older"	Amy Wadge	3:41
7.	"Taking Control" (with Cliff Richard)	Steve Womack	3:36
8.	"Between the Earth and the Stars"	John David; Richard Wold	3:55
9.	"Don't Push Your Luck"	Stuart Emerson	3:07
10.	"To the Moon and Back"	Wadge	3:41
11.	"Bad for Loving You"	Wadge; Martie Maguire	2:57
12.	"Let's Go Crazy Tonight"	Ron Beckett; Bob Huff; Richard Klender; Ted Winchester; Mackay	3:00
13.	"Missing You"	Kevin Dunne; Mackay	3:53
14.	"Move"	Rachel Morrison; Tom E Morrison	3:41
Total length:			48:34

== Charts ==
Chart (2019)	Peak position
Austrian Albums (Ö3 Austria)	24
Belgian Albums (Ultratop Wallonia)	164
French Albums (SNEP)	181
French Albums Physiques (SNEP)	87
German Albums (Offizielle Top 100)	23
Scottish Albums (OCC)	12
Spanish Albums (PROMUSICAE)	96
Swiss Albums (Schweizer Hitparade)	11
UK Albums (OCC)	34
UK Independent Albums (OCC)	4

== Personnel ==
Credits adapted from liner notes.

=== Musicians ===
- Bonnie Tyler – lead vocals
- Rod Stewart – featured vocals (2)
- Cliff Richard – featured vocals (7)
- Francis Rossi – featured vocals (5), guitars (1, 3, 5)
- David Mackay – production (all tracks), percussion (2–3, 7-8, 12–13), backing vocals (4), strings (7), drum programming (11, 14), keyboards (1), acoustic bass (3), bass (4, 10), piano (6, 10), synths (4, 7, 13), backing vocals (3)
- Richard Cottle – percussion (1, 4), keyboards (2, 11–12), saxophone (2, 13), tenor saxophone (3, 9), bass (6), synths (6)
- Laurence Cottle – bass (2, 5, 11–12), trombone (2–3, 9), electric bass (3), synths (4)
- Kevin Dunne – bass (1, 13), guitars (13)
- Miriam Stockley – backing vocals (1, 4, 7–8)
- Bob Jenkins – drums (1, 8, 13)
- Ray Russell – guitars (1)
- Bob Huff – guitars (1, 12–13)
- Francis Rossi – guitars (1, 3)
- Geoff Whitehorn – guitars (2–3, 7, 11–12)
- Leon Cave – drums (2, 5, 12)
- Miriam Grey – backing vocals (2)
- Claire McInerney – baritone saxophone (2–3, 9)
- Nichol Thomson – trombone (2–3, 9)
- Tom Walsh – trumpet (2–3, 9)
- Adam Linsley – trumpet (2–3, 9)
- Daz Shields – drums (3), backing vocals (3), extra percussion (11, 14)
- Brian Cadd – backing vocals (3)
- Paul Hirsch – keyboards (5)
- Amy Newhouse-Smith – backing vocals (5)
- Amy Wadge – backing vocals (6, 10–11)
- Alex Toff – drums (7)
- Matt Prior – guitars (7, 10)
- Ian Stuart Lynn – piano (8), strings (8, 10), bass (8), synths (10)
- Stuart Emerson – percussion (9), backing vocals (9)
- Lorraine Crosby – backing vocals (9)
- Tom E Morrison – guitars (14), keyboards (14), bass (14), drum programming (14)
- Claudio Corona – organ (14)

=== Technical ===
- David Mackay – recording, mixing
- Jerry Stevenson – mastering

=== Design ===
- Patchwork Associates; Jackie Campbell, Katie Etherington and Phil Rossiter – artwork design
- Tina Korhonen – photography

== Release history ==
Region	Date	Format(s)	Label	Ref.
France	15 March 2019	CD; Digital download	earMUSIC	
Germany	15 March 2019	CD; Digital download	earMUSIC	
Italy	15 March 2019	CD; Digital download	earMUSIC	
Australia	22 March 2019	CD; Digital download	earMUSIC	
Spain	22 March 2019	CD; Digital download	earMUSIC	
United Kingdom	22 March 2019	CD; Digital download	earMUSIC	
United States	12 April 2019	Digital download	Fourth Chord Records	
Canada	12 April 2019	Digital download	Fourth Chord Records	
Various	9 October 2020	Vinyl	earMUSIC	
United States	20 October 2020	Digital download	earMUSIC	
Canada	20 October 2020	Digital download	earMUSIC	
United States	16 September 2022	CD	earMUSIC	
Canada	16 September 2022	CD	earMUSIC	
