= Kieler Nachrichten =

Coordinates: 54°19′17″N 10°08′03″E

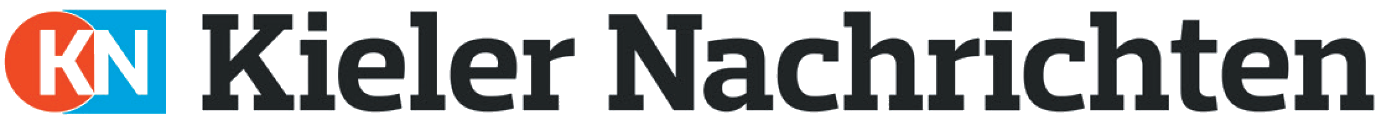
- Publisher: Kieler Zeitung Verlags und Druckerei KG-GmbH & Co
- Headquarters: Kiel
- Country: Germany
- OCLC number: 44260537
- Website: www.kn-online.de

The Kieler Nachrichten (literally "Kiel's News") or KN is the only German-language newspaper published in Kiel, Germany. It is published by "Kieler Zeitung Verlags und Druckerei KG-GmbH & Co.", a subdivision of Axel Springer AG which owns 24.5 percent of the company. The newspaper's office is located at Asmus-Bremer-Platz between Holstenstraße and the Kiel city hall.

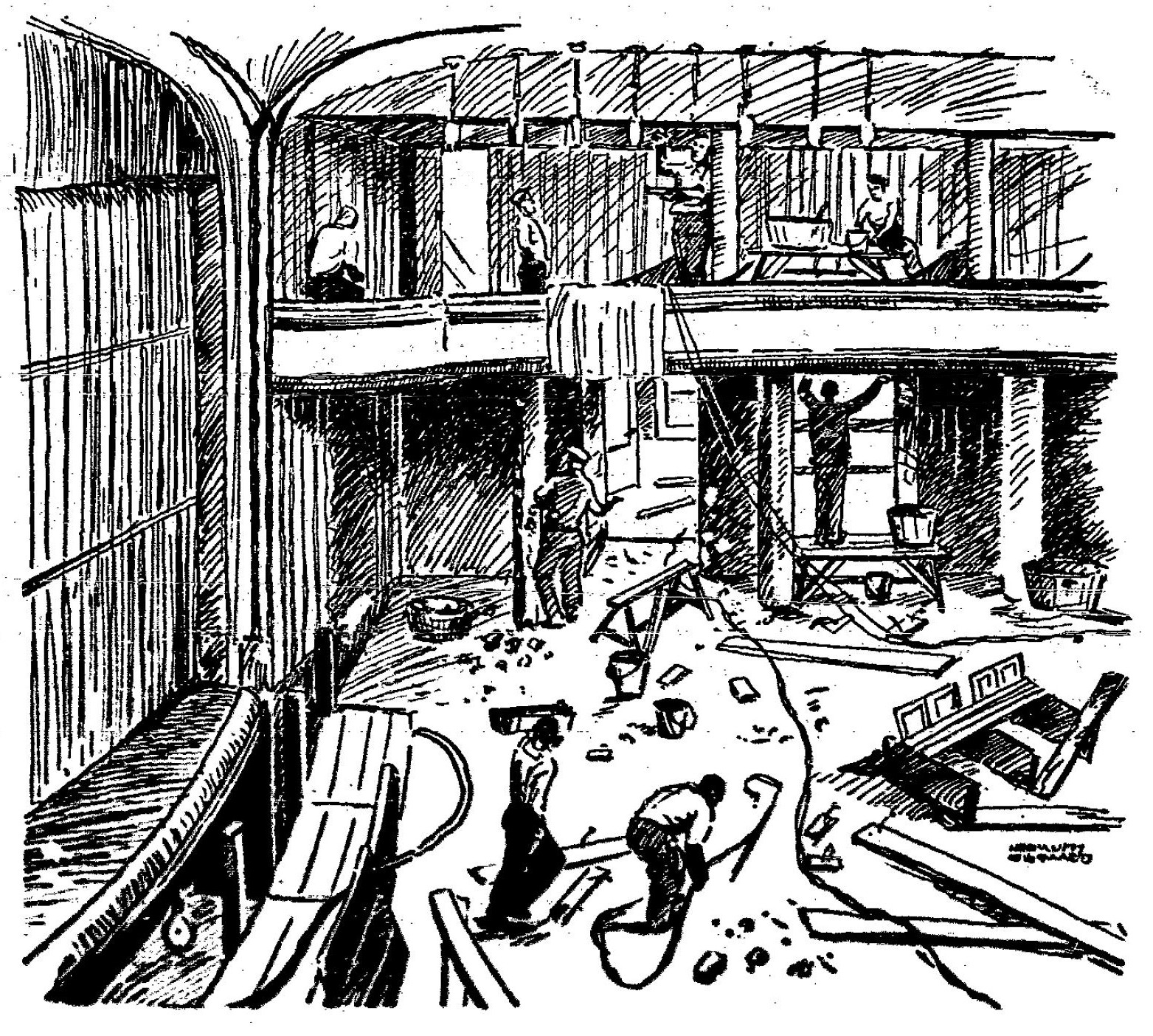
1935 illustration by Helmuth Ellgaard in the Kieler Neueste Nachrichten, to which the post-WWII paper is a successor.

The KN was first published on 3 April 1946, with the permission of the British in occupied Germany after World War II. The newspaper later considered itself a successor to the Kieler Zeitung (founded 1864) and the Kieler Neueste Nachrichten (founded 1894).

In Rötger Feldmann's comic Werner, the KN is known as the Kieler Nachtwächter ("Kiel's Night Watchman").
