= Radio in South Sudan =

Radio is the main source of news and information in South Sudan.

== Radio History ==
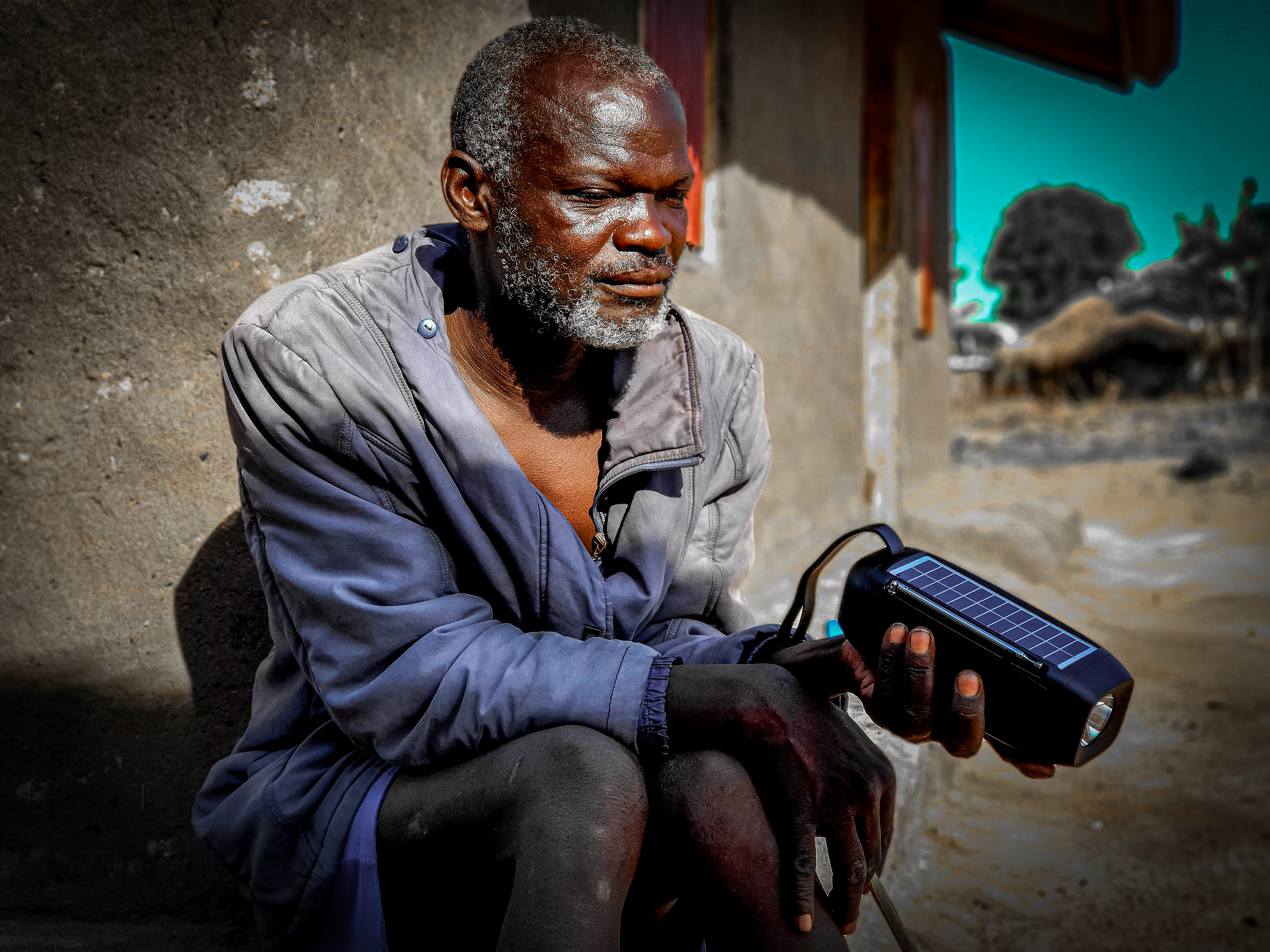
A South Sudanese man listening to radio at his home

According to surveys conducted by the Fondation Hirondelle and USAID, radio is the most widely used and trusted source of information in the country. Radio listening is considered a social activity. Since the Comprehensive Peace Agreement of 2005, over 30 FM radio stations have been set up across the country with the encouragement of the Sudan People’s Liberation Movement (SPLM) run government. Radio networks and stations are run and funded by Churches, community organizations, international NGOs, and private businesses.

The UN radio station Radio Mirraya, set up in 2006 by the United Nations Mission in Sudan (UNMIS) in partnership with Foundation Hirondelle, has a wider geographic reach than any other FM station in South Sudan. The station is financed by the governments of the Netherlands, Switzerland and Sweden. During the first five years of its activity, Radio Mirraya maintained a newsroom in Khartoum, however, it ceased all activity in the north following South Sudan’s independence in July 2011 and permanently relocated to Juba. Most of its programming is in English, Arabic, and Simple Arabic and it carries regular news bulletins in English and Simple Arabic. Some programs use other African languages such as Dinka, Nuer, Lutuka, and Lovo.

There are four main radio networks with broad coverage in South Sudan. The South Sudan Radio Network is controlled by the government of South Sudan and has set up FM stations in nine out of ten of the country’s state capitals. Some of the individual stations are owned by the government of the state where they are situated, however, all are managed underneath the umbrella of the South Sudan Radio Network. The studio facilities of government FM stations are generally primitive and some broadcast for only four to six hours a day. Radio Juba is the flagship station for the network. Other stations include Radio Wau, Radio Malakal, and Radio Rumbek. Most programs are in English and Simple Arabic with some use of African languages such as Zande, Madi, Muru, Bari, and Kuhu.

The Catholic Radio Network was set up in 2006 by the Comboni Missionary Institutes and Sudan Catholic Bishops Conference. This Network consists of nine radio stations linked to the Roman Catholic Church with a common news desk in Juba and a training center in Wau. Eight of the radio stations are in South Sudan and one is in the disputed Nuba Mountains area of South Kordofan State in Sudan. Radio Bakhita was the first radio station to go on air under the CRN and other stations include Radio Emmanuel, Saut al Mahabba and Voice of Peace. The Catholic Radio Network's Voice of Love in Malakal went off-air amid violence in Malakal in early 2014. Two radio stations were also destroyed in the Jonglei State capital Bor soon after the outbreak of South Sudan's civil war.

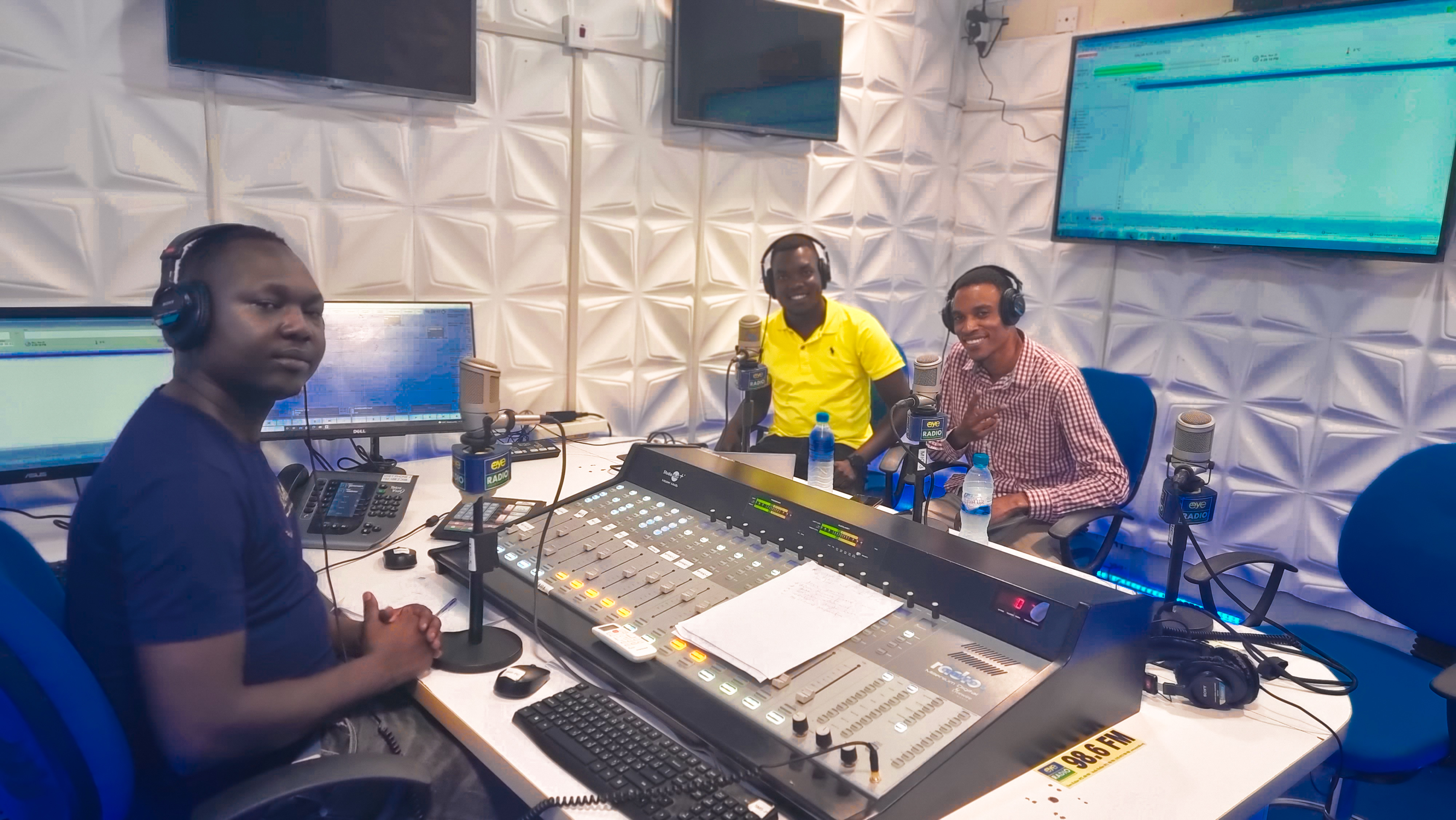
Presenter Okot and guests in the Radio station.

Sudan Radio Service was a shortwave broadcaster that is based in Nairobi, but since it established an FM station in Juba in 2010, most of its program making has been transferred to South Sudan. As well as Nairobi and Juba, the network also had a newsroom in Khartoum and broadcasts to both Sudan and South Sudan. In 2010, SRS entered into a partnership with the University of Khartoum to set up a course on broadcast journalism which will lead to a Certificate in Broadcast Journalism, the first training qualification to exist in South Sudan. Management of the radio station set up in Juba by SRS, Eye Radio was later taken over by Internews. The US-based and USAID financed Internews media development organization also set up six radio stations in conflict-sensitive areas, all of which operate under a loose network supported by the organization’s main office in Juba. Four of the stations are located in remote conflict-sensitive areas in South Sudan and the two others are located in the disputed territories of Kauda in the Nuba Mountains and Kurmuk in the Blue Nile State, north of the internationally recognized border of South Sudan. However, the Kurmuk station went off-air in 2011 following an outbreak of fighting in Blue Nile State.

Radio Tamazuj is a daily news service and current affairs broadcaster covering South Sudan, the southern states of Sudan, and the borderlands between the two countries. Our typical programming includes reporting and discussion of politics, governance, peace-building, law, justice, culture, economy, education, gender, and human rights.

Radio Tamazuj operates on shortwave during morning and evening time slots only, broadcasting in local dialect Arabic.

BBC World Service operates FM relay transmitters in Juba, Wau, and Malakal. BBC Arabic can be heard on 90.0 MHz. Additionally, BBC English is transmitted on 88.2 MHz in Juba.

Access Radio is a new independent community radio station that was launched in Yei River County of Central Equatoria State in November 2020. It transmits on 88.8 FM and covers Lainya, Yei, Morobo, Kajo-Keji, Terekeka and parts of Juba Counties.

== Radio programs ==
- Sawa Shabab
