= Mass media in South Sudan =

The mass media in South Sudan is underdeveloped compared to many other countries, including fellow East African states like Kenya, Tanzania, and Uganda. Poor transportation infrastructure and entrenched poverty in the country inhibit both the circulation of newspapers, particularly in states located far from the capital of Juba, and the ability of media outlets to maintain regular coverage of the entire country.

South Sudan nonetheless has several indigenous media outlets and a host of active journalists.

== Media freedom ==
Following the Comprehensive Peace Agreement in 2005, the constitution of the newly autonomous South Sudan guarantees press freedom and ensures that all levels of government uphold the principle. Three progressive media bills were introduced in 2007 but were not enacted until the end of 2011, leaving journalists in that period without comprehensive legal protections and the media sector without a regulatory framework.

According to former Information Minister Dr. Barnaba Marial Benjamin, the South Sudanese government guarantees freedom of the press, a significant difference from the neighboring Republic of the Sudan from which the South gained independence in July 2011. However, journalists including the editors of both The Citizen and The Juba Post have alleged harassment, abuse, and de facto censorship at the hands of the Sudan People's Liberation Army/Movement as recently as in the months leading up to independence, and the government has been known to confiscate newspapers and threaten radio stations with closure. The distribution of Arabic-language publications in South Sudan has also allegedly been restricted and outright banned at turns.

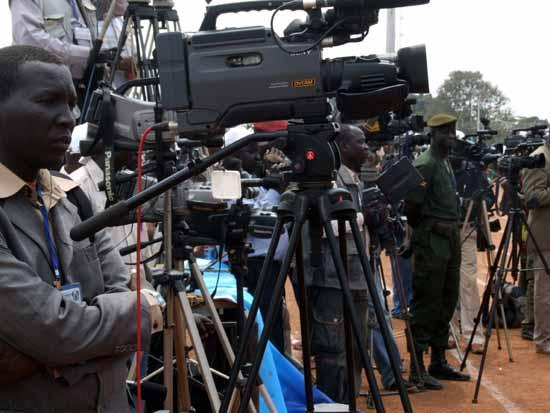
South Sudan Journalists covering a press conference in the capital Juba.

Days after South Sudan gained independence, the Sudanese government banned the transportation of newspapers between the two countries and shut down publications and news bureaus owned by South Sudanese in the North, including the Khartoum bureau of The Juba Post.

South Sudan was ranked 124th in the Reporters Without Borders Press Freedom Index in 2013, falling by twelve places since 2012. Reporters Without Borders cited the murder of Isaiah Diing Abraham Chan Awuol, who was shot dead by an unidentified man on December 12, 2012, as the reason for the country's fall in ranking.

In 2014, Human Rights Watch and Amnesty International released a joint report about media freedom in South Sudan. The report, titled "The Price of Silence: Freedom of Expression Under Attack in South Sudan," accuses the National Security Service of harassing and detaining journalists.

== Radio ==
- Radios in South Sudan

Radio is the main source of news and information in South Sudan. Since the Comprehensive Peace Agreement of 2005, over 30 FM radio stations have been set up across the country with the encouragement of the Sudan People’s Liberation Movement (SPLM) run government. Radio networks and stations are run and funded by Churches, community organizations, international NGOs and private businesses.

== Television ==
- See Also: Television in South Sudan

The government-run South Sudan Broadcasting Corporation Television (SSBC TV) is based in Juba. The SSBC TV broadcasts 15 hours a day in English and Arabic and can also be viewed on Satellite. The station runs a few small local TV stations in Aweil, Wau, Malakal and Rumbek. South Africa provides training for SSBC TV staff.

In 2013, the owners of The Citizen daily newspaper launched The Citizen Television (CTV) station broadcasting from the capital, Juba, for five hours each evening. However, in September 2015 the editor-in-chief of The Citizen Nhial Bol announced he was resigning and shutting down the newspaper and TV station after government security agents shut down his newspaper's premises, while receiving death threats.

The Republic South Sudan has another TV station called JunobnaTV established in 2017 by Adil Faris Mayat, a former Al Jazeera reporter, along with businessman Sebet Dok and other shareholders, JunobnaTV broadcasts 24 hours/day on Nilesat focusing on social, youth and sport related content and it has stopped the live broadcast service and resumed many times since but has never stopped operating on or delivering other media services. JunobnaTV is located in Juba Hai Malakal and its official website is www.junobnatv.net.

Channel	Language	Establishment	Hub
South Sudan Broadcasting Corporation Television	English; Juba Arabic	2010	Juba
Junobna TV	English Arabic	2017	Juba

== News publications and outlets ==
Newspapers in South Sudan circulate almost exclusively among the educated elite in urban areas and very few copies reach rural villages. Nearly all newspapers are published in English and as of early 2012, most, such as the Southern Eye, were printed in Kampala or Nairobi and flown into Juba for delivery. South Sudan has two printing presses capable of printing newspapers, one is owned by the government and the other is owned by the daily newspaper The Citizen.

The Citizen and the Juba Monitor, both of which are produced and printed in Juba, are the country’s only daily newspapers. The Citizen was initially founded by a former journalist of the Khartoum Monitor in Sudan and became South Sudan’s first daily newspaper when it transferred all of its operations from Khartoum to Juba. The Juba Monitor was launched in 2011 and is owned by a former BBC correspondent in Khartoum.

The bi-weekly Juba Post is edited by a team of journalists in Juba but is printed in Khartoum. It is the only South Sudan newspaper that is still widely sold in Khartoum. The Sudan Mirror is another bi-weekly newspaper that is produced and printed in Nairobi. Al-Maseer newspaper was the first Arabic-language newspaper to be published in South Sudan and was launched in February 2011. This newspaper was aimed at South Sudanese returning from Khartoum and proved to be very popular with the Arabic-speaking South Sudanese. Following disagreement over share distribution, this first Arabic language daily ceased publication on Tuesday 10 June 2014. Most of the editorial staff then came together to launch a new Arabic-language daily, Al-Maugif, with its first issue hitting the stands on Saturday 14 June 2014.

SHE South Sudan magazine was an independent magazine providing information and entertainment to the women of South Sudan.

In niche online news publishing, Jakony Media Agency is the first and only local business news website covering all states in South Sudan.

Several South Sudanese led news organisations cover South Sudan from abroad. These include Radio Tamazuj, Sudan Post, South Sudan News Agency, and Sudan Tribune.

Some other newly created online media outlets includes Talk of Juba, Hot in Juba, Nyamilepedia Press, Jakony Media Agency and The South Sudan Friendship Press. Many of these upcoming media are also operated outside the country.

== List of Media Outlets in South Sudan ==
=== The Press ===
- The Citizen – a private daily paper for the capital, Juba (Not Operational)
- Jakony Media Agency – the only local daily business news website
- The City Review daily English News paper. The City Review is a Juba-based South Sudanese newspaper legally registered with the South Sudan Media Authority, a national media regulatory body. (Operational)
- No.1 Citizens daily English News Paper (Operational)
- The Dawn daily English News Paper (Operational)
- Juba Monitor – a government-owned daily paper for the capital, Juba (Not Operational)
- The Juba Post (Not Operational)
- Al Watan Arabic News Paper (Not Operational)
- Al Hagiga Arabic News Paper (Operational)
- Sudan Mirror – a privately owned paper (Not Operational)
- Al-Maugif – a privately owned paper (Operational)

=== Television ===
- South Sudan Broadcasting Corporation Television (SSBC TV) – a government-run television station
- Juba Echo TV
- Ebony TV – based in South Sudan
- Equator Broadcasting Corporation
- Junobna TV – An online television station.
- Independence TV – An online television station.

=== Radio ===
- South Sudan Broadcasting Corporation Radio – government-run radio station
- Radio Miraya – UN owned station based in Juba
- Radio Bakhita – own by Catholic Radio Network based in Juba
- Advance Youth Radio – Juba based radio station run by a local NGO, Advance South Sudan
- 88.4 City FM – A commercial radio station run by Data Media in Juba
- Radio Tamazuj – A shortwave radio broadcaster funded by Netherlands-based Free Press Unlimited
- Eye Radio – a private radio station based in Juba
- Radio Dabanga – Sudanese shortwave radio station, TV and online news magazine
- Access Radio 88.8 Fm – An independent community owned radio station in Yei River County

=== News Agencies/Internet ===
Newspaper	First issued	Languages	Ownership	Website
One Citizen Daily	2019	English	Number One Citizen Daily Newspaper, LLC	onecitizendaily.com
The City Review	2019	English	(Independent Press)	cityreviewss.com//
EyeRadio		English	EyeRadio Network, LLC	www.eyeradio.org
Nile Citizens	2019	English	(Independent Press)	nilecitizens.com
Northern Corridor Morning Post	2019	English	NCMP, LLC	ncmorningpost.com
Sudan Tribune	2003	English	Sudan Tribune, LLC	sudantribune.com
Sudans Post	Dec. 2019	English, Arabic	Sudans Post, LLC	www.sudanspost.com
South Sudan News Agency	2010	English	South Sudan News Agency, LLC	ssnanews.com
Jakony Business News	2025	English	Jakony Media Agency	jakony.com

=== Online Blogs ===
- Hot in Juba, an English-language news site based in Juba, South Sudan
- Talk of Juba, an English-language news site based in Juba, South Sudan
- Juba TV
- New Sudan Vision (06–19), was an English language news site based in Canada.
- Pachodo.org an English digital news site based in Kodok.
- Nilotics Daily
- South Sudan Friendship Press – an English language news and opinion site based in Juba.
- Jakony Media Agency – an online English language business news website and portal covering South Sudan.
- ToritTimes – an English digital news site based in Torit.
- ImotongPost – an English digital news site based in Torit.

=== Unreliable ===
- Nyamilepedia – an English-language news site based in Vancouver, Canada. Nyamilepedia is described as a "pro-armed [SPLM] opposition" following a false report about the United Nations Mission in South Sudan.

== See also ==
- Television in South Sudan
- Radio in South Sudan
