= Telecommunications in South Sudan =

- Location: South Sudan

Telecommunications in South Sudan includes fixed and mobile telephony, the Internet, radio, and television. Despite this progress, South Sudan remains one of the least connected countries globally, with limited infrastructure, high costs, and significant rural–urban disparities in access.

South Sudan's telecommunications sector is dominated by mobile services, with minimal fixed-line infrastructure. Growth has accelerated in recent years due to increased investment and regulatory reforms.

As of early 2025, there were approximately 4.47 million mobile connections, representing about 37% of the population. By late 2025, this figure had risen to about 5.89 million connections (48.1% of the population), indicating rapid expansion of mobile access.

Internet usage remains relatively low but is growing. In 2025, the number of internet users ranged between 1.6 million and 1.9 million, corresponding to an estimated penetration rate of 13% to 16% of the population.

== Regulation and Policy ==
The telecommunications sector is regulated by the National Communication Authority (NCA), established under the Communications Act of 2012. The NCA oversees licensing, spectrum management, and pricing regulation.

In April 2024, the NCA issued a 30-day ultimatum for all unlicensed satellite service providers operating in the country to register for compliance, warning that failure to do so could result in legal enforcement actions, including fines or equipment seizure.

In mid‑2024, following two years of negotiations, the NCA granted Starlink (SpaceX’s satellite internet provider) a Satellite Landing Rights License and a Provisional Service License, marking a major milestone in the country’s telecom regulation. The regulator subsequently approved official tariffs for Starlink services, structuring four pricing tiers (ranging from $38.19 to $5,005.40 monthly) aligned with demand and affordability goals, and mandated local distribution through officially licensed agents.

== Telephone ==
South Sudan’s telephone system is primarily mobile-based, with limited fixed-line infrastructure.

- Calling code: +211
- International call prefix: 00
- Main lines: Limited
- Mobile cellular: Primary mode of communication
- Domestic network: Wireless and satellite-based
- International connectivity: Satellite links and emerging fibre connections

=== Mobile network operators ===
Operator	Licence date	Technology	Subscribers	Status
Zain South Sudan	1 October 2011	GSM / UMTS / LTE	~1,050,000	Operational
MTN South Sudan	1 October 2011	GSM / UMTS / LTE	~1,700,000	Operational
Gamtel South Sudan	1 October 2011	GSM	Unknown	Inactive
Vivacell	1 October 2011	GSM / UMTS	Unknown	Suspended (2018)
Digitel South Sudan	13 July 2021	GSM / UMTS / LTE	Unknown	Operational

== Internet ==
Internet access in South Sudan is primarily delivered via mobile broadband and satellite services.

- Country code top-level domain (ccTLD): .ss
- Users: ~1.6–1.9 million (2025)
- Penetration rate: ~13–16% of population

The sector has experienced steady growth, with internet users increasing from approximately 1.3 million in 2024 to about 1.9 million in 2025.

However, access remains constrained by high costs, limited infrastructure, and low digital literacy. An estimated 80%–85% of the population remains offline, highlighting a significant digital divide.

== Radio and television ==
- Radio: Radio is the main source of news and information in South Sudan. Since the Comprehensive Peace Agreement of 2005, over 30 FM radio stations have been set up across the country with the encouragement of the Sudan People’s Liberation Movement (SPLM) run government. Radio networks and stations are run and funded by Government, Churches, community organizations, international NGOs and private businesses.
- Radio sets:
- TV: The government-run SSBC TV is based in Juba. It is the only functioning television station in the country. The SSBC TV broadcasts six hours a day in English and Arabic and can also be viewed on Satellite. The station runs a few small local TV stations in Aweil, Wau, Malakal and Rumbek. South Africa provides training for SSBC TV staff.
- TV sets:

== See also ==
- Media of South Sudan, includes information on radio, television, and newspapers.
