= Television in South Sudan =

Television in South Sudan has a low penetration of around 15% to 20%, as many households cannot afford the cost of a satellite dish, and terrestrial television is the dominant platform. Radio became the main source of news and information in South Sudan.

== List of channels ==
Position	Channel	Owner	Year established
1	South Sudan Broadcasting Corporation Television (SSBC TV)	South Sudan Broadcasting Corporation	2005
2	Equator Broadcasting Corporation Television (EBCTV)	Equator Broadcasting Corporation	2015
3	Ebony TV	Unknown	2011

== List of defunct channels ==
In 2013, the owners of The Citizen daily newspaper launched The Citizen Television (CTV) station broadcasting from the capital, Juba, for five hours each evening. However, in September 2015 the Editor-in-Chief of The Citizen Nhial Bol announced he was resigning and shutting down the newspaper and TV station after government security agents shut down his newspaper's premises, while receiving death threats.

Year established	Channel	Group	Year dissolved
2013	The Citizen Television (CTV)	The Citizen	2015

== See also ==
- Media of South Sudan
