= Talent Search =

Talent Search may refer to:

- A*STAR Talent Search, a research-based science competition in Singapore for high school students
- Intel Science Talent Search, formerly known as Westinghouse Science Talent Search, a research-based science competition in the United States for high school students
- Talent Search South Sudan, a television music competition in South Sudan
- Talent Search (TRIO), part of the US government's TRIO (program) outreach and student services program
