= Apollonia Mathia =

Journalist, radio broadcaster, human rights activist

- Born: Apollonia Adong Mathia
- Died: 18 March 2011; Juba
- Occupation: Journalist
- Notable work: Founder, AMWISS, UJOSS

Apollonia Mathia (died 18 March 2011) was a South Sudanese journalist and social activist. Mathia was one of the founders of the Association for Media Women in South Sudan (AMWISS) as well as Union of Journalists of Southern Sudan (UJOSS).

== Background and education ==
Mathia was born in the 1950s. She spent her childhood in northern Uganda before relocating to Juba.

== Career ==
Before she joined the Ministry of Finance as a secretary in 1978, Mathia worked as an Information Manager at the Catholic Church. She later quit to join the Juba Post where she was the only female editor and Managing editor. She left the Juba Post in 2008 and joined the BBC Monitoring Service as their correspondent in South Sudan.

Mathia worked at a number of jobs and helped found the Union of Journalists of Southern Sudan (UJOSS). She also worked as a consultant at South Sudan's World Bank Micro-finance investment department.

At the time of her death in 2011, Mathia was Executive Director of the Association for Media Women in South Sudan (AMWISS) which she had helped co-found in 2008 alongside Veronica Lucy Gordon and others

== Death ==
On 18 March 2011, Mathia died as a result of an accident when a motorcycle she was on was crushed by a lorry.

== See also ==
- Anna Nimiriano
- Veronica Lucy Gordon
- Juba Post
- Mass media in South Sudan
