= Association of Media Women in South Sudan =

Women's organization in South Sudan

- "Gives Women Voice"
- Abbreviation: AMWISS
- Formation: 2008
- Purpose: equip female journalists to become professionals and understand better their career.
- Headquarters: Juba, South Sudan
- President: Veronica Lucy Gordon

The Association of Media Women in South Sudan (AMWISS) is a professional body established in 2008 to promote gender equality and the advancement of women in South Sudan's media industry. The aim is to equip female journalists to become professionals and understand better their career. It delivers journalism training, advocacy, and safety programs specifically tailored to female media practitioners, aiming to amplify women’s voices in public discourse.

== Partnerships & Collaborations ==
AMWISS partners with institutions such as:

- Association for Media Development in South Sudan (AMDISS) –for joint training and advocacy
- Norwegian People’s Aid & International Media Support
- JMEC & South Sudan Women Empowerment Network

== Founders ==
- Apollonia Mathia, a journalist and social activist, also a co-founder of AMWISS and union of Journalists of Southern Sudan (UJOSS)
- Veronica Lucy Gordon , a journalist, and the co-founder of Association of Media Women in South Sudan(AMWISS)
