= Anna Nimiriano =

South Sudanese journalist

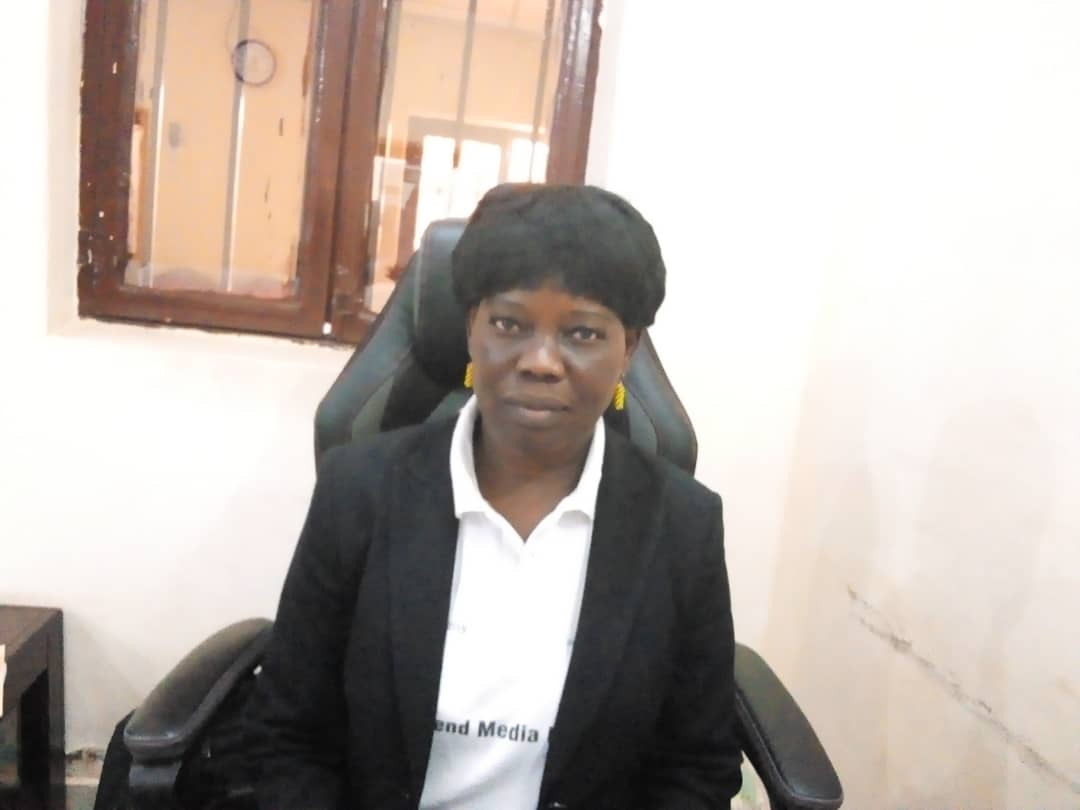
- Anna Nimiriano, March 2022
- Education: University of Juba, Institute of Theology for the Laity
- Occupation: Journalist
- Years active: 2006–present
- Known for: Journalism, activism

Anna Nimiriano (at times referred to as Anna Nimiriano Nunu Siya) is a South Sudanese journalist who is the co-founder and editor-in-chief of the Juba Monitor. Nimiriano is South Sudan's only female Editor-in-Chief and was the winner of the Women in News Editorial Leadership Award 2019 Africa (WAN-IFRA 2019 Africa Laureate).

== Background and education ==
Nimiriano obtained a Bachelor of Arts degree in Community Studies and Rural Development from the University of Juba. She also has a Diploma in Theology, from the Institute of Theology for the Laity. In addition, Nimiriano "has attended several local and international media training workshops in Kenya, Uganda, Washington DC, Sierra Leone, Djibouti, Tanzania, China and India".

== Career ==
While at university, Nimiriano wrote opinion pieces and commentaries for the now defunct Khartoum Monitor and after her studies in 2006, she joined the paper as an editorial director and subsequently, its Managing Editor. The paper was renamed Juba Monitor in 2000 and she became one of the latter's founders.

In 2017, Nimiriano was appointed the Editor-in-chief of the Juba Monitor making her the only female Editor-in-Chief in South Sudan. She replaced Alfred Taban who quit the position after being appointed Member of Parliament for Kajo-Keji

Nimiriano is a member of is a member of the National Editors’ Forum (NEF) in South Sudan. In this capacity, she represented the media during the high level Revitalized Peace Agreement Forum in South Sudan

== Awards and recognition ==
In 2019, Nimiriano received 2 awards – she was named the WAN-IFRA Africa Laureate in addition to receiving the 2019 Courage in Journalism Award.

She was named on 8th on Fortune magazine's 2019 list of the world's 50th greatest leaders. Avance Media also listed her among the 100 Most Influential African Women in 2020.

== See also ==
- Alfred Taban
- Khartoum Monitor
- Mass media in South Sudan
- Human rights in South Sudan
