= Alfred Taban =

South Sudanese broadcast journalist (1957–2019)

Alfred Taban Logune (1957, Kajokeji – 27 April 2019, Kampala) was a South Sudanese broadcast journalist.

== Career ==
He was a former BBC's correspondent in Khartoum. He was the founder and former editor in chief of the Juba Monitor, the leading independent newspaper in South Sudan, formerly known as Khartoum Monitor the 1st independent English-Language Newspaper in the Sudan. Taban was also the former chairman of The Association for Media Development in South Sudan AMDISS. At the time of his death he was serving as the member of parliament in the South Sudan transitional legislative national assembly.

Having trained as a laboratory technician, Taban embarked on a career in journalism. He was detained by the authorities for 5 days in April 2001 while covering a news conference by church leaders in Khartoum, who were protesting against the cancellation of a service and the arrest of up to one hundred Christians.

In July 2005, Speaker of the British House of Commons Michael Martin presented the Speaker Abbot award to Alfred Taban, in recognition of his work exposing the slaughter in Darfur. This award is awarded to the journalist who has made the greatest contribution internationally to the "protection, promotion and perpetuation of parliamentary democracy". In 2006, Taban was one of three recipients to be presented with the National Endowment for Democracy award by US president George W. Bush.

On 30 October 2006, Taban was summoned and stated that he was liable for the content of a newspaper article dated 14 September 2006, which claimed that foreign minister, state minister for foreign affairs and the director of information and public relations, Lam Akol, are mouthpieces and perpetrators of genocide as well as Islamic extremists etc. It was argued that the article was general criticism and personal opinion of its author. In addition to the published reprimand, a penalty was imposed.

In July 2016 Taban published a column calling on President Salva Kiir and Vice-President Riek Machar to step down for failing to improve the security situation in Juba. On the following day he was arrested and held for several days without charge.

Taban later became an Honorable member of parliament in the south Sudan transitional national legislative assembly and a member of national dialogue steering committee. He died on 27 April 2019 in Kampala.
