= Veronica Lucy Gordon =

Journalist, radio broadcaster, human rights activist

- Education: Juba University
- Occupations: Journalist, radio broadcaster
- Years active: 1983 - present
- Notable work: Founder, AMWISS

Veronica Lucy Gordon is a South Sudanese journalist, radio broadcaster and rights activist who is the co-founder of the Association of Media Women in South Sudan (AMWISS). In 2014, she became the first female executive board member of the Association for Media Development of South Sudan (AMDISS).

== Background and education ==
Gordon has a Diploma in Community Studies and Rural Development which she obtained from Juba University. She also underwent a six month training on reporting for newspapers and photography and this was sponsored by Hirondele and the BBC Trust.

Her passion for addressing gender disparities in media emerged in her secondary school years, when she published reports in a school newspaper to highlight the underrepresentation of women in her community. This early leadership laid the foundation for her later career, including her role in founding the Association of Media Women in South Sudan (AMWISS) and championing women’s voices in national media.

== Career ==
Gordon was a newspaper columnist with the Nile Mirror Newspaper in 1983 and mainly reported on girls' education.

Between 1985 and 2000, Gordon worked at the Sudan National Broadcasting Cooperation from which she was forcibly retired. She then joined the Coordination Council for the Southern States, which had been founded by Riek Machar. In 2006, she was working as a producer and translator of programs for Free Voice radio.

In 2006, alongside the late Apollonia Mathia and others, Gordon co-founded the Association of Media Women in South Sudan (AMWISS) while also acting as a Director at South Sudan Radio (2012).

In 2014, Gordon was elected the first female deputy chairperson of the Association for Media Development in South Sudan (AMDISS).

== See also ==
- Apollonia Mathia
- Mass media in South Sudan
- Human rights in South Sudan
