= Ayaa Irene Lokang =

South Sudanese journalist

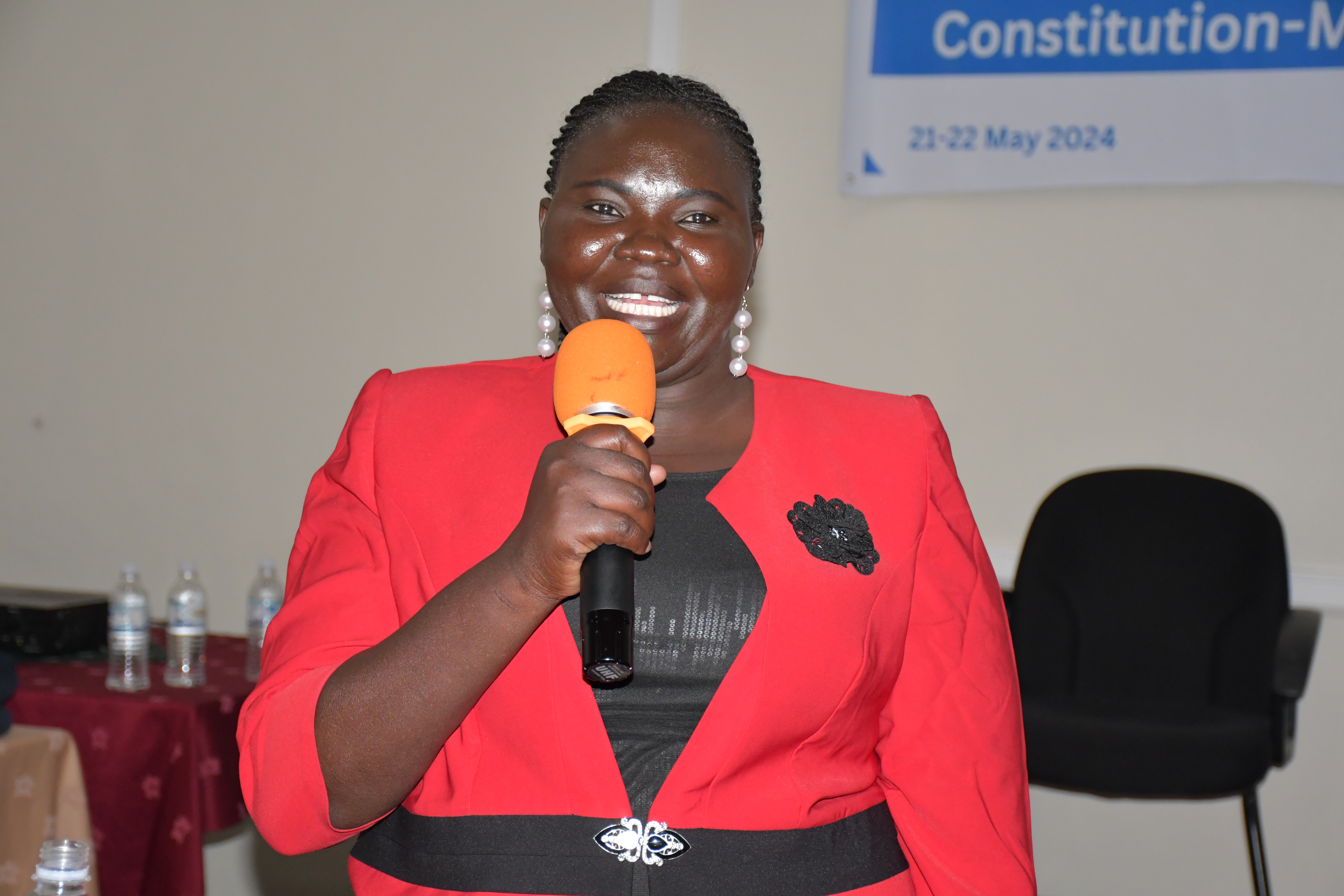
Ayaa Irene, the Director of AMDISS giving opening remarks on Constitutional-Making Process workshop in Quality Hotel, Juba_South Sudan

Ayaa Irene Lokang, a South Sudanese female Journalist and a Media Right Activist born on 8 May 1985.

Irene currently serves as the Director of the Association for Media Development in South Sudan (AMDISS), a media right Advocacy national organization as of 2025

== Education background ==
Ayaa Irene studied her secondary school at City View High School and later joins Kampala International University (KIU) where she graduated with a bachelor's degree in Mass Communication in 2010.

Ayaa holds a bachelor's degree in Mass Communication from Kampala International University (KIU) and has worked as a freelance journalist for print media.

== Work ==
Ayaa Irene has worked as a Media Development Officer for Association for Media Development in South Sudan (AMDISS) from 2012 to 2017.

From 2018 to 2019 she became the Acting Principal of Media Development Institute (MDI), a training of journalists under the auspice of Association for Media Development in South Sudan (AMDISS).

In 2020, she became the Principal of Media Development Institute (MDI), the training of AMDISS where she served for about 4 years.

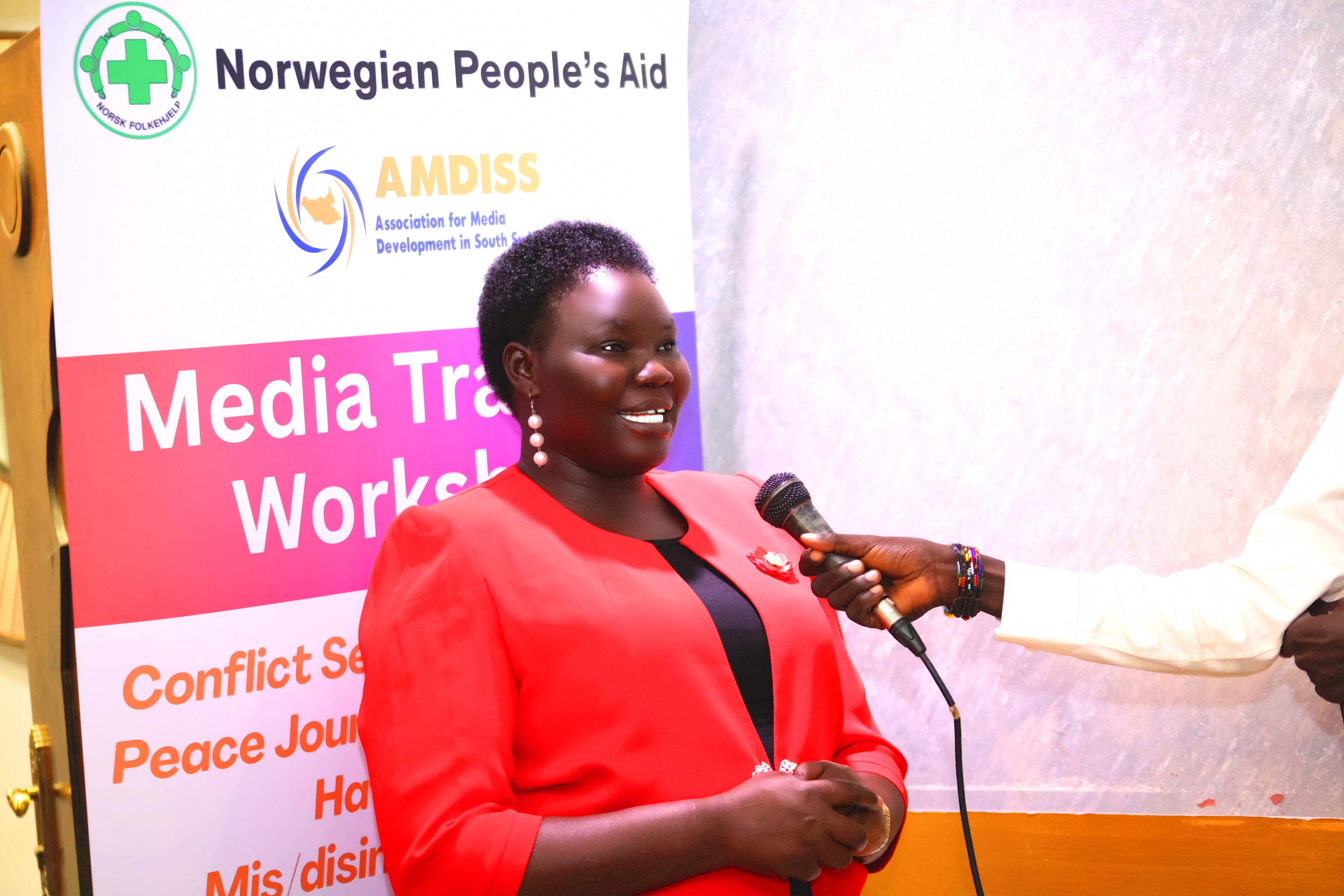
Ayaa Irene, Director of AMDISS Speaking to SSBC during training of Journalists in Juba

In November 2023, she transitioned to become the Director of Association for Media Development in South Sudan (AMDISS).

Lokang is the Co-founder and also served as the first Chairperson of the Female Journalists Network (FJN), a female network of media practitioners that advocates the rights of female journalists.

Irene is also the chair of the Board of Directors for Sama FM 99.3, community Radio station based in Juba which provides educative and peace programmes. She is also a Gender Media Trainer at Journalists for Human Rights.

Ayaa is currently an executive board member of IFEX and AFEX, regional media advocating bodies that advocate for Free Press and Freedom of Expression.

She also been involved in short-term consultancies with organizations like the World Bank initiative and Journalists for Human Rights.

Ayaa Irene, the Director of AMDISS is an Advocate of Media Freedom, Freedom of Expression and Protection of Journalists in South Sudan

Lokang has also been as Activist on Gender Equality where trains and mentor female journalists on issues of Gender Sensitive Reporting.
