= Deng Bol Aruai =

South Sudanese veteran

Dr. Deng Bol Aruai Bol
- Born: Sudan
- Occupation: Political leader
- Organization: Red Army Foundation
- Title: Chairperson at Common People's Alliance; Former Chairperson at Red Army Foundation
- Political party: Common People's Alliance party

Deng Bol Aruai Bol, is a South Sudanese veteran and a political leader. He has been the founder and chairperson of the Common People's Alliance party since 2023. Prior to this position, he chaired the Red Army Foundation, a Juba-based veterans' group for former Sudan People's Liberation Army child soldiers from its founding in 2012 until 2022. Aruai has announced his intention to contest the presidency in the first South Sudanese general election scheduled in December 2026. Aruai is a disabled veteran who uses a wheelchair and is known for advocating for veterans' and disability rights and for his outspoken stances on national issues, from calls to expel the UNMISS chief in 2016 to a proposal to secede the Upper Nile region in 2025.

== Biography ==
Aruai is referred to as a "veteran child soldier" and South Sudanese "Red Army," a term for the child soldiers of the Sudan People's Liberation Movement war. He was active in the Sudan People's Liberation Army (SPLA) during the Sudanese civil war. He was part of the generation of "Red Army" ex-combatant boys conscripted by the Sudan People's Liberation Army who, in the 2010s, began organizing for veterans' benefits.

In 2012, ex-Red Army veterans established the Red Army Foundation as an organization to advocate for former child soldiers. Deng Bol Aruai was a founding leader. Under his leadership, the Red Army Foundation grew its membership and engaged with the ruling Sudan People's Liberation Movement ( SPLM) party. In August 2021, Aruai authored an analysis in PaanLuel Wël on the RAF's historical relationship with the SPLM. In October 2022, he resigned from the foundation after ten years of his leadership at the foundation since 2012.

In September 2022, a new party called the National Democratic Alliance (NDA) was launched, and by October, it was renamed the Common People's Alliance (CPA) with Aruai as its leader. At the CPA's inaugural meeting in June 2023, he was explicitly identified as the party's chairperson.

By late 2023, Aruai had announced his intention to contest the presidency. Eye Radio reported that in September 2023, he said he was preparing to run in South Sudan's first general election, which was then scheduled for 2024 but was later postponed to December 2026 following an extension of the country's transitional period. He has framed his campaign as representing internally displaced and diaspora South Sudanese.
