= List of mobile network operators in South Sudan =

This is a list of mobile network operators in South Sudan:

1. MTN South Sudan
2. Zain South Sudan
3. Digitel South Sudan

== Market share ==
As of 31 December 2020, the market share among South Sudan's mobile telephone operators was as depicted in the table below. At that time South Sudan's population was estimated at approximately 11 million people.

Market Share Among Mobile Network Operators In South Sudan
Rank	Name of Operator	Millions of Customers	Market Share (%)
1	MTN South Sudan	1,700,000	61.8
2	Zain South Sudan	1,050,000	38.2
3	Digitel Telecommunications	Not active at that time	Not active then
	Total	2,750,000	100.00

Note:Totals may be slightly off due to rounding.

== See also ==
- Telecommunications in South Sudan
