= SSBC =

SSBC may refer to: SSBC Brand Naming Agency, Stuttgart (Germany)

- Sidney Sussex College Boat Club
- South Sudan Broadcasting Corporation

== Television ==
- The Big Chase: Tokyo SSBC Files, Japanese series starring Masaki Aiba
