= 2023 FIBA Basketball World Cup broadcasting rights =

Basketball broadcasting rights

The 2023 FIBA Basketball World Cup is a basketball tournament scheduled to take place from 25 August to 10 September 2023 involving 32 men's national teams from nations affiliated to the International Basketball Federation (FIBA). The tournament will be broadcast all over the world.

According to FIBA, broadcasters from 190 countries and territories have secured rights to the tournament.

== Broadcasters ==
Territory	Rights holder(s)	Ref
Andorra	RTVE	
Australia	ESPN	
Baltic states	TV3 Group	
Belgium	VOO Sport	
Bosnia and Herzegovina	Sport Klub	
Brazil	ESPN	
Bulgaria	Diema Sport	
Canada	Sportsnet	
Cape Verde	RTC	
China	CCTV; Tencent; Migu	
Croatia	Sport Klub	
Cyprus	Novasports	
Czech Republic	ČT; Saran Media	
Dominican Republic	CDN Deportes	
Finland	Nelonen Media	
France	France Télévisions; beIN Sports	
Georgia	GPB	
Germany	Deutsche Telekom	
Greece	ERT; Novasports	
Hungary	MTVA	
Iceland	RÚV	
India	FanCode	
Indonesia	MNC Media	
Italy	DAZN; RAI	
Ivory Coast	RTI	
Japan	TV Asahi; Nippon TV; DAZN	
Jordan	JRTV	
Latin America	Torneos	
Lebanon	LBCI	
Luxembourg	VOO Sport	
Malaysia	Astro SuperSport	
MENA	beIN Sports	
Mongolia	Central TV; Premier Sports	
Montenegro	Sport Klub; TV Vijesti	
Netherlands	Ziggo Sport	
New Zealand	TVNZ	
North Macedonia	Sport Klub	
Pacific Islands	Digicel	
Papua New Guinea	Digicel	
Philippines	Cignal; Smart; Pilipinas Live; TV5; One PH; One Sports; One Sports+; PTV; IBC-13	
Poland	TVP	
Portugal	RTP	
Puerto Rico	WAPA-TV	
Russia	Match TV	
San Marino	DAZN; RAI	
Serbia	Sport Klub; RTS	
Slovakia	RTVS	
Slovenia	Sport Klub; Šport TV	
South Korea	Coupang Play	
South Sudan	MTN	
Spain	RTVE	
Sub-Saharan Africa	StarTimes Sports	
Sweden	SVT	
Switzerland	SRG SSR	
Taiwan	ELTA	
Tajikistan	TV Varzish	
Turkey	S Sport; NTV	
Ukraine	XSPORT	
United States	ESPN	

== Radio ==
Territory	Rights holder(s)	Ref
Angola	RDP África	
Cape Verde	RDP África	
Guinea-Bissau	RDP África	
Mozambique	RDP África	
Portugal	RDP África	
São Tomé and Príncipe	RDP África	
