= Zain Sudan =

Sudanese telecommunications company

- Formerly: Mobitel (1996-2007)

Zain Sudan (formerly Mobitel) is a mobile phone operator in Sudan, and part of the Zain Group. Formed in 1996, a large portion of the network split in 2011 to Zain South Sudan.

== Zain Sudan: Launch & Establishment ==
Zain Sudan (formerly Mobitel) started towards the end of 1996, as the first mobile phone operator in Sudan. Launched its commercial activities in February 1997, starting with Greater Khartoum with a GSM network, turning Sudan into the fourth country to launch mobile services in North Africa. It was established as a joint-stock company with the shares divided between Sudan Telecommunications Company Ltd. (Sudatel) and several other shareholders including Celtel, until 2006 when it was fully acquired by the Mobile Telecommunications Company (MTC) as part of its strategy; to transform from a local to a regional, then a global telecom entity. Following the acquisition, Zain consolidated its position in the Middle East and Africa, becoming the leading mobile telephone operator in Sudan.

On September 9, 2007, Mobitel rebranded to Zain together with the other companies in the Group in Kuwait, Bahrain and Jordan. Zain then became the brand name of the group's companies in Africa and the Middle East, operating in Kuwait, Bahrain, Saudi Arabia, Iraq, Jordan, Lebanon (MTC Touch), and Sudan.

As of January 2014, Zain Sudan have over 11 million active subscribers and coverage reach to more than 90% of Sudan's population.

Zain provides 2G, 3G and 4G mobile phone services under the license granted to it by the National Telecommunications Corporation (NTC) in accordance with telecommunications act 2001.

Zain also pursues a policy of recruitment for Sudanese employees and workers in all its functions, in addition to providing opportunities for individuals with disabilities.

=== Network launch & growth ===
In 1996 15 Zain installed the first 10 Base Transceiver Stations (BTS), covering “Dar Elhatif”, Burry, Bahri, Shambat, Omdurman, Almahdia, Khartoum South's new extension, the General Command and Abo Haraz.

By the end of 1997, Wad Madani and Port Sudan, in addition to other cities and states, joined the Sudanese Mobile Telephone Network, through optical fiber cables. The years 1998-1999 it covered numerous cities; towns and villages in almost every state in the Country.

Over the years, the growing number of Zain stations increased coverage nationally in addition to updating the network technologies. The data communication services were then introduced which required updating and replacing the devices and equipment used.

The capacity of the main network then exceeded 11 million subscribers.

=== South Sudan's Network Separation ===
It is often and for different reasons that telecom networks merge. But it was the first time in the history of the telecom industry worldwide for a network to split its operations. As a result of South Sudan's succession, Zain had to face the challenge of separating its network into two independent networks.

Efforts to separate South Sudan's network and arrangements for a new network infrastructure began in 2010, where an urgent need to prepare the Data and Switch ~~and~~ Centers appeared. The centers were complete and ready by 2011.

A proposal for the network separation which covered 90% of the populated areas was prepared since January 2011. The objective was to build an independent network from Sudan's with the most advanced Billing and VAS systems. This was completed before September 1 which was the date marked for the separation. The network separation was completed immediately after the independence of South Sudan.

South Sudanese engineers in addition to other staff had been trained to manage the Zain South Sudan network which was the first independent network in comparison to others. Due to the early planning, the network was established with the world's most advanced 3G technology and covered South Sudan's largest cities including Juba, Wau and Malakal. The network was also extended to other populated cities and SIM Cards were changed to bear the new name, Zain- South Sudan.

Zain was the first company to use the new numbers after migration to the new country code together with the new Zain- South Sudan SIM Cards in the newly born nation. A technical plan was also prepared to ensure the continuity of the service even when using the new numbers.

In addition, roaming subscribers in South Sudan were able to use the Zain- South Sudan network at a time when other networks were facing difficulties in accommodating roaming subscribers.
