= Ebony TV =

TV channel

Ebony TV is a satellite television of South Sudan. It transmits via the Atlantic Bird 2 satellite in Arabic.

== See also ==
- Southern Sudan TV
- Media of South Sudan
- Television in South Sudan
