= Tor Madira Machier =

South Sudanese journalist (born 1990)

- Born: John Tor Madira Machier; December 13, 1990 (age 35); Bentiu, Rubkona, Unity State, South Sudan
- Education: Faculty of Mass Communication Cairo University
- Occupation: Journalist
- Years active: 2015–present
- Known for: Editor-in-chief at Sudans Post

John Tor Madira Machier (born December 13, 1990) is a South Sudanese journalist who serves as the editor-in-chief of Sudans Post, a digital-only bilingual publication that covers Sudan and South Sudan in English and Arabic. Tor is the founder of the publication, one of few independent media organizations in South Sudan. Before the founding of Sudans Post, Tor worked for several media houses in both Sudan and South Sudan. He also contributes to Sudan War Monitor, a collaborative of journalists and open source researchers tracking the events of Sudan’s ongoing conflict.

== Early life ==
Tor was born in Bentiu, the capital of South Sudan's Unity State. He lived his childhood there and worked as a teacher for the state ministry of education. He later on worked with the Bentiu Radio FM-99 as a freelance reporter until December 2013 when the South Sudanese Civil War broke out and fled to Egypt. Tor holds a bachelor's degree in Journalism from Cairo University's Faculty of Mass Communication.

== Career and threats by security agents ==
Machier begun working as a freelance journalist around November 2013 at Bentiu Radio. He became a popular columnist and opinion writer in 2014 following the outbreak of civil war writing extensively against the atrocities of the government of President Salva Kiir. He was hired to work for local news outlet Nyamilepedia as editor-in-chief in April 2018, but resigned due to lack of editorial impartiality from Nyamilepedia's higher management.

In 2020, he became the editor in chief of Sudans Post and following the blocking of the news publication in Juba, security agents searched for him and phoned him in Cairo to show up for a meeting in an apparent set up to arrest and deport him back to South Sudan. He fled to hiding and was never arrested.

== Controversy ==
Madira triggered backlash from among the Sudanese public and army after deciding to adopt pro-Egyptian views when he claimed in July 2017 that the disputed regions of Halaib and Shalateen are Egyptian territories and that Egypt is not a national security threat. There were reports that he was later on approached by security operatives of the Sudanese intelligence in Cairo.
