= Sawa Shabab =

- Genre: Radio drama
- Running time: 30 minutes
- Country of origin: South Sudan
- Languages: Arabic, English, and local languages
- Home station: Various community radio stations
- Created by: PeaceTech Lab
- Written by: Various
- Original release: 2014 – Present
- No. of series: 5+
- No. of episodes: 150+
- Audio format: Radio
- Website: Sawa Shabab on SoundCloud

Sawa Shabab (Youth Together) is a peace building radio drama aired in over thirty local radio stations within the Country of South Sudan.

== Background and objectives ==
Sawa Shabab is a peacebuilding radio drama series grounded in an educational curriculum developed with local partners. The program aims to foster meaningful change among South Sudanese youth by promoting peaceful co-existence and national identity, empowering young people with a sense of personal responsibility and participatory citizenship, and encouraging understanding of gender equality as a pillar of peaceful societal development.

The storyline follows four young protagonists Rose, Winnie, Taban, and Richard who navigate challenges such as tribalism, forced marriage, poverty, insecurity, and tensions between tradition and modern aspirations. Through their journeys, they gradually evolve into peacebuilders within their communities.

Listeners are encouraged to engage actively with the program through SMS, voice calls, and social media platforms such as Facebook and Twitter. This interactive approach fosters reflection and allows youth to express their opinions rather than passively receiving messages. A study reported that among active female listeners, the perception of being "equal citizens in society" rose from 40% before listening to 62% after listening during Season 2.

== Partners ==
The drama series of the Sawa Shabab (Youth Together) is being run and supported by the United States Institute for Peace as well as the Peace Techlab for the production and online airing in Radio stations including the grand and famous Radio Miraya.

According to UNICEF, radio programs like this has helped improve the gap of girl child related problems such as early child marriage among others. This is an indicator that the radio drama not only have a local importance but a worldwide effect to the different continents and people.
