= Zain South Sudan =

Telecommunications company in South Sudan

- Company type: Subsidiary of Zain Group
- Industry: Telecommunications
- Predecessor: Zain Sudan
- Founded: July 9, 2011; 14 years ago
- Headquarters: Mundri Road, Haya Jabal, Gudele, Juba, South Sudan
- Area served: South Sudan
- Products: Mobile Telephony; Broadband; Internet services
- Parent: Zain Group

Zain South Sudan is a mobile communications and information technology services provider in South Sudan. Zain South Sudan is a subsidiary of the Zain Group, a telecommunications multinational, active in eight middle eastern and north African countries, serving an estimated 48.3 million customers, as of 30 June 2021.

Zain South Sudan is the second-largest telecommunications network company in the country, with an estimated 1,050,000 customers as of 31 December 2020, behind market leader and sole competitor at that time, MTN South Sudan. Zain South Sudan's market share was 38.2 percent, as of December 2020.

== Location ==
The headquarters of Zain South Sudan are located along Mundri Road, Haya Jabal, Gudele, in the city of Juba, the capital of South Sudan. The coordinates of the headquarters are 4°52'07.0"N, 31°32'24.0"E (Latitude:4.868611; Longitude:31.540000).

== Overview ==
With customer base of about 1.05 million, as of 31 December 2020, Zain South Sudan commanded a market share of 38.2 percent against its only competitor at that time, MTN South Sudan, with 1.7 million subscribers and a 61.8 percent market share. At that time, the population of South Sudan was estimated at 11 million people.

== History ==
As part of the 2005 Naivasha Agreement between the Khartoum central government and the Sudan People's Liberation Army/Movement (SPLA/M), a referendum should take place after five years in the Southern Sudan region, to determine whether the region should remain as part of Sudan or become independent. On 7 February 2011, the referendum results show the majority voting in favour of independence.

As a result, of the referendum, which shows Southern Sudan's succession from Sudan, Zain Sudan has to split its operation into two separate independent networks. It was the first time in the history of the telecom industry worldwide for a network to split its operations.

== See also ==
- List of mobile network operators in South Sudan
