= Access Radio =

Radio station in South Sudan

Yei, Central Equatoria; South Sudan
- Frequency: 88.8 FM

Programming
- Languages: Local languages, English
- Format: Community radio

Ownership
- Owner: Community based

History
- First air date: 2021

Technical information
- Licensing authority: South Sudan Media Authority, National Communication Authority
- Transmitter coordinates: 4.101991°N 30.665699°E

Links
- Website: https://radioyei.org

Access Radio is a community radio station based in Yei, Central Equatoria, South Sudan. It was officially launched in 2021 and broadcasts under the slogan "transforming communities". The station is licensed by the National Communication Authority, the statutory body mandated to license and regulate electronic communication activities and services in South Sudan

== Overview ==
Access Radio broadcasts to Yei, Lainya, Morobo, Kajo-Keji and parts of Juba County in Central Equatoria State. The station describes itself as an independent, community based initiative, producing programs "for the community, by the community, and about the community".

Its stated goals include promoting peacebuilding, good governance, reconciliation, unity and cultural diversity. According to station managers, the radio aims to improve access to timely and reliable information, as well as to empower citizens through education and dialogue.

In November 2025, Access Radio expanded its services by launching online broadcasting, allowing its programmes to be streamed live via its official website.

According to station management, the move was intended to extend the station’s reach to audiences in other parts of South Sudan and to South Sudanese communities living abroad.

== Community role ==
Community leaders and local organizations have expressed support for the station. Activists and youth leaders in Yei have emphasized its potential role in peacebuilding, reconciliation, youth participation and women's empowerment.

In September 2021, the National Press Club (South Sudan) (NPC-SS), with support from UNESCO, conducted a two-day training for Access Radio journalists. The training focused on gender-sensitive reporting, basic journalism skills, ethics and protection of journalists. The initiative aimed to improve media coverage of gender and women’s issues in South Sudan.

Access Radio has also been a platform for development and peacebuilding organizations. For example, the Whitaker Peace and Development Initiative (WPDI) partnered with the station for radio talk shows on peace and youth engagement.

== See also ==
- Media in South Sudan
