= The Citizen (South Sudan) =

Newspaper

- Fighting corruption and dictatorship
- Type: Daily newspaper
- Format: Tabloid
- Editor: Nhial Bol
- Founded: 2006
- Ceased publication: 2015
- Language: English
- Headquarters: Juba, South Sudan
- Country: South Sudan
- Website: www.citizen-news.net (defunct)

The Citizen was an English-language newspaper based in Juba, the national capital of South Sudan and the state capital of Central Equatoria.

The newspaper was first founded during the second period of autonomy for what was then known as Southern Sudan, the ten states in the deep south of the Republic of the Sudan, in 2006. It became South Sudan's largest newspaper when the country formally declared independence on 9 July 2011.

However, in September 2015 the Editor-in-Chief of The Citizen Nhial Bol announced he was resigning and shutting down the newspaper and TV station after government security agents shut down his newspaper's premises, while receiving death threats.

== Circulation ==
Due to poor infrastructure in South Sudan, virtually the entire regular readership of The Citizen is concentrated in Juba and its environs in the southern region of Equatoria. Newspapers can take several days to reach states like Northern Bahr el Ghazal that are located relatively far from the capital.

== Staff and coverage ==
The newspaper employee close to 50 people, but only about half of them are full-time employees. The Citizen relies on stringers to cover much of the country, with its full-time reporters concentrated in Juba and other major Equatorian cities and towns.

== Controversies ==
=== Encounters with law enforcement ===
The Citizen has had a history of run-ins with security officials in South Sudan, which editor Nhial Bol attributes to the lack of familiarity South Sudanese police and soldiers have with constituting forces answerable to a legitimate government espousing democratic ideals, with many being veterans of the Second Sudanese Civil War in which they fought as an irregular force predicated on frontier justice. Though the South Sudanese government has positioned itself as a champion of freedom of the press, Bol and his reporters have faced arrest on several occasions and in February 2011, the newspaper's offices were reportedly ransacked by plainclothes security officers. Bol has also alleged distributors of The Citizen in Juba have faced harassment by police.

=== Allegations of bias ===
The independent South Sudan News Agency published a withering critique of an article The Citizen ran under an anonymous byline alleging ties between an independent parliamentary candidate in Western Equatoria and the paramilitary group the Lord's Resistance Army in April 2010. SSNA called the article's author "an anonymous coward" and decried the report as "the cheapest of all propagandas".
