= Sudans Post =

South Sudanese newspaper

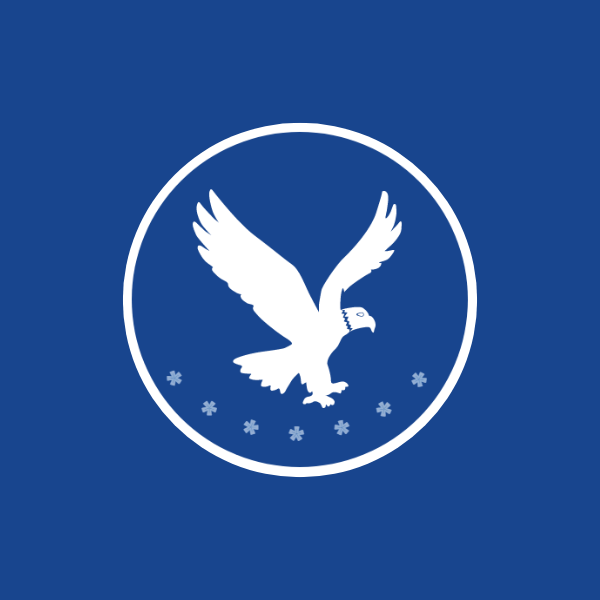
- Format: Online newspaper
- Editor-in-chief: Tor Madira Machier
- Founded: 2017; 5 years ago
- Political alignment: Independent
- Language: English and Arabic
- Headquarters: Juba, South Sudan
- Website: sudanspost.com

Sudans Post (Arabic ســـودانس بـوست) is an independent South Sudanese online newspaper published primarily in English and which covers Sudan and South Sudanese topics. It was founded in 2017, but was not launched until December 2019. In February 2021, it claimed that it was the second-most visited South Sudanese news website in the country with more than 500,000 monthly page viewers, and that it had been visited – as of June 2021 – over 3 million times.

The website brings attention to political, social and cultural issues in Sudan and South Sudan.

== Location ==
Sudans Post is currently being operated from abroad. It was headquartered in Juba's Tongpiny neighborhood prior to June 2020, when government security agencies blocked access to its website and closed its office. Its founding editor-in-chief is Tor Madira Machier.

== Overview ==
Sudans Post was established in 2017 by South Sudanese journalist Tor Madira Machier and his brother Keah Madira Machier, a comedian popularly known as Penton Keah. The website was not launched until December 2019. It asserts that its private ownership guarantees its journalistic and editorial independence.

Sudans Post also says its primary aim is to contribute to social discussions by "providing readers with an alternate depiction of events that occur on Sudan, South Sudan and East Africa, and to establish an engaging social platform for readers to discover and discuss the various issues that impact the two countries and the region."

== 2020 government blocking ==
In June, 2020, the Sudans Post news website was blocked by the South Sudanese government following the publication of an article deemed defamatory by the government of South Sudan and the National Security Service (NSS).

It had earlier published an article alleging that a Juba-based wealthy businesswoman and philanthropist was being investigated by the National Security Service (NSS) over suspicions that she was involved in a plan to kill her own husband. Two months later, Qurium Media Foundation, a Swedish non-profit organization, announced that it had deployed a mirror for the website to circumvent the government blocking.
