= A*STAR Talent Search =

The A*STAR Talent Search (ATS) is a research-based science competition in Singapore for high school students between 15–21 years of age. It was formerly known as National Science Talent Search. The ATS is an annual competition which acknowledges and rewards students who have a strong aptitude for science & technology. This competition provides students the opportunity to showcase their stellar projects and encourage them to further explore science and technology.

The ATS is administered by the Agency for Science, Technology and Research (A*STAR) and Science Centre Singapore (SCS) from 2006. Participants are required to compete in the Singapore Science and Engineering Fair (SSEF) and winners from the fair will then proceed to the short-listing round of ATS. The panel of judges consists of distinguished scientists from local and international universities, as well as A*STAR research institutes and a Nobel Laureate as the Chief Judge. ATS winners need to display resourcefulness, mastery of scientific concepts, as well as passion for scientific research.

The First Prize winner will be given S$5000, inclusive of a sponsored overseas conference.

Winners and finalists (top 8 students) of the ATS have gone on to top universities worldwide, such as National University of Singapore, Harvard University, Princeton University, Yale University, Stanford University, Massachusetts Institute of Technology and California Institute of Technology in the United States, and University of Cambridge, University of Oxford and Imperial College London in the United Kingdom.

List of A*STAR Talent Search First Prize Winners
| Year | Name | Institution | Chief Judge |
|---|---|---|---|
| 2020 | Qiu Xinzhi | NUS High School of Mathematics and Science | |
| 2019 | Tan Kin Hern | NUS High School of Mathematics and Science | |
| 2018 | Vijayakumar Ragavi | NUS High School of Mathematics and Science | |
| 2017 | Rachel Qing Pang | Raffles Girls Secondary School | |
| 2016 | Victoria Emily Hui Ting Buckland | National Junior College | |
| 2015 | Girish Kumar | NUS High School of Mathematics and Science | |
| 2014 | Way Tan | NUS High School of Mathematics and Science | Ada Yonath |
| 2013 | Zera Ong Hui Xuan | Raffles Institution | Hartmut Michel |
| 2012 | Lydia Liu Tingruo | Raffles Institution | Erwin Neher |
| 2011 | Cheng Herng Yi | NUS High School of Mathematics and Science | Rudolph Marcus |
| 2010 | Ramyiadarsini Indira Elangovan | Raffles Institution | Barry Marshall |
| 2009 | Chen Fang Yew Nicholas | NUS High School of Mathematics and Science | Tim Hunt |
| 2008 | Chua Meng Shuen | Dunman High School | Peter Agre |
| 2007 | Hang Hao Chuien | Hwa Chong Institution | Sydney Brenner |
| 2006 | Zhao Yan | Raffles Institution | Barry Marshall |
