= National Communication Authority (South Sudan) =

South Sudan Government Organization

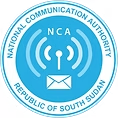

Agency overview
- Formed: June 2015
- Jurisdiction: Government of South Sudan
- Headquarters: Juba, South Sudan
- Agency executive: Gieth Kon Mathiang, Director General
- Parent department: Ministry of Information, Communication Technology and Postal Services
- Website: www.nca.gov.ss

The National Communication Authority is the national regulatory body responsible for managing the telecommunications, broadcasting, information and communications technology (ICT), and postal services sectors in the Republic of South Sudan. It operates under the mandate of the National Communication Act, 2012 and was officially launched in June 2015.

== See also ==
- Telecommunications in South Sudan
- Ministry of Information, Communication Technology and Postal Services (South Sudan)
