= Talent Search South Sudan 2012 =

Television music competition in South Sudan

Talent Search South Sudan 2012 (TSSS2012) was a television music competition in South Sudan, broadcast on Southern Sudan Television in 2012. The show was produced by the South Sudan Artists Association and Talent 5, and sponsored by Vivacell Mobile. The format was similar to shows like The X Factor. Voting was done through SMS.

The auditions were held at the Nyakuron Cultural Centre in March 2012. Out of 92 artists, 23 were selected (19 men, 4 women). The show was supposed to be launched at a live event in Juba in April, with the Tanzanian rapper AY. The live event was, however, stopped at the last minute by security forces, due to fears of attacks in the backdrop of the eruption of border clashes between Sudan and South Sudan.

The TSSS 2012 edition was won by the rapper Thomas Tombe, competing under the name Thomas Taban. The first prize was £15,000 SSP and the runner-up won £8,000 SSP.
