= SSBC TV =

South Sudan Broadcasting Corporation Television (SSBC TV)
- Type: Broadcast television network
- Country: South Sudan
- Availability: National
- Motto: Truly African
- Headquarters: Juba, South Sudan
- Broadcast area: South Sudan
- Owner: South Sudan Broadcasting Corporation (Government of South Sudan)
- Launch date: 2005
- Former names: South Sudan Television (SSTV) (2005-2016)
- Picture format: 576i (SDTV); 1080i (HDTV)
- Language: English, Juba Arabic

South Sudan Broadcasting Corporation Television (SSBC TV)
- Country: South Sudan
- Headquarters: Juba, South Sudan

Programming
- Picture format: 576i (SDTV)

Ownership
- Owner: South Sudan Broadcasting Corporation

History
- Launched: 2005

SSBC TV (South Sudan Broadcasting Corporation Television) is a public television network in South Sudan which is owned and operated by the South Sudan Broadcasting Corporation. SSBC TV broadcasts in English and Juba Arabic and can also be viewed on Satellite. The network runs a few small local TV stations in Aweil, Wau, Malakal and Rumbek. South Africa, China and Japan provided equipment and training for SSBC TV staff.

SSBC TV transmits via the Arabsat Badr-4 and Arabsat-5C satellite. SSBC TV broadcast hours are:

- 9:00 – 0:00 (Juba Time)
- 7:00 – 22:00 (UTC)

== History ==
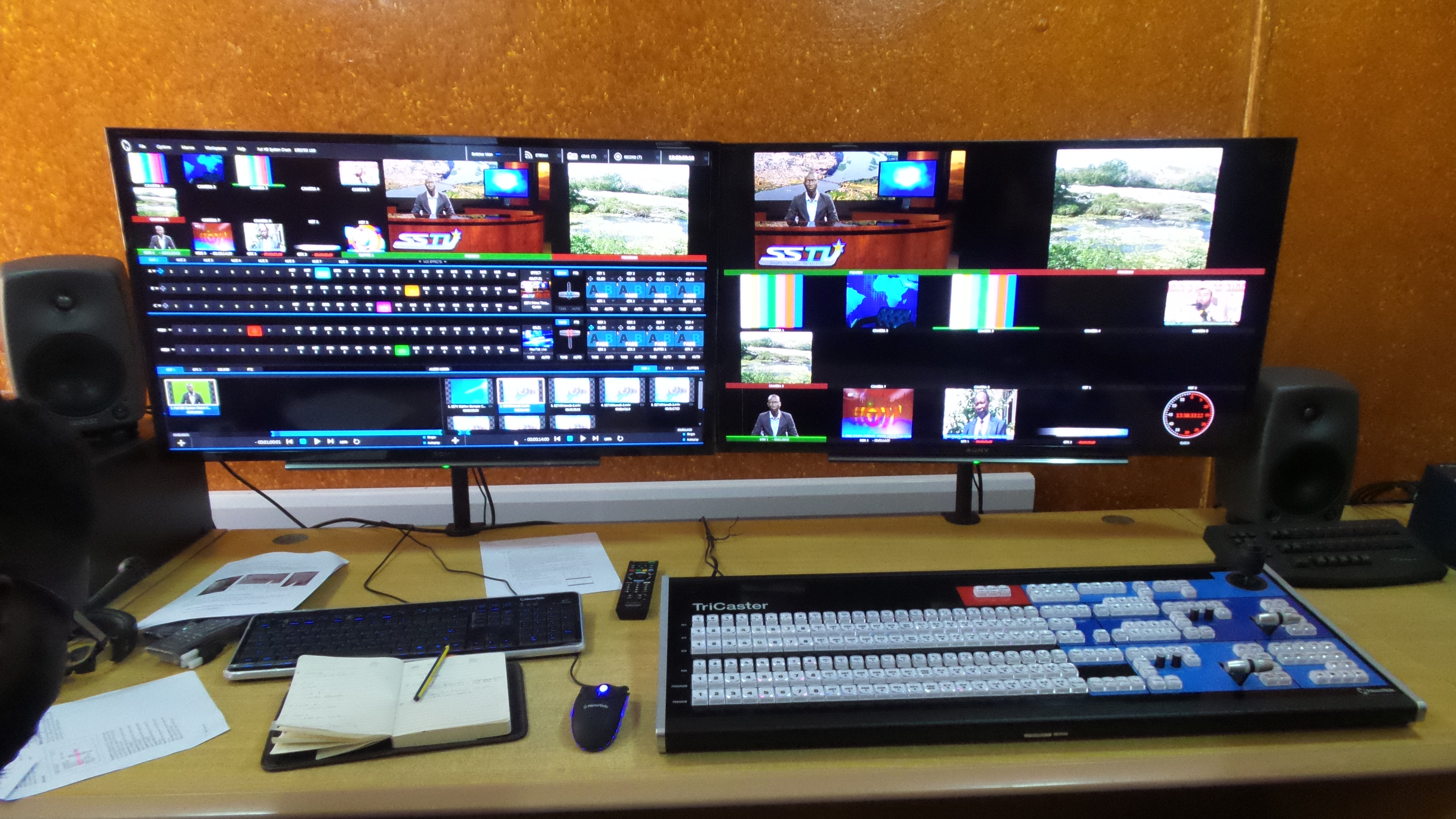
Inside the production rooms

The channel began under the direction of self-government of South Sudan, made following a peace agreement in 2005. Initially, it was available only in Juba and operated under the name Southern Sudan Television (South Sudan Television after independence). On November 17, 2007, SSTV enlisted South African production company Urban Brew, with which it provided assistance to increase its coverage to a national scale, using satellite technology. In October 2008, thanks to an agreement with the Egyptian government, it was announced that SSTV would be carried on the Nilesat satellite, while several South Sudanese would be trained in Cairo.

After several months of its first broadcast, it faced with a big problem: paying for transmission fees via Arabsat Badr 6 and Arab communications satellites, because of the independence of this country. Each country must pay rent for Arabsat to broadcast all its channels. However, the newly created Southern Sudan has not done since the beginning of the year, the channel is broadcast through the rent of his republic mother. The channel was likely going to interrupt its programs from the satellite. There was also the aim of creating an independent corporation with an independent budget, in order to improve its status.

In 2012 Talent Search South Sudan 2012 premiered. A second season followed in September 2013.

On November 5, 2014, SSTV director Khamis Abdelatif was sacked from his post after only four weeks, accused for controlling the channel in his favor. The minister of information denied these allegations.

At 1pm on June 6, 2016, the newly-renamed SSBC TV suspended its operations because of claimed damage to broadcast equipment. SSBC requested US$200,000 worth of new equipment from the government, but nothing was provided

== See also ==
- Ebony TV
- Media of South Sudan
- Television in South Sudan
