= Equator Broadcasting Corporation =

- Type: State-owned enterprise
- Branding: EBC
- Country: South Sudan
- Availability: South Sudan
- Founded: July 6, 2015
- Owner: Government of Central Equator State

The Equator Broadcasting Corporation also known by its acronym EBC is the public-service broadcaster of Central Equatoria State. The organization is headquartered at Juba, the capital of Central Equatoria State in South Sudan and transmits on a frequency of 89.4FM and EBC TV. It was established by a gubernatorial degree in 2012 to perform the works of radio and television broadcast. With the existence of the media laws, EBC became the first state public broadcaster in the Republic of South Sudan.

Oliver Modi, the former President of the Union of Journalists of South Sudan is Managing Director of Equator Broadcasting Corporation (EBC). He was first appointed as Acting Managing Director in a Gubernatorial Decree No.01/2022 issued on January 4, 2022, by Central Equatoria State Governor Emmanuel Adil Anthony.

The corporation has an active board that is usually appointed by the Central Equatoria State governor.

== Subsidiaries ==
Equator Radio 89.4 FM and EBC TV are the two channels that EBC has right now. The second one, which is free-to-air or terrestrial, can be found on UHF Channel 21. EBC helps people get into and take part in public life. They help people learn more, see more, and learn more about themselves by helping them learn more about the world and the people around them. A digitalization process for the TV station was announced in 2022.

== Coverage and programming ==
Equator Radio 89.4 FM and Equator Television Channel 21; are public broadcast channels making EBC a meeting place where all South Sudanese citizens and other stakeholders in their plurality and diversity are equally or fairly considered. Its radio and television stations are tools for information, communication and edutainment. Because of this, its programs and coverage is very accessible.

While its mandate is not restricted to information and socio-cultural development, its programming and coverage is designed to appeal to its audience making it do its work with concern for quality that distinguishes it from other commercial and public broadcasters.

EBC is neither entirely subject to the dictates of commercial profitability nor state-controlled. As such, its journalists; reporters, editors, news anchors, programs designers and presenters all strive to be exclusively daring, innovative and creative in even developing Radio and TV programmes from village to the national government taking this bold opportunity as its unique way of setting outstanding standards for journalists in electronic and print media houses. The news coverage, feature stories, analytical talk shows, edutainment programmes, drama and documentaries all aim at bringing the desired change to cover issues as they break: political, economic and business, current affairs, governance, and nation-building, sports, weather and spiritual.

== History ==
Clement Wani Konga, former Governor of Central Equatoria State, announced the launch of the new Equator Broadcasting Corporation in Juba on July 6, 2015. Jacob Aligo Lo Ladu would serve as the Managing Director, Basil Buga Nyama as Director TV Unit and Capacity Development, while Colins Lasu as Director for Radio Unit, with EBC being used as a public service broadcaster through its two media channels, Equator Radio 89.4 FM and EBC TV.

== Press freedom ==
South Sudan's media landscape is still heavily censored. In the country, journalists are often threatened, scared, kidnapped, and arrested. Censorship from the government often makes it hard for journalists to report. At least five journalists from Equator Broadcasting Corporation, Radio Miraya, Juba Monitor, Al-Mougif newspaper, and the South Sudan Broadcasting Corporation were detained for six hours on October 27, 2020, and then released the same day, according to an article published in Juba Monitor on October 28, which CPJ read, a report published by Eye Radio on October 30, and a person who spoke to CPJ on the condition of anonymity for fear of retaliation. According to the same media reports, the journalists were arrested while trying to cover a press conference held by the Central Equatoria State's Chamber of Commerce.
