= South Sudan Broadcasting Corporation =

Public broadcasting company in South Sudan

- South Sudan Broadcasting Corporation logo from 2005
- Type: Statutory corporation
- Industry: Mass media
- Genre: News and current Affairs
- Founded: 18 December 2010
- Headquarters: Juba, South Sudan
- Area served: South Sudan
- Key people: Moyiga Nduru (Director of TV sector); Suzan Alphonse (Director of Radio Sector); James Nyak Riek (Director for Programs); Mustafa Samson (Director for Operations); Pitia Loku (Director for Administration and Finance); Francis Duku Abe (Head of News and Current Affairs Department); Rejoice Tio Samson (Head of English News & Chief Editor); Mohammad Desaram (Head of Arabic News & Chief Editor); Garang John Deng (Assignment Editor)
- Products: Television & Radio broadcasting
- Production output: News, Public Affairs, Light Entertainment, Sport, Religion & Education
- Services: SSBC TV; South Sudan Radio
- Owner: South Sudan Government (Ministry of Information, Communication Technology and Postal Services)
- Number of employees: 500+

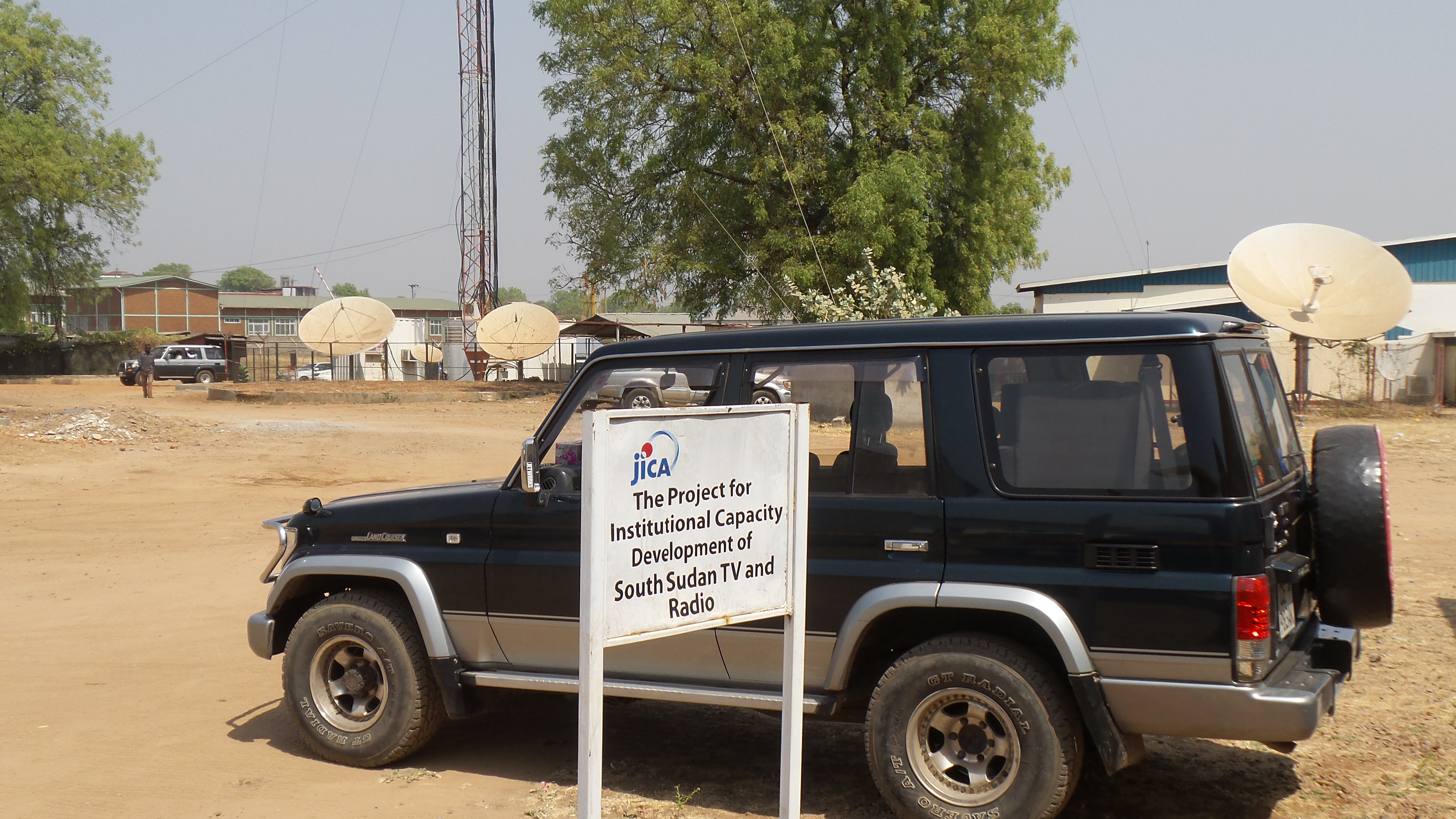
SSBC site in Juba, 2016

The South Sudan Broadcasting Corporation (SSBC) is a national public service broadcaster in South Sudan. SSBC provides radio stations (AM/FM) as well as television broadcasts through its VHF/UHF analogue transmitters in Juba. It broadcasts its radio and television services via satellite and can be viewed from many places in the world through the Badr 4, Intelsat 19 and Galaxy 19 satellites.

SSBC's headquarters are in central Juba, where it has its studios, television/FM transmitters, satellite uplink and mast. It also leases facilities to international broadcasters such as the BBC World Service and Radio France.

In 2012 the Government of South Sudan and Japan International Corporation Agency signed a six years $6 Million deal to boost the development of the government media house. In 2018, China announced plans to spend $15Mil USD on developing a new state-of-art studio and also training employees.

== Owned and operated station ==
- South Sudan Broadcasting Corporation Television
- South Sudan Radio

== See also ==
- Media of South Sudan
