= South Sudan News Agency =

Online newspaper

SSNA logo

South Sudan News Agency (SSNA) is an independent English-language online newspaper covering news about South Sudan and other African countries, headquartered in the United States. The SSNA was founded in 2008 and launched in 2010. The South Sudan News Agency features authors and scholars from South Sudan and other regions around the world. Its founding editor, Duop Chak Wuol, resigned effective September 30, 2024, citing "other commitments" that needed his attention.

The South Sudan News Agency is an independent news organization.

== See also ==
- Media of South Sudan
