= The Juba Post =

Newspaper

- Type: Regional newspaper
- Format: Tabloid
- Owner: Juba Media Company
- Publisher: Charles Rehan Surur
- Editor-in-chief: Michael Koma
- Founded: Hildebrand B. Bijleveld
- Language: English
- Headquarters: Juba
- Circulation: 2,500 (as of Dec. 2011)

The Juba Post (also: The Juba Post Newspaper) is an independent English-language newspaper in South Sudan. It currently has offices in both Juba and Khartoum. It is the first independent newspaper of South Sudan based in Juba, the capital of the Republic of South Sudan. The newspaper is owned by the Juba Media Company. The chairman of the board of directors is Charles Rehan Surur. In 2011 the newspaper had a circulation of 2500 biweekly issues. It is financially supported by advertising and subscription.

The newspaper was established in 2004 by a group of displaced Southern Sudanese and students from Juba University in Khartoum, who were brought together by Hildebrand Bijleveld. It appeared initially in Khartoum as an unlicensed bi-lingual (Arabic/English) weekly before the Comprehensive Peace Agreement was signed between the Khartoum government and the Sudan People's Liberation Army on 9 July 2005, leading to the Independence of South Sudan on 9 July 2011.

The National Press Council in Khartoum issued in October 2004 an official letter to all the printing and publishing companies in Sudan not to print the newspaper. Despite this warning, the paper continued to appear and was even openly sold at newsstands in Khartoum. The paper was issued a license by the National Press Council on 23 March 2005, but almost immediately ran into difficulty. Following reports by the newspaper on the expulsion of internally displaced persons from a camp in Khartoum and closing of the daily newspaper The Khartoum Monitor, The Juba Post was shut down by the government and three of its reporters were jailed on the charge of being "illegal journalists." The Juba Post returned to operations shortly thereafter.

The Juba Post was for several years the only newspaper based in Juba, the capital of South Sudan. Over the years, a number of its editors and managers have been arrested by authorities after publishing articles concerning ethnic tension, lack of rule of law and corruption.

The newspaper's most current online issue is dated 12 March 2012.
