= South Sudan Radio =

Government owned radio station in South Sudan

- Type: Radio network
- Country: South Sudan
- Availability: National
- Headquarters: Juba, South Sudan
- Broadcast area: South Sudan
- Owner: South Sudan Broadcasting Corporation (Government of South Sudan)
- Launch date: 2010
- Language: English, Juba Arabic

South Sudan Radio is a South Sudanese radio station owned by the Government of South Sudan. It operates AM radio stations in Juba, Wau, Bentiu and Malakal. It also operates FM stations in Juba, Wau, Bentiu, Malakal, Bor, Torit, Kwajok, Yambio and Rumbek.
