= Radio Bakhita =

Radio Bakhita 91.0 FM
Juba; South Sudan
- Frequency: 91.0 MHz

Programming
- Languages: English, Juba Arabic

History
- First air date: February 8, 2007

Technical information
- Transmitter coordinates: 4°51′N 31°36′E

Radio Bakhita 91.0 FM – the Voice of the Church – is a media house owned by the Roman Catholic Archdiocese of Juba, South Sudan. It was established in 2006 and officially opened in Juba on 8 February 2007, the day the Church there celebrates the country's first saint, Josephine Bakhita. It was established with the aim of "creating a platform to promote evangelization, communication for peace and good governance, as well as the general public's active participation in the life of the country."

It is the main station of the South Sudan Catholic Radio Network, covering an area of around 300 km^{2}, with a claimed potential audience of 1,000,000. The station transmits daily from 6:00 AM through to 9:00 PM in two languages, catering to speakers of both Juba Arabic and English.

== Programming ==
Radio Bakhita 91.0 broadcasts call-in discussion shows, community news, and short segments on health, education, peacebuilding, youth religious life, and women's rights. Particular broadcasts are designed for people traumatized by civil war. Radio Bakhita 91.0 also broadcasts programmes for specific skills, such as Terbia A and Terbia B, which consist of four series of 60 half-hour English language lessons that range from beginner to advanced levels.

== State censorship ==
Like other radio and print news sources in South Sudan, Radio Bakhita 91.0 has been periodically shut down by the country's security services for allowing live phone calls and open debates, and for broadcasting clips of opponents of the government of South Sudan. In August 2014, Security Services shut down the station and arrested several journalists.
