= Radio Tamazuj =

- Netherlands
- Broadcast area: South Sudan, Sudan

Programming
- Languages: English, Arabic, Juba Arabic

History
- Founded: 2011

Links
- Website: radiotamazuj.org

Radio Tamazuj is a Netherlands-based independent daily news service and current affairs broadcaster covering South Sudan, the southern states of Sudan, and the borderlands between the two countries. Since 2015 the radio has been in exile after its office in Juba was shut down by the South Sudanese national security service.

== Etymology ==
The word "Tamazuj" has been translated from the South Sudanese Arabic word for 'blend'.

== History ==
Radio Tamazuj was launched in 2011 and initially operated out of the South Sudanese capital of Juba. In 2015, the government shut down its office, interrogated its staff, and deported foreign editors. Since then, the radio's employees have been scattered across Africa.

== Community engagement ==
Radio Tamazuj has been sourced for being one of the news analyzers by the Relief Web to provide information for public consumption and thus has been feeding the public on information for both local and international linkages. Radio Tamazuj operates on shortwave during morning and evening time slots only, broadcasting in local dialect Arabic which makes it very easy for the local people to get what is being said which simplifies the message and informs the public. Radio Tamazuj also offers Voice of America--VOA broadcasting that encompasses the daily news from South Sudan in its bulletin.
