= MTN South Sudan =

Telecommunications company in South Sudan

Coordinates: 04°51′18″N 31°37′06″E

- Company type: Private, Subsidiary of MTN Group
- Industry: Telecommunications
- Founded: 9 July 2011; 14 years ago
- Headquarters: MTN Center; Hai Jerusalem; Juba, South Sudan
- Key people: Mopula Bodibe; CEO
- Services: Telecommunications; Information Technology; Carrier
- Number of employees: ~200 (2021)

MTN South Sudan is the largest telecommunications company in South Sudan, with an estimated 1,700,000 subscribers, accounting for 61.8 percent market share, as of 31 December 2020.

== Location ==
The headquarters of MTN South Sudan are located along B Lupai Lane, in the northeastern part of the city of Juba, the capital and largest city in that country. The geographical coordinates of the headquarters of MTN South Sudan are 4°51'18.0"N, 31°37'06.0"E (Latitude:4.855000; Longitude:31.618333).

== Overview ==
MTN South Sudan is a subsidiary of MTN Group, a multinational telecommunications group connecting approximately 232 million people in 22 countries across Africa and the Middle East. MTN South Sudan was established in 2011, at the time of South Sudan's independence.

== Governance ==
As of January 2020, the chief executive officer of the company is Gordian Kyomukama, previously the acting CEO of MTN Uganda and before that, the chief technology officer at MTN Uganda.

== See also ==
- List of mobile network operators in South Sudan
