= Association for Media Development in South Sudan =

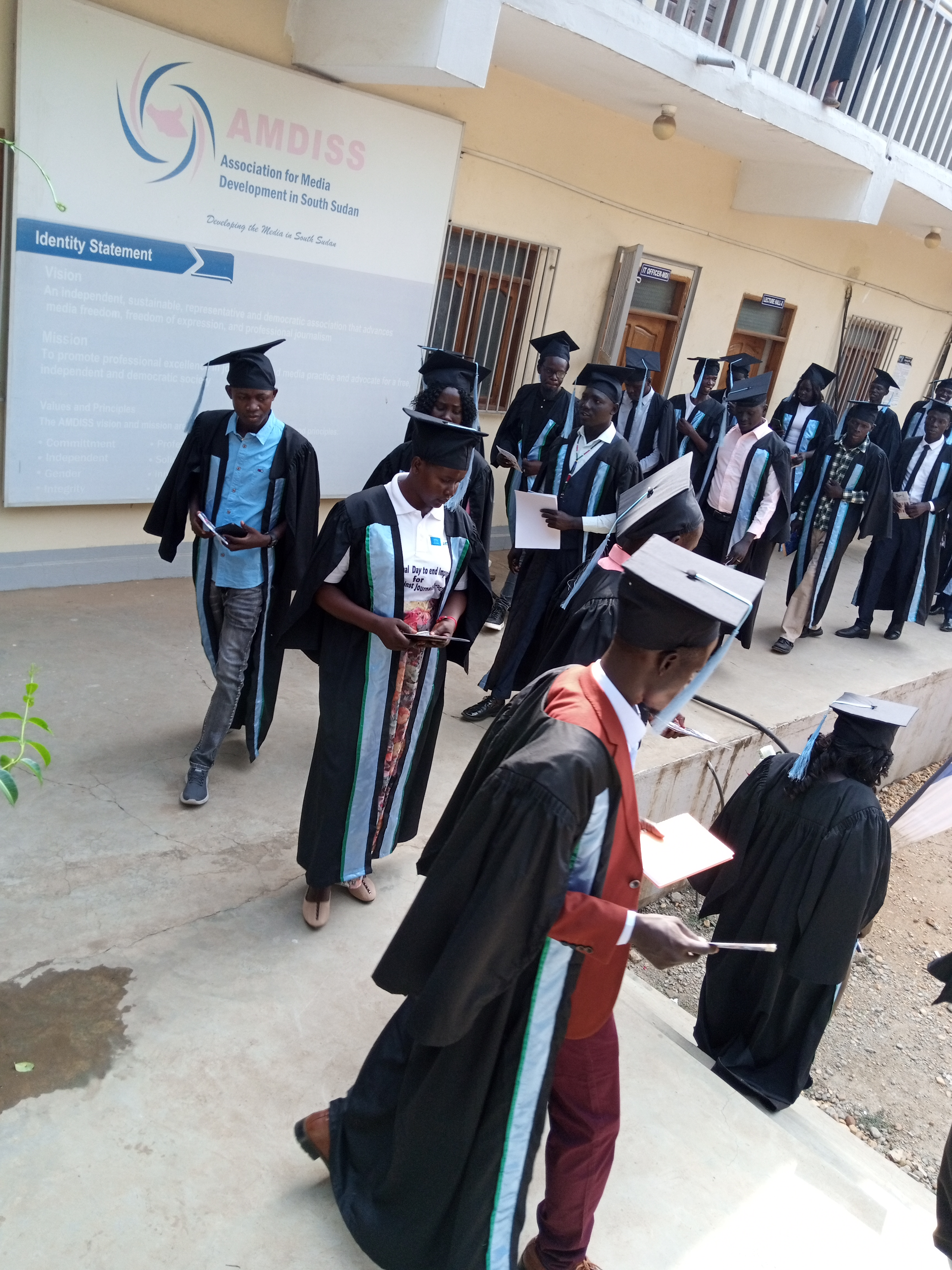
- MDI Students during their graduation
- Abbreviation: AMDISS
- Formation: 2003; 23 years ago
- Purpose: Development
- Headquarters: Juba, South Sudan
- Website: amdissmedia.net

The Association for Media Development in South Sudan (AMDISS) is a media association based in Juba, South Sudan. It was founded in 2003.

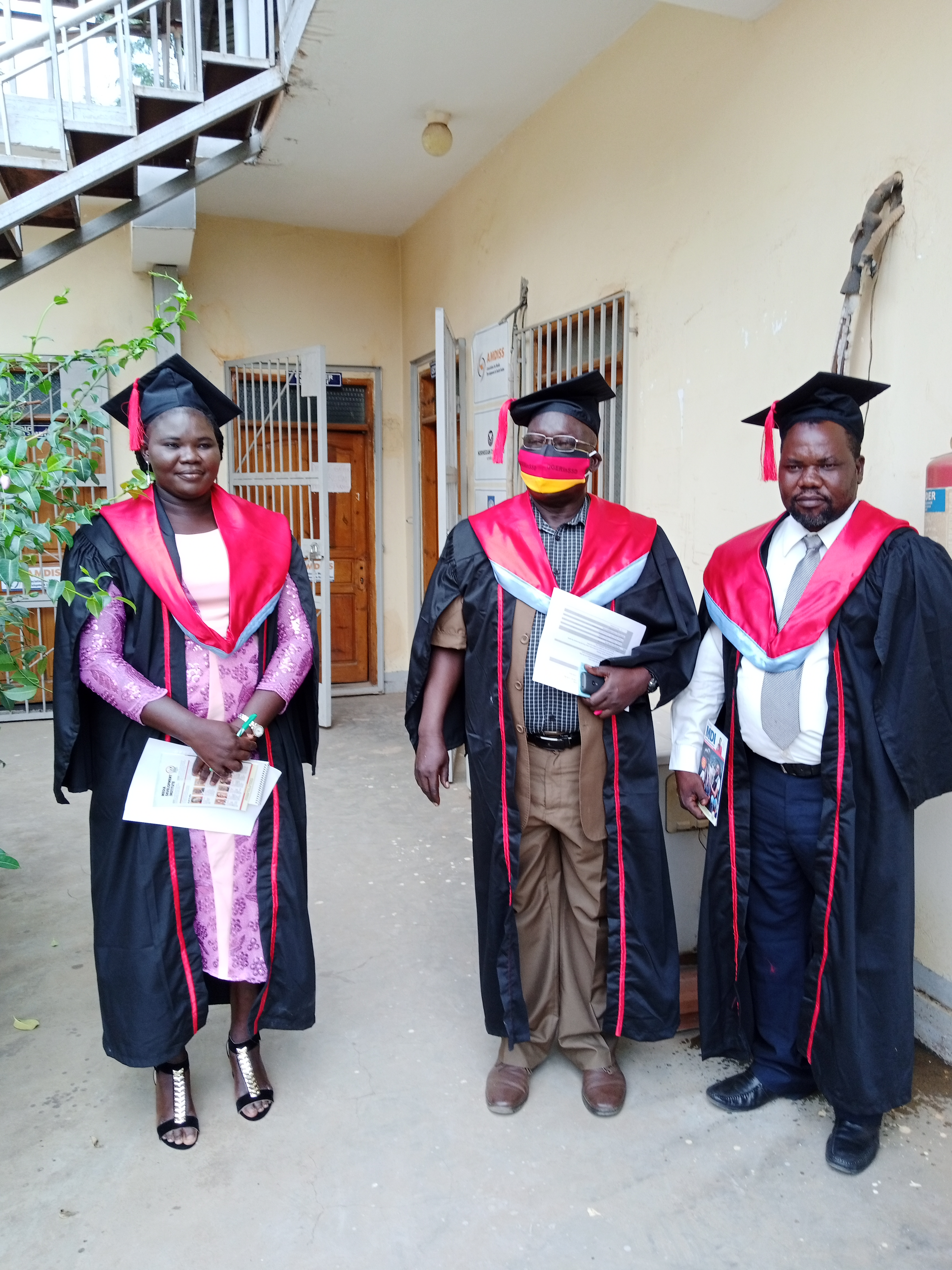
Media Development Administrators

The group works to help strengthen the media and provide a framework in South Sudan to ensure freedom of speech, the right to information and other human rights, and aims to protect freedom of expression, freedom of the press, and the allowance of self-regulation by the media. The AMDISS was also established to tackle the problem of the South Sudanese government understanding poorly the roles and duties of the media in the country.
