= Khartoum Monitor =

Khartoum Monitor is the only private English-language newspaper in Sudan. It was established by journalists from southern Sudan in 2000. The newspaper is known for its independent news and editorial policy and its refusal to accept the censorship policy of the Sudan government in particular articles on southern Sudan the ongoing war and the peace process led to its licence being cancelled and it being fined earlier Its journalists have been under threats from the Sudanese government and its former editor Nhial Bol had to flee the country after being jailed earlier. Later the ban on the newspaper was lifted.
