= Radio Mirraya =

Moro lokombo

Radio Mirraya 101 FM, is a radio station based in Juba operated and owned by United Nations mission in South Sudan.

== Background ==
It covers South Sudan and began broadcasting in South Sudan since June 30, 2006.

It provides news and information 24 hours, 7 days a week in English and Arabic. It is the fifth UN radio station operating on behalf of UN peace operation in 2006.
