= Eye Radio =

Radio station in Juba, South Sudan

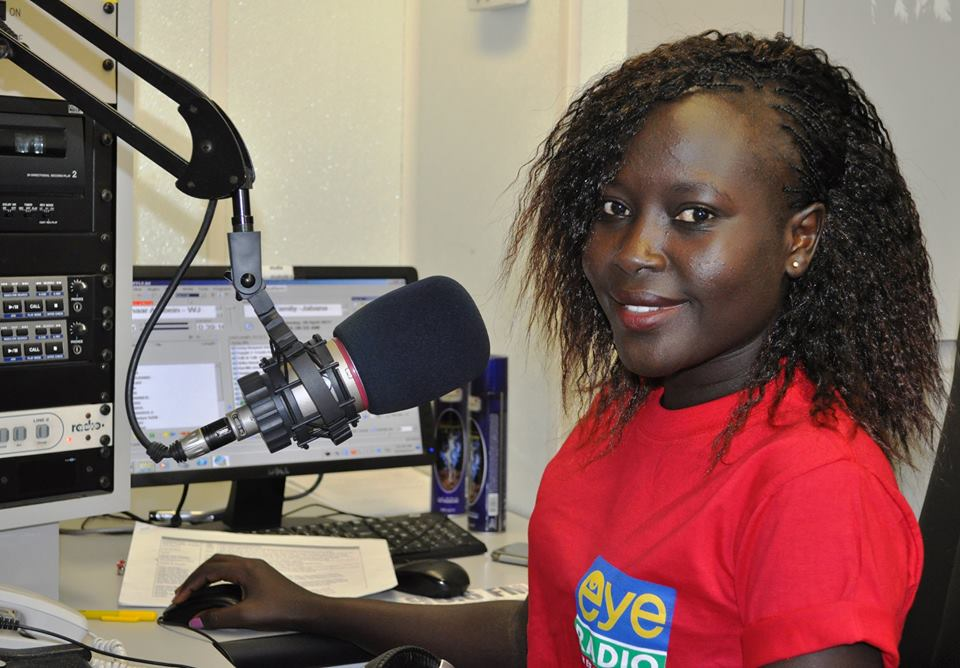
- Eye Radio-South Sudan station
- Juba; South Sudan
- Frequency: 98.6 FM

Programming
- Languages: English and Arabic
- Affiliations: Internews

History
- First air date: July 30, 2003
- Former names: Sudan Radio Service (2003–2012)

Links
- Website: eyeradio.org

Eye Radio, formerly Sudan Radio Service, is a 24-hour radio station based in Juba, South Sudan. The station is available online.

== History ==
The radio station was established as Sudan Radio Service (SRS) on 30 July 2003 in Nairobi as an USAID-funded Education Development Center (EDC) project and aired in shortwave broadcast. Initially, the radio broadcast news summaries and music for one hour and was available in English, Arabic, Dinka, Azande, Shilluk, Nuer, Bari, and Moru. In 2005, the radio aired the Comprehensive Peace Agreement.

In June 2010, SRS went on air from its station in Juba. The radio replaced its name from Sudan Radio Service to Eye Radio in August 2012. The South Sudan government suspended Eye Radio on 11 November 2016 after airing Riek Machar voice clip from Al Jazeera TV interview. On 19 November, the government lifted the ban and the Eye Radio resumed its broadcasting.

In 2019, Eye Radio reported on police extortion towards motorists over factory tints. Following this report, the government arrested 85 police officers and fired eight of them.

== Broadcast ==
Eye Radio has 11 repeaters in Yambio, Wau, Aweil, Kuajok, Renk, Malakal, Baliet, and Bor. Through solar panels, the radio is able to be on air for 24 hours. Eye Radio broadcasts news in English, Arabic, and other national languages, entertainment shows, live peace talks, and sports shows. USAID provided funds to support Eye Radio's operations.
